= Charles Louis, Prince of Anhalt-Bernburg-Schaumburg-Hoym =

Charles Louis
- Prince of Anhalt-Bernburg-Schaumburg-Hoym
- Born: 16 May 1723; Schaumburg
- Died: 20 August 1806 (aged 83); Schaumburg
- Spouse: Benjamine Gertrude Keiser; Amalie Eleonore of Solms-Braunfels
- Issue: Victoria Hedwig Karoline de Mahy, marquise de Favras; Victor II, Prince of Anhalt-Bernburg-Schaumburg-Hoym; William Louis; Alexius Klemens; Sophie Charlotte; Karoline Ulrike
- House: House of Ascania
- Father: Victor I, Prince of Anhalt-Bernburg-Schaumburg-Hoym
- Mother: Charlotte Louise of Isenburg-Büdingen-Birstein

Prince Charles Louis of Anhalt-Bernburg-Schaumburg-Hoym; Schaumburg, 16 May 1723 – Schaumburg, 20 August 1806), was a German prince of the House of Ascania from the Anhalt-Bernburg branch and ruler of the principality of Anhalt-Bernburg-Schaumburg-Hoym.

He was the third (but second surviving) son of Victor I Amadeus Adolph, Prince of Anhalt-Bernburg-Schaumburg-Hoym, by his first wife Charlotte Louise, daughter of Wilhelm Moritz, Count of Isenburg-Büdingen-Birstein and Countess Anna Amalie of Isenburg-Wächtersbach.

== Life ==
The death of his elder brother the Hereditary Prince Christian in 1758 made him the new heir of Anhalt-Bernburg-Schaumburg-Hoym. Fourteen years later, in 1772, Charles Louis succeeded his father in the government of the principality.

== Marriages and Issue ==
=== First marriage ===
When Charles Louis was a young officer in a regiment in the service of the Netherlands, he fell in love with Benjamine Gertrude Keiser [also called Kaiserinn or Keyser] (b. Stevensweert, 1 January 1729 - d. Belleville, near Paris, 6 January 1787), daughter of a Dutch captain. Without the consent of his father, Charles Louis married her in Stevensweert on 25 March 1748. They had one daughter:

1. Victoria Hedwig Karoline (b. Stevensweert, 9 January 1749 - d. Eger, 26 June 1841), married on 21 November 1776 to Thomas de Mahy, marquis de Favras, an officer in the guards of the Count de Provence, later King Louis XVIII.

The marriage was declared null and void by a court in The Hague on 26 July 1757, and Charles Louis and Benjamine's attempts to have their daughter recognized as a princess of Anhalt were rejected by the Reichshofrat on 11 May 1778; likewise. an attempt to obtain the title of countess of Anhalt was rejected on 14 September. Finally, Charles Louis obtained for his daughter the title of Baroness of Bärenthal (German: Freifrau von Bärenthal).

=== Second marriage ===
In Braunfels on 12 December 1765 Charles Louis married Princess Amalie Eleonore of Solms-Braunfels (b. Braunfels, 22 November 1734 - d. Schaumburg, 19 April 1811), daughter of Frederick William, Prince of Solms-Braunfels and his second wife Countess Sophia Magdalena Benigna of Solms-Utphe. They had five children:

1. Victor II Charles Frederick, Prince of Anhalt-Bernburg-Schaumburg-Hoym (b. Schaumburg, 2 November 1767 - d. Schaumburg, 22 April 1812) married Amalie Charlotte of Nassau-Weilburg (August 7, 1776 - February 19, 1841) on October 29, 1793.
2. William Louis (b. Schaumburg, 19 April 1771 - killed in action, Stockach, 25 March 1799).
3. Alexius Klemens (b. Schaumburg, 19 August 1772 - d. Schaumburg, 12 July 1776).
4. Sophie Charlotte (b. Schaumburg, 29 September 1773 - d. Schaumburg, 25 February 1774).
5. Karoline Ulrike (b. Schaumburg, 22 September 1775 - d. Schaumburg, 4 March 1782).

== Ancestry ==
Ancestors of Charles Louis, Prince of Anhalt-Bernburg-Schaumburg-Hoym

8. Victor Amadeus, Prince of Anhalt-Bernburg
4. Lebrecht, Prince of Anhalt-Zeitz-Hoym
9. Elizabeth of Palatinate-Zweibrücken
2. Victor I, Prince of Anhalt-Bernburg-Schaumburg-Hoym
10. Adolph, Prince of Nassau-Schaumburg
5. Charlotte of Nassau-Schaumburg
11. Elisabeth Charlotte, Countess of Holzappel
1. Charles Louis, Prince of Anhalt-Bernburg-Schaumburg-Hoym
12. John Louis of Isenburg-Offenbach
6. Wilhelm Maurice, Count of Isenburg-Büdingen-Birstein
13. Louise of Nassau-Dillenburg
3. Charlotte Louise of Isenburg-Büdingen-Birstein
14. Johann Ernst, Count of Ysenburg and Büdingen
7. Anna Amalie of Ysenburg and Büdingen
15. Marie Charlotte of Erbach

== Bibliography ==
- Christian von Stramburg, Anton Joseph Weidenbach: Denkwürdiger und nützlicher Rheinischer Antiquarius ..., Teil 2, Band 3, p. 308 ff.
- Ferdinand Siebigk: Das Herzogthum Anhalt, p. 243, Dessau, 1867
- Philipp Ernst Bertram, Johann C. Krause: Geschichte des Hauses und Fürstenthums Anhalt, Band 2, p. 644, Curt, 1782

Charles Louis, Prince of Anhalt-Bernburg-Schaumburg-Hoym House of Ascania Born: 16 May 1723 Died: 20 August 1806
Preceded by Victor I	Prince of Anhalt-Bernburg-Schaumburg-Hoym; 1772–1806	Succeeded by Victor II
