= Frederick, Prince of Anhalt-Bernburg-Schaumburg-Hoym =

Frederick I

Prince of Anhalt-Bernburg-Schaumburg-Hoym
- Reign: 22 April 1812 – 24 December 1812
- Born: 29 November 1741; Schaumburg
- Died: 24 December 1812 (aged 71); Homburg vor der Höhe
- House: House of Ascania
- Father: Victor I, Prince of Anhalt-Bernburg-Schaumburg-Hoym
- Mother: Countess Hedwig Sophie Henckel von Donnersmarck

Frederick of Anhalt-Bernburg-Schaumburg-Hoym (Schaumburg, 29 November 1741 – Homburg vor der Höhe, 24 December 1812), was a German prince of the House of Ascania from the Anhalt-Bernburg branch and the last ruler of the principality of Anhalt-Bernburg-Schaumburg-Hoym.

He was the fifth (but fourth surviving) son of Victor I, Prince of Anhalt-Bernburg-Schaumburg-Hoym, but the first-born by his second wife, Countess Hedwig Sophie Henckel von Donnersmarck.

== Life ==
After the death of his father in 1772, Frederick and his brothers were excluded from the government of Anhalt-Bernburg-Schaumburg-Hoym by their older brother, Prince Karl Louis, until his death in 1806.

At the time of Karl Louis's death, Frederick was his only surviving brother and reclaimed the government from his nephew Prince Victor II. Frederick claimed that the primogeniture was never formally installed in Anhalt-Bernburg-Schaumburg-Hoym and, according to the traditional laws of the House of Ascania, he had the right to share the government with Victor II. The dispute ended with the death of Victor II without male heirs on 22 April 1812, who left Frederick as the only living agnate of the branch and, in consequence, heir to the principality.

=== Reign ===
Frederick's rule lasted only eight months until his death. Because he never married or had children, the line of Anhalt-Bernburg-Schaumburg-Hoym became extinct with him.

=== Succession ===
His kinsman Duke Alexius of Anhalt-Bernburg inherited Hoym and the other lands obtained from the main branch of Anhalt-Bernburg in 1718 when the line was created; but the Counties of Holzappel and Schaumburg were inherited by his eldest grandniece, Hermine, by marriage Archduchess of Austria, as the senior heir of Elisabeth Charlotte Melander, Countess of Holzappel, who by treaty in 1690 gave her counties as a dowry to her youngest daughter, Princess Charlotte of Nassau-Dillenburg, then betrothed to Prince Lebrecht of Anhalt-Zeitz-Hoym. Hermine's son Archduke Stephen of Austria, Palatine of Hungary eventually inherited the Counties.

== Bibliography ==
- Ferdinand Siebigk: Das Herzogthum Anhalt, p. 243, Desbarats, 1867

Preceded by Victor II	Prince of Anhalt-Bernburg-Schaumburg-Hoym; 1812	Succeeded by Hermine in Holzappel and Schaumburg; Alexius Frederick Christian in Hoym
