= Princess Victoria Charlotte of Anhalt-Zeitz-Hoym =

Victoria Charlotte of Anhalt-Zeitz-Hoym
- Margravine of Brandenburg-Bayreuth
- Born: 25 December 1715; Schaumburg
- Died: 4 February 1772 (aged 56); Schaumburg
- Burial: Melander Crypt in Holzappel
- Spouse: Frederick Christian, Margrave of Brandenburg-Bayreuth
- Issue Detail: Christiane Sophie Charlotte of Brandenburg-Bayreuth
- House: House of Ascania
- Father: Victor I, Prince of Anhalt-Bernburg-Schaumburg-Hoym
- Mother: Charlotte Louise of Isenburg-Büdingen-Birstein

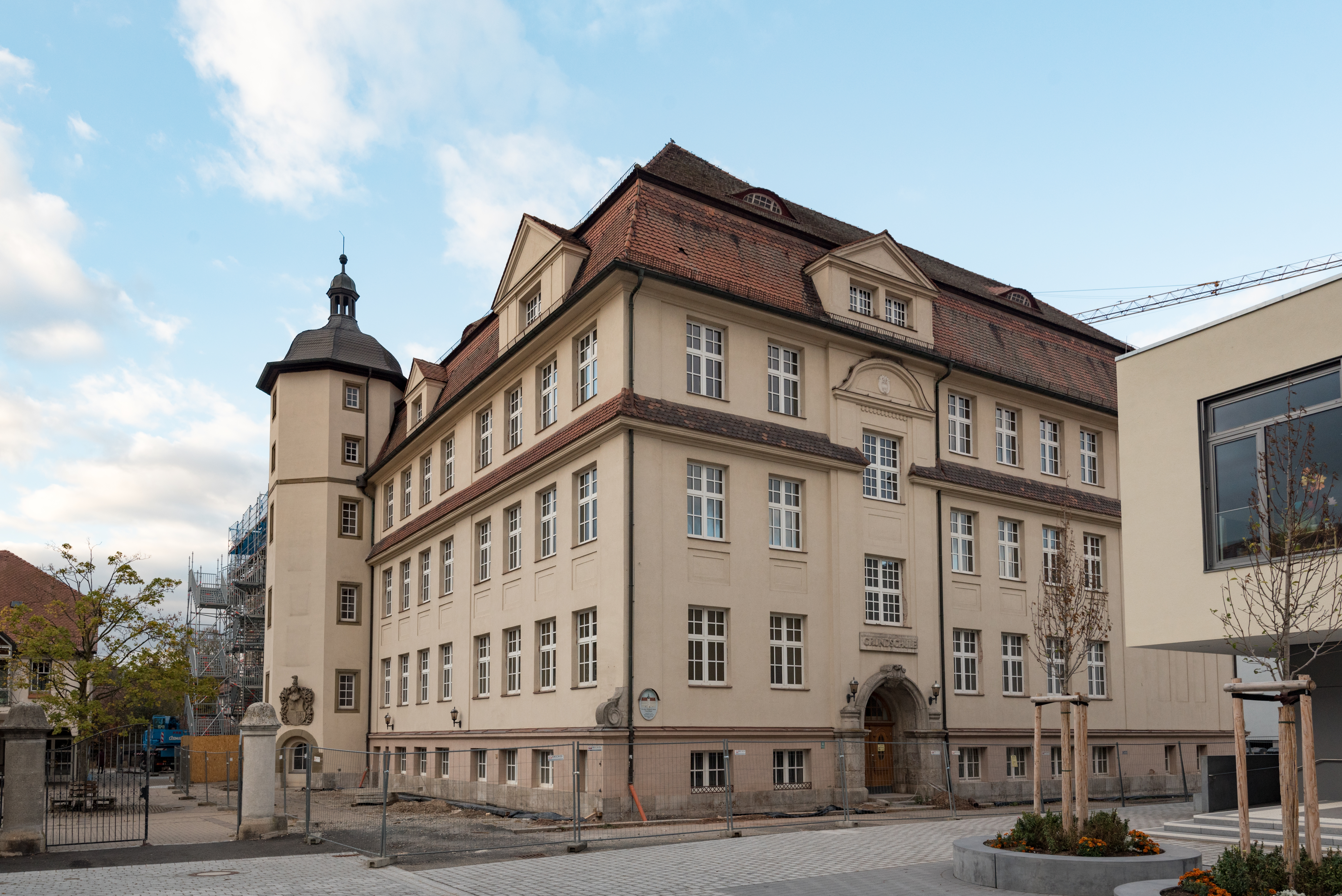
Victoria Charlotte's residence: Neuess schloss Neustadt an der Aisch

Victoria Charlotte of Anhalt-Bernburg-Schaumburg-Hoym (25 September 1715 – 4 February 1772) was a princess of Anhalt-Bernburg-Schaumburg-Hoym by birth and Margravine of Brandenburg-Bayreuth by marriage.

== Early life ==
Victoria Charlotte was a daughter of Prince Victor I of Anhalt-Bernburg-Schaumburg-Hoym from his first marriage to Countess Charlotte Louise of Isenburg-Büdingen-Birstein, eldest daughter of Count William Maurice of Isenburg-Büdingen-Birstein and Countess Anna Amalia of Isenburg-Büdingen (1653-1700).

== Biography ==
On 26 April 1732 she married the later Margrave Frederick Christian of Brandenburg-Bayreuth (1708–1769) in Schaumburg. After the wedding the couple moved into the New Castle in Neustadt an der Aisch at the request Frederick Christian's brother George Frederick Charles.

The marriage ended in divorce in 1764, a year after Frederick Christian succeeded his brother as Margrave of Brandenburg-Bayreuth. The couple had already lived separately since 1739 because Frederick Christian was very jealous. Victoria Charlotte spent the last years of her life in humble conditions in Halle.

== Issue ==
From her marriage, Victoria Charlotte had two daughters:

- Christiane Sophie Charlotte (1733–1757)

married in 1757 Duke Ernest Frederick III Carl of Saxe-Hildburghausen (1727–1780)

- Sophie Magdalene (12 January 1737 – 23 July 1737), died as a baby

== Death ==
Princess Victoria Charlotte died 4 February 1772 in schloss Schaumburg, aged 56. Her body was buried in the Melander Crypt in Holzappel, Rhineland-Palatinate, Germany.

== Footnotes ==
Princess Victoria Charlotte of Anhalt-Zeitz-Hoym House of Ascania Born: 25 September 1715 Died: 4 February 1792
German nobility
Preceded by Sophie Caroline Marie of Brunswick-Wolfenbüttel	Margravine consort of Brandenburg-Bayreuth; 26 February 1763 – 1764	Succeeded by Princess Frederica Caroline of Saxe-Coburg-Saalfeld
