= Elisabeth Charlotte, Countess of Holzappel =

Elisabeth Charlotte Countess of Holzappel
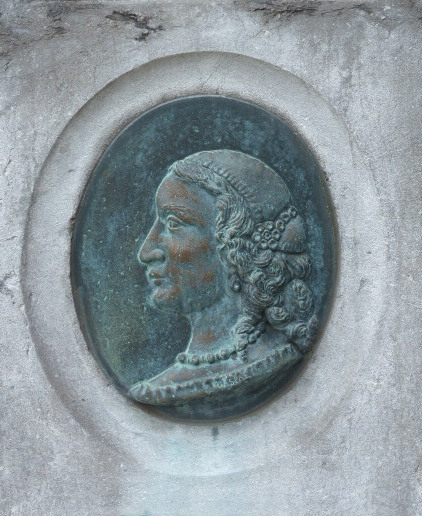
- Elisabeth Charlotte von Schaumburg-Nassau
- Born: Elisabeth Charlotte Melander; 29 February 1640
- Died: 17 March 1707 (aged 67)
- Other names: Elisabeth Charlotte von Schaumburg-Nassau
- Known for: Countess of Holzappel (1648–1707) and Schaumburg (1656–1707)
- Notable work: founded the Waldensian settlement Charlottenberg, Germany (1699)
- Spouse: Count Adolph of Nassau-Dillenburg (m. 1658)
- Children: 5 sons, 2 daughters
- Parents: Peter Melander, Count of Holzappel (father); Agnes von Efferen-Hall (mother)

Elisabeth Charlotte Melander (29 February 1640 – 17 March 1707), was Countess of Holzappel from 1648 to 1707 and Schaumburg from 1656 to 1707.

== Early life and background ==
Elisabeth Charlotte was the only child of Peter Melander, Count of Holzappel and his wife, Baroness Agnes von Efferen-Hall (d. 1656). Peter Melander was an imperial field marshal who had become rich due to his position in the Thirty Years' War and had been appointed Count of Holzappel in 1641. In 1643, he purchased the Lordship of Esterau along with the bailiwick of Isselbach from John Louis of Nassau-Hadamar, who was in considerable financial difficulty. Emperor Ferdinand III subsequently raised the small Lordship to the Imperial County of Holzappel as a reward for the services Melander had performed while in the imperial army.

== Countess of Holzappel ==
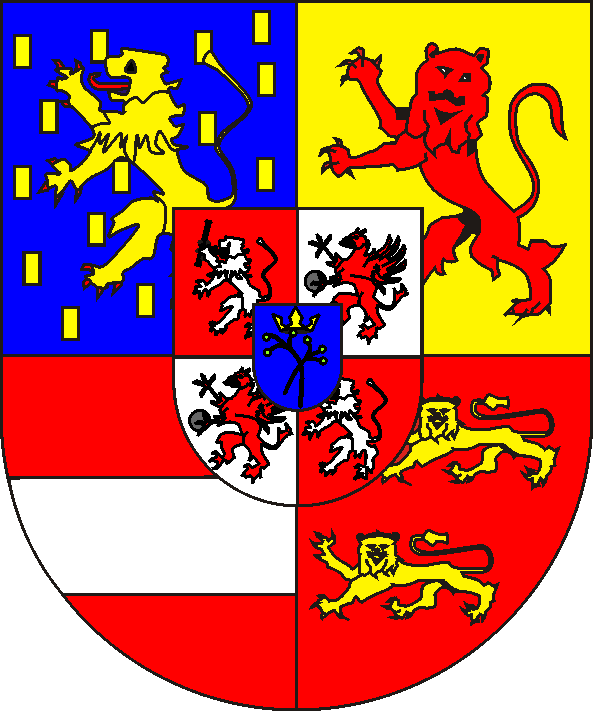
Coat of arms of Nassau-Schaumburg

Melander died on 17 May 1648 in Augsburg, as a result of the wounds he had received in Battle of Zusmarshausen. The County of Holzappel was inherited by Elisabeth Charlotte as his only child, in spite of a suit by Melander's nephews.

Peter Melander left a fortune that allowed his widow Agnes to purchase the Castle and Lordship of Schaumburg near Balduinstein in 1656. When Agnes died later the same year, the Lordship of Schaumburg was also inherited by Elisabeth Charlotte and merged with Holzappel, thus forming the County of Holzappel-Schaumburg.

In 1658, Elisabeth Charlotte married Count Adolph of Nassau-Dillenburg. After the marriage he took the title Count of Nassau-Schaumburg and founded the cadet line of the House of Nassau with this name.

In 1685, Elisabeth Charlotte changed the name of the county seat from Esten into Holzappel. She allowed refugee Huguenots and Waldensians to settle in the county, and in 1699 founded the Waldensian settlement Charlottenberg near Holzappel which was named after her.

== Succession ==
As all her sons died in her lifetime, by a contract of 1 September 1690 concluded with Victor Amadeus, Prince of Anhalt-Bernburg, Elisabeth Charlotte left Holzappel to the youngest of her three daughters, Charlotte of Nassau-Schaumburg, who married Victor Amadeus' younger son Lebrecht of Anhalt-Dernburg in 1692. Thus, after the death of Elisabeth Charlotte in 1707, the county passed to a cadet line of the princely house of Anhalt-Bernburg, the Princes of Anhalt-Bernburg-Schaumburg-Hoym.

== Issue ==
- Agnes (b. and d. 13 June 1659)
- Wilhelm Ludwig (b. 8 February 1661 – d. 5 April 1661)
- Ernestine Charlotte (b. 20 May 1662 – d. 21 February 1732), married firstly on 6 February 1678 to William Maurice, Prince of Nassau-Siegen (d. 1691) and secondly to Friedrich Philipp von Geuder genannt von Rabensteiner (d. 1727)
- Johanna Elisabeth (5 September 1663 – 9 February 1700), married on 16 June 1692 to Frederick Adolphus, Count of Lippe-Detmold (d. 1718)
- Louise Henriette (b. 17 February 1665 – d. 17 April 1665)
- Karl Heinrich (b. and d. 6 September 1670)
- Charlotte (25 September 1673 – 31 January 1700), married on 12 April 1692 to Lebrecht, Prince of Anhalt-Zeitz-Hoym (d. 1727)

Preceded by Peter Melander	Countess of Holzappel; 1648–1707	Succeeded by Victor I, Prince of Anhalt-Bernburg-Schaumburg-Hoym
