= Charlotte of Nassau-Schaumburg =

Wife of Lebrecht, Prince of Anhalt-Zeitz-Hoym

- Princess consort of Anhalt-Bernburg-Hoym
- Born: 25 September 1672; Holy Roman Empire
- Died: 31 January 1700 (aged 27)
- Burial: Church of Saint Aegidien, Bernburg, Germany
- Spouse: Lebrecht, Prince of Anhalt-Zeitz-Hoym
- Issue: Victor I Frederick William; Elisabeth Charlotte; Christian; Victoria Hedwig
- House: Nassau
- Father: Adolph, Prince of Nassau-Schaumburg
- Mother: Elisabeth Charlotte, Countess of Holzappel

Charlotte of Nassau-Dillenburg-Schaumburg of Anhalt-Bernburg-Hoym (25 September 1672–31 January 1700) was the wife of Lebrecht, Prince of Anhalt-Zeitz-Hoym, a German prince of the House of Ascania.

== Life ==
Charlotte of Nassau-Dillenburg-Schaumburg was born on 25 September 1672 in the Holy Roman Empire. She was the beneficiary of the Holzappel and Lordship of Schaumburg and the youngest of the three surviving daughters of Adolph, Prince of Nassau-Schaumburg. Charlotte was declared the sole heiress of the Holzappel (which included the towns of Holzappel and Charlottenberg) and the Lordship of Schaumburg.

By a contract made on 1 September 1690 between Victor Amadeus, Prince of Anhalt-Bernburg, and Elisabeth Charlotte Melander, Countess of the Holzappel, Charlotte was betrothed to Lebrecht, Prince of Anhalt-Zeitz-Hoym. The marriage was performed in Schaumburg on 12 April 1692. They had five children:

- Victor I Amadeus Adolph, Prince of Anhalt-Bernburg-Schaumburg-Hoym (7 September 1693, Schaumburg – 15 April 1772, Schaumburg).
- Frederick William (12 April 1695, Schaumburg – died in action at 24 July 1712, Denain).
- Elisabeth Charlotte (4 December 1696, Bernburg – 14 June 1754, Schaumburg).
- Christian (27 November 1698, Bernburg – died in action 29 April 1720, Palermo).
- Victoria Hedwig (30 January 1700, Bernburg – 10 February 1701, Schaumburg).

She died on 31 January 1700, aged 27, and is interred in the church of Saint Aegidien in Bernburg, Germany.
