= County of Holzappel =

State of the Holy Roman Empire (1643–1806)

County of Holzappel Grafschaft Holzappel (de)
- 1643–1806
- Coat of arms
- Status: County
- Capital: Holzappel
- History
  - Peter Melander, Count of Holzappel: 1643
  - Disestablished: 1806

The County of Holzappel (German: Grafschaft Holzappel) was an immediate state of the Holy Roman Empire, located in the present German state of Rhineland-Palatinate.

It was centered on the town of Holzappel. It was founded in 1643 by Peter Melander, an imperial field marshal during the Thirty Years' War. In 1806, the county lost its imperial immediacy and was mediatised to the Duchy of Nassau. It was dissolved in 1918.

== History ==
The County of Holzappel emerged from the small lordship of Esterau consisting of 12 villages centered on the town of Esten.

=== Peter Melander ===
In 1643, the Lordship of Esterau along with the bailiwick of Isselbach was purchased by Peter Melander from John Louis of Nassau-Hadamar, who was in considerable financial difficulty. Peter Meleander was an imperial field marshal who had become rich due to his position in the Thirty Years' War and had been appointed Count of Holzappel in 1641. Emperor Ferdinand III subsequently raised the small Lordship to the Imperial County of Holzappel. The Count of Holzappel became a member of the Wetterau Association of Imperial Counts in the Imperial Diet of the Holy Roman Empire.

In the 17th century, the county consisted of:

- Esterau: Esten (later Holzappel), Laurenburg with Burg Laurenburg, Langschied, Geilnau, Kalkofen, Dörnberg, Scheid, Horhausen, Bergen, Bruchhausen, Billenstein, Zum Hahne, Kirchhain and Gerschhausen.
- Bailiwick Isselbach: Isselbach, Ruppenroth, Eppenroth and Obernhof.

Melander died on 17 May 1648 in Augsburg, as a result of the wounds he had received in Battle of Zusmarshausen. He was buried in the princely crypt (the Melandergruft) in the Lutheran St. John church in Esten. The County of Holzappel was inherited by his only child, Elisabeth Charlotte in spite of a suit by Melander's nephews.

=== Elisabeth Charlotte of Nassau-Schaumburg ===
Peter Melander left a fortune that allowed his widow Agnes to purchase the Castle and Lordship of Schaumburg near Balduinstein in 1656. Eventually, it was also inherited by her daughter, Elisabeth Charlotte, and merged with Holzappel, thus forming the County of Holzappel-Schaumburg.

Elisabeth Charlotte married Prince Adolph of Nassau-Dillenburg in 1658 and became Princess Elisabeth Charlotte of Nassau-Schaumburg.

In 1685, Elisabeth Charlotte changed the name of the county seat from Esten into Holzappel. She allowed refugee Huguenots and Waldensians to settle in the county, and in 1699 founded the Waldensian settlement Charlottenberg near Holzappel which was named after her.

=== House of Anhalt-Bernburg-Schaumburg-Hoym ===
By a contract of 1 September 1690 with Victor Amadeus, Prince of Anhalt-Bernburg, Elisabeth Charlotte left Holzappel to the youngest of her three daughters, Charlotte of Nassau-Schaumburg, who married Victor Amadeus' younger son Lebrecht of Anhalt-Dernburg in 1692. Thus, the county was inherited by a cadet line of the princely house of Anhalt-Bernburg, the Princes of Anhalt-Bernburg-Schaumburg-Hoym.

In 1806, the county lost its imperial immediacy and was mediatised to the Duchy of Nassau.

=== House of Habsburg-Lorraine ===
In 1812, with the death of Victor II, Prince of Anhalt-Bernburg-Schaumburg-Hoym, the line of Anhalt-Bernburg-Schaumburg-Hoym became extinct in the male line. The County of Holzappel was inherited by his eldest daughter, Hermine who was married to Archduke Joseph of Austria and subsequently to her son Archduke Stephen of Austria.

=== House of Oldenburg ===
In 1867, after the childless death of Archduke Stephen, it passed to his first cousin once removed, Duke George Louis of Oldenburg.

=== House of Waldeck ===
However, George Victor, Prince of Waldeck and Pyrmont challenged his inheritance, and in 1887, the courts ruled in his favour.

The county was dissolved in 1918.

== Counts of Holzappel ==
- 1643 – 1648 Peter Melander, Count of Holzappel
- 1648 – 1707 Elisabeth Charlotte, Countess of Holzappel
- 1707 – 1772 Victor I, Prince of Anhalt-Bernburg-Schaumburg-Hoym
- 1772 – 1806 Charles Louis, Prince of Anhalt-Bernburg-Schaumburg-Hoym
- 1806 – 1812 Victor II, Prince of Anhalt-Bernburg-Schaumburg-Hoym
- 1812 – 1817 Princess Hermine of Anhalt-Bernburg-Schaumburg-Hoym
- 1817 – 1867 Archduke Stephen of Austria
- 1867 – 1887 Duke George Louis of Oldenburg
- 1887 – 1893 George Victor, Prince of Waldeck and Pyrmont
- 1893 – 1918 Friedrich, Prince of Waldeck and Pyrmont
