= Ernestine Charlotte of Nassau-Schaumburg =

German princess (1662–1732)

- Princess of Nassau-Siegen
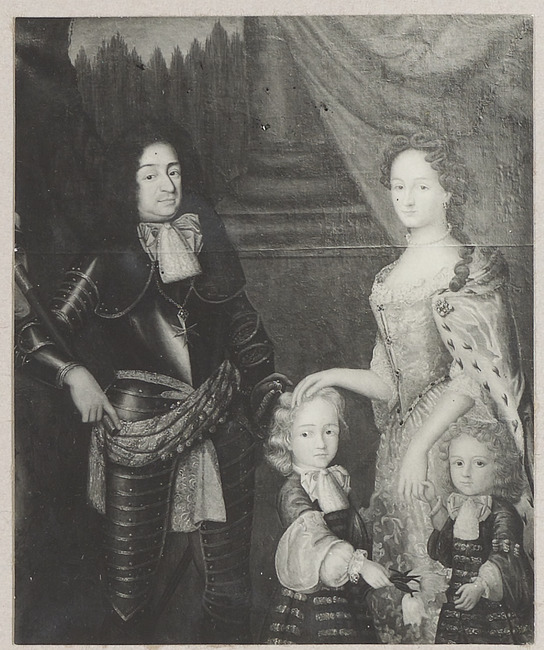
- Ernestine Charlotte with her family, c. 1690
- Born: 20 May 1662; Schaumburg Castle
- Died: 21 February 1732; Nassauischer Hof, Siegen
- Buried: 15 March 1732; Fürstengruft, Siegen
- Spouses: William Maurice of Nassau-Siegen; Friedrich Philipp Reichsfreiherr von Geuder genannt Rabensteiner
- Issue Detail: Frederick William Adolf
- Father: Adolf of Nassau-Schaumburg
- Mother: Elisabeth Charlotte Melander, Countess of Holzappel

Ernestine Charlotte of Nassau-Schaumburg (20 May 1662 – 21 February 1732) was a princess from the House of Nassau-Schaumburg, a cadet branch of the Ottonian Line of the House of Nassau and through marriage Princess of Nassau-Siegen. She served as regent of the Principality of Nassau-Siegen (part of the County of Nassau) for her son Frederick William Adolf from 1691 to 1701.

== Biography ==
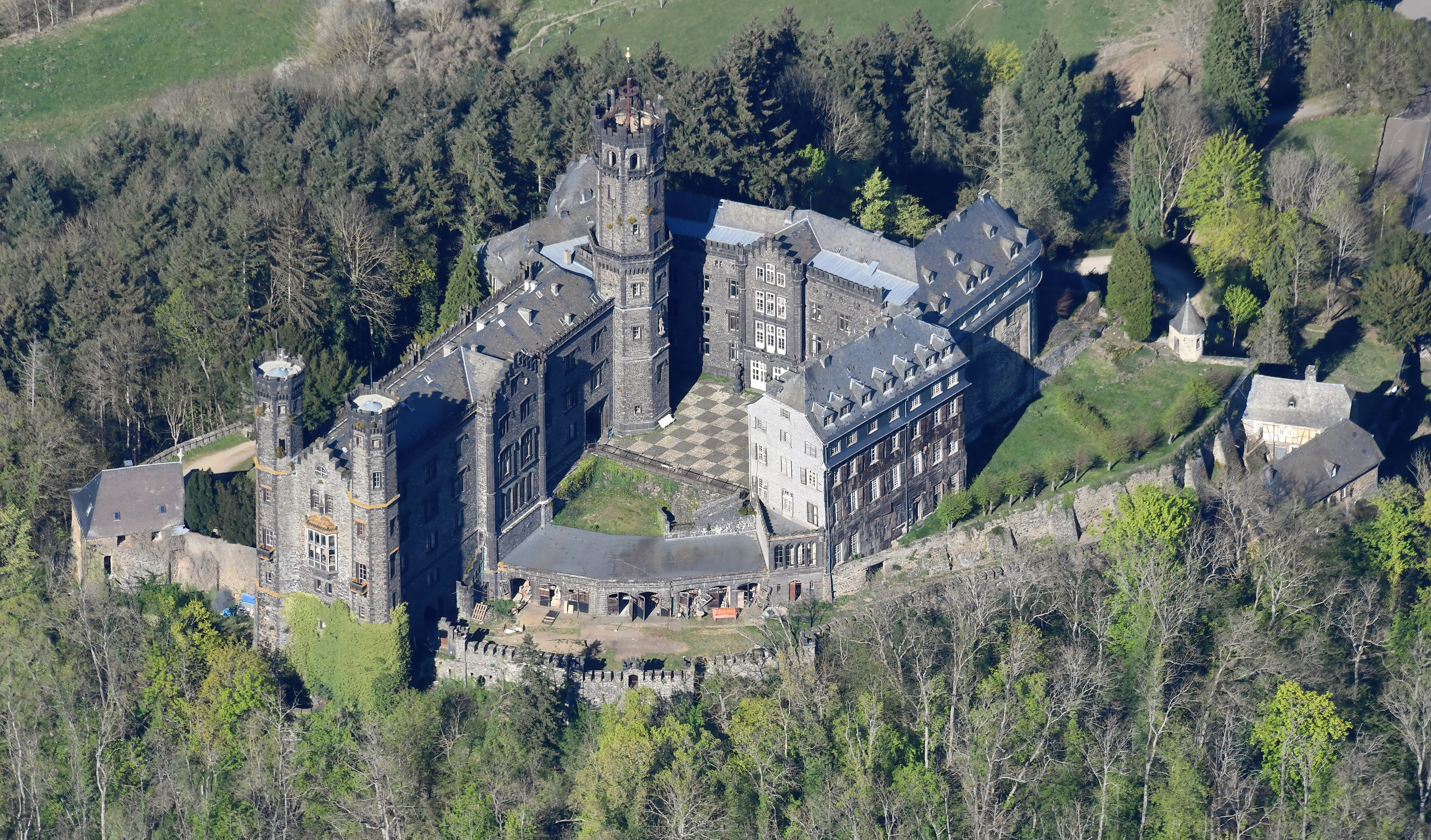
Aerial image of Schaumburg Castle. Photo: Carsten Steger, 2022.

Ernestine Charlotte was born at Schaumburg Castle on 20 May 1662 (Note: "See State Archives Wiesbaden (170^{III}) several birth notifications dated Schaumburg 21/31 May 1662: «gestern den 20/30ten diesses, des Abends zwischen 8 und 9 Uhren».") as the second daughter of Adolph, Prince of Nassau-Schaumburg and his wife Elisabeth Charlotte Melander, Countess of Holzappel.

Ernestine Charlotte married at Schaumburg Castle on 6 February 1678 (Note: "In the parish records of Terborg it is stated that the marriage took place in Schaumburg («in arce Schaumburgenei»). See the marriage announcement (State Archives Marburg 4f, Nassau-Siegen, 203) at Schaumburg 10‑2 old style: «den 6 dieses … das fürstl. Beylager gehalten». Dek (1962) and Europäische Stammtafeln mention 6‑1‑1678; that is the engagement date (see the notification in State Archives Marburg 4f, Nassau-Siegen 203). Dek (1970) no longer gives a place and date of marriage, but only mentions that the announcement was made in Lichtenvoorde on 3‑2‑1678.") to William Maurice of Nassau-Siegen, the eldest son of Count Henry of Nassau-Siegen and Countess Mary Magdalene of Limburg-Stirum. Ernestine Charlotte's great-grandfather, George, Count of Nassau-Dillenburg, was a younger brother of William Maurice's grandfather John VII of Nassau-Siegen.

William Maurice succeeded his maternal grandfather in September 1661 as count of Bronkhorst, lord of Wisch, Borculo, Lichtenvoorde and Wildenborch, and hereditary knight banneret of the Duchy of Guelders and the County of Zutphen. On 20 December 1679 he succeeded his uncle and adoptive father John Maurice, Prince of Nassau-Siegen as Prince of Nassau-Siegen. William Maurice died in 1691 and was buried in the Fürstengruft in Siegen on 12 March. He was succeeded by his son Frederick William Adolf who was under the custody and regency of his mother Ernestine Charlotte until 1701.

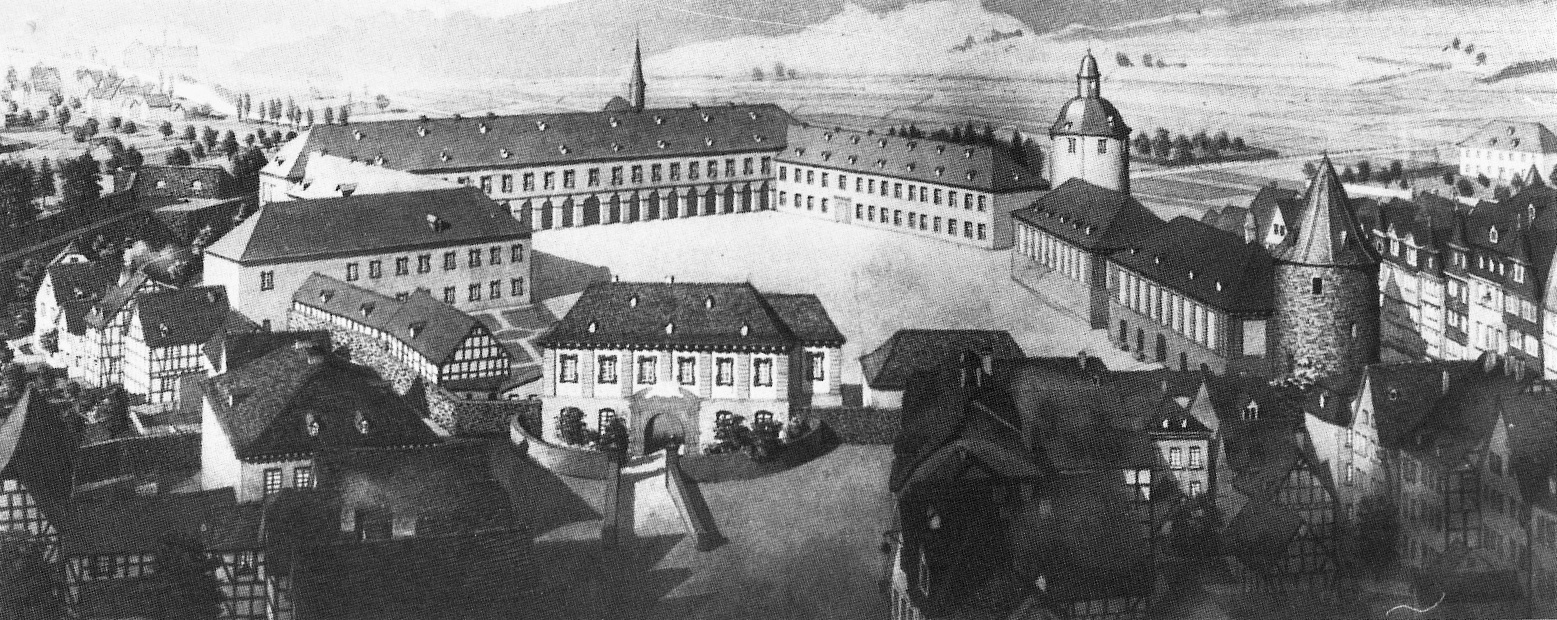
The new Nassauischer Hof, later called Untere Schloss, seen from the west, ca. 1720. Attempt at reconstruction, ink drawing, Wilhelm Scheiner, 1922.

During her regency, in 1695, a major city fire destroyed a large part of the city of Siegen, including the Nassauischer Hof, the princely Residenz, and the nearby church. Both buildings were built in 1488 by Count John V of Nassau-Siegen as a Franciscan monastery. The Nassauischer Hof housed, among others, the collection of paintings of the Fürsten of Nassau-Siegen. Numerous valuable paintings by famous artists, including Rembrandt, Peter Paul Rubens and Anthony van Dyck, fell victim to the flames. The nearby Fürstengruft was spared in the fire. The burnt down residence building was not rebuilt. Under the old name, a new three-winged palace was built on the site, and the Fürstengruft was completely incorporated into the corps de logis. The construction of the new palace, which has been called Untere Schloss since the mid 18th century, took place between 1695 and 1720.

Ernestine Charlotte remarried (Note: Vorsterman van Oyen (1882), p. 135 does not mention the second marriage.) secretly in 1696 to Friedrich Philipp Reichsfreiherr von Geuder genannt Rabensteiner, lord of Heroldsberg and Stein, since 1691 Geheimrat and Hofmeister of the Principality of Nassau-Siegen, later also imperial Geheimrat.

Ernestine Charlotte died at the Nassauischer Hof in Siegen on 21 February 1732 (Note: "See State Archives Wiesbaden (170^{III}) notification of death dated Siegen 23‑2‑1732: «vorgestern Mittag zwischen 11 und 12 Uhren in dem 70ten Jahres ihres Alters». See also the parish records of Siegen. Europäische Stammtafeln I, 117 and 118 states the fantasised dates 21‑2‑1714 and 19‑10‑1714 respectively.") and was buried on 15 March in the Fürstengruft there.

== Issue ==
From the marriage of Ernestine Charlotte and William Maurice the following children were born:

1. Frederick William Adolf (Note: "In almost all official documents he is mentioned with these three given names, but sometimes only Frederick William (see for instance Menk (1971), p. 89). Dek (1970) names him Frederik Willem I Adolf; Europäische Stammtafeln on the other hand, mentions him as Adolf in its table Nassau-Siegen (band I, 117), while in other places he mentions him under the double given name Friedrich Wilhelm, which causes some confusion among readers.") (20 February 1680 – 13 February 1722), succeeded his father in 1691. Married firstly at Homburg Castle on 7 January 1702 (Note: "Although the marriage announcement (State Archives Marburg 4f, Nassau-Siegen, Nr. 241), dated Siegen 12‑1‑1702 says that it was «den 6 hujus mittelst christgewöhnlicher Einsegnung und Beilager vollzogen» (without mentioning the place), we have taken the 7th, just like Knetsch (1931), according to the register of the reformed parish of Homburg: «Ao 1702 den 7 Januarii ist der Durchlachtigste Fürst Friedrich Wilhelm Adolph zu Nassau-Siegen mit der Durchl. Princesse Elisabetha Juliana Francisca Landgräfin zu Hessen Homburg alhier zu Homburg auf dem festen Schloss ehelich vermählet worden». Likewise, the personal details in the printed funeral sermon: «und darauff noch den 7 Januarii zu Homburg in der Hochfürstl. Schloss Kirche nach erfolgter Priestlichen Copulation Dero Hochfürstl. … Beylager gehalten» and the personalia preserved in the Royal House Archive of the Netherlands (IV/1561): «den 7 Januar 1702 zu Homburg a.d.H. vermittelst Priestlicher Copulation». We found 6‑1 in Dek (1962), Europäische Stammtafeln I, 117, Vorsterman van Oyen (1882), and 7‑1 in Europäische Stammtafeln I, 106 and Knetsch (1931).") to Elisabeth Juliana Francisca of Hesse-Homburg, and secondly at the Old Castle in Bayreuth on 13 April 1708 (Note: "Although Dek (1962) and Dek (1970) place the marriage in Bayreuth on 20‑4‑1708 (date confirmed by Europäische Stammtafeln I, 117, Europäische Stammtafeln II, 88 and Knetsch (1931)), we find in the marriage contract that was signed in Siegen on 6‑8‑1708: «solches durch das Fürstliche Beylager mit öffentlichen und gewöhnlichen Christfürstlichen Ceremonien den 13. April des noch laufenden 1708 Jahres in der Fürstlichen Residenz zu Bayreuth vollzogen». The date 13 April is confirmed by the notification of the marriage (see State Archives Marburg 4f, Nassau-Siegen N. 241), dated Bayreuth 18‑4‑1708: «den 13. Aprilis allhier zu Bayreuth … durch würklich gehaltenes Beylager». See also in the Royal House Archive of the Netherlands (IV/1561), personalia: «den 13. April 1708 dero christfürstl. Beylager in Bayreuth». The registers of the Hofkirche in Bayreuth have disappeared.") to Duchess Amalie Louise of Courland.
2. Charles Louis Henry (17 March 1682 (Note: "See the registers of the Reformed Church of Siegen 1682: «getauft Domin. Lætare», without mentioning the date of birth. See State Archives Marburg (4f. Nassau-Siegen Nr. 203), notification dated 21‑3‑1682 «den 17 dieses», invitation for baptism «nächstkünftigen Sonntag». See Royal House Archive of the Netherlands (IV/1527), Personalia: «geb. den 17. März 1682, getauft 26 März» (which was indeed a Sunday in the old calendar). See State Archives Marburg (115, Waldeck 2, Nr. 338), notification dated Siegen 21‑3‑1682: «den 17. dieses nachts zw. 1 u. 2 Uhren», from which we can deduce without the risk of error that the birth took place in Siegen on 17‑3‑1682, old style.") – 18 October 1694), hopman of the company of Swiss soldiers in the Dutch States Army which had been his father's since 1691.

== Ancestors ==
Ancestors of Ernestine Charlotte of Nassau-Schaumburg
Great-great-grandparents	John VI 'the Elder' of Nassau-Siegen (1536–1606) ⚭ 1559; Elisabeth of Leuchtenberg (1537–1579)	Philip IV of Nassau-Saarbrücken (1542–1602) ⚭ 1563; Erica of Manderscheid (1545–1581)	William I of Sayn-Wittgenstein (1488–1570) ⚭ 1522; Johannetta of Isenburg-Grenzau (1500–1563)	Frederick Magnus I of Solms-Laubach (1521–1561) ⚭ 1545; Agnes of Wied (1524–1588)	? (?–?) ⚭ ? (?–?)	? (?–?) ⚭ ? (?–?)	? (?–?) ⚭ ? (?–?)	? (?–?) ⚭ ? (?–?)
Great-grandparents	George 'the Elder' of Nassau-Dillenburg (1562–1623) ⚭ 1584; Anne Amelie of Nassau-Saarbrücken (1565–1605)		Louis I of Sayn-Wittgenstein (1532–1605) ⚭ 1567; Elisabeth of Solms-Laubach (1549–1599)		Wilhelm Eppelmann (ca. 1564–1592) ⚭ 1576; Anna Lange (?–1636)		Johann Wilhelm von Efferen genannt Hall (?–?) ⚭ Margarethe von der Baalen genannt Bleck (?–?)	
Grandparents	Louis Henry of Nassau-Dillenburg (1594–1662) ⚭ 1615; Catharine of Sayn-Wittgenstein (1588–1651)				Peter Melander (1589–1648) ⚭ 1638; Agnes von Efferen genannt Hall (?–1656)			
Parents	Adolf of Nassau-Schaumburg (1629–1676) ⚭ 1653; Elisabeth Charlotte Melander (1640–1707)							

== Sources ==
- Aßmann, Helmut & Menk, Friedhelm (1996). Auf den Spuren von Nassau und Oranien in Siegen (in German). Siegen: Gesellschaft für Stadtmarketing Siegen e.V.
- Behr, Kamill (1854). Genealogie der in Europa regierenden Fürstenhäuser (in German). Leipzig: Verlag von Bernhard Tauchnitz.
- Blok, P.J. (1911). "Willem Maurits, Wilhelm Moritz". In Molhuysen, P.C. & Blok, P.J. (eds.). Nieuw Nederlandsch Biografisch Woordenboek (in Dutch). Vol. Eerste deel. Leiden: A.W. Sijthoff. p. 1578.
- Dek, A.W.E. (1962). Graf Johann der Mittlere von Nassau-Siegen und seine 25 Kinder (in German). Rijswijk: Krips Repro.
- Dek, A.W.E. (1968). "De afstammelingen van Juliana van Stolberg tot aan het jaar van de Vrede van Münster". Spiegel der Historie. Maandblad voor de geschiedenis der Nederlanden (in Dutch). 1968 (7/8): 228–303.
- Dek, A.W.E. (1970). Genealogie van het Vorstenhuis Nassau (in Dutch). Zaltbommel: Europese Bibliotheek.
- von Ehrenkrook, Hans Friedrich; Förster, Karl & Marchtaler, Kurt Erhard (1928). Ahnenreihen aus allen deutschen Gauen. Beilage zum Archiv für Sippenforschung und allen verwandten Gebieten (in German). Görlitz: Verlag für Sippenforschung und Wappenkunde C.A. Starke.
- Huberty, Michel; Giraud, Alain & Magdelaine, F. & B. (1981). l'Allemagne Dynastique (in French). Vol. Tome III: Brunswick-Nassau-Schwarzbourg. Le Perreux: Alain Giraud.
- Knetsch, Carl (1931). Das Haus Brabant. Genealogie der Herzoge von Brabant und der Landgrafen von Hessen (in German). Vol. II. Teil: Die Nachkommen Philipps des Grossmütigen. Darmstadt: Historischer Verein für das Großherzogtum Hessen.
- Lück, Alfred (1981) [1967]. Siegerland und Nederland (in German) (2nd ed.). Siegen: Siegerländer Heimatverein e.V.
- Lück, Alfred & Wunderlich, Hermann (1956) [1952]. Die Fürstengruft zu Siegen (in German). Siegen: Verkehrsverein Siegen e.V.
- Menk, Friedhelm (1971). Quellen zur Geschichte des Siegerlandes im niederländischen königlichen Hausarchiv (in German). Siegen: Stadt Siegen/Forschungsstelle Siegerland.
- Menk, Friedhelm (2004). "Die Fürstengruft zu Siegen und die darin von 1669 bis 1781 erfolgten Beisetzungen". In Burwitz, Ludwig; Menk, Friedhelm; Opfermann, Ulrich Friedrich; Pfau, Dieter & Plaum, Bernd D. (eds.). Siegener Beiträge. Jahrbuch für regionale Geschichte (in German). Vol. 9. Siegen: Geschichtswerkstatt Siegen – Arbeitskreis für Regionalgeschichte e.V. pp. 183–202. ISSN 1431-6684.
- Gräfin zu Stolberg-Stolberg, Sophie Eleonore & von Arnswaldt, Werner Konstantin (1927–1935). Katalog der fürstlich Stolberg-Stolberg'schen Leichenpredigten-Sammlung (in German). Leipzig: Verlag Degener & Co.
- Textor von Haiger, Johann (1617). Nassauische Chronik (in German). Herborn: Christoph Raab.
- Vorsterman van Oyen, A.A. (1882). Het vorstenhuis Oranje-Nassau. Van de vroegste tijden tot heden (in Dutch). Leiden/Utrecht: A.W. Sijthoff/J.L. Beijers.

Ernestine Charlotte of Nassau-Schaumburg House of Nassau-Schaumburg Born: 20 May 1662^{Jul.} Died: 21 February 1732
Regnal titles
Vacant Title last held by Christiane of Erbach	Fürstin of Nassau-Siegen (Protestant branch); 10/20 December 1679 – 23 January 1691^{Jul.}	Vacant Title next held by Elisabeth Juliana Francisca of Hesse-Homburg
Succession of underage son	Fürstin-Regent of Nassau-Siegen (Protestant branch); 23 January 1691^{Jul.} – 20 February 1701	Son became of age
