= Victor I of Anhalt-Bernburg-Schaumburg-Hoym =

Victor I
- Prince of Anhalt-Bernburg-Schaumburg-Hoym
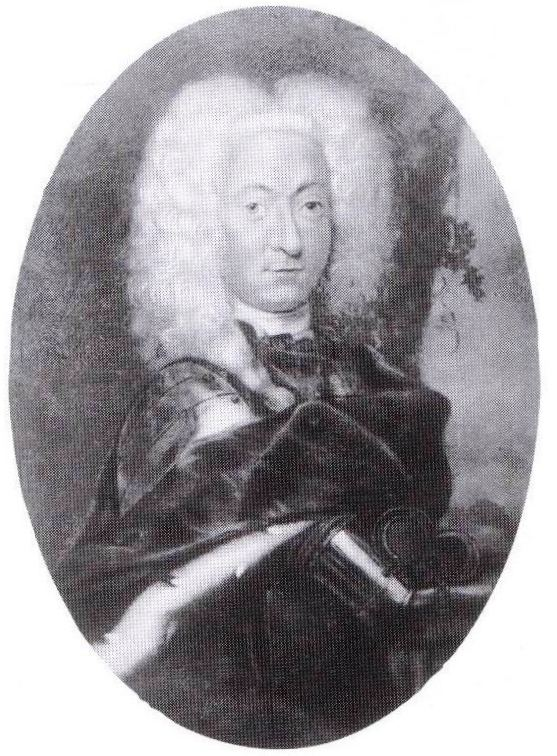
- Victor I, Prince of Anhalt-Bernburg-Schaumburg-Hoym
- Born: 7 September 1693; Schaumburg
- Died: 15 April 1772 (aged 78); Schaumburg
- Spouse: Charlotte Louise of Isenburg-Büdingen-Birstein; Hedwig Sophie Henckel of Donnersmarck
- Issue: Victoria Charlotte, Margravine of Brandenburg-Bayreuth; Louise Amalie; Lebrecht; Christian, Hereditary Prince of Anhalt-Bernburg-Schaumburg-Hoym; Karl Louis, Prince of Anhalt-Bernburg-Schaumburg-Hoym; Franz Adolph; Frederick, Prince of Anhalt-Bernburg-Schaumburg-Hoym; Sophie Charlotte Ernestine, Princess of Isenburg-Birstein; Victor Amadeus; Hedwig Auguste; George Augustus
Names
- German: Viktor Amadeus Adolf
- House: Ascania
- Father: Lebrecht, Prince of Anhalt-Zeitz-Hoym
- Mother: Charlotte of Nassau-Schaumburg

Victor I, Prince of Anhalt-Bernburg-Schaumburg-Hoym (Schaumburg, 7 September 1693 – Schaumburg, 15 April 1772), was a German prince of the House of Ascania who belonged to a cadet branch of the princely house of Anhalt-Bernburg.

Through his mother, he inherited the County of Holzappel and Lordship of Schaumburg and founded the cadet branch of Anhalt-Bernburg-Schaumburg-Hoym.

== Early life and ancestry ==
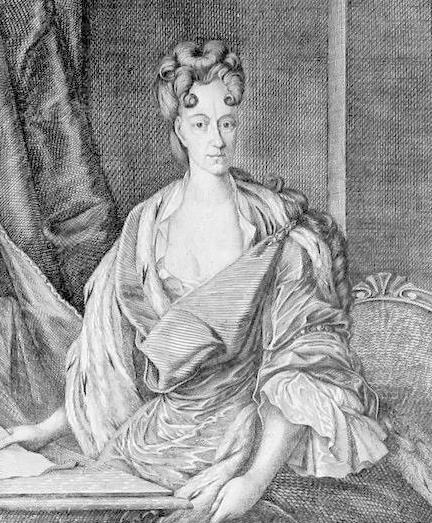
Charlotte Louise of Isenburg-Büdingen-Birstein princess of Anhalt-Bernburg-Schaumburg-Hoym, the first wife of Victor I

Victor was born at Schaumburg Castle on 7 September 1693 as the eldest son of Lebrecht, Prince of Anhalt-Zeitz-Hoym by his first wife Princess Charlotte of Nassau-Dillenburg-Schaumburg, heiress of the County of Holzappel and Lordship of Schaumburg as a daughter of Elisabeth Charlotte, Countess of Holzappel in her marriage with Adolph, Prince of Nassau-Schaumburg.

== Reign ==
The death of his mother in 1700 made Victor Amadeus Adolph the heir apparent of Holzappel and Schaumburg under the terms of a contract made between his paternal grandfather and namesake Prince Victor Amadeus of Anhalt-Bernburg and his maternal grandmother Countess Elisabeth Charlotte. When the Countess died in 1707, Victor Amadeus Adolph succeeded her as Count of Holzappel and Schaumburg.

When his father died in 1727, Victor Amadeus Adolph succeeded him as "Prince of Anhalt-Zeitz-Hoym," but shortly after changed the name of his principality to "Anhalt-Bernburg-Schaumburg-Hoym."

== Marriages and Issue ==
=== First marriage ===
In Birstein on 22 November 1714 Victor Amadeus Adolph married firstly with Countess Charlotte Louise of Isenburg-Büdingen-Birstein (b. Büdingen, 31 July 1680 - d. Schaumburg, 2 January 1739), daughter of Wilhelm Moritz, Count of Isenburg-Büdingen-Birstein (1657-1711) and his first wife, Countess Anna Amalie of Isenburg-Büdingen-Wächtersbach (1653-1700). She was fourteen years older than he was; nevertheless, the union produced six children:

1. Victoria Charlotte (b. Schaumburg, 25 September 1715 - d. Schaumburg, 4 February 1792), married on 26 April 1732 to Frederick Christian, Margrave of Brandenburg-Bayreuth. They divorced in 1764.
2. Louise Amalie (b. Schaumburg, 10 October 1717 - d. Lich, 1 September 1721).
3. Lebrecht (b. Schaumburg, 26 August 1718 - d. Schaumburg, 5 October 1721).
4. Christian, Hereditary Prince of Anhalt-Bernburg-Schaumburg-Hoym (b. Schaumburg, 30 June 1720 - d. Schaumburg, 13 April 1758).
5. Karl Louis, Prince of Anhalt-Bernburg-Schaumburg-Hoym (b. Schaumburg, 16 May 1723 - d. Schaumburg, 20 August 1806).
6. Franz Adolph (b. Schaumburg, 7 July 1724 - d. Halle an der Saale, 22 April 1784).

=== Second marriage ===
In Pölzig, Thuringia, on 14 February 1740 Victor Amadeus Adolph married for a second time to Countess Hedwig Sophie Henckel of Donnersmarck (b. Oderberg, 7 May 1717 - d. Diez, 21 February 1795), daughter of Count Wenzel Louis Henckel of Donnersmarck (1680-1734) and his wife, Countess Hedwig Charlotte of Solms-Baruth (1678-1734). The Henckel von Donnersmarck family were an old family in Silesia, but raised only in 1651 to the rank of counts; in consequence, this marriage was on the verge of being considered morganatic. In the end, the union was nonetheless considered equal by the rest of the House of Anhalt. They had six children:

1. Frederick, Prince of Anhalt-Bernburg-Schaumburg-Hoym (b. Schaumburg, 29 November 1741 - d. Homburg vor der Höhe, 24 December 1812).
2. Sophie Charlotte Ernestine (b. Schaumburg, 3 April 1743 - d. Birstein, 5 October 1781), married on 20 September 1760 to Wolfgang Ernest II, Prince of Isenburg-Büdingen-Birstein (b. Birstein, 17 November 1735 – d. Offenbach, 3 February 1803).
3. Victor Amadeus (b. Schaumburg, 21 May 1744 - killed in action at Partakoski, 2 May 1790).
4. Karl (b. and d. Schaumburg, 4 August 1745).
5. Hedwig Auguste (b. Schaumburg, 6 May 1747 - d. Schaumburg, 5 March 1760).
6. George Augustus (b. Schaumburg, 6 November 1751 - d. Schaumburg, 29 October 1754).

== Bibliography ==
- Ferdinand Siebigk: Das Herzogthum Anhalt, p. 242, Dessau 1867
- Victor Amadeus Adolph. In Johann Heinrich Zedler: Grosses vollständiges Universal-Lexicon Aller Wissenschafften und Künste. Band 48, Leipzig 1746, Spalte 971 f.
- Allgemeines genealogisches und Staats-Handbuch, p. 241ff. Digitalisat

Victor I of Anhalt-Bernburg-Schaumburg-Hoym House of Ascania Born: 7 September 1693 Died: 15 April 1772
Preceded by Elisabeth Charlotte	Count of Holzappel; 1707–1772	Succeeded by Charles Louis
Preceded by Lebrecht	Prince of Anhalt-Zeitz-Hoym; 1727	Succeeded by Principality change of name
Preceded by New creation	Prince of Anhalt-Bernburg-Schaumburg-Hoym; 1727–1772	Succeeded by Charles Louis
