= Karl Frederick, Prince of Anhalt-Bernburg =

Charles Frederick
- Prince of Anhalt-Bernburg
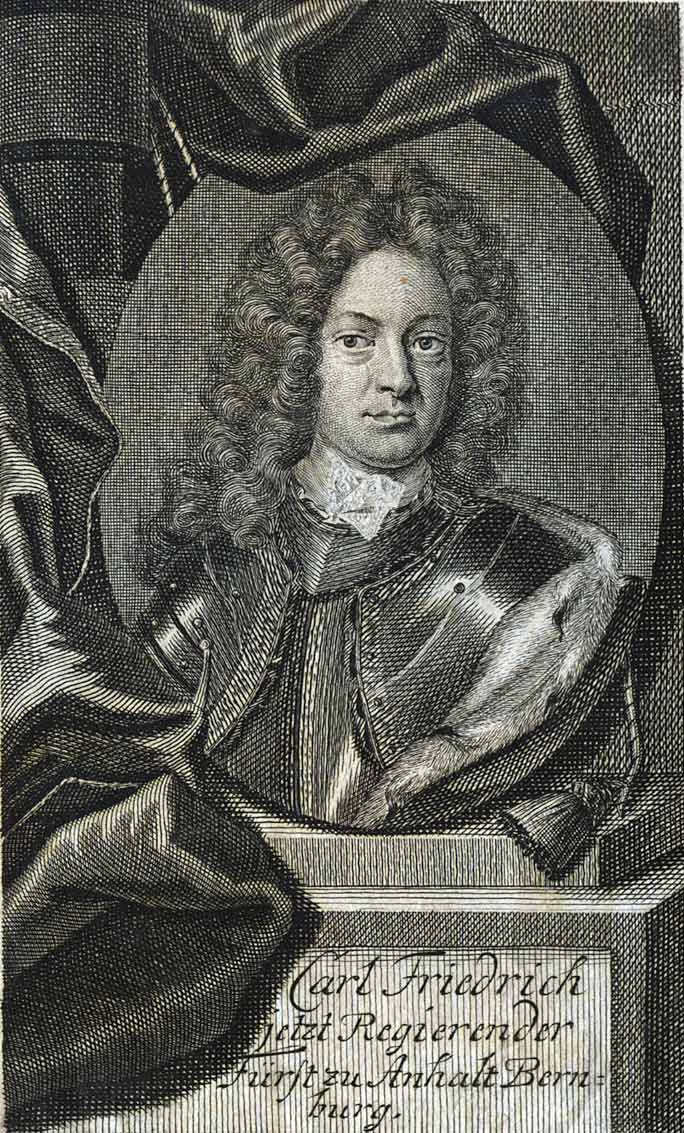
- Portrait of Karl Frederick, Prince of Anhalt-Bernburg

Prince of Anhalt-Bernburg
- Reign: 14 February 1718 – 22 April 1721
- Predecessor: Victor Amadeus
- Successor: Victor Frederick
- Born: 13 July 1668; Bernburg, Anhalt-Bernburg
- Died: 22 April 1721 (aged 52); Bernburg, Anhalt-Bernburg
- Spouse: Sophie Albertine of Solms-Sonnenwalde; Wilhelmine Charlotte Nüssler
- Issue: Elisabeth, Princess of Schwarzburg-Sondershausen; Prince Frederick William; Charlotte Sophie, Princess of Schwarzburg-Sondershausen-Ebeleben; Princess Auguste Wilhelmine of Anhalt-Bernburg; Victor Frederick, Prince of Anhalt-Bernburg; Fredericka Henriette, Princess of Anhalt-Köthen; Imperial Count Frederick of Bährenfeld; Imperial Count Charles Leopold of Bährenfeld
Names
- German: Karl Friedrich
- House: House of Ascania
- Father: Victor Amadeus, Prince of Anhalt-Bernburg
- Mother: Elizabeth of Palatinate-Zweibrücken

Karl Frederick of Anhalt-Bernburg (13 July 1668 – 22 April 1721) was a German prince of the House of Ascania and ruler of the principality of Anhalt-Bernburg.

He was born in Bernburg, the eldest son of Victor Amadeus, Prince of Anhalt-Bernburg, by his wife Elizabeth of Palatinate-Zweibrücken, daughter of Frederick, Count Palatine of Zweibrücken.

== Life ==
After the death of his father in 1718, the fifty-year-old Karl Frederick inherited Anhalt-Bernburg. His reign, which lasted only two years until his death, was unremarkable.

== Marriages and Issue ==
In Bernburg on 25 June 1692 Karl Frederick married his cousin Countess Sophie Albertine of Solms-Sonnewalde (b. Sonnenwalde, 2 October 1672 - d. Bernburg, 12 June 1708), daughter of George Frederick, Count of Solms-Sonnewalde, by his wife, Princess Anna Sophia of Anhalt-Bernburg (sister of his father Victor Amadeus, and daughter of Christian II, Prince of Anhalt-Bernburg). They had six children:

1. Elisabeth Albertine (b. Bernburg, 31 March 1693 - d. Arnstadt, 7 July 1774), married on 2 October 1712 to Günther XLIII, Prince of Schwarzburg-Sondershausen.
2. Frederick William (b. Bernburg, 3 September 1694 - d. Bernburg, 28 December 1694).
3. Charlotte Sophie (b. Bernburg, 21 May 1696 - d. Sondershausen, 22 July 1762), married on 19 July 1721 to Augustus I Günther, Prince of Schwarzburg-Sondershausen-Ebeleben.
4. Auguste Wilhelmine (b. Bernburg, 3 November 1697 - d. Harzgerode, 22 June 1767).
5. Victor Frederick, Prince of Anhalt-Bernburg (b. Bernburg, 20 September 1700 - d. Bernburg, 18 May 1765).
6. Frederica Henriette (b. Bernburg, 24 November 1702 - d. Köthen, 4 April 1723), married on 11 December 1721 to Leopold, Prince of Anhalt-Köthen.

From 1711 Karl Frederick began to live with Wilhelmine Charlotte Nüssler (b. Harzgerode, 10 May 1683 - d. Gernrode, 30 May 1740), the daughter of a non-noble chancery counselor. They had two sons:

1. Frederick ["Imperial Count of Bährnfeld" from 12 June 1723] (b. Harzgerode, 13 March 1712 - d. Gernrode, 8 September 1758). Born illegitimate, he was legitimized after the wedding of their parents.
2. Karl Leopold ["Imperial Count of Bährnfeld" since 12 June 1723] (b. Plötzkau, 1 July 1717 - d. Kassel, 3 October 1769).

Karl Frederick and Wilhelmine Charlotte married secretly in Bernburg on 1 May 1715 and Karl Frederick immediately tried to have his wife raised to the rank of countess by the Emperor. When Prince Victor Amadeus learned of his son's actions, he wrote to the Emperor on 15 November 1715 to prevent the elevation, and added a codicil to his testament dated 13 July 1716 denying the children of the union any succession rights. The Emperor approved this codicil one year later, on 15 July 1717.

The Emperor also sent a rescript to Karl Frederick dated 20 August 1717 instructing him not to call his wife princess or their sons princes. Nevertheless, after his father died in 1718, Karl Frederick obtained from the Emperor a patent to elevate his wife to the title Countess of Ballenstedt (German: Gräfin von Ballenstedt) on 19 December 1719, and their two sons to the rank of Imperial Counts of Bährnfeld (German: Reichsgrafen von Bährnfeld) on 12 June 1723; this, however, without prejudice of the rights of the agnates. Karl Frederick died in Ballenstedt, and in 1722, the Reichshofrat forbade his widow to use the princely title for herself or her sons.

However, on 16 November 1742, the Emperor Charles VII raised the Counts of Bährenfeld to the rank of Princes of Anhalt-Bernburg with all rights of succession. Victor I, Prince of Anhalt-Bernburg-Schaumburg-Hoym, protested, but the Emperor died in 1745. The Prince brought up the matter to the College of Electors gathered in 1745, but they declined to take up the matter in the electoral capitulation. He then brought the matter to the Reichshofrat, which ruled on 6 May 1748 by repealing the diploma of 1742 and forbidding the Counts of Bährenfeld from calling themselves Princes of Bernburg or Princes of Anhalt-Bernburg, and allowing them only to call themselves Princes of Bährenfeld. They died unmarried.

== Sources ==
Karl Frederick, Prince of Anhalt-Bernburg House of Ascania Born: 13 July 1668 Died: 22 April 1721
Preceded by Victor Amadeus	Prince of Anhalt-Bernburg; 1718–1721	Succeeded by Victor Frederick
