= Lebrecht, Prince of Anhalt-Zeitz-Hoym =

Lebrecht
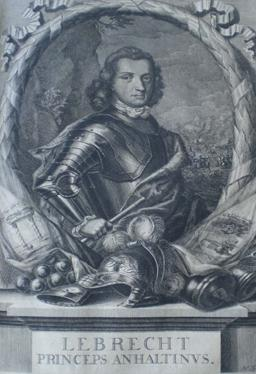
- Lebrecht, Prince of Anhalt-Zeitz-Hoym

Prince of Anhalt-Zeitz-Hoym
- Reign: 1718–1727
- Predecessor: none
- Successor: Victor I
- Born: 28 June 1669; Bernburg, Anhalt-Bernburg
- Died: 17 May 1727 (aged 57); Bad Ems
- Spouse: Charlotte of Nassau-Schaumburg; Baroness Eberhardine of Weede; Sophie Sibylla of Ingersleben
- Issue: Victor I, Prince of Anhalt-Bernburg-Schaumburg-Hoym; Prince Frederick William; Princess Elisabeth Charlotte; Prince Christian; Princess Victoria Hedwig; Princess Victoria Sophie; Charlotte Wilhelmine, Landgravine of Hesse-Philippsthal-Barchfeld; Prince John George; Prince Joseph Karl; Sophie Christine Eberhardine, Princess of Schwarzburg-Sondershausen; Prince Victor Lebrecht
- House: Ascania
- Father: Victor Amadeus, Prince of Anhalt-Bernburg
- Mother: Elizabeth of Palatinate-Zweibrücken

Lebrecht, Prince of Anhalt-Zeitz-Hoym (Bernburg, 28 June 1669 – Bad Ems, 17 May 1727), was a German prince of the House of Ascania.

The second son of Victor Amadeus, Prince of Anhalt-Bernburg and Elizabeth of Palatinate-Zweibrücken, he married Charlotte of Nassau-Schaumburg, heiress to the County of Holzappel and Lordship of Schaumburg and founded a cadet branch of the House of Anhalt-Bernburg later named Anhalt-Bernburg-Schaumburg-Hoym.

== Life ==
Lebrecht was born on 28 June 1669 in Bernburg as the second son of Victor Amadeus, Prince of Anhalt-Bernburg by his wife Elizabeth of Palatinate-Zweibrücken, daughter of Frederick, Count Palatine of Zweibrücken.

Excluded from the government of the principality of Anhalt-Bernburg after the introduction of primogeniture, Lebrecht acquired in 1707 the towns of Belleben, Hoym, Reinstedt, and Frose as compensation. When his father died in 1718, Lebrecht also inherited the town of Zeitz.

== Marriages and issue ==
=== First marriage ===
By a contract made on 1 September 1690 between his father and Elisabeth Charlotte Melander, Countess of Holzappel, Lebrecht was betrothed to Charlotte (b. Schaumburg, 28 September 1673 – d. Bernburg, 31 January 1700), the youngest of the three surviving daughters of the Countess with her late husband, Adolph, Prince of Nassau-Schaumburg. Under the terms of that contract, Charlotte was declared the sole heiress of the County of Holzappel (which included the towns of Holzappel and Charlottenberg) and the Lordship of Schaumburg. The marriage was performed in Schaumburg on 12 April 1692. They had five children:

1. Victor I Amadeus Adolph, Prince of Anhalt-Bernburg-Schaumburg-Hoym (b. Schaumburg, 7 September 1693 – d. Schaumburg, 15 April 1772).
2. Frederick William (b. Schaumburg, 12 April 1695 – killed in action at Denain, 24 July 1712).
3. Elisabeth Charlotte (b. Bernburg, 4 December 1696 – d. Schaumburg, 14 June 1754).
4. Christian (b. Bernburg, 27 November 1698 – killed in action at Palermo, 29 April 1720).
5. Victoria Hedwig (b. Bernburg, 30 January 1700 – d. Schaumburg, 10 February 1701).

Charlotte died in 1700, before the death of her mother, Elisabeth Charlotte of Holzappel-Schaumburg, making her eldest son Victor the heir apparent of Holzappel and Schaumburg. When Countess Elisabeth Charlotte died in 1707, Victor Amadeus Adolph succeeded her as Count of Holzappel and Schaumburg.

=== Second marriage ===
A widower, Lebrecht was serving in the Netherlands when he fell in love with Baroness Eberhardine Jacobine Wilhelmine of Weede (b. Grave, 9 August 1685 – d. Grave, 13 February 1724), daughter of Baron Johann Georg von Weede, Governor of Grave (created a Baron by the Emperor in 1675; a Protestant himself, but married to a Catholic noblewoman Agnes Margaretha von Raesfeld, who raised their daughter in that religion). The couple was married in Grave on 27 June 1702. They had six children:

1. Victoria Sophie (b. Zeitz, 10 January 1704 – d. Zeitz, 18 May 1704).
2. Charlotte Wilhelmine (b. Schaumburg, 24 November 1704 – d. Barchfeld, 11 November 1766), married on 31 October 1724 to William, Landgrave of Hesse-Philippsthal-Barchfeld.
3. John George (b. Zeitz, 30 October 1705 – d. Zeitz, 18 May 1707).
4. Joseph Karl (b. Zeitz, 26 December 1706 – d. Zeitz, 18 February 1737).
5. Sophie Christine Eberhardine (b. Zeitz, 6 February 1710 – d. Neustadt an der Orla, 26 October 1784), married on 10 November 1728 to Christian, Prince of Schwarzburg-Sondershausen, son of Christian William I, Prince of Schwarzburg-Sondershausen.
6. Victor Lebrecht (b. Zeitz, 7 November 1711 – d. Zeitz, 5 December 1737).

By contract of 23 February 1703, Lebrecht explained that after the death of his wife he wished not to remarry, so as not to diminish the possessions of the House of Anhalt through further partitions; but he found a way to reconcile his conscience with this intention by marrying a person who only looked for companionship in marriage and had no desire for princely rank. Remarriages with persons of unequal rank after a first equal marriage leaving posterity were not unusual in Germany, and under these conditions he obtained the consent of his father to this union.

The contract, signed by a notary and two witnesses, specified that the Baroness of Weede would not usurp the rank of princess or seek to be raised to that rank but would remain a baroness under the name of "Baroness of Bähringen," and never use the name, title, or arms of Anhalt for herself. A sum of 45,000 Thalers was set for her upkeep and that of her children, which would be used to purchase a suitable estate. Should she die without heirs, or at the extinction of her issue, the sum or the estate purchased with it would be returned to her husband and his heirs.

This contract notwithstanding, Lebrecht sought and obtained from the Emperor her elevation to the rank of Countess with the style of "Hoch- und Wohlgebohren" and new arms (1 August 1705). Lebrecht's father fought in vain to have this elevation reversed.

After the death of Lebrecht, the two surviving sons from his marriage with the Countess of Weede obtained the Bailiwick of Zeitz, but both died unmarried and childless.

=== Third marriage ===
On 14 September 1725 Lebrecht married for a third time and again morganatically to Sophie Sibylla of Ingersleben (b. 18 March? 1684 – d. Hoym, 31 March 1726), a court lady at his court and daughter of Just Adam of Ingersleben, of an old and well-established Anhalt nobility. Despite all the efforts of her husband, the Reichshofrat denied Sophie the right to the styles "princely" and "Durchlaucht". Lebrecht survived her by only fourteen months.

Lebrecht, Prince of Anhalt-Zeitz-Hoym House of Ascania Born: 28 June 1669 Died: 17 May 1727
Preceded by Victor Amadeus	Prince of Anhalt-Zeitz-Hoym; 1718–1727	Succeeded by Victor I
