= Siege of Varna =

Siege of Varna may refer to:

- Siege of Varna (1201), during the Byzantine–Bulgarian wars
- Storming of Varna (1773), during the Russo-Turkish War of 1768–1774
- Siege of Varna (1828), during the Russo-Turkish War of 1828–1829
