= Victor Amadeus of Anhalt-Bernburg-Schaumburg-Hoym =

German prince

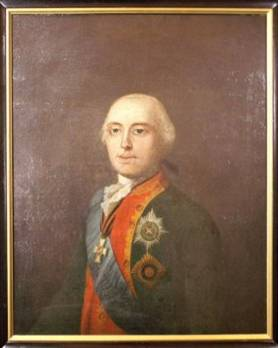
Victor Amadeus of Anhalt-Bernburg-Schaumburg-Hoym

Victor Amadeus of Anhalt-Bernburg-Schaumburg-Hoym (21 May 1744 in Schaumburg – 2 May 1790), was a German prince of the House of Ascania from the Anhalt-Bernburg branch through the sub-branch of Anhalt-Bernburg-Schaumburg-Hoym and a Russian General under the service of Empress Catherine II the Great.

He was the sixth (but fifth surviving) son of Victor I Amadeus Adolph, Prince of Anhalt-Bernburg-Schaumburg-Hoym, and the third-born by his second wife, Countess Hedwig Sophie Henckel of Donnersmarck.

== Life ==
As the youngest of the sons of Prince Victor I, Victor Amadeus had little chances to inherit any of the family lands. He thus chose to follow a military career and entered in the Russian army in 1772. In 1773, he participated in the failed storming of Varna.

On 10 July 1775 Victor Amadeus was appointed Major General and four months later, on 26 November, he was awarded with the Order of Saint George IV Class for his remarkable services. On 28 June 1782 he was appointed Lieutenant General.

Since the beginning of the Turkish campaign of Prince Potemkin, in 1788, Victor Amadeus entered in his army and distinguished himself in the Battle of Ochakov, where he was commander of the first two columns during the assault and put them on the walls of the fortress; for this, he was awarded on 16 December 1788 with the Order of Saint George II Class.

The following year, Victor Amadeus took an active part in the capture of the towns of Căuşeni, Akkerman and Bender, and was rewarded for his distinction with the Orders of St. Alexander Nevsky and St. Andrew

In 1790 the Prince joined to the army of Count Ivan Saltykov in Finland, the theater of the Russo-Swedish War. This was his last military action: at the beginning of hostilities, Victor Amadeus sent a detachment to drive the enemy from Pardakoski and Kernikoski and, on 18 April, while the troops were attacking the Swedish, he was fatally wounded in his right leg, and was forced to leave the field of battle, dying several days later.

The name of the Prince of Anhalt-Bernburg-Schaumburg-Hoym was closely linked with the famous Russian general Barclay de Tolly, who began active service under his direct command. Victor Amadeus was the first one who drew attention to the military talents of Barclay; when the Prince was dying, he gave to Barclay his sword, with which he never parted.

== Marriage and issue ==
In Schaumburg on 21 April 1778 Victor Amadeus married Magdalena Sophie (b. Braunfels, 4 June 1742 - d. Homburg vor der Höhe, 21 January 1819), daughter of Frederick William, Prince of Solms-Braunfels. They had one son:

1. Victor Amadeus (b. Homburg vor der Höhe, 19 June 1779 - d. Homburg vor der Höhe, 4 March 1783).

== Bibliography ==
- Brockhaus and Efron Encyclopedic Dictionary: In 86 volumes (82 vols. and 4 additional) - St. Petersburg: 1890–1907.
- Ганкевич В.Ю. Генерал-поручик Віктор Амадей Ангальт-Бернбург-Шаумбург-Хойм: (призабута біографія генерала катерининської доби) // Ученые записки Таврического национального университета им. В.И. Вернадского. Серия "Исторические науки". - 2011. - Том 24 (63). No. 1, спецвыпуск "История Украины". – С. 3 – 22. (PDF)
- Ганкевич В. Ю. Принц Виктор Амадей Ангальт-Бернбург-Шаймбург-Хоймский соратник и учитель российских полководцев – героев Отечественной войны 1812 года // Российская империя в исторической ретроспективе: Вып. VIII. – Белгород: ГиК, 2013. – С. 33–37. (ISBN 978-5-902583-98-1)
