= Battle of Triebl =

1647 battle of the Thirty Years' War

Coordinates: 49°49′12″N 12°50′23″E

- Part of the Thirty Years' War
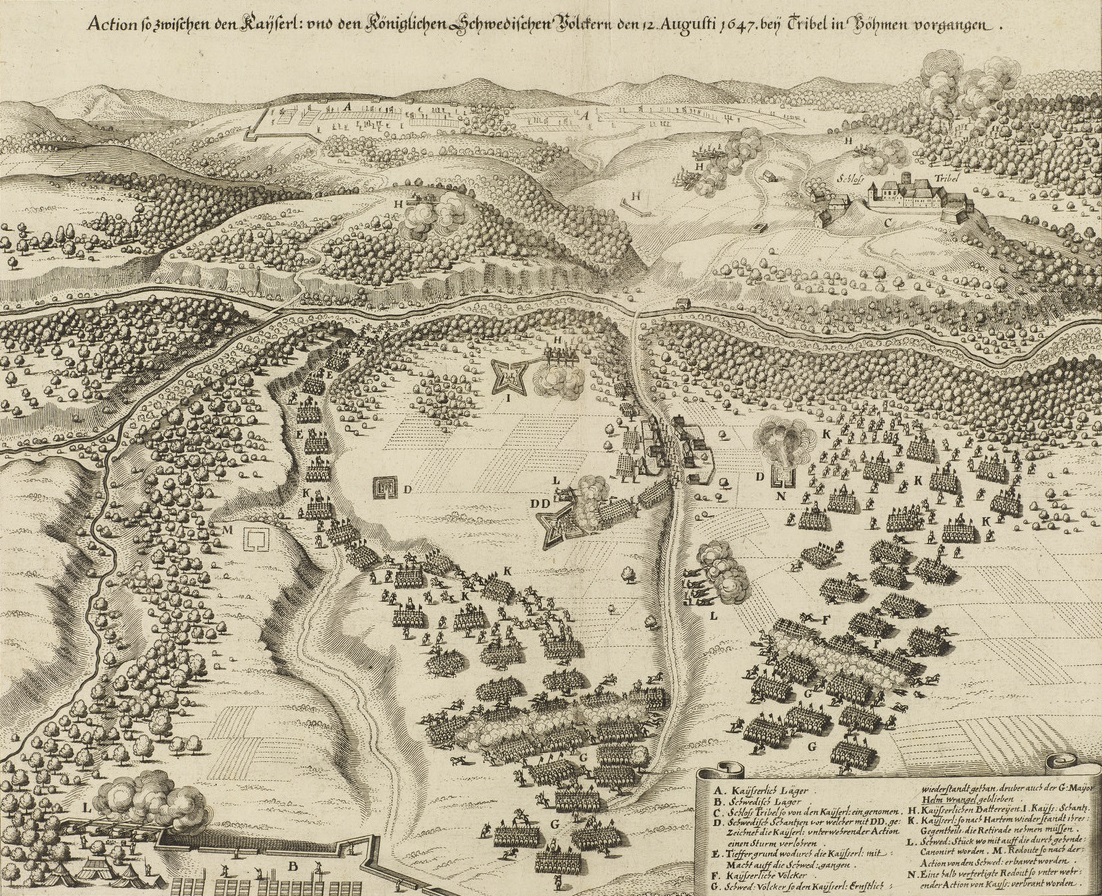
- Engraving made by Matthäus Merian the Younger
Date	22 August 1647
Location	Triebl, Bohemia, Holy Roman Empire
Result	See Aftermath

Belligerents
Holy Roman Empire	Swedish Empire

Commanders and leaders
(Holy Roman Empire) Peter Melander von Holzappel (Holy Roman Empire) Raimondo Montecuccoli (Holy Roman Empire) Johann von Werth	(Swedish Empire) Carl Gustaf Wrangel (Swedish Empire) Helmut Wrangel †

Strength
9,000; 8 guns	10 cavalry regiments 1,500 infantry

Casualties and losses
200 killed and wounded 200 killed 100 wounded	155 killed 225 wounded 1,000 killed and wounded 300 captured 13 standards

The Battle of Triebl or Battle of Třebel took place on 22 August 1647 during the Thirty Years' War. Imperial cavalry under Raimondo Montecuccoli and Johann von Werth launched a surprise attack on the Swedish camp of Carl Gustaf Wrangel and inflicted 380, or more than 1,300, losses on them in exchange for 200–300 casualties. Both sides claimed victory after the battle. The Imperial attack helped convince Maximilian I, Elector of Bavaria to abandon the Truce of Ulm in September and rejoin the war on the Imperial side.

== Background ==
On 17 July 1647, the defense of the imperial base Eger in Bohemia collapsed after attacks by the Swedish besiegers. The advance of the relieving Imperial army through western Bohemia had been delayed by waiting for the arrival of general Johann von Werth's defecting Bavarian troops, so that the Swedish general Carl Gustaf Wrangel had sufficient opportunity to prepare the defense of the southern approaches to Eger. Emperor Ferdinand III sometimes accompanied his troops personally on the march, which increased morale. The approaches to Eger were shielded from the south by strong Swedish cavalry and Imperial attacks fizzled out.

On 8 August 1647 the Imperial relief force retired to the south and encamped at Křimiz and Tuschkau on the Pilsen plain. General Wrangel pursued the imperial forces and crossed the Königswarter Pass with his army. There he rounded up all the farmers he could find and forced them to expand the entrenchments. Wrangel left a strong garrison there and continued the march south with the main forces. On 13 August he moved into his headquarters in Plan. The troops camped near St. Anne's Church. To improve security, however, the camp was demolished again and relocated to the nearby Bahuschaberg on 16 August.

Ten cavalry regiments and 1,500 infantry now took up positions between the villages of Schlief, Wieschka, Hangendorf and Goldwag on the other side of the Michelsberger Bach. They holed up there and set up a wide ring of field guards around the camp. An ensign with three dozen horsemen was deployed as a crew in Triebl Castle, which is on a steep slope across the stream.

General Wrangel had already promised the city fathers of Plan his protection on 14 June. Under threat of severe punishment, he had forbidden his troops to billet, requisition, and pillage. Any use of force against the civilian population should be punished ruthlessly. This letter of protection was an enormous reassurance for the citizens of Plan, as the Swedish army was far from military discipline and order after the death of King Gustavus Adolphus. The military officials were very busy to punish all offenses.

Emperor Ferdinand III had learned of the Swedes' advance south. Fearing the loss of western Bohemia, he ordered his army to march north and attack the Swedish forces. Under the leadership of Commander-in-Chief Peter Melander von Holzappel and Generals Raimondo Montecuccoli and Johann von Werth, who had resigned from the service of Bavaria, the Imperial army advanced and moved via Mies, Schweing and Tschernoschin to the plateau of Wolfersdorf, where it holed up. An advance division, to which Johann von Schwanberg belonged, fought with Swedish troops between Plan and Triebl near the Spittelteich pond. In the course of the bitter struggle Johann von Schwanberg was seriously wounded.

== Prelude ==
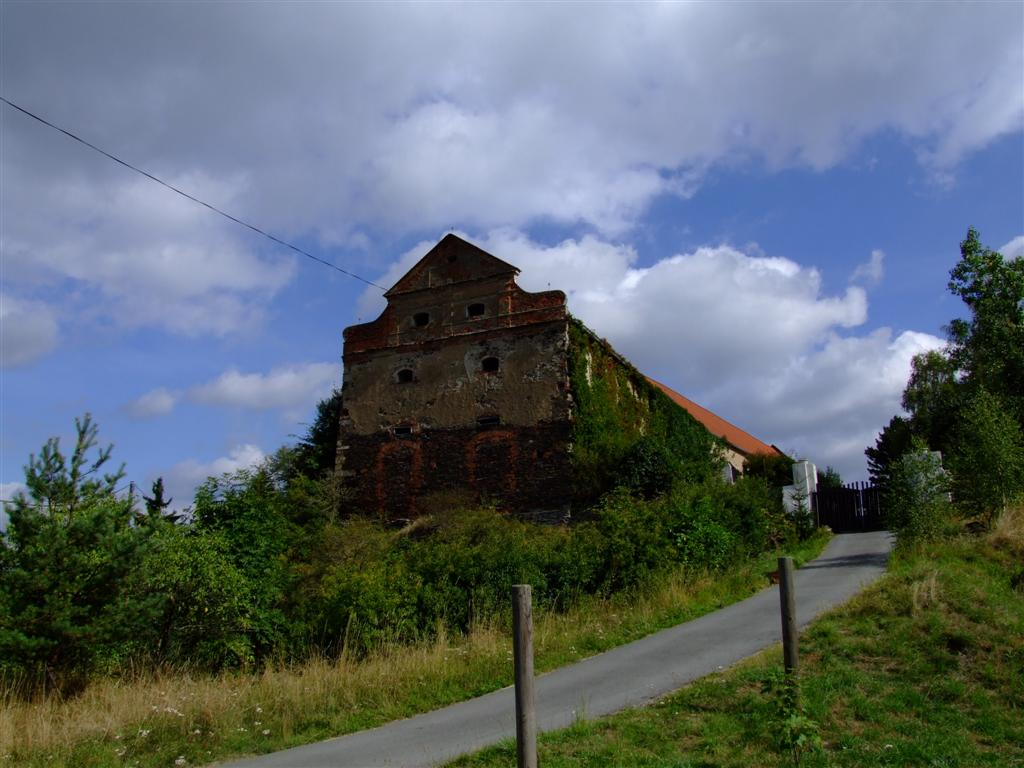
Třebel Castle, taken in August 2008

The results of the investigation soon made the Imperial troops aware of Wrangel's positions and it was obvious that Triebl Castle, which served as an advanced observation post, had to be captured. Holzappel immediately ordered guns to be set up on the northern slope of the Wolfsberg. The shelling of Triebl began on 18 August at around 2 p.m.

The Swedish crew found themselves helpless in the face of the bombardment, as they only had 2 field cannons of smaller caliber, with which one could not reach the long-range guns of the Imperial armed forces. The bombardment lasted into the evening hours. After the ceasefire began, the Swedes set about making makeshift repairs to their fortress in order to withstand the onslaught.

At dawn on 19 August, Holzappel's gunners continued to fire. Under cover of darkness, the Imperial infantry had worked their way up to the castle and completed the preparations for the storm. The Swedish ensign waited in vain for help, because the deep and impassable bottom of the Michelsberg brook makes it impossible to intervene quickly.

A direct hit in the wall of the castle caused it to collapse and buried 12 Swedish soldiers. The ensign decided to give up the castle. He had the horses killed beforehand so as not to let them fall into the hands of the enemy. Shortly afterwards a white flag was shown and surrendered.

== Battle ==
The advancing Imperial troops immediately began to entrench themselves on the Triebl. Meanwhile, Swedish gunners brought two guns through the mud at enormous expense in order to recapture the castle. The castle's crew sortied out and took control of both cannons and their operators. On 21 August scouts brought the news that most of the Swedes had been spread out in the surrounding countryside to get food and provisions. Montecuccoli and Werth were immediately determined to seize the opportunity and storm the Swedish positions, perhaps even the main camp.

A force of 8,000 horsemen, 1,000 Croatian musketeers and 8 small field cannons were hastily assembled. A local woman, the wife of the village judge von Triebl, led the armed forces under the protection of the wooded gorge into the bottom of the Michelsberg brook before daybreak. The troops initially hid there. The Swedish guards took over from one another in complete ignorance when the valuable horsemen - under the protection of the musketeers - broke into them. The first attack defeated the two regiments Wittenberg and Margrave Durlach. The breakthrough into the main camp succeeded. The Didemann, Kinsky and Jordan regiments stood there but also fell victim to the onrushing cavalry. A squadron of the Steinbock cavalry regiment tried to stop the attackers, and was also shattered. The Swedes were on the run and were pursued as far as Hangendorf. During the advance, the imperial troops captured a large amount of war material and personal property of the Swedish soldiers. In addition, 4 standards of the Jordan Regiment, 3 standards of the Durlach Regiment and 1 standard each of the Wittenberg, Didemann and Steinbock regiments fell into their hands.

When General Wrangel heard of the defeat, he gathered all available riders to rush to the aid of his fleeing riders. He succeeded in bringing the broken regiments to a standstill and organizing a counterattack in which the heads of the Imperial troops who had been chased back were repulsed. He suffered bloody losses again in a new battle. General Holzappel intervened too late with his Croatian musketeers. After two hours the Swedish troops succeeded in gaining a foothold on a broad front, but the Witkopf and Alexander Lilien regiments suffered heavy losses.

The Swedes acknowledged 155 killed and 225 wounded in their ranks, including 307 private soldiers and the rest officers. Other sources mentions a loss of more than 1,000 killed and wounded Swedes in the battle, including Major General of the Cavalry Helmut Wrangel, three colonels, nine lieutenant colonels and Obristwachtmeister, and 24 Rittmeister, and the capture of 300 men and 13 standards. The Imperials reported a loss of 200 killed and wounded, including 2 lieutenant colonels and 4 Rittmeister. According to the Swedish Rikshistoriograf Pufendorf, they claimed losses of 200 killed and 100 wounded. Two officers were taken prisoner by the Swedish. Several officers, including Colonel Lanow and Lieutenant Colonel Count Bossu, were seriously wounded.

== Aftermath ==
Both sides claimed victory after the battle; the Imperial army was repulsed following initial success. In the days that followed, both armies held their positions. On 5 September 1647, the Imperial troops vacated their positions and moved north towards Tepl and in the direction of the Königswarter Pass. The Swedes took up the chase and another battle broke out at Tepl. Both armies holed up and faced each other for two weeks, ready to fight. After a failure of the Imperial troops, they broke away from the enemy and moved into the recently abandoned camp near Triebl. The Swedes turned north towards Kaaden.

== Sources ==
- Heber, Franz Alexander [in Czech] (1847). Böhmens Burgen, Festen und Bergschlösser: Fünfter Band (in German). Prague: C.W. Medau und Comp.
- Höfer, Ernst (1998). Das Ende des Dreißigjährigen Krieges. Strategie und Kriegsbild (in German). Köln/Weimar/Wien: Böhlau. ISBN 978-3-412-04297-4.
- Lahrkamp, Helmut (1962). Jan von Werth. Sein Leben nach archivalischen Quellenzeugnissen (in German). Köln: Der Löwe.
- Wilson, Peter (2009). Europe's Tragedy: A History of the Thirty Years War. Allen Lane. ISBN 978-0713995923.
- von Pufendorf, Samuel (1688). Die Schwedisch- und deutsche Kriegsgeschichte von König Gustav Adolfs Feldzuge in Deutschland an, biß zur Abdanckung der Königin Christina (in German). Frankfurt: Gleditsch. OCLC 634892503.
- Snoilsky, Carl (1894). Svenska Historiska Planscher: Årsberättelse för år 1893: Svenska Historiska Planscher 2. 1635-1666, Volume 2 (Kungl. Bibliotekets handlingar, Volume 16) (in Swedish). Stockholm: Norstedt. OCLC 700405016.
