= Peter Melander, Graf von Holzappel =

Commander during the Thirty Years' War

Peter Melander Graf von Holzappel
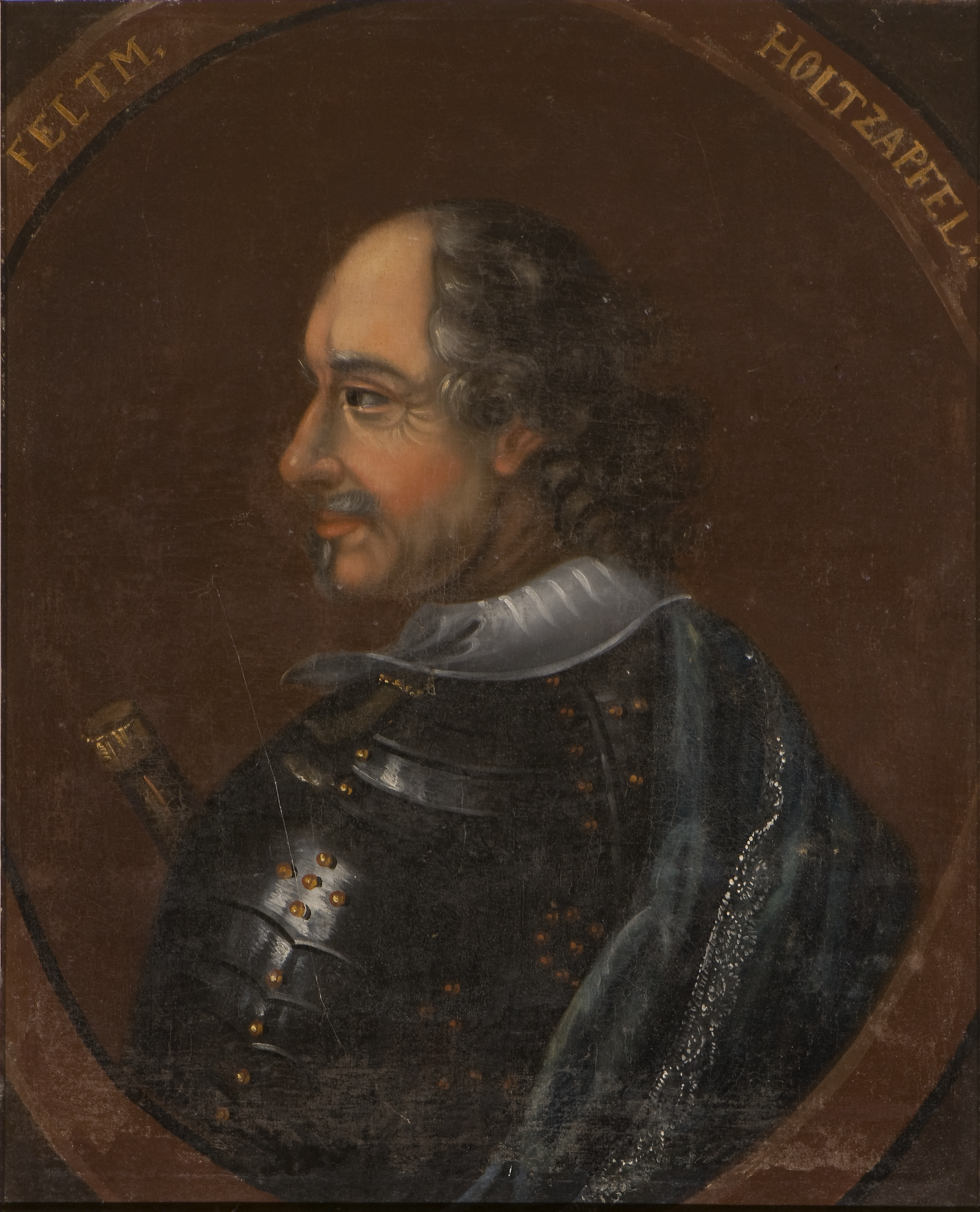
- Peter Melander von Holtzapel, currently at the Swedish Nationalmuseum
- Born: 8 February 1589; Niederhadamar, Holy Roman Empire
- Died: 17 May 1648 (aged 59) Augsburg, Electorate of Bavaria
- Allegiance: Dutch Republic; Republic of Venice; Landgraviate of Hesse-Kassel; Holy Roman Empire
- Rank: Generalfeldmarschall
- Conflicts: Thirty Years War: Battle of Oldendorf (1633); Siege of Eger (1647); Battle of Triebl (1647); Siege of Marburg (1647); Battle of Zusmarshausen (1648) †

Peter Melander, Count of Holzappel (8 February 1589 – 17 May 1648) was a German general who was a Protestant military leader in the Thirty Years' War until 1640 when he switched sides and even became Chief of the imperial army from 1647 until his death.

== Biography ==
=== Origins ===
Peter Melander was born, as Peter Eppelmann, in Niederhadamar, the son of a farmer. Documentary evidence of his birth date exists. The older literature says that he was born in 1585; this was based on an erroneous inscription in his epitaph in the church of Holzappel. After his father's death in 1592, Peter Eppelman joined his childless uncle Johann Eppelmann (d. 1608), a secretary of Maurice of Orange, in the Netherlands. His uncle had translated the family name Eppelmann into Greek as Melander, and Peter also took this name. Through the efforts of John Melander, the family was raised to knightly nobility in 1606. They then took over the name of Holzappel from the extinct noble Holzappel of Voitsburg-Selzberg family from the Giessen area.

=== Military career ===
The strictly Protestant Melander took his first tentative steps towards a military career in the Dutch army. In 1615, he joined the Venetian army and fought in the Uskok War. In 1620, he commanded a Swiss regiment in Basel as Colonel. He then fought in the Valtellina War (1620–1622) and the Mantuan War of Succession (1628–1631). He reached the first highlight of his military career in 1633 with his appointment as Lieutenant General and secret war council of the Landgrave William V of Hesse-Kassel. William V was allied with the Swedes, so Peter Melander fought with the Hessian troops against the imperial army. In the Battle of Oldendorf on 28 June 1633, he commanded the center of the Protestant forces under Duke George of Brunswick-Calenberg and contributed much to the victory over the Imperial army and defeated them several more times as he chased them through Westphalia. He captured Hamm on 26 May 1634 and he defeated General Bönnighausen on 27 June 1634, forcing him to retreat across the Rhine. Landgrave William V died in autumn 1637 and his widow, countess Amalie Elisabeth became regent for her eight-year-old son William VI. She held on to her late husband's anti-Habsburg policies. Melander was no longer willing to support this stance and resigned the command of the Hessian troops in mid-July 1640. He was then courted by the Emperor.

He briefly served as ambassador of Count Palatine Wolfgang William of Neuburg. On 23 December 1641, Melander was created imperial count of Holzappel. On 15 February 1642, he received an imperial patent promoting him to field marshal. After he left the Hessian army, he resided until 1643 at Angerort near Duisburg, on the instruction of Wolfgang William. On 1642, Wolfgang William enfeoffed him with Lülsdorf Castle near Niederkassel.

He did not resume his military duties until Wrangel invaded Westphalia in 1645. Melander was appointed as supreme commander of the imperial army in Westphalia to defend the region. On 30 November 1646, he occupied Paderborn and after the death of Matthias Gallas in April 1647, he took command of the entire imperial army and led it into Bohemia in July. He arrived too late to prevent the Swedish capture of Eger. In late August his cavalry scored a success against Swedish horsemen under Helmold Wilhelm Wrangel at the Battle of Triebl. In October he was joined by 10000 Bavarian troops under Count Jost of Gronsfeld. However, disputes between the two led to the armies being separated again by the end of November. Melander besieged Marburg and took the city, but not the castle, in December 1647. During this siege, he lost many troops. On 28 December 1647, Johann Georg Stauff, the Hessian commander of the castle, fired his cannon at the house of the apothecary Seip, where Melander had intended to have dinner at the bugle signal. Melander was severely injured by a falling beam; the sentinel at the door was killed.

=== Acquisition of dominion of Holzappel ===
Peter Melander became rich due to his position in the Thirty Years' War. In 1643, he purchased the Lordship of Esterau from John Louis of Nassau-Hadamar, who was in considerable financial difficulty. Emperor Ferdinand III raised the small Lordship to the immediate County of Holzappel. Melander became a member of the Wetterau Association of Imperial Counts in the Imperial Diet of the Holy Roman Empire.

=== Last battle and death ===
In January 1648, Melander's troops retreated towards the Danube. Near the village of Zusmarshausen, near Augsburg, they were surprised by a Swedish-French army under Wrangel and Turenne. Melander threw himself into the fray and was shot twice. He died on 17 May 1648 in Augsburg, as a result of the wounds he had received in this battle. He was buried in the princely crypt (the Melandergruft) in the Lutheran St. John church in Holzappel, which was known as Esten at the time.

Peter Melander left a fortune that allowed his widow Agnes to purchase the Lordship and Castle of Schaumburg in 1656, and merge it with Holzappel, thus forming the County of Holzappel-Schaumburg.

In 1685, Melander's daughter Elisabeth Charlotte changed the name of the county seat from Esten into Holzappel.

== Family ==
In 1638, Peter Melander married Baroness Agnes von Efferen-Hall (d. 1656), daughter of Johann Wilhelm von Efferen genannt Hall and his wife, Margarethe von der Baalen genannt Fleck. With her, he had his only child, a daughter named Charlotte Elisabeth, later Countess of Schaumburg-Holzappel. She married Prince Adolph, Prince of Nassau-Schaumburg and thereby became Elisabeth Charlotte, Princess of Nassau-Schaumburg.

Melander's descendants include King Willem-Alexander of the Netherlands and King Charles XVI of Sweden.

== Assessment ==
Melander, during his lifetime, was a highly respected warlord and almost all warring powers were vying for his services. He coined a saying, which is popular in Westerwald: "I am a German and, moreover, a Westerwalder, that is to say, two Germans". Modified versions of this saying are attributed to Maurice of Orange and Emperor Ferdinand III.

According to Andreas Pechtl, a bust of Melander of Holzappel in profile to the left, is included in the portrait gallery of Gripsholm Castle (inventory #798) and a photograph of another bust is included in the collection of the Deutsche Fotothek (inventory #df_0001833). Both portraits are probably authentic. A portrait in the Nassau collect, which has been reproduced in several articles about Melander, has been exposed by Pechtl as incorrect. It does not show Melander, but Prince Christian II of Anhalt-Bernburg.

== Sources ==
- Leopold von Eltester (1881). "Holzappel, Peter Graf zu" . Allgemeine Deutsche Biographie (in German). Vol. 13. Leipzig: Duncker & Humblot. pp. 21–25.
- Walter Rudersdorf (13 July 2002), The Thirty Years War and its aftermath – Episode 68, message Waldbrunner, p. 17
- Martin Brueck, in politics, "duodecimo" – origin and development of the Imperial County Holzappel-Schaumburg in the second half of the 17th Century, Staatsexamensarbeit, Department of Modern History, Eberhard Karls University of Tübingen, 2007
- Martin Brueck, "Politics in duodecimo," in: Annals of Nassau 121 (2010), p. 29-72.

Preceded by New creation	Count of Holzappel; 1643–1648	Succeeded by Elisabeth Charlotte
