= Elizabeth of Palatinate-Zweibrücken =

German princess

Elisabeth of Palatinate-Zweibrücken
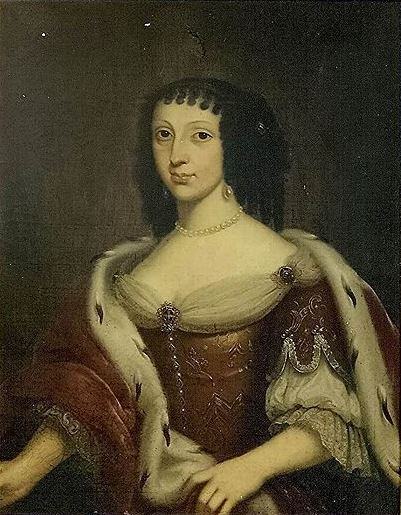

Princess Consort of Anhalt-Bernburg
- Reign: 16 October 1667 – 18 April 1677
- Born: 22 March 1642; Meisenheim, Palatine Zweibrücken, Holy Roman Empire
- Died: 18 April 1677 (aged 35); Ballenstedt, Anhalt, Holy Roman Empire
- Spouse: Victor Amadeus, Prince of Anhalt-Bernburg
- Issue: Karl Frederick, Prince of Anhalt-Bernburg; Lebrecht, Prince of Anhalt-Zeitz-Hoym
- House: Palatinate-Zweibrücken (by birth); Ascania (by marriage)
- Father: Frederick, Count Palatine of Zweibrücken
- Mother: Anna Juliane of Nassau-Saarbrücken

Elisabeth, Princess of Anhalt-Bernburg (née Countess Elisabeth of Palatinate-Zweibrücken; 22 March 1642 – 18 April 1677) was the consort of Victor Amadeus, Prince of Anhalt-Bernburg.

== Early life and ancestry ==
Countess Elisabeth of Palatinate-Zweibrücken was born in Meisenheim on 22 March 1642 to Frederick, Count Palatine of Zweibrücken and his wife, Countess Anna Juliane of Nassau-Saarbrücken (1617–1667). By birth, she was a member of the House of Palatinate-Zweibrücken, a cadet branch of an old Bavarian House of Wittelsbach.

== Marriage and issue ==
On 16 October 1667 she married Victor Amadeus, Prince of Anhalt-Bernburg in Meisenheim, becoming the Princess Consort of Anhalt-Bernburg.

They had six children:

1. Karl Frederick, Prince of Anhalt-Bernburg (b. Bernburg, 13 July 1668 - d. Ballenstedt, 22 April 1721).
2. Lebrecht, Prince of Anhalt-Zeitz-Hoym, later Anhalt-Bernburg-Schaumburg-Hoym (b. Bernburg, 28 June 1669 - d. Bad Ems, 17 May 1727).
3. Princess Sophie Juliane of Anhalt-Bernburg (b. Bernburg, 26 October 1672 - d. Bernburg, 21 August 1674).
4. Prince John George of Anhalt-Bernburg (b. Bernburg, 14 February 1674 - killed in battle at Leuze, 9 September 1691).
5. Prince Christian of Anhalt-Bernburg (b. Bernburg, 15 March 1675 - d. Bernburg, 30 December 1675).
6. A son (b and d. Bernburg, 18 April 1677).

== Death ==
Princess Elisabeth died during the birth of her sixth child, whom also died during the birth on 18 April 1677 in Ballenstedt, Anhalt, Holy Roman Empire. Prince Victor Amadeus outlived her for the next forty-one years and remained a widower.

Elisabeth is buried, alongside her husband, in the Anhalt family crypt of the Castle Church of St. Aegidien, Bernburg, Saxony-Anhalt, Germany.
