= Adolph, Prince of Nassau-Schaumburg =

German nobleman

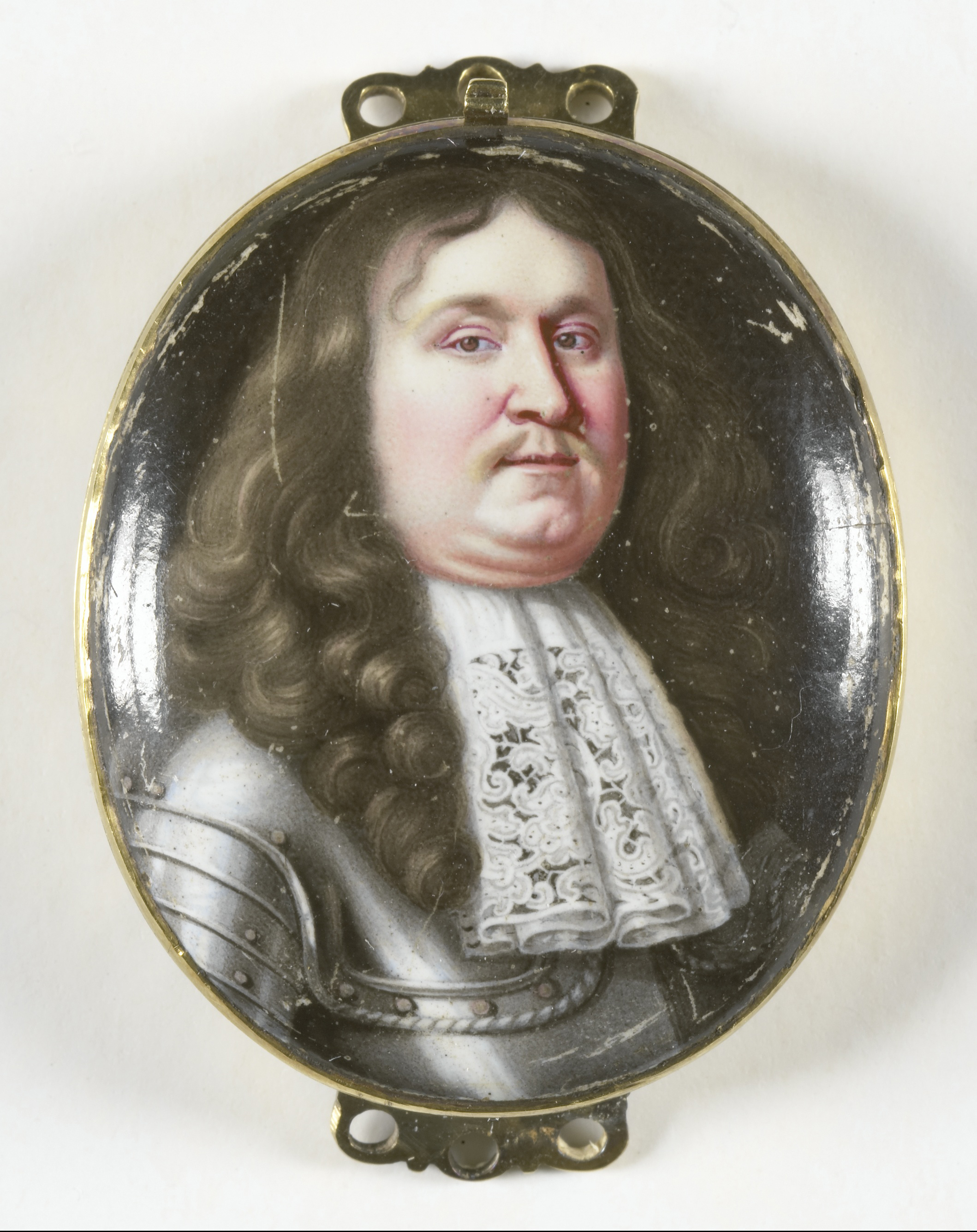
- Born: 23 January 1629
- Died: 19 December 1676 (aged 47)
- Noble family: House of Nassau
- Spouse: Elisabeth Charlotte, Countess of Holzappel
- Father: Louis Henry, Prince of Nassau-Dillenburg
- Mother: Catherine of Sayn-Wittgenstein

Adolph, Prince of Nassau-Schaumburg (also known as Adolph of Nassau-Dillenburg; 23 January 1629 – 19 December 1676) was the founder of the short-lived Nassau-Schaumburg line.

He was the son of Louis Henry (1594–1662), Count of Nassau-Dillenburg, from 1654 Prince of Nassau-Dillenburg, and his first wife Catherine of Sayn-Wittgenstein (1588–1651). As a younger son he received only the district of Driedorf from his father's inheritance.

In 1653, he married Elisabeth Charlotte (1640–1707), the daughter of Peter Melander, Count of Holzappel. Via her, he inherited the County of Holzappel and the Lordship of Schaumburg. He then styled himself Count of Nassau-Schaumburg and became the founder of the Nassau-Schaumburg line. However, all his sons predeceased him, and when he died in 1676, Holzappel and Schaumburg fell to his son-in-law Lebrecht, Prince of Anhalt-Zeitz-Hoym, the founder of the Anhalt-Bernburg-Schaumburg-Hoym line.

Adolph and Elisabeth Charlotte had the following children:

- Catherine (b. 1659)
- Agnes (b. 1660)
- William Louis (b. 1661)
- Ernestine Charlotte (1662–1732), married:
  1. in 1678 William Maurice of Nassau-Siegen (1649–1691)
  2. Frederick Philip of Geuder-Rabensteiner (d. 13 May 1727), Councillor and Hofmeister at the court in Bernburg
- Joan Elisabeth (1663 – 9 February 1700), married in 1692 to Count Frederick Adolph of Lippe-Detmold
- Louise Henriette (1665-1665)
- Charles Henry (b. 1670)
- Charlotte (1673–1700), married in 1692 to Lebrecht, Prince of Anhalt-Zeitz-Hoym
