= Storming of Varna =

Storming of Varna (1773)
- Part of the Russo-Turkish War (1768–1774)
Date	30 October 1773
Location	Varna, Ottoman Empire (Now in Bulgaria)
Result	Ottoman victory
Territorial changes	Russian forces repulsed from Varna

Belligerents
Ottoman Empire	Russian Empire

Commanders and leaders
(Ottoman Empire) Arnaut Pasha	Karl Karlovich von Ungern-Sternberg; Nikolai Ivanovich Chorba; Victor Amadeus of Anhalt-Bernburg-Schaumburg-Hoym; V. V. Reiser

Strength
3,000	4,000

Casualties and losses
Unknown	211 killed many wounded 6 cannons

The Storming of Varna (Note: Turkish: Varna'nın Basılması; Russian: Штурм Варны) was a military storm undertaken by the Russians October 30, 1773 against the city of Varna. The storm was part of the Russo-Turkish War (1768–1774), and resulted in an Ottoman victory.

== Background ==
In October 1773, Field Marshal Pyotr Rumyantsev resumed the offensive beyond the Danube. On October 16, the detachment of Lieutenant General Yuri Vladimirovich Dolgorukov (5,000 men) crossed at Hârșova and joined up with the detachment of Lieutenant General Karl Karlovich von Ungern-Sternberg (4,000 men) at Babadag. The next day, they attacked the 15,000 strong army under the command of Dagestanly Pasha at Karasu and defeated it. On October 23, both detachments occupied the stronghold in Dobrich almost without a fight. Then they were ordered to continue the offensive. Dolgoruky on Shumen. Ungern on Varna.

At the end of October, Ungern approached Varna, which was defended by a 3,000 strong garrison. Varna was surrounded by a high stone wall with towers; many trenches were dug in front of the ditch. The garrison was reinforced by the crews of warships stationed in the harbor. Trusting in the courage of his soldiers, Ungern decided to storm the fortress.

== Storming ==
On October 30, at four o’clock in the morning, the Russian troops advanced toward the city; the infantry moved in three squares, with the main one, commanded by Ungern himself, in the center, and the smaller ones, led by Generals V. V. Reiser and Prince of Bernburg, on the flanks. The cavalry, under the command of Major General Nikolai Ivanovich Chorbaru, moved in the intervals between the squares. Upon approaching within 350 sazhen (about 750 meters) of the fortress, Ungern opened a cannonade, which had no successful effect. He then ordered an assault; the troops advanced to the very counterscarp but were unable to descend into the ditch, lacking ladders and fascines. Moreover, the ditch proved to be deep and marshy. The troops remained for several hours at the closest possible distance from the fortress, under deadly enemy fire. At last, realizing the futility of his efforts, Ungern ordered the troops to retreat. Six cannons, stuck in the mud, fell into the hands of the enemy. Russian losses 211 officers and soldiers were killed and a larger number wounded.

== Aftermath ==
Then General Ungern, paying no attention to Prince Dolgoruky’s detachment, left him against the main army of the Turkish forces and led his troops along the coastal road to Balchik, Kavarna and Mangalia, to Izmail, where he arrived on November 23.

After this failure, Dolgorukov stopped moving towards Shumen and retreated to Dobrich. Ungern and Saltykov reported to Field Marshal Rumyantsev that due to the rains and snow, the flooding of bridges and roads, the shortage of fodder, and illness among their troops, a new campaign against Shumen was difficult. Then Rumyantsev ordered the army to withdraw to the left bank of the Danube for winter quarters.
