= Holzappel =

- Municipality
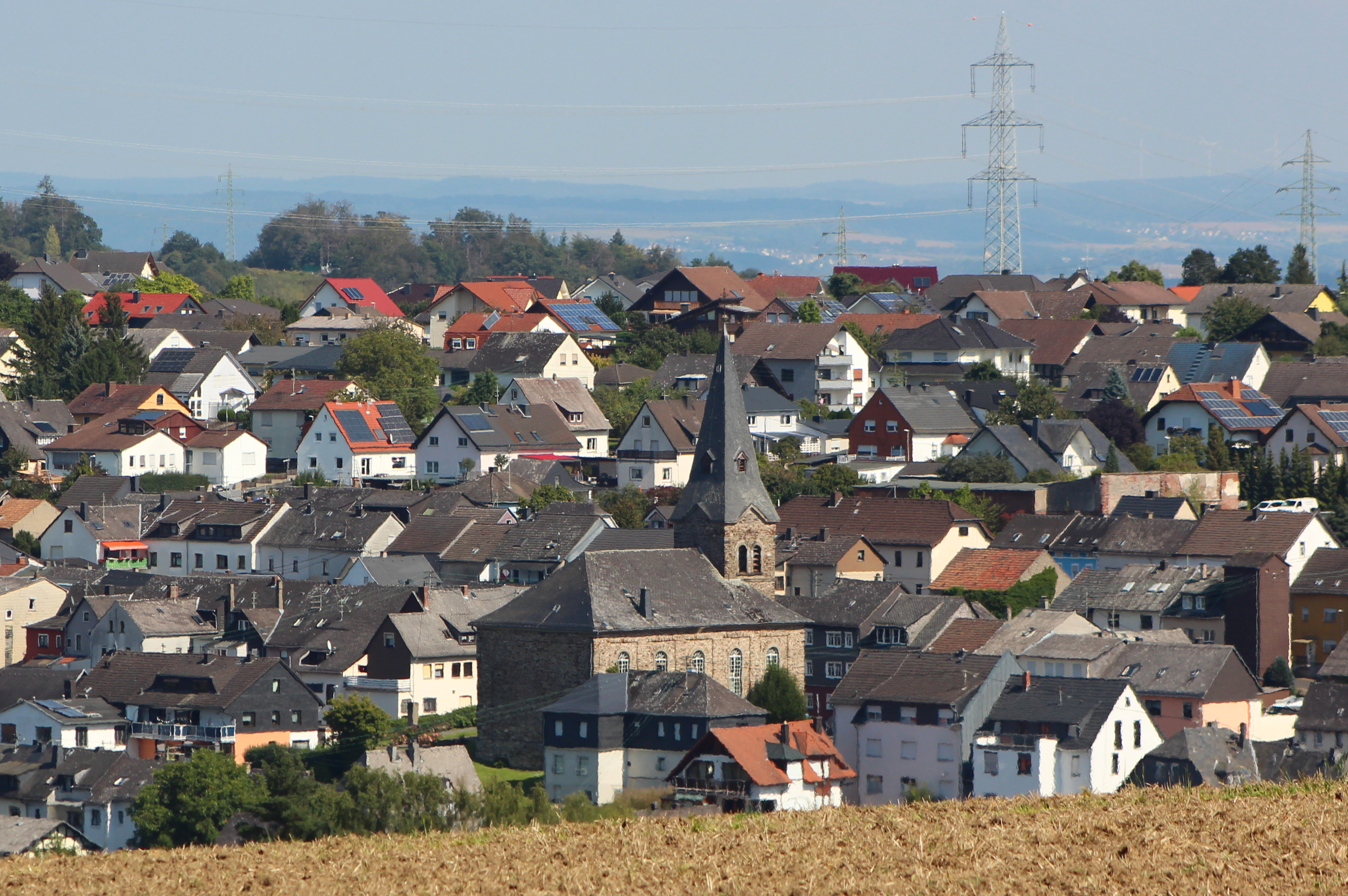

- Coat of arms

- Location of Holzappel within Rhein-Lahn-Kreis district
- Interactive map of Holzappel
- Location within Germany Location within Rhineland-Palatinate
- Coordinates: 50°21′4.48″N 7°53′52.80″E
- Country: Germany
- State: Rhineland-Palatinate
- District: Rhein-Lahn-Kreis
- Municipal assoc.: Diez

Government
  - Mayor (2019–24): Harald Nöllge

Area
  - Total: 2.73 km^{2} (1.05 sq mi)
- Elevation: 297 m (974 ft)

Population (2025-12-31)
  - Total: 1,079
  - Density: 395/km^{2} (1,020/sq mi)
- Time zone: UTC+01:00 (CET)
  - Summer (DST): UTC+02:00 (CEST)
- Postal codes: 56379
- Dialling codes: 06439
- Vehicle registration: EMS, DIZ, GOH
- Website: www.holzappel-herthasee.de

Holzappel is a municipality in Rhein-Lahn-Kreis, Rhineland-Palatinate, Germany, with a population in 2006 of 1100. It belongs to the association community of Diez.

Holzappel was a county and state of the Holy Roman Empire from 1643 until 1714. It was founded by Peter Melander, an imperial field marshal during the Thirty Years' War. In 1714, it was inherited by Anhalt-Bernburg.

== See also ==
- County of Holzappel
