= Balduinstein =

- Municipality
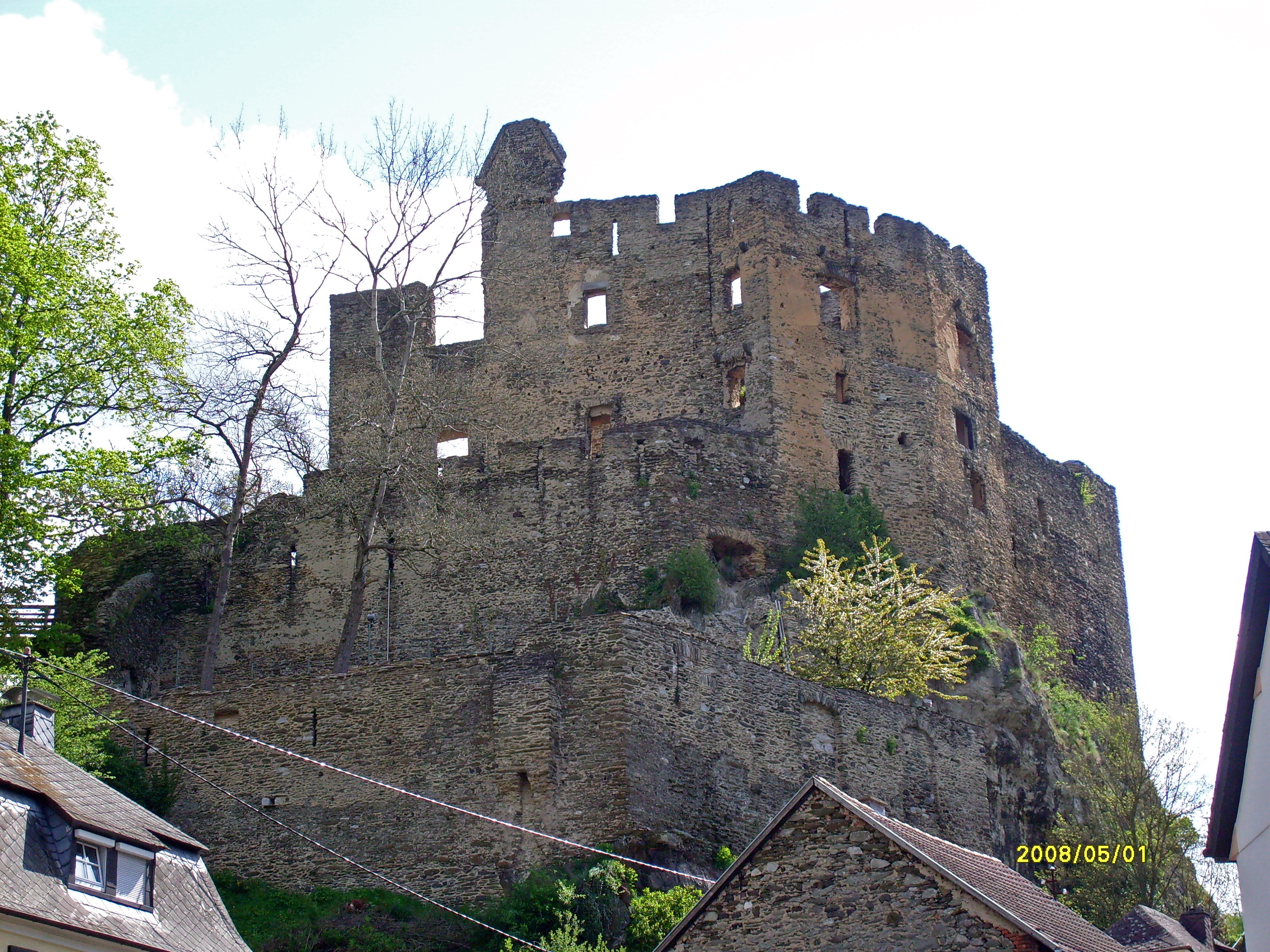
- Ruins of the castle

- Flag Coat of arms

- Location of Balduinstein within Rhein-Lahn-Kreis district
- Interactive map of Balduinstein
- Location within Germany Location within Rhineland-Palatinate
- Coordinates: 50°20′39.95″N 7°58′15.3″E
- Country: Germany
- State: Rhineland-Palatinate
- District: Rhein-Lahn-Kreis
- Municipal assoc.: Diez
- Subdivisions: 2

Government
  - Mayor (2019–24): Maria-Theresia Schmidt

Area
  - Total: 5.17 km^{2} (2.00 sq mi)
- Elevation: 160 m (520 ft)

Population (2025-12-31)
  - Total: 564
  - Density: 109/km^{2} (283/sq mi)
- Time zone: UTC+01:00 (CET)
  - Summer (DST): UTC+02:00 (CEST)
- Postal codes: 65558
- Dialling codes: 06432
- Vehicle registration: EMS, DIZ, GOH
- Website: www.gemeinde-balduinstein.de

Balduinstein (German pronunciation: [ˈbalduiːnʃtaɪn]) is a municipality in the district of Rhein-Lahn, in Rhineland-Palatinate, in western Germany. It belongs to the association community of Diez.

== Transport ==
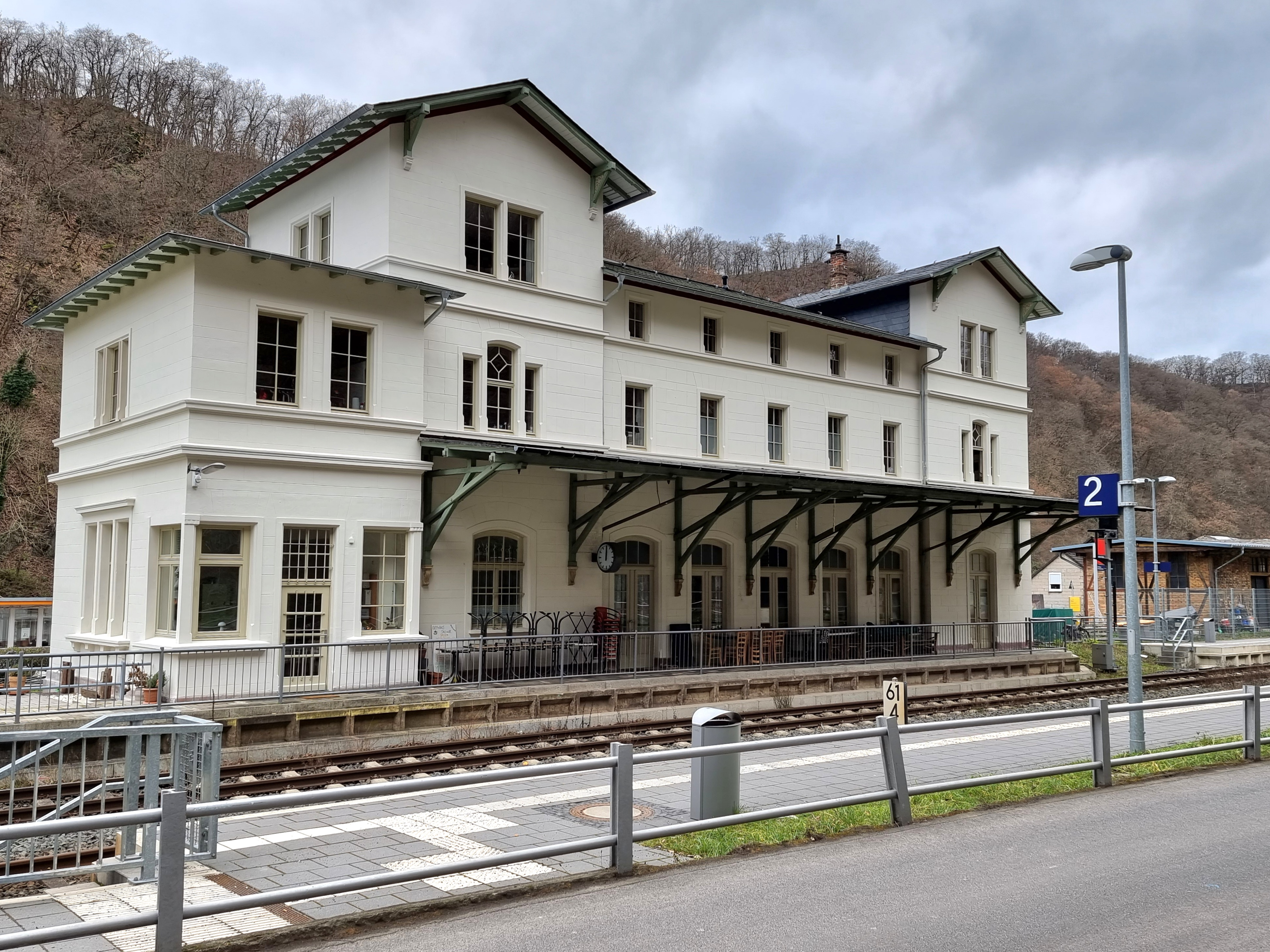
Balduinstein station

There's a train station of Lahn Valley Railway in Balduinstein, serviced by local.train line number RB23 of section Lahn-Eifel-Bahn of Deutsche Bahn.
