= Charlottenberg, Germany =

Charlottenberg
- Municipality
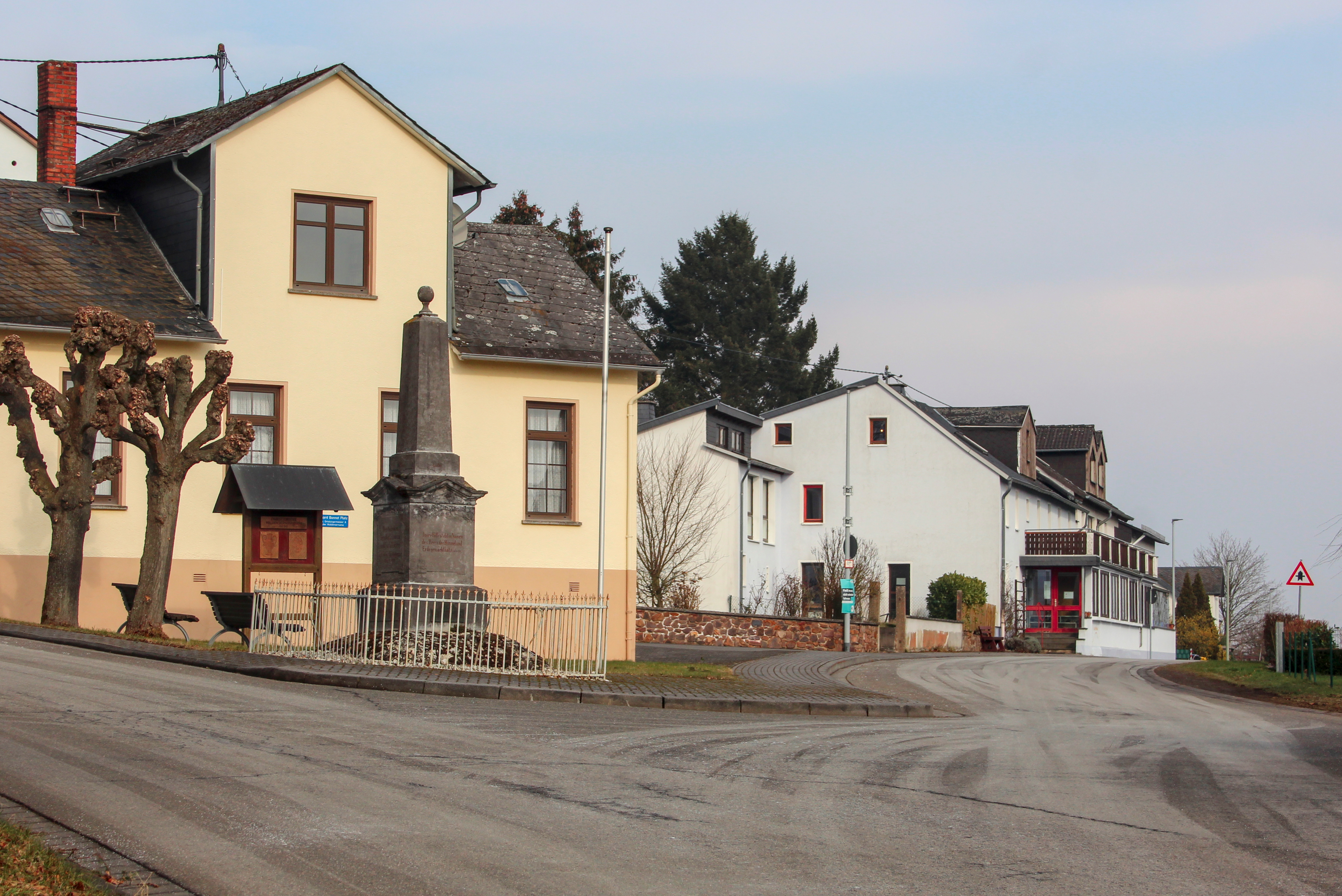

- Coat of arms

- Location of Charlottenberg within Rhein-Lahn-Kreis district
- Interactive map of Charlottenberg
- Location within Germany Location within Rhineland-Palatinate
- Coordinates: 50°20′37.48″N 7°52′48.29″E
- Country: Germany
- State: Rhineland-Palatinate
- District: Rhein-Lahn-Kreis
- Municipal assoc.: Diez

Government
  - Mayor (2019–24): Marco Vogt

Area
  - Total: 0.76 km^{2} (0.29 sq mi)
- Elevation: 340 m (1,120 ft)

Population (2025-12-31)
  - Total: 144
  - Density: 190/km^{2} (490/sq mi)
- Time zone: UTC+01:00 (CET)
  - Summer (DST): UTC+02:00 (CEST)
- Postal codes: 56379
- Dialling codes: 06439
- Vehicle registration: EMS, DIZ, GOH
- Website: Verbandsgemeinde Diez

Charlottenberg is a municipality in the district of Rhein-Lahn, in Rhineland-Palatinate, in western Germany. It belongs to the association community of Diez.
