= Anhalt-Bernburg-Schaumburg-Hoym =

Principality of Anhalt-Bernburg-Schaumburg-Hoym
- 1718–1812
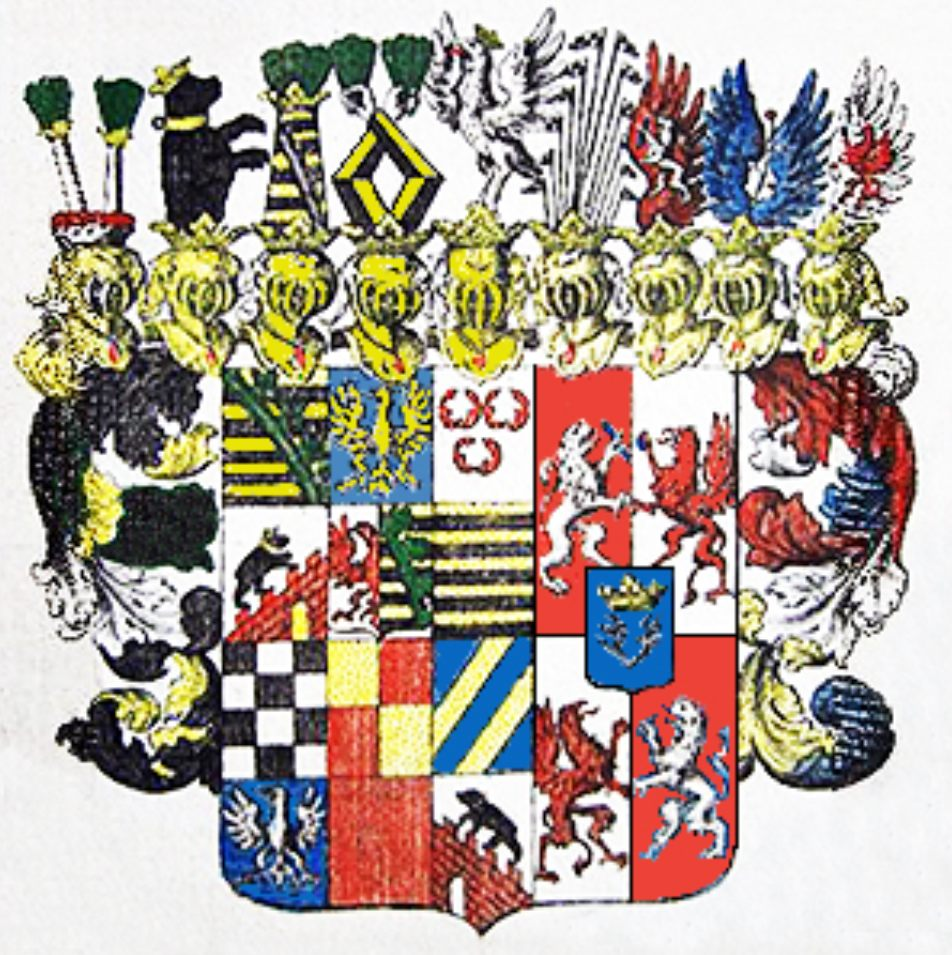
- Coat of arms
- Status: Principality
- Capital: Hoym
- History
  - Partition of Anhalt-Bernburg (as Anhalt-Zeitz-Hoym): 1718
  - Became Anhalt-Bernburg-Schaumburg-Hoym: 1727
  - Disestablished: 24 December 1812
Preceded by	Succeeded by
Anhalt-Bernburg	Anhalt-Bernburg

Coat of arms of Anhalt-Bernburg-Harzgerode

Anhalt-Bernburg-Schaumburg-Hoym (originally Anhalt-Zeitz-Hoym) was a German principality and state of the Holy Roman Empire. The death of Prince Victor Amadeus of Anhalt-Bernburg in 1718 resulted in the partition of his land, with his second son Prince Lebrecht inheriting what was originally known as Anhalt-Zeitz-Hoym.

The name of this principality was changed in 1727 from Anhalt-Zeitz-Hoym to Anhalt-Bernburg-Schaumburg-Hoym. The death of Prince Frederick on 24 December 1812 resulted in the extinction of the ruling house, and the territory was inherited by the Princes of Anhalt-Bernburg.

== Princes of Anhalt-Zeitz-Hoym (1718–1727) ==
- Lebrecht 1718–1727
- Victor I Amadeus Adolph 1727

Principality changed its name to Anhalt-Bernburg-Schaumburg-Hoym

== Princes of Anhalt-Bernburg-Schaumburg-Hoym (1727–1812) ==
- Victor I Amadeus Adolph 1727–1772
- Karl Louis 1772–1806
- Victor II Karl Frederick 1806–1812
- Frederick 1812

To Anhalt-Bernburg
