= Victor Amadeus, Prince of Anhalt-Bernburg =

Victor Amadeus
- Prince of Anhalt-Bernburg
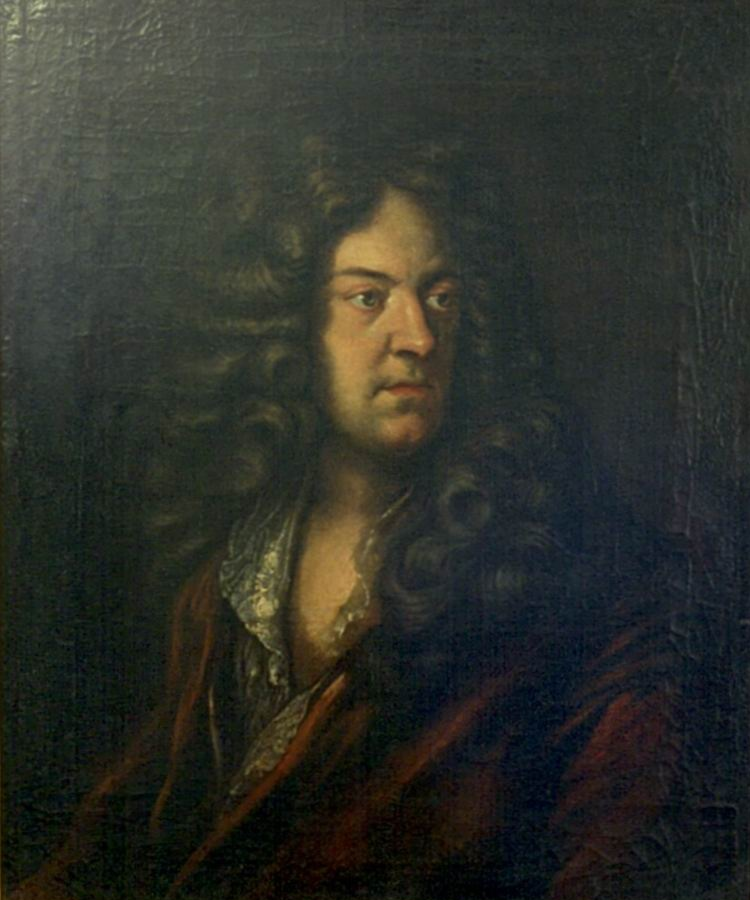
- Portrait by Ádám Mányoki

Prince of Anhalt-Bernburg
- Reign: 22 September 1656 – 14 February 1718
- Predecessor: Christian II
- Successor: Karl Frederick
- Born: 6 October 1634; Harzgerode, Anhalt-Bernburg
- Died: 14 February 1718 (aged 83); Bernburg, Anhalt-Bernburg
- Spouse: Elizabeth of Palatinate-Zweibrücken
- Issue: Karl Frederick, Prince of Anhalt-Bernburg; Lebrecht, Prince of Anhalt-Zeitz-Hoym; Princess Sophie Juliane; Prince John George; Prince Christian
- House: Ascania
- Father: Christian II, Prince of Anhalt-Bernburg
- Mother: Eleonore Sophie of Schleswig-Holstein-Sonderburg

Victor Amadeus of Anhalt-Bernburg (6 October 1634 in Harzgerode – 14 February 1718 in Bernburg), was a German prince of the House of Ascania and ruler of the principality of Anhalt-Bernburg.

He was the sixth (but second surviving) son of Christian II, Prince of Anhalt-Bernburg, by his wife Eleonore Sophie, daughter of John the Younger, Duke of Schleswig-Holstein-Sonderburg.

== Life ==
The death of his older brother, the Hereditary Prince Erdmann Gideon (4 April 1649), made Victor Amadeus the new heir of his father, whom he succeeded seven years later, in 1656. Four years after that, the death of his younger and only surviving brother Karl Ursinus left him as the only living agnate of the main line of Anhalt-Bernburg; the next heirs, until the birth of his children, were his uncle Frederick, Prince of Anhalt-Harzgerode, and his only son William Louis. In 1665, upon the death without heirs of William Louis, Prince of Anhalt-Köthen, the territories and title of the latter were taken over by his cousins Emmanuel and Lebrecht, the co-rulers of Anhalt-Plötzkau, whose territories were returned to Anhalt-Bernburg (from which they had originally been extracted) under Victor Amadeus. In 1709, he inherited the territories of the principality of Anhalt-Harzgerode upon the death of William Louis, who had been its ruler.

== Marriage and issue ==
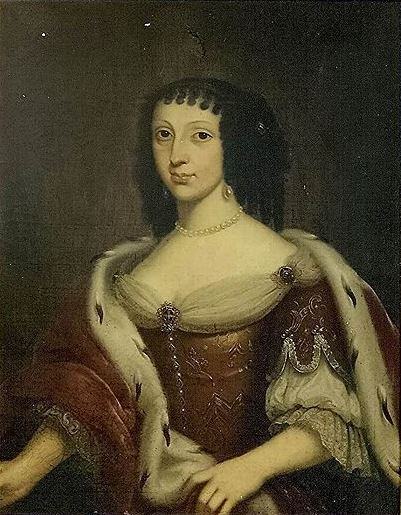
Wife of Prince Victor Amadeus of Anhalt-Bernburg: Countess palatine Elizabeth of Palatinate-Zweibrücken

In Meisenheim am Glan on 16 October 1667 Victor Amadeus married Elisabeth (b. Meisenheim, 22 March 1642 - d. Bernburg, 18 April 1677), eldest daughter of Frederick, Count Palatine of Zweibrücken by his wife, Countess Anna Juliane of Nassau-Saarbrücken (1617–1667).

They had six children:

1. Karl Frederick, Prince of Anhalt-Bernburg (b. Bernburg, 13 July 1668 - d. Ballenstedt, 22 April 1721).
2. Lebrecht, Prince of Anhalt-Zeitz-Hoym, later Anhalt-Bernburg-Schaumburg-Hoym (b. Bernburg, 28 June 1669 - d. Bad Ems, 17 May 1727).
3. Sophie Juliane (b. Bernburg, 26 October 1672 - d. Bernburg, 21 August 1674).
4. John George (b. Bernburg, 14 February 1674 - killed in battle at Leuze, 9 September 1691).
5. Christian (b. Bernburg, 15 March 1675 - d. Bernburg, 30 December 1675).
6. A son (b and d. Bernburg, 18 April 1677).

== Death ==
After the death of his wife during her sixth childbirth, Victor Amadeus remained a widower for the next forty-one years, until his death on 14 February 1718, in Bernburg. He was buried, alongside his wife, in The Castle Church of Saint Giles in Bernburg, Saxony-Anhalt, Germany.

Preceded by Christian II	Prince of Anhalt-Bernburg; 1656 – 1718	Succeeded by Karl Frederick
