= Schaumburg Castle, Rhineland-Palatinate =

Castle in Rhineland-Palatinate, Germany

Coordinates: 50°20′22″N 7°58′38″E

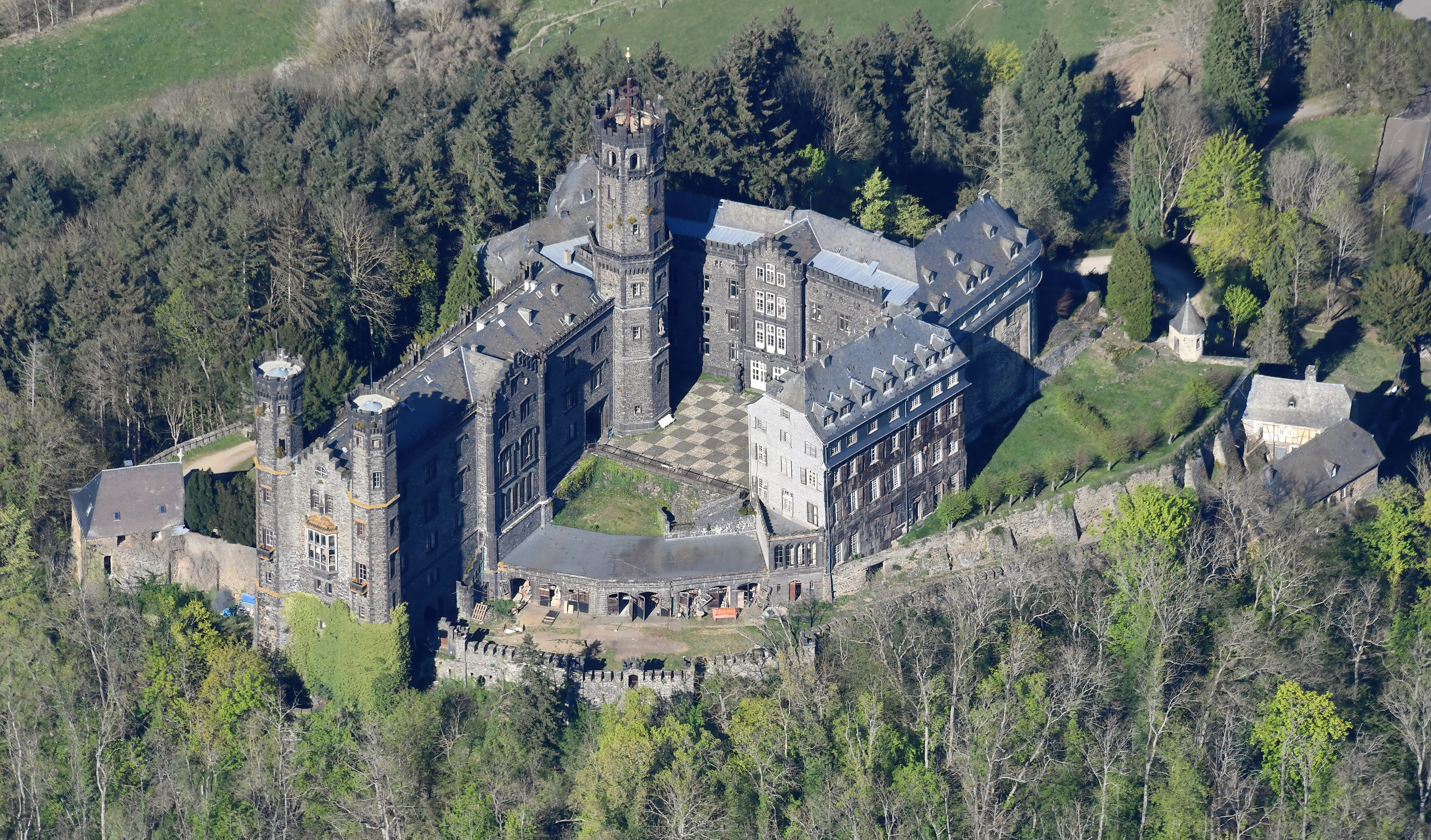
Aerial view of the Schaumburg Castle

Schaumburg Castle (German: Schloss Schaumburg) is a schloss in Rhineland-Palatinate, Germany, south of Balduinstein near Limburg an der Lahn.

It was owned by the former ruling family of Waldeck and Pyrmont, and it served as the retirement residence of SS General Josias, Hereditary Prince of Waldeck and Pyrmont. It is now owned by a Turkish investment group.

== Lordship of Schaumburg ==
The territory of the Lordship of Schaumburg consisted of Biebrich, Cramberg and Steinsberg.
