= Alexander, Prince of Lippe =

Prince of Lippe from 1895 to 1905

Alexander
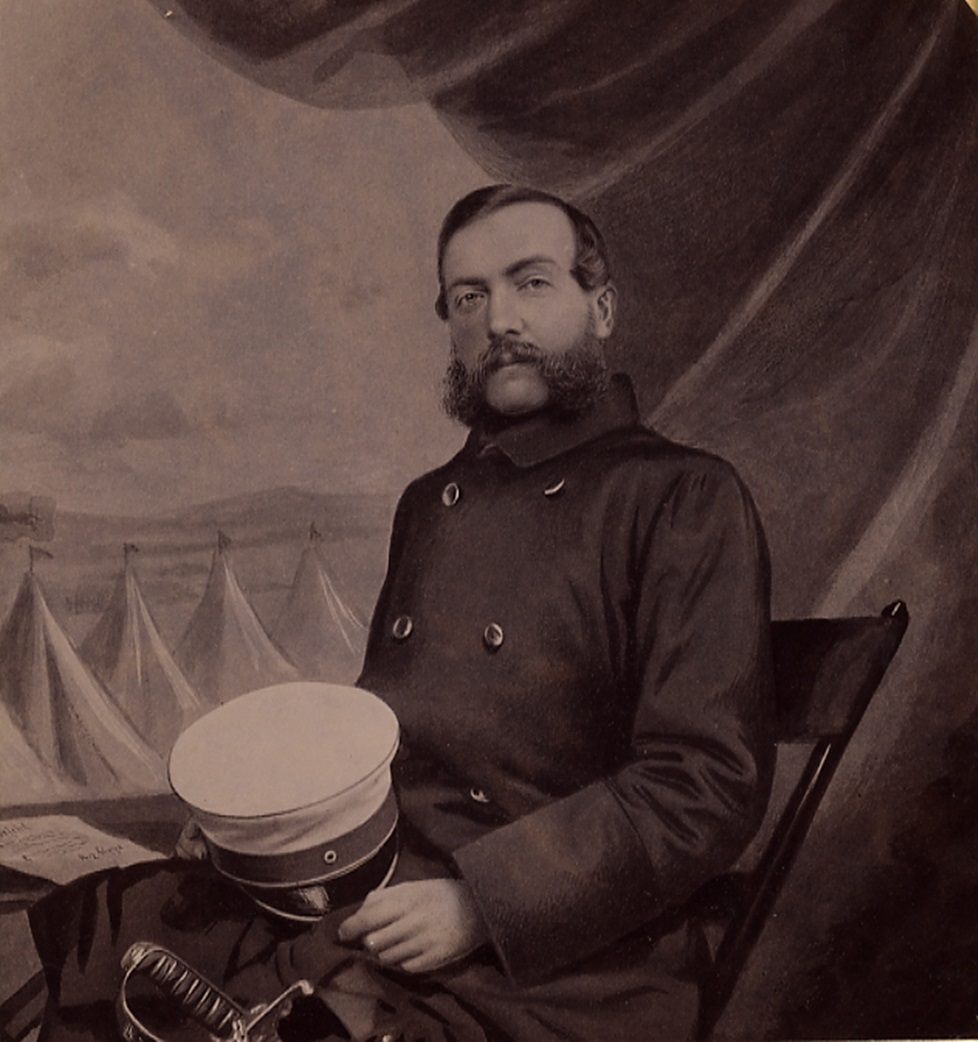
- Prince Alexander as a captain in the Hanoverian Army

Prince of Lippe
- Reign: 20 March 1895 – 13 January 1905
- Predecessor: Woldemar
- Successor: Leopold IV
- Born: 16 January 1831; Detmold
- Died: 13 January 1905 (aged 73); St Gilgenberg
- House: Lippe
- Father: Leopold II
- Mother: Princess Emilie of Schwarzburg-Sondershausen

Alexander, Prince of Lippe (German: Karl Alexander zur Lippe) (16 January 1831 – 13 January 1905) was the penultimate sovereign of the Principality of Lippe. Succeeding to the throne in 1895, Alexander had his power exercised by a regent throughout his reign on account of his mental illness.

== Early life and ascension ==
Prince Alexander of Lippe was born in Detmold the seventh child of Leopold II, Lippe's reigning prince and Leopold's consort Princess Emilie of Schwarzburg-Sondershausen (1800–1867). Prince Alexander for a time served as a captain in the Hanoverian Army.

Alexander succeeded as Prince of Lippe on 20 March 1895 following the death of his brother Prince Woldemar. As Alexander had been showing signs of a mental illness and had been placed under legal restrictions in 1870 and in 1893, it was necessary for a regency to be established in Lippe. Alexander was the last male of the Lippe-Detmold line, the next senior line of the House of Lippe were the Counts of Lippe-Biesterfeld followed by the Counts of Lippe-Weissenfeld and then the most junior line the Princes of Schaumburg-Lippe.

== Regency dispute ==
Prince Adolf of Schaumburg-Lippe, the brother-in-law of the German Emperor Wilhelm II, immediately claimed the position of regent on Alexander's ascension, basing the claim on a decree that had been issued by Prince Woldemar in 1890, but kept secret until Woldemar's death. This act was disputed by Count Ernst of Lippe-Biesterfeld who also put forward a claim to the regency. Lippe's diet confirmed Prince Adolf as regent on 24 April 1895, pending a settlement over the disputed regency.

A settlement was reached in 1897 when a commission under the presidency of King Albert of Saxony ruled in favour of the claims of Count Ernst of Lippe-Biesterfeld. Prince Adolf then resigned the regency and was replaced by Count Ernst, who would rule until his death in 1904 as regent for Alexander. Ernst's son Count Leopold of Lippe-Biesterfeld succeeded as regent.

== Life as prince ==
While unable to exercise power Alexander lived at the sanatorium of St Gilgenberg near Bayreuth, where he would often be seen attending concerts and the theatre. He also passed time by playing chess, copying pictures from newspapers and listening to music. He was also aware of his position as a sovereign prince and would insist on royal etiquette being observed.

Alexander's death at St Gilgenberg brought about the extinction of the Lippe-Detmold line. Count Leopold of the Lippe-Biesterfeld line succeeded him as Prince of Lippe.

== Ancestry ==
Ancestors of Alexander, Prince of Lippe

16. Simon Henry Adolph, Count of Lippe-Detmold
8. Simon August, Count of Lippe-Detmold
17. Princess Johanna Wilhelmina of Nassau-Idstein
4. Leopold I, Prince of Lippe
18. Leopold II, Prince of Anhalt-Dessau
9. Princess Maria Leopoldine of Anhalt-Dessau
19. Princess Gisela Agnes of Anhalt-Köthen
2. Leopold II, Prince of Lippe
20. Victor Frederick, Prince of Anhalt-Bernburg
10. Frederick Albert, Prince of Anhalt-Bernburg
21. Albertine of Brandenburg-Schwedt
5. Princess Pauline of Anhalt-Bernburg
22. Frederick Charles, Duke of Schleswig-Holstein-Sonderburg-Plön
11. Princess Luise of Schleswig-Holstein-Sonderburg-Plön
23. Countess Christiane Irmgard of Reventlow
1. Alexander, Prince of Lippe
24. Prince August of Schwarzburg-Sondershausen
12. Christian Günther III, Prince of Schwarzburg-Sondershausen
25. Princess Charlotte Sophie of Anhalt-Bernburg
6. Günther Frederick Charles I, Prince of Schwarzburg-Sondershausen
26. Victor Frederick, Prince of Anhalt-Bernburg (= 20)
13. Princess Charlotte Wilhelmine of Anhalt-Bernburg
27. Albertine of Brandenburg-Schwedt (= 21)
3. Princess Emilie of Schwarzburg-Sondershausen
28. Louis Günther II, Prince of Schwarzburg-Rudolstadt
14. Frederick Charles, Prince of Schwarzburg-Rudolstadt
29. Countess Sophie Henriette Reuss of Untergreiz
7. Princess Karoline of Schwarzburg-Rudolstadt
30. John Frederick, Prince of Schwarzburg-Rudolstadt
15. Princess Friederike of Schwarzburg-Rudolstadt
31. Princess Bernardina Christina Sophia of Saxe-Weimar-Eisenach

Alexander, Prince of Lippe House of Lippe Born: 16 January 1831 Died: 13 January 1905
Regnal titles
Preceded by Woldemar	Prince of Lippe; 1895–1905	Succeeded by Leopold IV
