= Leopold III of Lippe =

Leopold III
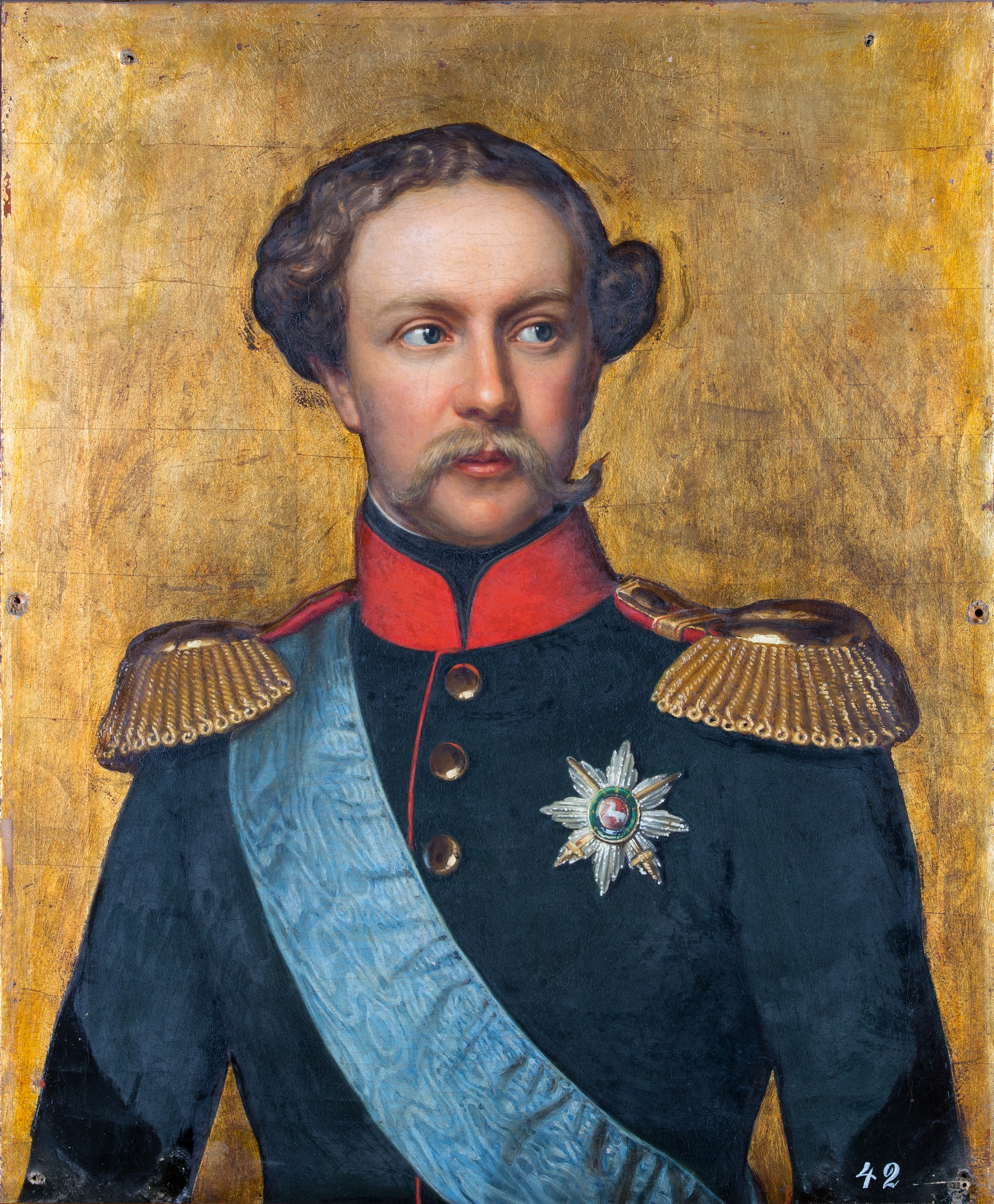

Prince of Lippe
- Reign: 1 January 1851 – 8 December 1875
- Predecessor: Leopold II
- Successor: Woldemar
- Born: 1 September 1821; Detmold
- Died: 8 December 1875 (aged 54); Detmold
- Spouse: Princess Elisabeth of Schwarzburg-Rudolstadt (m. 1852)
- House: Lippe
- Father: Leopold II, Prince of Lippe
- Mother: Princess Emilie of Schwarzburg-Sondershausen

Leopold III of Lippe (Paul Friedrich Emil Leopold; 1 September 1821 – 8 December 1875) was the sovereign of the Principality of Lippe reigning from 1851 until his death.

== Early life and ascension ==
Leopold III was born in Detmold the eldest child of Leopold II, the reigning prince of Lippe and his consort Princess Emilie of Schwarzburg-Sondershausen. Being the heir apparent to the throne from birth he had the title Hereditary Prince.

He succeeded as Prince of Lippe on 1 January 1851 following the death of his father. A year after succeeding to the throne, Leopold was married on 17 April 1852 in Rudolstadt to Princess Elisabeth of Schwarzburg-Rudolstadt, the daughter of Prince Albert of Schwarzburg-Rudolstadt and Princess Augusta of Solms-Braunfels.

== Reign ==
In 1854, Leopold issued two sovereign edicts. The first on 9 March, placed the Catholic Church on an equal footing with the Calvinist State Church of Lippe. The second six days later on 15 March, was to grant the same status to the Lutherans.

Lippe went through various changes during his reign. At his ascension, the principality was a member of the German Confederation, and Leopold supported Prussia during the Austro-Prussian War of 1866. Following the war and the dissolution of the German Confederation, Lippe joined the North German Confederation on its creation in 1867. Lippe would then remain a member of the North German Confederation until the creation of the German Empire in 1871 following the Franco-Prussian War.

Prince Leopold was one of the main promoters of the creation of the Hermann monument in the Teutoburg Forest which was opened by the German Emperor William I in the summer of 1875. A few months after the unveiling of the monument, Leopold died in Detmold. As Leopold was childless, his brother Woldemar succeeded him as Prince of Lippe.

The composer Johannes Brahms was a member of the prince's household between 1857 and 1859 as a conductor and music teacher to his sister Princess Friederike.

== Ancestry ==
Ancestors of Leopold III of Lippe

16. Simon Henry Adolph, Count of Lippe-Detmold
8. Simon August, Count of Lippe-Detmold
17. Princess Johannette Wilhelmine of Nassau-Idstein
4. Leopold I, Prince of Lippe
18. Leopold II, Prince of Anhalt-Dessau
9. Princess Maria Leopoldine of Anhalt-Dessau
19. Princess Gisela Agnes of Anhalt-Köthen
2. Leopold II, Prince of Lippe
20. Victor Frederick, Prince of Anhalt-Bernburg
10. Frederick Albert, Prince of Anhalt-Bernburg
21. Margravine Albertine of Brandenburg-Schwedt
5. Princess Pauline of Anhalt-Bernburg
22. Friedrich Carl, Duke of Schleswig-Holstein-Sonderburg-Plön
11. Princess Luise of Schleswig-Holstein-Sonderburg-Plön
23. Countess Christiane Irmgard of Reventlow
1. Leopold III, Prince of Lippe
24. Prince August of Schwarzburg-Sondershausen
12. Christian Günther III, Prince of Schwarzburg-Sondershausen
25. Princess Charlotte Sophie of Anhalt-Bernburg
6. Günther Friedrich Karl I, Prince of Schwarzburg-Sondershausen
26. Victor Frederick, Prince of Anhalt-Bernburg (= 20)
13. Princess Charlotte Wilhelmine of Anhalt-Bernburg
27. Margravine Albertine of Brandenburg-Schwedt (= 21)
3. Princess Emilie of Schwarzburg-Sondershausen
28. Louis Günther II, Prince of Schwarzburg-Rudolstadt
14. Frederick Charles, Prince of Schwarzburg-Rudolstadt
29. Countess Sophie Henriette Reuss of Untergreiz
7. Princess Karoline of Schwarzburg-Rudolstadt
30. John Frederick, Prince of Schwarzburg-Rudolstadt
15. Princess Friederike of Schwarzburg-Rudolstadt
31. Princess Bernardina Christina Sophia of Saxe-Weimar-Eisenach

Leopold III of Lippe House of Lippe Born: 1 September, 1821 Died: 8 December 1875
Regnal titles
Preceded by Leopold II	Prince of Lippe; 1851–1875	Succeeded by Woldemar
