= Leopold II of Lippe =

Leopold II
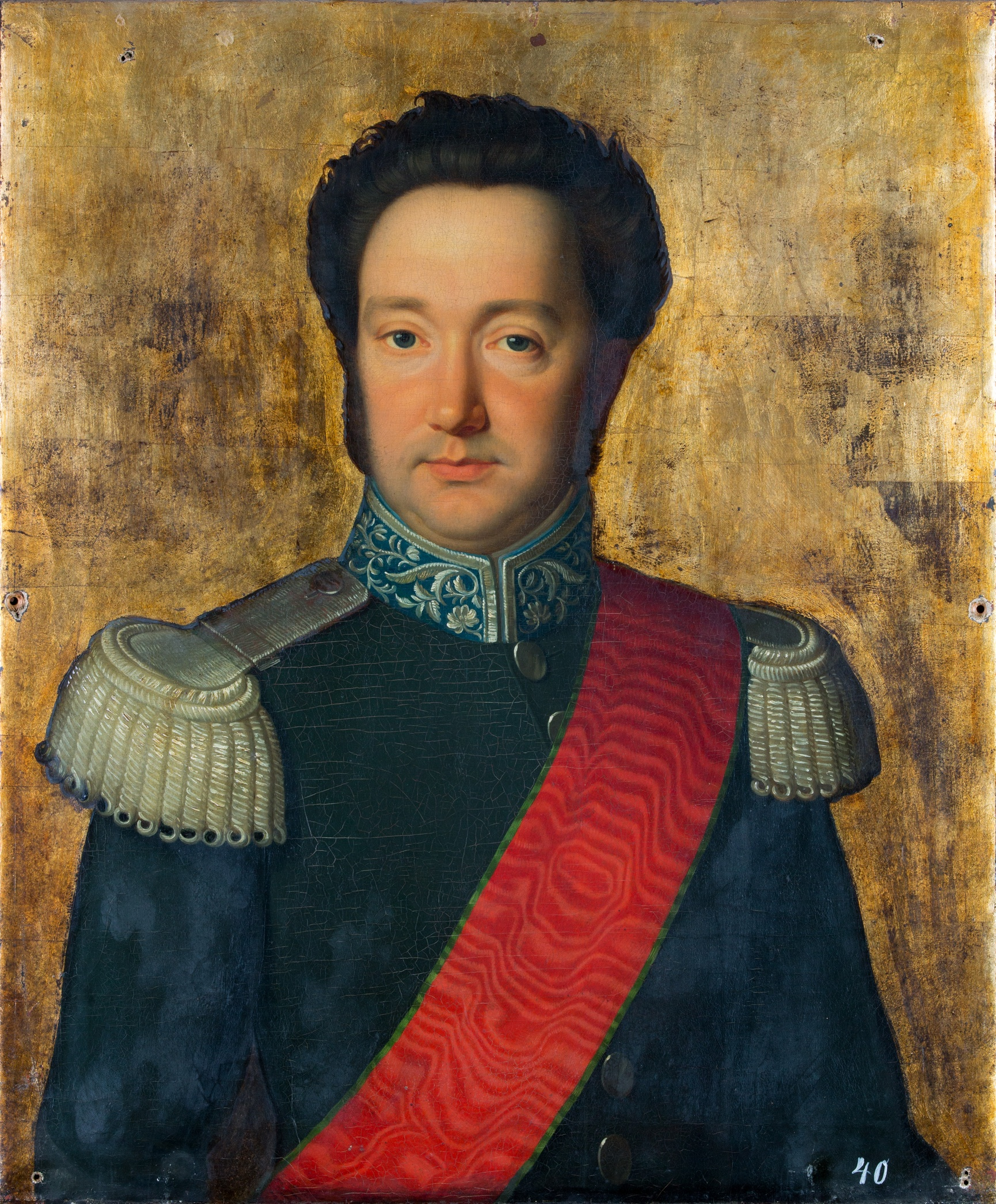

Prince of Lippe
- Reign: 5 November 1802 – 1 January 1851
- Predecessor: Leopold I
- Successor: Leopold III
- Born: 6 November 1796; Detmold
- Died: 1 January 1851 (aged 54); Detmold
- Spouse: Princess Emilie of Schwarzburg-Sondershausen (m. 1820)
- Issue: Leopold III, Prince of Lippe; Princess Luise; Woldemar, Prince of Lippe; Princess Friederike; Prince Friedrich; Prince Hermann; Alexander, Prince of Lippe; Prince Karl; Princess Pauline
- House: Lippe
- Father: Leopold I, Prince of Lippe
- Mother: Pauline of Anhalt-Bernburg

Leopold II of Lippe (Paul Alexander Leopold; 6 November 1796 – 1 January 1851) was the sovereign of the Principality of Lippe. He succeeded to the throne in 1802, and in 1820 he assumed control of the government from his mother, who had been acting as regent due to his youth at accession.

== Biography ==
Leopold II was born in Detmold, the eldest child of Leopold I, the reigning prince of Lippe and his consort Princess Pauline of Anhalt-Bernburg. He succeeded as Prince of Lippe on his father's death on 5 November 1802. As he was just six years old, his mother Princess Pauline acted as regent until 3 July 1820, when he assumed control of the government. During the regency, his mother had introduced a constitution in 1819 which created an assembly which at the time had more executive powers than any other assembly in Germany.

In 1825, he constructed a Court Theatre. Among those to perform at the theatre were Albert Lortzing and Ludwig Devrient, who were employed there from 1826 to 1833.

In the last years of his reign, the revolutions of 1848 broke out across all of Germany. Following his death in Detmold, he was succeeded on the throne by his eldest son Leopold III.

== Marriage and children ==
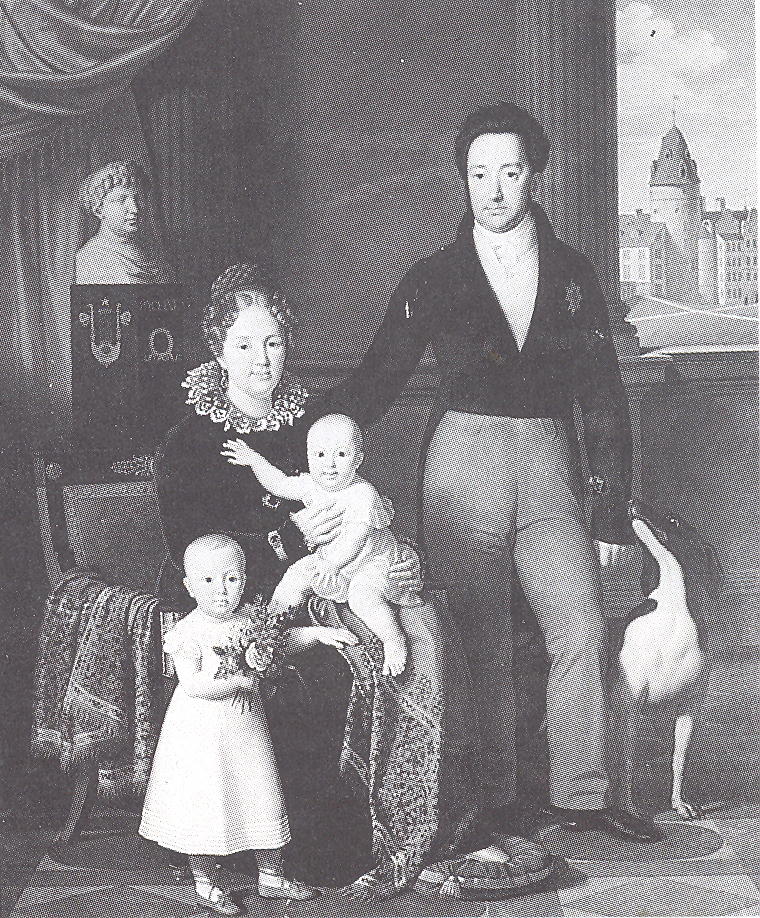
Portrait of Leopold II with his family

Prince Leopold was married in Arnstadt on 23 April 1820 to Princess Emilie of Schwarzburg-Sondershausen, a daughter of Günther Friedrich Karl I, Prince of Schwarzburg-Sondershausen, and Princess Caroline of Schwarzburg-Rudolstadt. They had nine children:

- Leopold III, Prince of Lippe (1821–1875), married to princess Elisabeth of Schwarzburg-Rudolstadt (1833–1896) on 17 April 1852.
- Princess Luise of Lippe (1822–1887)
- Woldemar, Prince of Lippe (1824–1895), married to Princess Sophie of Baden (7 August 1834 – 6 April 1904) on 9 November 1858.
- Princess Friederike of Lippe (1825–1897)
- Prince Friedrich of Lippe (1827–1854)
- Prince Hermann of Lippe (1829–1884)
- Alexander, Prince of Lippe (1831–1905)
- Prince Karl of Lippe (1832–1834)
- Princess Pauline of Lippe (1834–1906)

== Ancestry ==
Ancestors of Leopold II of Lippe

16. Frederick Adolphus, Count of Lippe-Detmold
8. Simon Henry Adolph, Count of Lippe-Detmold
17. Johanna Elisabeth of Nassau-Dillenburg
4. Simon August, Count of Lippe-Detmold
18. George August, Count of Nassau-Idstein
9. Countess Johanna Wilhelmina of Nassau-Idstein
19. Princess Henriette Dorothea of Oettingen
2. Leopold I, Prince of Lippe
20. Leopold I, Prince of Anhalt-Dessau
10. Leopold II, Prince of Anhalt-Dessau
21. Anna Louise Föhse
5. Maria Leopoldine of Anhalt-Dessau
22. Leopold, Prince of Anhalt-Köthen
11. Gisela Agnes of Anhalt-Köthen
23. Frederica Henriette of Anhalt-Bernburg
1. Leopold II, Prince of Lippe
24. Charles Frederick, Prince of Anhalt-Bernburg
12. Victor Frederick, Prince of Anhalt-Bernburg
25. Countess Sophie Albertine of Solms-Sonnenwalde
6. Frederick Albert, Prince of Anhalt-Bernburg
26. Albert Frederick, Margrave of Brandenburg-Schwedt
13. Albertine of Brandenburg-Schwedt
27. Princess Maria Dorothea of Courland
3. Pauline of Anhalt-Bernburg
28. Prince Christian Charles of Schleswig-Holstein-Sonderburg-Plön-Norburg
14. Frederick Charles, Duke of Schleswig-Holstein-Sonderburg-Plön
29. Dorothea Christina of Aichelberg
7. Louise Albertine of Schleswig-Holstein-Sonderburg-Plön
30. Christian Detlev, Count von Reventlow
15. Christine Armgard von Reventlow
31. Benedikta Margareta Brockdorff

Leopold II of Lippe House of Lippe Born: 6 November 1796 Died: 1 January 1851
Regnal titles
| Preceded by Leopold I | Prince of Lippe; 1802–1851 | Succeeded by Leopold III |
