= Woldemar, Prince of Lippe =

Prince of Lippe from 1875 to 1895

Woldemar
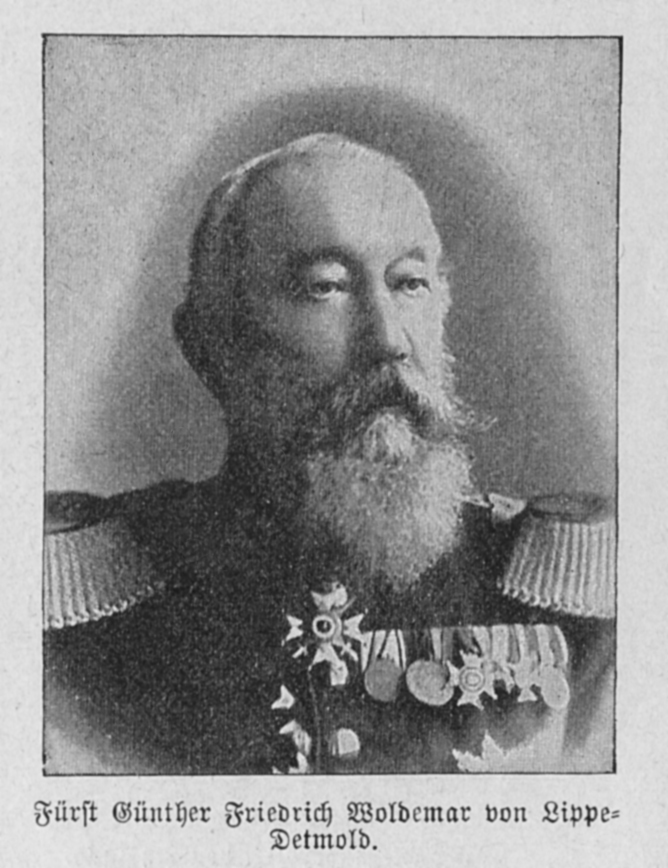
- Woldemar c. 1875–1895

Prince of Lippe
- Reign: 8 December 1875 – 20 March 1895
- Predecessor: Leopold III
- Successor: Alexander
- Born: 18 April 1824; Detmold
- Died: 20 March 1895 (aged 70); Detmold
- Spouse: Princess Sophie of Baden (m. 1858)
- House: Lippe
- Father: Leopold II
- Mother: Princess Emilie of Schwarzburg-Sondershausen

Woldemar of Lippe (Günther Friedrich Woldemar; 18 April 1824 – 20 March 1895) was the sovereign of the Principality of Lippe, reigning from 1875 until his death.

== Early life and reign ==
Prince Woldemar of Lippe was born in Detmold the third child of Leopold II, Lippe's reigning prince, and his consort, Princess Emilie of Schwarzburg-Sondershausen. Woldemar was married to Princess Sophie of Baden, a daughter of Prince William of Baden, on 9 November 1858 in Karlsruhe.

Following the death of his brother Leopold III on 8 December 1875, Woldemar succeeded him as Prince of Lippe. In 1892 along with the other German sovereigns Woldemar attended a gathering in Berlin with the German Emperor William II. After the Emperor described the other sovereigns as his vassals, Prince Woldemar took exception and interrupted the speech to say, "No, Sire, not your vassals. Your allies, if you like". This was seen as the coup de grâce to the Emperor's ambition to become "Emperor of Germany" instead of just "German Emperor".

== Death and regency dispute ==
Following his death in Detmold, Woldemar was succeeded as Prince of Lippe by his brother Alexander. His brother, however, was suffering from a mental illness, and as he had been placed under legal restrictions in 1870 and 1893, a regency was necessary to be established in Lippe. Prince Woldemar foreseeing this had made a provision in his will that the regency should go to Prince Adolf of Schaumburg-Lippe, the brother-in-law of the German Emperor.

Prince Woldemar's decision to appoint Prince Adolf was the beginning of a decade long dispute between two lines of the House of Lippe, the Lippe-Biesterfeld's led by Count Ernst who claimed the regency, and the princes of Schaumburg-Lippe. There were various compromises and the matter was finally resolved in 1905.

== Ancestry ==
Ancestors of Woldemar, Prince of Lippe

16. Simon Henry Adolph, Count of Lippe-Detmold
8. Simon August, Count of Lippe-Detmold
17. Princess Johannette Wilhelmine of Nassau-Idstein
4. Leopold I, Prince of Lippe
18. Leopold II, Prince of Anhalt-Dessau
9. Princess Maria Leopoldine of Anhalt-Dessau
19. Princess Gisela Agnes of Anhalt-Köthen
2. Leopold II, Prince of Lippe
20. Victor Frederick, Prince of Anhalt-Bernburg
10. Frederick Albert, Prince of Anhalt-Bernburg
21. Margravine Albertine of Brandenburg-Schwedt
5. Princess Pauline of Anhalt-Bernburg
22. Friedrich Carl, Duke of Schleswig-Holstein-Sonderburg-Plön
11. Princess Louise Albertine of Schleswig-Holstein-Sonderburg-Plön
23. Countess Christiane Irmgard of Reventlow
1. Woldemar, Prince of Lippe
24. Prince August of Schwarzburg-Sondershausen
12. Christian Günther III, Prince of Schwarzburg-Sondershausen
25. Princess Charlotte Sophie of Anhalt-Bernburg
6. Günther Friedrich Karl I, Prince of Schwarzburg-Sondershausen
26. Victor Frederick, Prince of Anhalt-Bernburg (= 20)
13. Princess Charlotte Wilhelmine of Anhalt-Bernburg
27. Margravine Albertine of Brandenburg-Schwedt (= 21)
3. Princess Emilie of Schwarzburg-Sondershausen
28. Louis Günther II, Prince of Schwarzburg-Rudolstadt
14. Frederick Charles, Prince of Schwarzburg-Rudolstadt
29. Countess Sophie Henriette Reuss of Untergreiz
7. Princess Karoline of Schwarzburg-Rudolstadt
30. John Frederick, Prince of Schwarzburg-Rudolstadt
15. Princess Friederike of Schwarzburg-Rudolstadt
31. Princess Bernardina Christina Sophia of Saxe-Weimar-Eisenach

Woldemar, Prince of Lippe House of Lippe Born: 18 April 1824 Died: 20 March 1895
Regnal titles
Preceded by Leopold III	Prince of Lippe; 1875–1895	Succeeded by Alexander
