= Leopold I of Lippe =

Leopold I
- Prince of Lippe
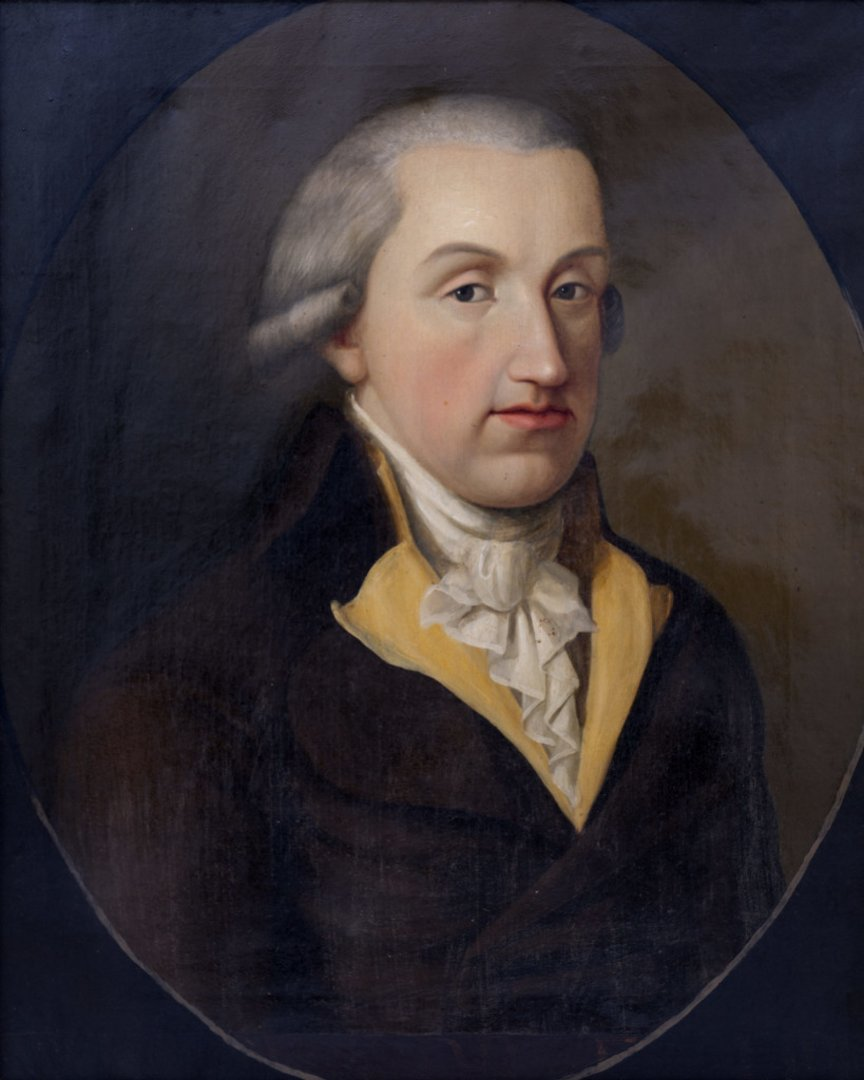
- Portrait by an unknown artist, c. 1790–1802
- Born: 2 December 1767; Detmold
- Died: 5 November 1802 (aged 34); Detmold
- Spouse: Princess Pauline of Anhalt-Bernburg (m. 1796)
- Issue: Leopold II; Prince Friedrich
- House: Lippe
- Father: Simon August, Count of Lippe-Detmold
- Mother: Princess Maria Leopoldine of Anhalt-Dessau

Leopold I of Lippe (2 December 1767 – 5 November 1802) was a Prince of Lippe.

== Biography ==
Leopold I was born in Detmold, the son of Simon August, Count of Lippe-Detmold (1727–1782), and his second wife, Princess Leopoldine of Anhalt-Dessau (1746–1769).

He received his education in Dessau, and when he reached 18 he went to study at the University of Leipzig. He succeeded his father as Count of Lippe-Detmold on his death on 1 May 1782, and remained Count until Lippe was raised to a Principality of the Holy Roman Empire in 1789.

In 1790, a mental disorder was diagnosed, and he was incapacitated by the Imperial Chamber Court; in 1795, the guardianship was conditionally lifted after an improvement occurred.

He died in Detmold and was succeeded as Prince by his eldest son, who became Leopold II.

== Marriage and children ==
He was married to Pauline Christine of Anhalt-Bernburg (23 February 1769 – 29 December 1820), daughter of Frederick Albert, Prince of Anhalt-Bernburg, and Louise Albertine of Schleswig-Holstein, on 2 January 1796 in Ballenstedt. From the marriage he had two sons:

- Leopold II, Prince of Lippe (1796–1851)
- Prince Friedrich (1797–1854)

== Ancestry ==
Ancestors of Leopold I of Lippe

16. Simon Henry, Count of Lippe
8. Frederick Adolphus, Count of Lippe-Detmold
17. Baroness Amalia of Dohna-Vianen
4. Simon Henry Adolph, Count of Lippe-Detmold
18. Adolph, Prince of Nassau-Schaumburg
9. Princess Johanna Elisabeth of Nassau-Dillenburg
19. Elisabeth Charlotte, Countess of Holzappel
2. Simon August, Count of Lippe-Detmold
20. John, Count of Nassau-Idstein
10. George August, Count of Nassau-Idstein
21. Countess Anna of Leiningen-Dagsburg
5. Johanna Wilhelmina of Nassau-Idstein
22. Albert Ernest I, Prince of Oettingen-Oettingen
11. Princess Henriette Dorothea of Oettingen-Oettingen
23. Duchess Christiane Friederike of Württemberg
1. Leopold I, Prince of Lippe
24. John George II, Prince of Anhalt-Dessau
12. Leopold I, Prince of Anhalt-Dessau
25. Countess Henriette Catherine of Nassau
6. Leopold II, Prince of Anhalt-Dessau
26. Rudolf Föhse
13. Anna Louise Föhse
27. Agnes Ohme
3. Maria Leopoldine of Anhalt-Dessau
28. Emmanuel Lebrecht, Prince of Anhalt-Köthen
14. Leopold, Prince of Anhalt-Köthen
29. Gisela Agnes of Rath
7. Gisela Agnes of Anhalt-Köthen
30. Karl Frederick, Prince of Anhalt-Bernburg
15. Frederica Henriette of Anhalt-Bernburg
31. Countess Sophie Albertine of Solms-Sonnenwalde

Leopold I of Lippe House of Lippe Born: 2 December 1767 Died: 5 November 1802
Regnal titles
Preceded by Simon August	Count of Lippe-Detmold; 1782–1789	Raised to Prince
New title Previously Count	Prince of Lippe; 1789–1802	Succeeded by Leopold II
