= Henrietta Catherine Agnes of Anhalt-Dessau =

Baroness of Loën & Dean of Herford Abbey

- Born: 5 June 1744; Dessau
- Died: 15 December 1799 (aged 55); Dessau
- Spouse: Baron Johann Jost of Loën
- House: Ascania
- Father: Leopold II Maximilian of Anhalt-Dessau
- Mother: Gisela Agnes

Henrietta Catherine Agnes of Anhalt-Dessau (born 5 June 1744 in Dessau; died 15 December 1799 in Dessau) was a princess of Anhalt-Dessau by birth, Dean of Herford Abbey and by marriage Baroness of Loën.

== Life ==
Agnes, also called Agnese, was a daughter of Prince Leopold II Maximilian of Anhalt-Dessau from his marriage to Gisela Agnes, daughter of Prince Leopold of Anhalt-Köthen. At the age of six months, she was made a canoness in Herford Abbey; this should provide her for life. She developed a particularly close relationship with her sisters Maria Leopoldine and Casimire. She followed them to Detmold, when they married there. As the oldest sister, Agnes took over the duties of representation at the court in Dessau, until her brother Leopold III married. She then returned to Detmold. After both her sisters had died, she moved to Herford Abbey in 1769, where she became the Dean.

She entered into a morganatic marriage on 26 October 1779 at Bosfeld House in Rheda-Wiedenbrück with Baron Johann Jost of Loën, Lord of Cappeln and Tecklenburg, son of Johann Michael von Loën. Johann Jost's mother was a first cousin of Catharina Elisabeth Goethe, the mother of Johann Wolfgang von Goethe. From 1795, Agnes and John Jost lived in Dessau and had a keen interest in the social life of the city. They were in close contact with their Goethe relatives. After a visit, she wrote in 1796: In Dessau, the memory of earlier times delighted us: the Loën family proved to be comfortable, trusting relatives and we could remembered our earliest days and hours together in Frankfurt.

Agnes's son Frederick later became Marshal of the Princely Court at Dessau and her daughter Agnes was the wife of Count Heinrich Ernst Leopold of Seherr-Thoß, who were the ancestors of Queen Geraldine of Albania.

== Sources ==
- Eva Labouvie: Schwestern und Freundinnen: zur Kulturgeschichte weiblicher Kommunikation, Böhlau Verlag Köln Weimar, 2009, p. 321 ff
