= Leopold III of Anhalt-Dessau =

Leopold III
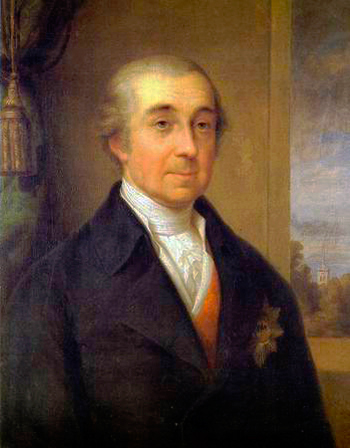
- Early 19th-century portrait

Prince, then Duke of Anhalt-Dessau
- Reign: 16 December 1751 – 9 August 1817
- Predecessor: Leopold II
- Successor: Leopold IV
- Regent: Dietrich of Anhalt-Dessau
- Born: 10 August 1740; Dessau, Anhalt
- Died: 9 August 1817 (aged 76); Luisium Castle, near Dessau, Anhalt
- Spouse: Louise of Brandenburg-Schwedt (m. 1767; died 1811)
- Issue: Frederick, Hereditary Prince of Anhalt-Dessau
Names
- Leopold Friedrich Franz
- House: Ascania
- Father: Leopold II
- Mother: Gisela Agnes of Anhalt-Köthen
- Religion: Lutheranism

Leopold III Frederick Franz, Duke of Anhalt-Dessau (10 August 1740 – 9 August 1817), known as "Prince Franz" or "Father Franz", was a German prince of the House of Ascania. From 1751 until 1807 he was reigning prince of the Principality of Anhalt-Dessau and from 1807 the first Duke of the Duchy of Anhalt-Dessau.

A strong supporter of the Enlightenment, Leopold undertook numerous reforms in his principality and made Anhalt-Dessau one of the most modern and prosperous of the small German states. An Anglophile, Leopold also extended and altered the old gardens of Oranienbaum that were laid out in Dutch style to create the first and largest of the English parks of his time, renamed the Dessau-Wörlitz Garden Realm.

== Early life ==
Leopold was born at Dessau as the eldest son of the later Leopold II, Prince of Anhalt-Dessau, by his wife Gisela Agnes, daughter of Leopold, Prince of Anhalt-Köthen.

After having lost both parents in 1751 (his mother on 20 April and his father on 16 December), the eleven-year-old Leopold inherited Anhalt-Dessau under the regency of his uncle, Prince Dietrich.

Following in the footsteps of his grandfather and father, Leopold joined the Prussian Army. After the Battle of Kolín (18 June 1757), he was impressed so negatively by the spectacle of warfare that he resigned from the army and declared the neutrality of Anhalt-Dessau.

== Rule ==
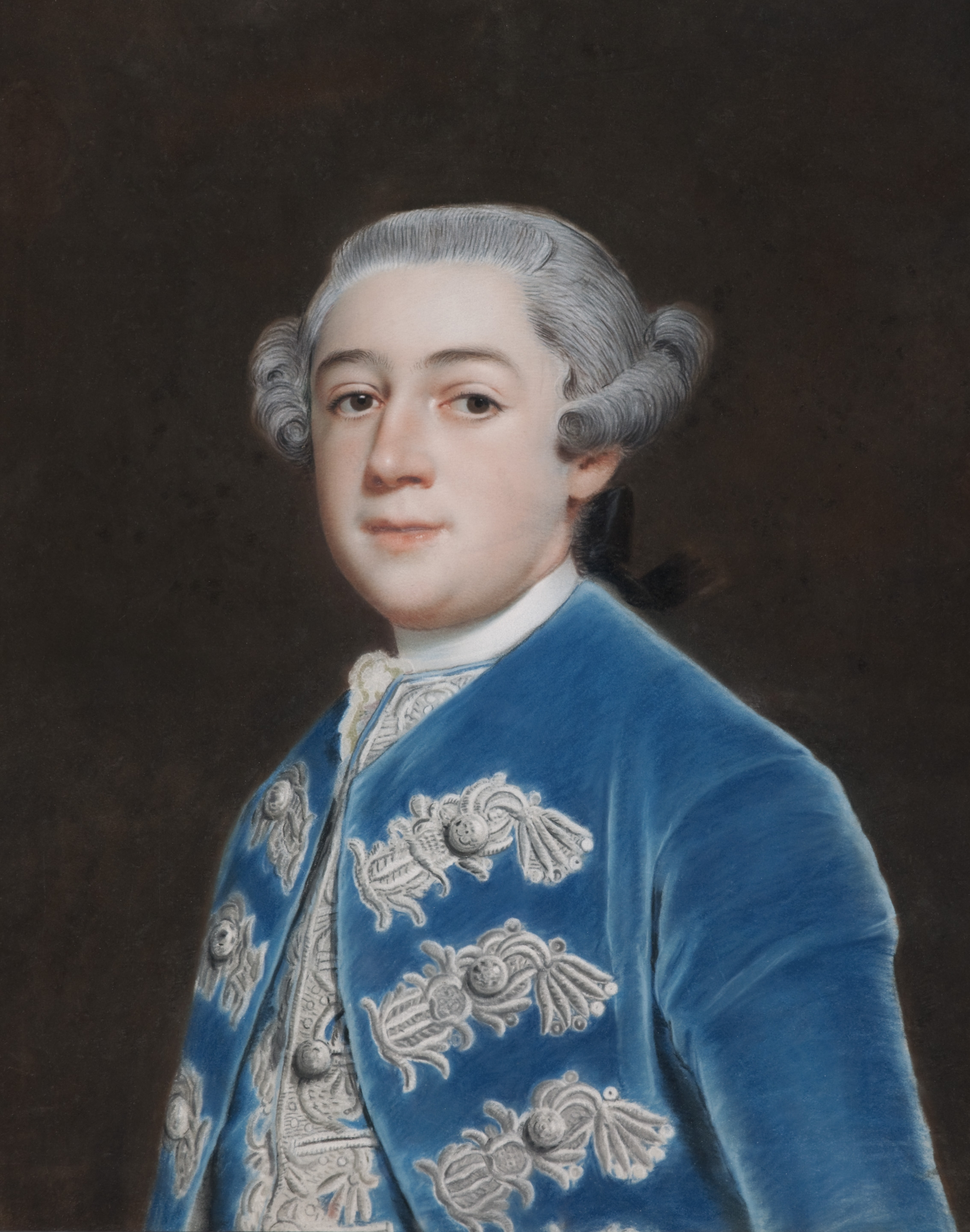
Portrait of Leopold III in 1762

In 1758 he was declared of age and assumed the government of his lands.

An Anglophile and strong supporter of the Enlightenment, Leopold took special interest in the education of the population of his principality in science and nature. His numerous reforms in the areas of education, health care, social services, roads, agriculture, forestry, and industry made Anhalt-Dessau one of the most modern and prosperous of the small German states.

The most conspicuous of his improvements included planting fruit trees along dykes and the construction of beautiful buildings. However his reforms included public works programs repairing dykes destroyed by flooding, providing social housing, education, sanitation, the first public parks, burial grounds irrespective of social rank, as well as liberal policies towards the Jewish community, including allowing for the founding of a Jewish school and the first Jewish newspaper in Germany.

He engaged Friedrich Wilhelm von Erdmannsdorff to build Wörlitz Palace (1769–1773), the first Neoclassical building in Germany. In 1774 Leopold engaged von Erdmannsdorff to construct a small residence with a small English park as a gift to his wife; in her honor, the castle took the name Schloss Luisium.

Leopold also extended and altered the old gardens of Oranienbaum that were laid out in Dutch style to create the first and largest of the English parks of his time, renamed the Dessau-Wörlitz Garden Realm.

In 1782, Leopold was tried by the Fürstenbund for his opposition to Prussian hegemony. In 1806 he was invited to Paris by Napoleon, who was impressed by his reputation. Leopold was one of the last princes to join the Confederation of the Rhine on 18 April 1807. On the other hand, despite his differences with the Prussian crown, he offered the Prussian rebel Major Ferdinand von Schill an honorable reception in Dessau on May 2, 1809.

Leopold was elevated to the rank of duke in 1807. As the head of the senior Anhalt branch, he could not earlier by etiquette receive his kinsmen, the Princes of Anhalt-Köthen and Anhalt-Bernburg, who were raised to that rank before him. He received the title by paying a considerable sum of money to the Emperor shortly before the dissolution of the Holy Roman Empire in 1806, just as the prince of Anhalt-Bernburg had done before him.

In 1812, Leopold became regent of the duchy of Anhalt-Köthen during the minority of Duke Louis Augustus Karl Frederick Emil.

Leopold died after a fall from his horse at Schloss Luisium, near Dessau, in 1817. He was succeeded by his eldest grandson Leopold IV, because his son, the Hereditary Prince Frederick, had predeceased him.

== Marriage and issue ==
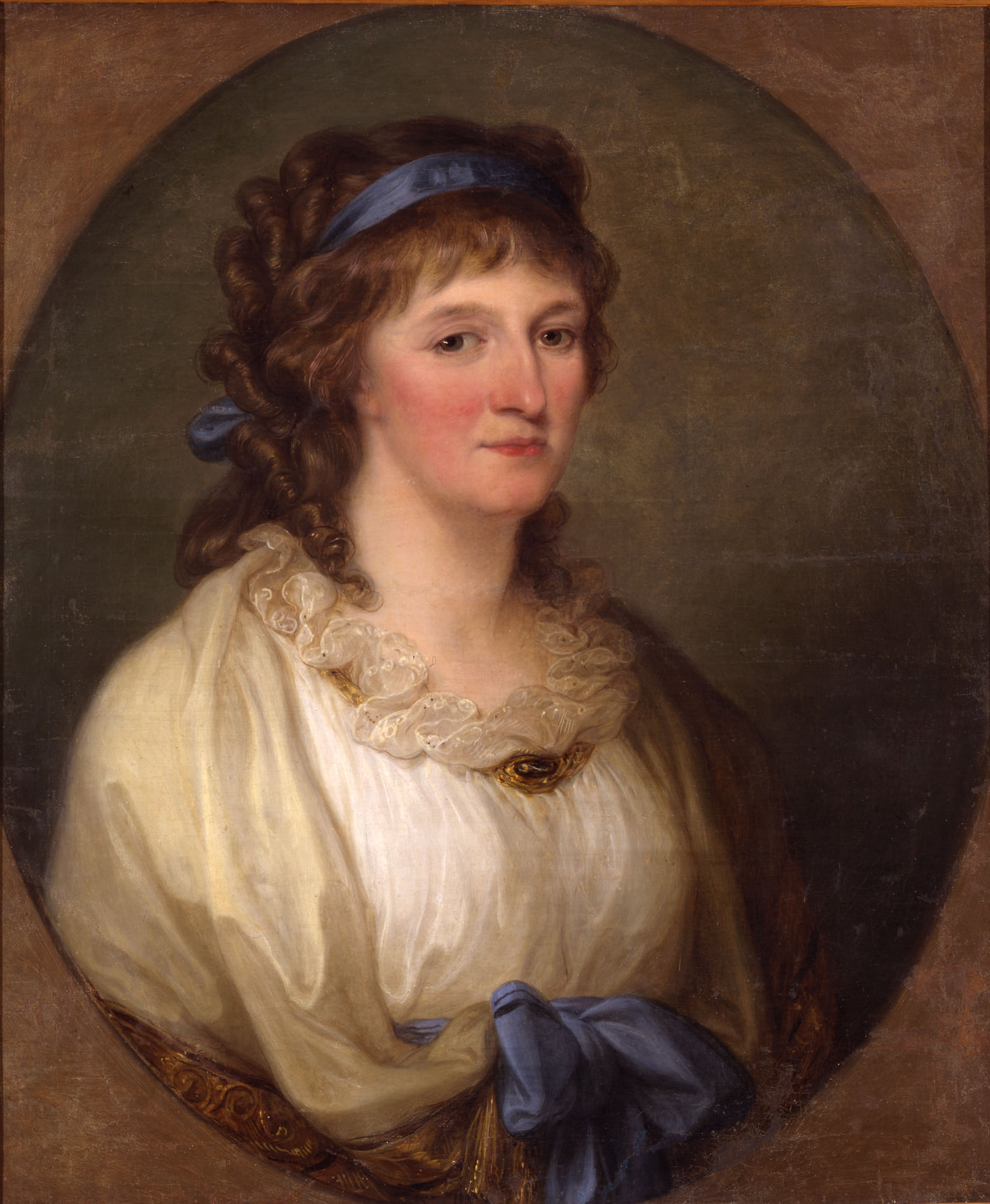
Princess Louise of Brandenburg-Schwedt

In Charlottenburg on 25 July 1767 Leopold married his cousin Louise Henriette Wilhelmine, daughter of Frederick Henry, Margrave of Brandenburg-Schwedt, and his wife Leopoldine Marie of Anhalt-Dessau, a sister of his father. They had two children:

1. A daughter (b. and d. Dessau, 11 February 1768).
2. Frederick, Hereditary Prince of Anhalt-Dessau (b. Dessau, 27 December 1769 – d. Dessau, 27 May 1814).

He also had ten illegitimate children:

- With Johanna Eleonore Hoffmeyer (b. 12 November 1739 – d. 3 May 1816), by marriage von Neitschütz since 1765:
1. Wilhelmine Eleonore Fredericka [of Waldersee] (b. Dessau, 14 June 1762 – d. Dessau, 23 September 1762).
2. Count Franz John George of Waldersee (b. Dessau, 5 September 1763 – d. Dessau, 30 May 1823), married in Dessau on 20 May 1787 to Countess Louise of Anhalt (morganatic granddaughter of the Hereditary Prince William Gustav, eldest son and heir of Prince Leopold I of Anhalt-Dessau). They had six children, three sons (Franz Henry, Eduard and Frederick Gustav) and three daughters (Louise, Amalie Agnes and Marie). Their descendants through the eldest son Franz Henry are still alive. A descendant of Franz Heinrich {1791-1873} and Bertha von Hünerbein {1799-1859} was General Alfred von Waldersee.
3. Louise Eleonore Fredericka of Waldersee (b. Dessau, 30 August 1765 – d. 1804).
- With Leopoldine Luise Schoch, daughter of his Master Gardener, who was ennobled with the surname "von Beringer":
1. Wilhelmine Sidonie von Beringer (b. Wörlitz, 5 January 1789 – d. Halle, 20 April 1860), married in Wörlitz on 20 June 1815 to Wilhelm von Goerne.
2. Louise Adelheid von Beringer (b. Dessau, 16 October 1790 – d. Halle, 5 June 1870), married in Wörlitz on 19 August 1812 to Friedrich Ludwig Wilhelm Georg von Glafey.
3. Franz Adolf von Beringer (b. Wörlitz, 2 June 1792 – d. 28 February 1834), married to Auguste Wilhelmine Roeser (b. 2 June 1793 – d. 25 August 1855). They had one son Wilhelm, and one granddaughter, Magda, with the line apparently becoming extinct.
- With Johanna Magdalena Luise Jäger (b. 1763 – d. ?):
1. Franziska Jäger (b. 1789 – d. ?).
2. Leopoldine Jäger (b. 1791 – d. 1847).
3. Amalie Jäger (b. 1793 – d. 1841).
- With Fredricka Wilhelmine Schulz (b. 1772 – d. 1843), by marriage Favreau:
1. Louis Ferdinand Schulz (b. 1800 – d. 1893).

== Ancestry ==
Ancestors of Leopold III of Anhalt-Dessau

8. John George II, Prince of Anhalt-Dessau
4. Leopold I, Prince of Anhalt-Dessau
9. Countess Henriette Catherine of Nassau
2. Leopold II, Prince of Anhalt-Dessau
10. Rudolf Föhse
5. Anna Louise Föhse
11. Agnes Ohme
1. Leopold III, Duke of Anhalt-Dessau
12. Emmanuel Lebrecht, Prince of Anhalt-Köthen
6. Leopold, Prince of Anhalt-Köthen
13. Gisela Agnes of Rath
3. Princess Gisela Agnes of Anhalt-Köthen
14. Karl Frederick, Prince of Anhalt-Bernburg
7. Frederica Henriette of Anhalt-Bernburg
15. Sophie Albertine of Solms-Sonnenwalde

Leopold III of Anhalt-Dessau House of Ascania Born: 10 August 1740 Died: 9 August 1817
Regnal titles
Preceded by Leopold II	Prince of Anhalt-Dessau; 1751–1817	Succeeded by Leopold IV
