= Weinkauf =

Weinkauf is an occupational surname of German origin, referring to a wine merchant. Notable people with the surname include:

- Danny Weinkauf (born 1963), American musician and composer
- Leo Weinkauf (born 1996), German footballer
