= Princess Casimire of Anhalt-Dessau =

Casimire of Anhalt-Dessau
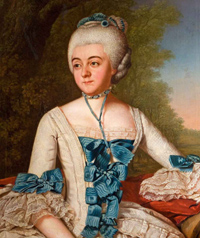
- Portrait by Anna Rosina de Gasc
- Born: 19 January 1749; Dessau
- Died: 8 November 1778 (aged 29); Detmold
- Spouse: Simon August, Count of Lippe-Detmold
- House: Ascania
- Father: Leopold II, Prince of Anhalt-Dessau
- Mother: Gisela Agnes of Anhalt-Köthen

Casimire of Anhalt-Dessau (19 January 1749, Dessau – 8 November 1778, Detmold) was a princess of Anhalt-Dessau by birth and the Countess of Lippe-Detmold by marriage.

== Life ==
Casimire was a daughter of Prince Leopold II Maximilian of Anhalt-Dessau (1700–1751) from his marriage to Gisela Agnes (1722–1751), daughter of Prince Leopold of Anhalt-Köthen. She had a particularly close relationship with her sisters Agnes and Marie Leopoldine, with whom she mostly lived together, even after her marriage, and with whom she conducted an extensive correspondence when they were not together.

She married on 9 November 1769 in Dessau Count Simon August of Lippe-Detmold (1727–1782), widower of her sister Marie Leopoldine, who had died in April that year. She was religiously tolerant and socially engaged. She was involved in a number of administrative issues and she planned reforms in Lippe, some of which she managed to implement. She had significant influence on her husband and became the mainstay of the reforms sought by Chancellor Hoffmann. Casimire was involved in care for the poor and health care and education. In 1775 she founded the "Patriotic Society" one of the oldest rural credit institutions in Germany.

In 1777, Casimire died due to scarlet fever.

== Descendants ==
From her marriage with Simon August, Casimire had a son:

- Casimir August (1777–1809), Prince of Lippe-Detmold

== References and sources ==
- Günther Engelbert (1977). "Kasimire". Neue Deutsche Biographie (in German). Vol. 11. Berlin: Duncker & Humblot. pp. 317–317.
- Eva Labouvie: Schwestern und Freundinnen: zur Kulturgeschichte weiblicher Kommunikation, Böhlau Verlag, Cologne / Weimar, 2009, p. 321 ff
- Gottlob Friedrich Wilhelm Chapon: Leben und letzte Stunden der weiland Durchlauchtigsten Fürstinn Casimire, Regierenden Gräfinn und Edlen Frau zur Lippe, geb. Prinzessinn zu Anhalt, Lemgo, 1780, LLB Detmold
