= Princess Pauline of Anhalt-Bernburg =

Princess of Lippe (1796–1802) and regent (1802–1820)

Princess Pauline
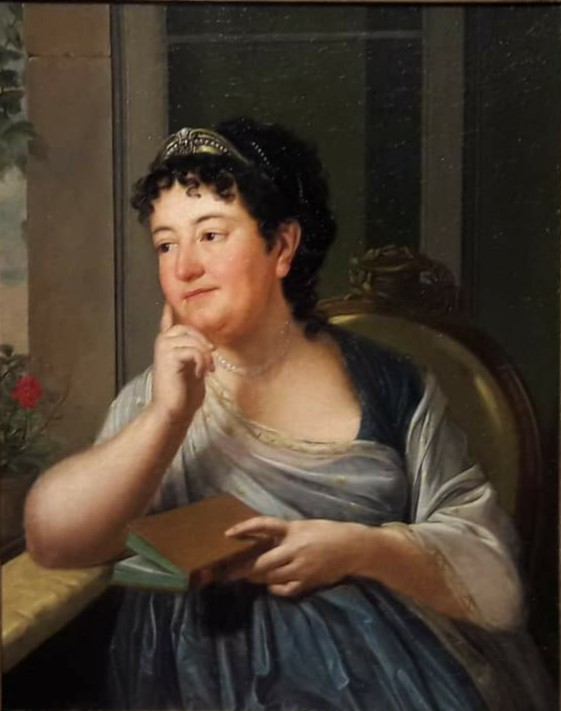
- Portrait by Johann Christoph Rincklake, 1801

Princess consort of Lippe
- Tenure: 2 January 1796 – 5 November 1802

Regent of Lippe
- Tenure: 5 November 1802 – 3 July 1820
- Born: 23 February 1769; Ballenstedt, Anhalt-Bernburg
- Died: 29 December 1820 (aged 51); Detmold
- Burial: Detmold Mausoleum
- Spouse: Leopold I, Prince of Lippe (m. 1796; died 1802)
- Issue: Leopold II; Prince Frederick; Princess Louise
- House: Ascania
- Father: Frederick Albert, Prince of Anhalt-Bernburg
- Mother: Louise Albertine of Schleswig-Holstein-Sonderburg-Plön
- Religion: Calvinism

Pauline Christine Wilhelmine of Anhalt-Bernburg (also: Princess Pauline of Lippe; 23 February 1769 – 29 December 1820) was a princess consort of Lippe, married in 1796 to Leopold I, Prince of Lippe. She served as the regent of Lippe during the minority of her son from 1802 to 1820. She is regarded as one of the most important rulers of Lippe. On 1 January 1809, she abolished serfdom by princely decree. She managed to keep the principality independent during the Napoleonic Wars. She wrote a constitution, in which the power of the estates was reduced. In the collective historical consciousness of the Lippe population, however, she is best remembered for her social goals. Influenced by French reformist writings, she founded the first day care center in Germany, a labor school for neglected children, a voluntary work camp for adult charity recipients and a health care institution with first aid center.

== Life ==
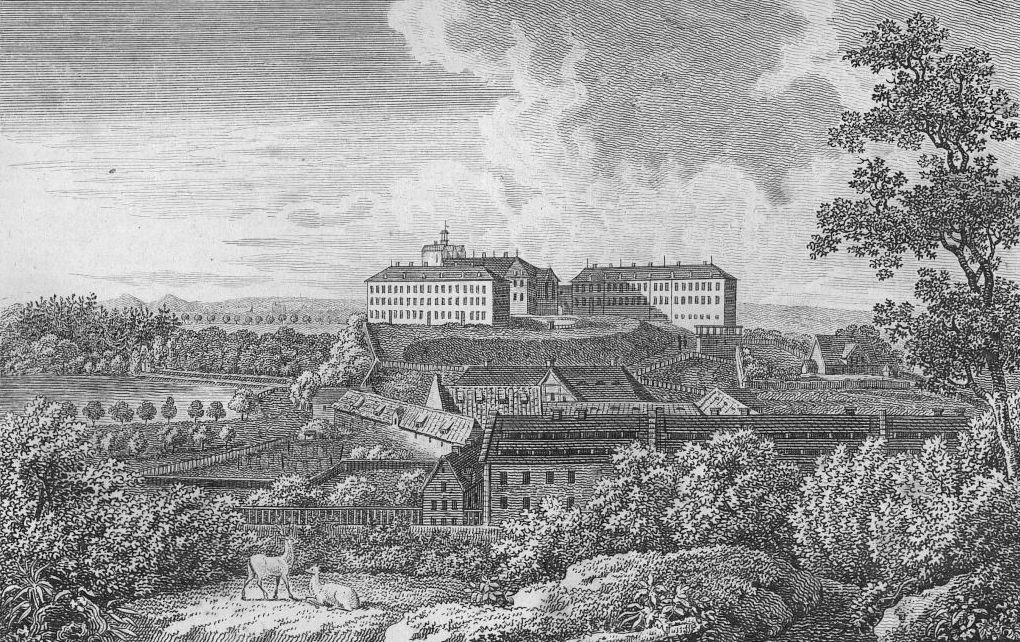
Ballenstedt Castle

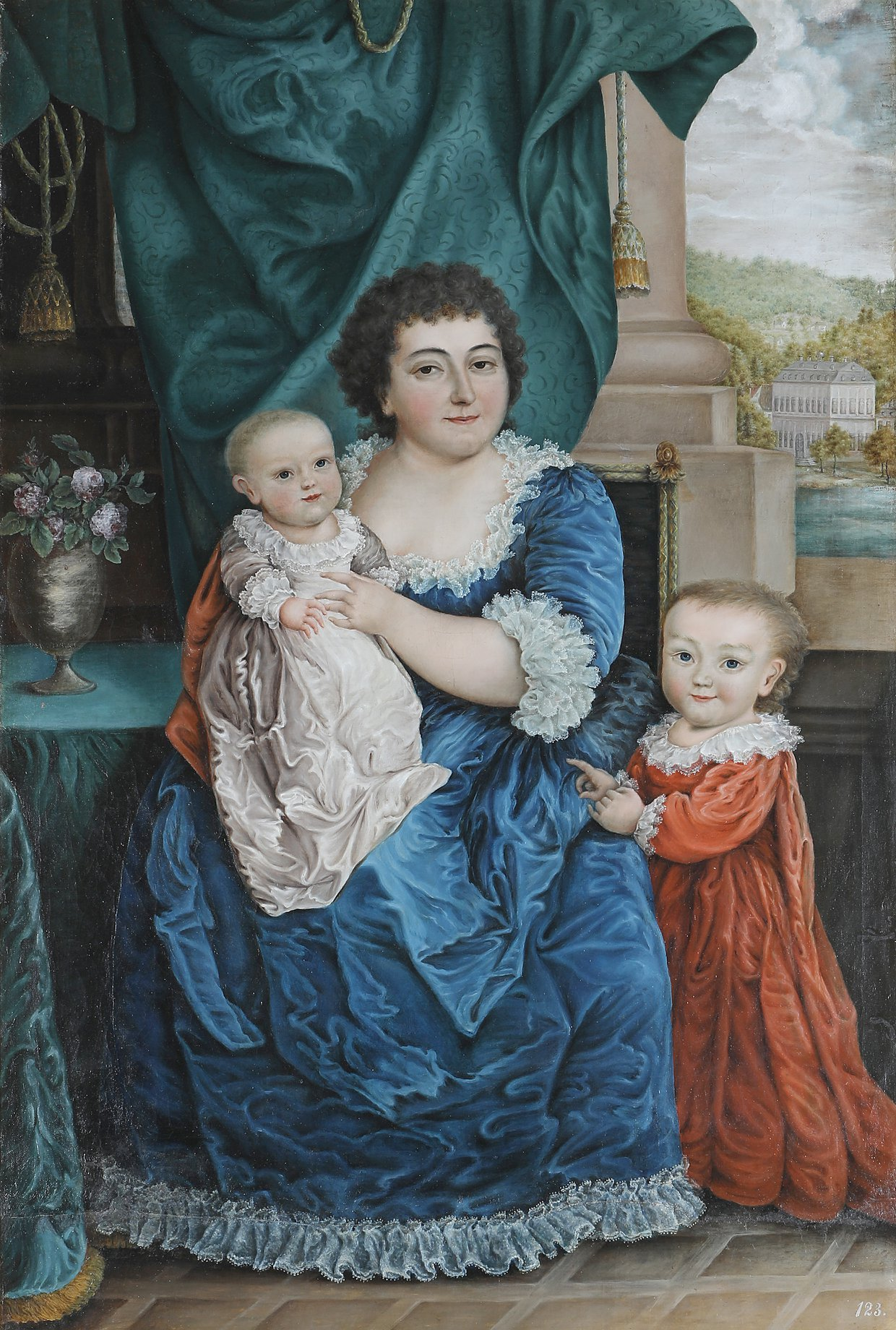
Pauline with her sons, Frederick and Leopold (right)

Pauline was born in Ballenstedt, the daughter of Prince Frederick Albert, Prince of Anhalt-Bernburg and his wife Louise Albertine of Schleswig-Holstein-Sonderburg-Plön. A few days after her birth, her mother died of the measles. She had an elder brother, Alexius Frederick Christian (1767–1834), who was Duke of Anhalt-Bernburg from 1807. It was noticed at an early age that Pauline had an alert mind. Her father, Prince Frederick Albert personally took over the upbringing of his daughter Pauline and his son and heir Alexei. She was a good student and learned French in addition to Latin, history and political sciences. Already at 13 years of age, she assisted her father in the business of government. First she took over the French correspondence, and later the entire correspondence between the residence in Ballenstedt Castle and the government offices in Bernburg. Her education was strongly influenced by Christian ethics and the ideas of the Enlightenment. Later Pauline continued to practice what she had learned in her youth, such as the teachings of Johann Heinrich Pestalozzi and Jean-Jacques Rousseau.

On 2 January 1796 Princess Pauline of Anhalt-Bernburg married Prince Leopold I of Lippe. The wedding was celebrated in Ballenstedt, and on 21 January 1796 the couple returned to Detmold, under great cheers of the population. Leopold of Lippe had been asking for her hand for years, but Pauline had repeatedly rejected his suits. The marriage took place only after Leopold's health improved. Previously, he had been put under guardianship for a short time because of mental confusion. In the following years, Pauline spoke positively about their marriage and her "loving" husband. She confessed in a letter to her trusted cousin Frederick Christian of Schleswig-Holstein-Sonderburg-Augustenburg:

I have never done a step with more consideration than this, I never decided more cold-bloodedly, because my love was really no magnifying glass in front of [...], my heart that on closer acquaintance overruled my reason. The Prince is good, noble, and righteous; he loves me and appreciates me and has far more internal values than appearances.

— Pauline, correspondence (quoted in Knittel)

Pauline gave birth to two sons, Leopold (born 6 November 1796) and Frederick (born 8 December 1797). A third child, a girl named Louise, died shortly after birth on 17 July 1800.

Leopold I died on 4 April 1802 and on 18 May Pauline took up the regency for her minor son, the later prince Leopold. In the marriage contract between Leopold and Pauline from 1795, it had been agreed that Pauline, as the future mother, should take both the guardianship and the regency of a minor prince. The Estates of Lippe fiercely opposed this rule. However, no appropriate male guardian was available and Pauline had also already demonstrated that she would be a suitable regent. Her reign lasted nearly two decades, and is regarded as a happy chapter in the history of Lippe.

Pauline held from 1818 until her death in 1820 the office of Mayor of Lemgo, overlapping the period she ruled Lippe. After the Napoleonic Wars, the city was heavily indebted. When mayor Overbeck died in 1817, no suitable new mayor could be found, and the magistrates and citizens decided on 4 January 1818 to ask Pauline ... to take a period the police and financial posts of the government of the city under her immediate direction for a period of six years .... Pauline answered on the same day and, contrary to everyone's expectations, she accepted the invitation. Locally, she was represented by the talented and dedicated lawyer Kestner, acting as Commissioner. She managed to improve the financial and social situation by taking some unpopular measures, but always with respect for the parliamentary rules of the city. Like in Detmold in 1801, she founded a workhouse for the poor and a service club under her own direction.

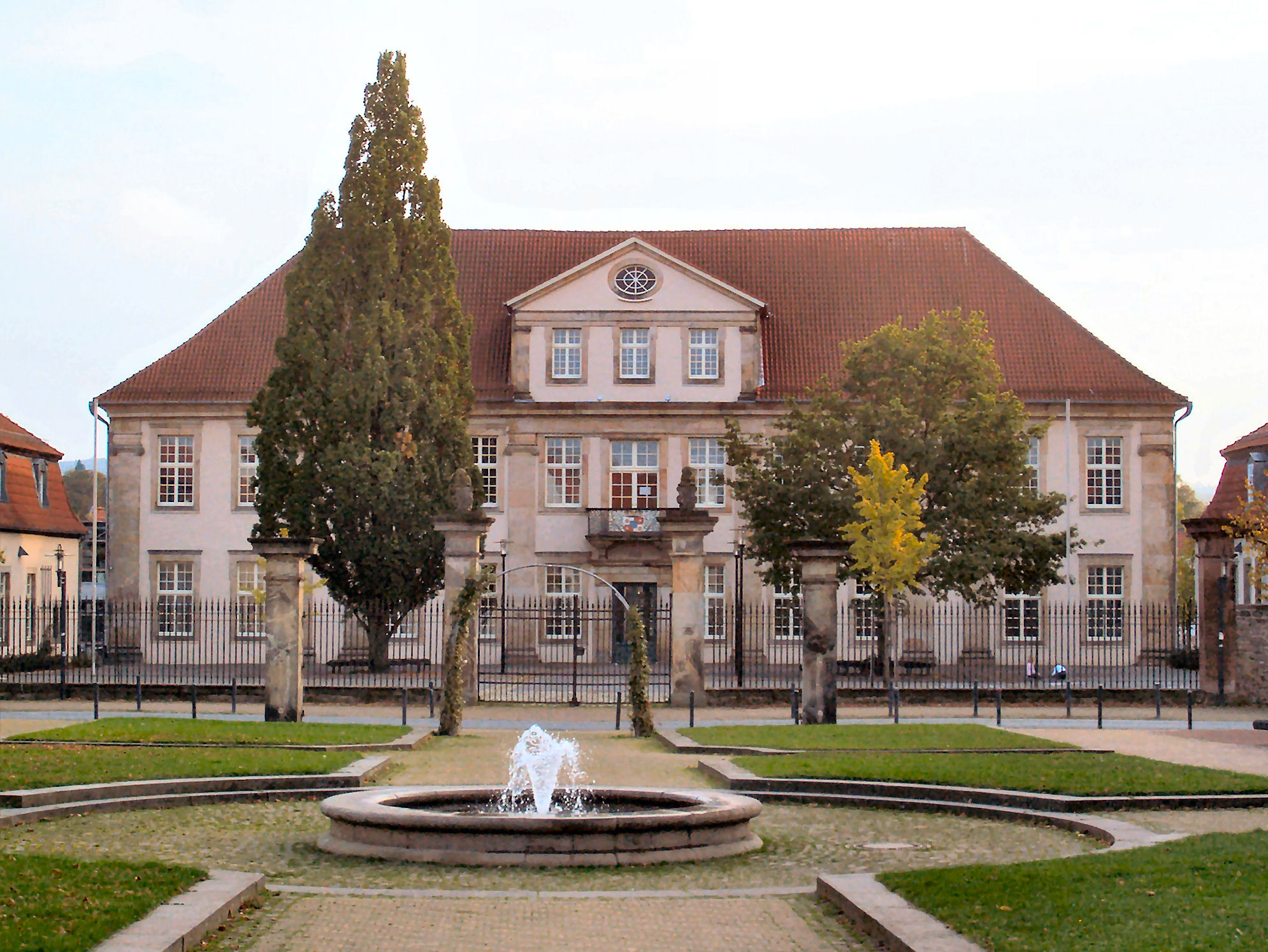
The Lippehof in Lemgo, now the Engelbert Kaempfer-Gymnasium

She planned to retire to the Lippehof, a baroque palace built in Lemgo in 1734, but she died on 29 December 1820, a few months after she had handed over government business to her son Leopold II on 3 July 1820.

== Character, personality and theory of government ==
In comparison with her contemporary Queen Louise of Sweden Pauline has in the historic context not been glorified as idealistic. She held her position publicly and privately, and often reacted quite violently when she disagreed. This led to quite a few angry and ironic commentaries during her lifetime.

Her biographer Hans Kiewning has described her as the regent of Lippe, who was far superior to all those around her, who would also have been an unusual phenomenon in a larger context. The historian Heinrich von Treitschke called her one of the cleverest women of her time. Her contemporary Ferdinand Weerth described her in his sermons as Princely in her whole being, an unusual degree of mental strength, the clear light mind, [...] and her tireless work.

Pauline was challenging her two sons, especially Leopold, the heir apparent. She carefully selected teachers, however, she considered herself to be too impatient in dealing with their sons, which sometimes led to violent confrontations.

The only where Princess Pauline failed was the education of her own two sons, her only children. In order to teach them the principles of strict morality she had treated them for too long as children, and had bullied them both to such an extent that the eldest, who was shy and reserved by nature, had become half wild.

— Malvida von Meysenbug, memoirs (quoted by Meysenbug: Memoiren einer Idealistin)

The Prince and the state government had to agree with the Estates, the nobility as landowners and representatives of the cities, on important political issues. Before Pauline's rule, the sovereign, the government and the Estates had usually been able to work out a compromise, despite their often conflicting interests. Pauline, however, was accustomed to the absolute monarchy as practiced in Anhalt-Bernburg, where the Prince ultimately takes the decision. She did not want to allow the Estates to talk her out of realizing her well-intentioned social plans. She felt that she knew what was best for the country and its inhabitants. In 1805, the Estates rejected her plan to introduce a tax on liquor to finance a hospital for the insane. After that, she rarely summoned the Estates and mostly ruled by decree.

The government of Lippe had been presided over by a chancellor or prime minister since the 18th century. Their weight grew over time. They rarely came into conflict with Princess Pauline, since their reform ideas of both sides were largely compatible with hers. Pauline regularly participated in meetings of the cabinet or the parliament and made her decisions there. Such sessions were often dominated by her impatience and her desire to lead. Her main focus was on foreign policy, however, because she spoke and wrote better French than any of her officials. She broke through the male monopoly, which in those days was only possible due to her Princely rank. No other females were active in the Lippe government, until some female councillors were elected after 1945. She took over the foreign ministry in 1810 and in 1817 the Princess also took up the management of the "madhouse" (as it was called at the time), the house of correction and the distribution of subsidies. In the relationship to her subjects, she was often close to the people, but ultimately, she had an autocratic style of government.

== Social Policies ==
The publications of Count Rumford inspired Pauline to put into practice her ideas on the state organization of the poor relief. She believed the cause of poverty and begging in her country was mainly to be found in the Lippe national character with his penchant for laziness and idleness. From the scientific literature on poor relief available to her, she gathered that real improvement could only be achieved through labor, voluntary or otherwise, and not through financial handouts.

Inspired by this, Pauline continued the policies introduced by her late stepmother-in-law Casimire of Anhalt-Dessau, (1749–1778), in accordance with the socio-political beliefs of their time. Among the institutions founded by Pauline were a vocational school (1799), a day care center (1802), the hospital (1801–1802), the voluntary workhouse (1802). An orphanage already existed since 1720, and a teacher training college had been founded in 1781. She grouped these six institutions under the term nursing homes and housed them in a former convent. They formed the nucleus of today's Princess Pauline Foundation in Detmold. The nursing home claimed that they could provide assistance "from the cradle to the grave". It was considered unique and was often visited by foreign guests, who praised especially the day care center. The services were, however, only available to residents of Detmold.

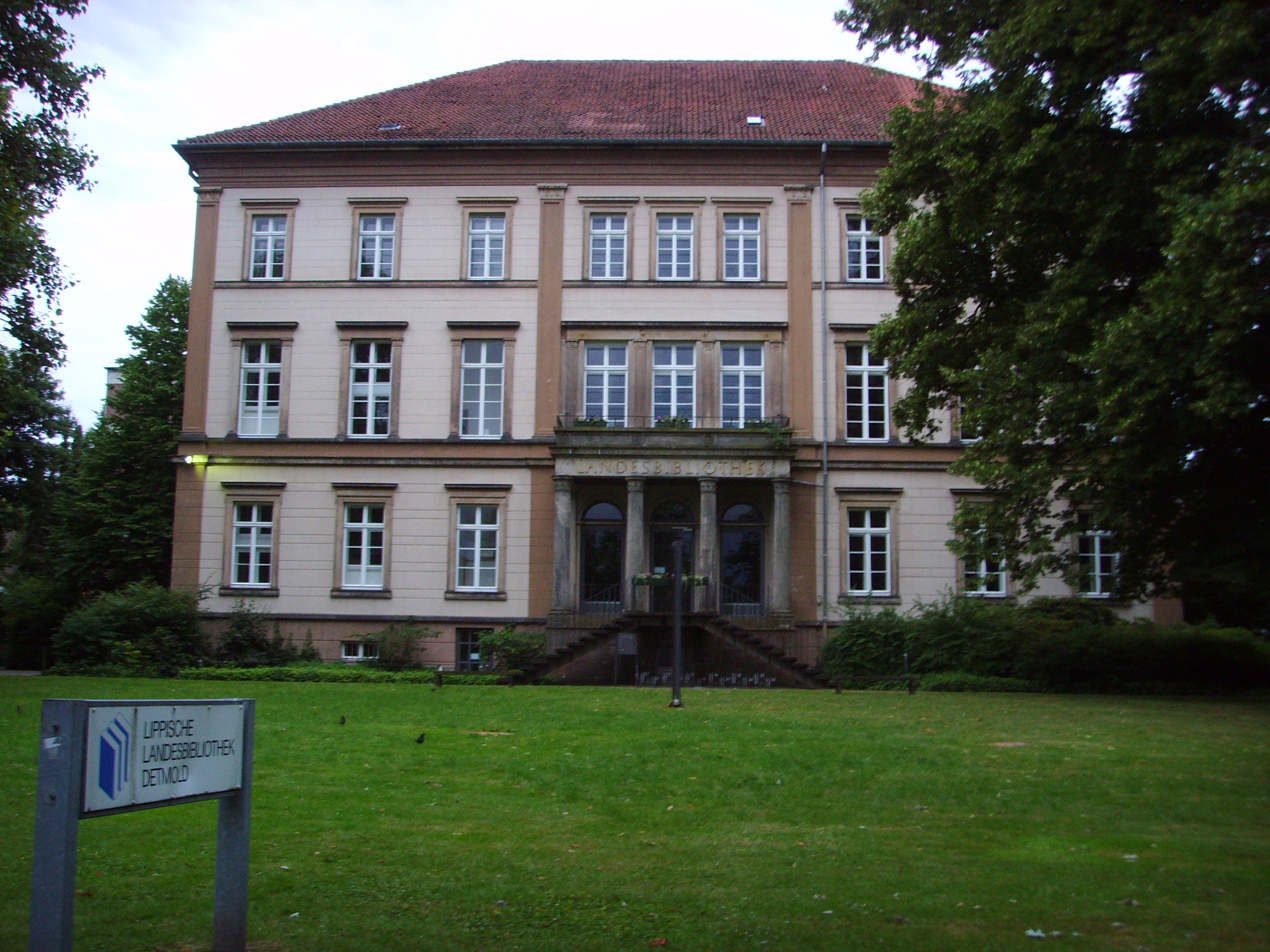
Library of Lippe Detmold

The people liked Pauline mainly because of her social institutions. The integrated charitable institutions were viewed as a model at home and abroad and were visited by foreign delegations, most of them British. Her care for the poor was evident. She relieved the famine in the years 1802 to 1804, by creating granaries. She was personally responsible for the softening the impact of military activities, such as quarterting and positioning of troops.

She was also responsible for the improvement of the infrastructure of the country. She built new roads and introduced street lighting in Detmold, using 26 oil lamps. She did not build any important monuments herself, but the construction of the neo-classical houses on the avenue in Detmold began during her reign. She initiated the merger in 1819 of several existing collections of books into a public library. Today's Lippe State Library at Detmold is a direct continuation of this library.

=== Vocational School ===
In the summer of 1798, Pauline had turned to the social tasks. There was great poverty in Lippe and the Princess accepted that this was due to a lack of education of the population. Many parents did not send their children to school out of economic necessity, instead letting the children work or beg. Simon Ernst Moritz Krücke, the inspector of the teacher seminary, was Pauline's closest advisor on social questions. He recommended the establishment of a vocational school; children should learn the theoretical knowledge but also practical skills. Leopold I agreed and the new school was opened in the orphanage at Bruchtor in Detmold. There, Krücke taught the children of poor people together with the orphans. Legally, the school became equivalent to an elementary school.

Some of the lesson was filled with practical work. Among the practical skills taught was knitting. The Princess visited knitting classes and gave small rewards to the children. The knitted goods were sold and the children received a part of the proceeds. This was meant to counter the objections of the parents, who would rather send their children to beg. A year later, the school was handed over to the country during a school festival. It was officially inaugurated on 28 June 1799. Sixty children who had not attended school before this school began, showed the knowledge and skills they had acquired in that year. Nevertheless, problems continued with parents who sent their children to the field in summer, to herd cattle or gather ears of corn, or sent them begging during the Christmas season. Economic conditions were harsh; the parents' income was never secure; the economy was evolving into a money economy and this made it difficult for them to do without the money earned by their children even seasonally.

=== Day care center ===
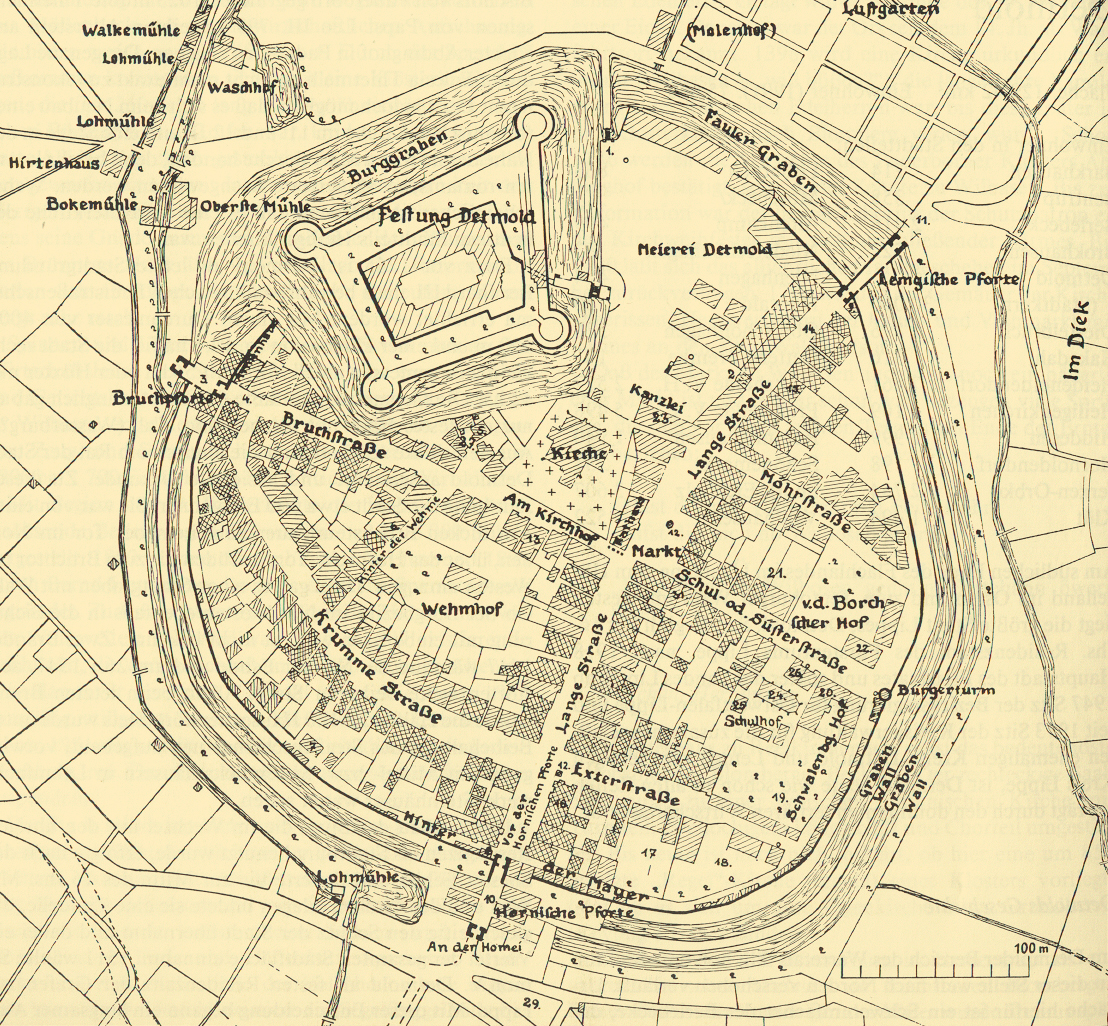
Map of Detmold around 1660

Pauline worried about the welfare of small children, whose parents had to leave the house for work during the day. She read in a Paris newspaper of an initiative by Joséphine de Beauharnais, the wife of Napoleon Bonaparte, who was still First Consul of France at that point in time. In Paris, however, only unmarried mothers were allowed to use the center, while in Detmold, the offering was also to married couples, if they both had to work. A circular from Princess Pauline Detmold ladies with the title German: Vorschlag eine Pariser Mode nach Detmold zu verpflanzen ("Proposal to transplant is a Parisian fashion to Detmold") is viewed as a starting point for the creation of a day care center:

Madame Bonaparte and several delicate and elegant ladies in the vast capital of the French Empire chose and built with truly feminine sister feeling and enviable refinement in the various neighborhoods of the big city, rooms where delicate youngsters, whose mothers are employed outside their homes, are being nurtured, fed, and calmed. Every morning blissful mothers bring their children; every night they take them home again with joy and gratitude, and the female founders of this mild institution alternately assume the supervision

— circular (quoted from Traute zur Lippe: Zur Geschichte der Paulinenanstalt in Detmold)

Pauline used the circular to find educated ladies willing to supervise the center one day each week, for free. The princely house would finance the center. Older girls from the vocational school and the orphanage would look after the children and be trained to care for them. In 1801, Pauline purchased a suitable building for the institution: the so-called "Schwalenberg Court" on Süsterstraße (now called Schülerstraße) in Detmold. The first day care center opened on 1 July 1802. The building was a three-story noble court; it was demolished at the end of the 19th century. The "Gymnasium Leopoldinum" (a secondary school, which still exists) developed from a school that was already housed in the building when Pauline bought it. The day care center was soon imitated all over Germany. The city of Detmold, however, saw the project as a royal hobby and provided no financial support.

Up to 20 children were cared for in the first years. They were required to have been weaned from their mother's breast of and no older than four years of age. Four-year-old children, it was believed, could stay at home alone or accompany their parents in the gardens or the fields, until they were old enough to go to the vocational school. The child-care institution was open from 24 June until late October when the harvest and garden work were completed.

Based on a report published by inspector Krücke in 1813, the center was open from 06:00 to 18:00 or 20:00. In the morning adolescent girls from the orphanage and older pupils from the vocational school would wash the children and put on a clean shirt and woolen jackets. On weekends, the clothing worn during the week was washed. The clothes were donated to the children when center closed at the end of the season. Pauline mostly financed the center using her own money, and the rest was paid out of the hospital fund. She managed to find twelve wealthy middle class women willing to act as supervisors. They had to record certain events in a journal, so that the princess was always well informed.

== Napoleon and Pauline ==
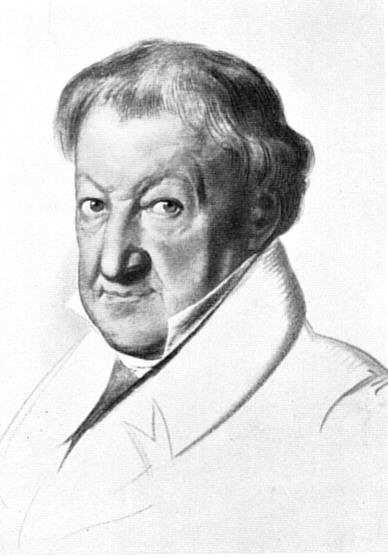
Karl Friedrich Reinhard

There are numerous indications that Pauline admired Napoleon. She was grateful for allowing Lippe to remain independent. Pauline was reinforced in her opinion by her correspondence with the highly educated diplomat Karl Friedrich Reinhard, who was in the service of France and was a friend of Goethe. Reinhard was an enthusiast for the French Revolution and was ambassador at the court of the Kingdom of Westphalia in Kassel. Until the end, Pauline believed in that Napoleon would win the war. The news of Napoleon's defeat in Russia could not change their beliefs. She was opposed to Lippe seceding from the Confederation of the Rhine and Lippe prosecuted soldiers who had deserted from Napoleon's army.

The Prussian lieutenant Haxthausen, who worked as a Russian diplomat, had behaved unduly toward her. She responded by having him locked up in the madhouse. He could only be released when Lippe was declared a hostile country after the Battle of Leipzig and was occupied by Prussian troops. The Prussian commander, Colonel von der Marwitz, described the incident in a letter to his wife and wrote about Pauline: The Princess-Regent is a rascal, and she has always served Napoleon faithfully [...].

== Confederation of the Rhine ==
The Confederation of the Rhine in 1808

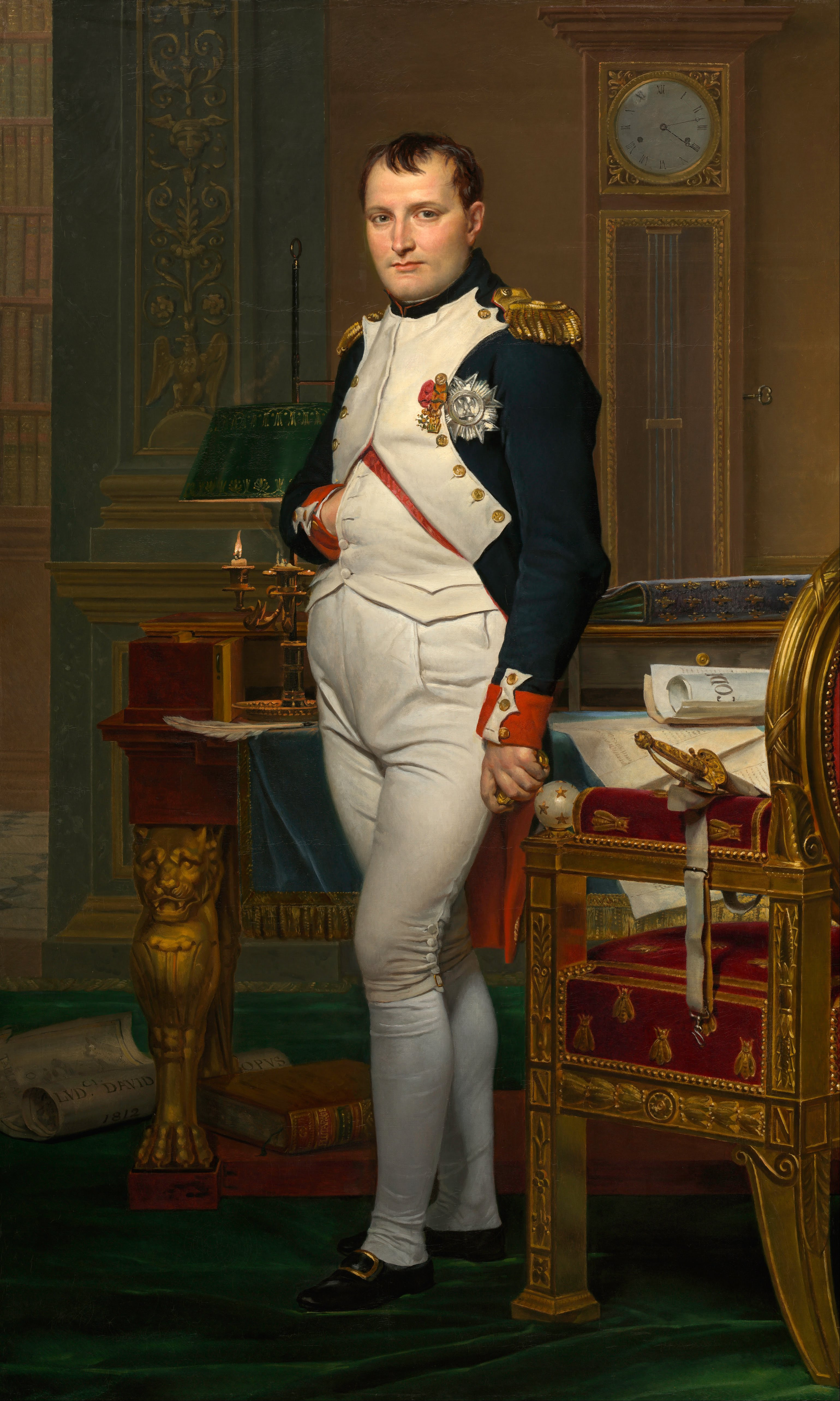
French Emperor Napoleon I

Next to Pauline's for social reform, the preservation of the Lippe's independence was her greatest foreign policy success. She felt obliged, as guardian, to act in her son's best interest and to keep his rights intact as far as possible. The small country was wedged between the warring powers France, Prussia and Hesse and under threat of being occupied by one or the other of its neighbors. At the beginning of her reign, Lippe was part of a neutral protection zone established by treaty, which all the warring parties respected. To ensure the neutrality, Prussian observation troops of there were stationed in Lippe. In 1806 Napoleon initiated the so-called Confederation of the Rhine. Prussia responded with the North German Confederation and solicited members. Pauline saw that Lippe's independence was threatened and sought to join the Confederation of the Rhine. Napoleon confirmed Lippe's affiliation with the Confederation on 18 April 1807 with a certificate, and Pauline traveled to Paris to negotiate some special arrangements for Lippe. She was known as an admirer of Napoleon, an attitude that earned her much criticism later. In justifying her decision, she stated that she preferred to submit to a distant France than to neighboring Hesse or Prussia.

The inclusion in the Confederation of the Rhine had the consequence that Lippe had to provide troops for Napoleon's army. The citizens of Lippe resisted and there were riots. Many young men evaded the recruitment or deserted during the French campaigns. After Napoleon's defeat in October 1813 in the Battle of Leipzig, the citizens of Lippe flogged the French officials in Lippe, to Pauline's dismay. Until then she had believed in Napoleon's victory. Lippe was occupied by the Prussians, who regarded it as a hostile country and as Pauline as a collaborator. As a result, Lippe resigned from the Confederation of the Rhine. Counsellor Preuss signed treaties of alliance with Austria and Russia on 29 November 1813. A Lippe volunteer corps was formed and was equipped by donations from Lippe citizens. Pauline invited her citizens to contribute and every gift, regardless of size, was published with the name of the donor in the newspaper of record.

That Lippe came out of the political disaster of 1813 intact, was due to the tendency of the rulers in Austria and Russia to restore the status quo ante. The South German members of the Confederation had been accepted as allies and it was felt that Lippe could not be treated differently.

After these, Pauline suffered a nervous breakdown from which she recovered only slowly. She therefore took no part in the Congress of Vienna 1814–15, when Europe was reorganized after the victory over Napoleon. Many small states disappeared from the map, but Lippe's sovereignty was confirmed at the Congress of Vienna. The last entry in the list of sovereign princes in the preamble of the constitution of the German Confederation of 8 July 1815 reads:

Her Highness the Princess of the Lippe as regent and guardian of the prince her son [...]

— preamble of the constitution of the German Confederation (quoted in Knittel:Heimatchronik des Kreises Lippe)

== Abolition of serfdom ==
On 27 December 1808, Princess Pauline issued a decree to abolish serfdom in Lippe, against the will of the Estates, who had been side-lined since 1805. The decree came into force on 1 January 1809. She followed the example of most other states from the Confederation of the Rhine. In the era after the French Revolution, serfdom was widely seen as a "relic of the Middle Ages", and firmly rejected.

In the preamble to the decree, the Princess Regent, explained her humanistic and, above all, economic motives. Her words were read from the pulpits and published through posters and printed in the Lippischen Intelligenzblättern:

Convinced that serfdom, even if it is as moderate as it has been so far in this country, will always have a negative influence on the morality and the diligence and solvency of the peasants, we find ourselves, as mother of the nation, and in the interest of the wealth of this class of faithful subjects, moved to follow the example of other member states of the Confederation and give up such a relationship, [...]

— Lippischen Intelligenzblättern (quoted in Bender: Fürstliche Großtat? Die Aufhebung der Leibeigenschaft in Lippe vor 200 Jahren)

The decree of 27 December 1808 abolished the Weinkauf and Sterbfall rules, which had been applied until then. The Weinkauf rule stipulated that when a serf sold his Kolonat (his right to use a certain parcel of land), a transfer fee had to be paid to the landlord. Under the Sterbfall rule, when a serf died, his heirs had to deliver his best set of clothes or his or the most valuable piece of cattle (the so-called Besthaupt to the landlord.

This Regulation initially affected only Paulines own serfs and their relatives. Within a short time, however, it was extended to the landed gentry, the landowners, the Church of Lippe and the wealthy citizens. This gave the Lippe farmers and their families a noticeable improvement of their previously modest social status. However, the Lippe variant of serfdom was by no means comparable with the Prussian or the Russian serfdom. It was only a mild obligation and its abolition posed no particular event and sparked no celebrations among those affected. The farmers were more hindered by the numerous banalities and payments in cash and in kind they were required to make, which would only be abolished by law in Lippe in the 1830.

== Constitutional dispute ==
The Estates were made up of representatives of the knighthood and the cities and convened each year at a Landtag in order to discuss the affairs of Lippe and to make decisions. With the membership of Lippe in the Confederation of the Rhine, these rights were suspended and the Princess was appointed to Sovereign. Pauline took her new authority to the mean that she would no longer need the consent of the Estates now:

I can not do it, although perhaps a fault of my strong character [...], to endure the pretensions and stabbings, the disrespectful tone, the eternal hindering of every good act which the Estates allow themselves year after year.

— Pauline, letters (quoted in doggerel:homeChronicle of Lippe)

Pauline did not resolved the Estates but largely ruled without them, like the absolutist Frederick Adolph a century earlier. Her relationship to the Estates had already been tarnished when the Estates refused the duty on spirits that she had proposed in 1805 to finance the asylum for the insane she was planning.

After the Confederation of the Rhine was dissolved, the Estates demanded their old rights be reinstated and it came to a bitter dispute with the Princely House.

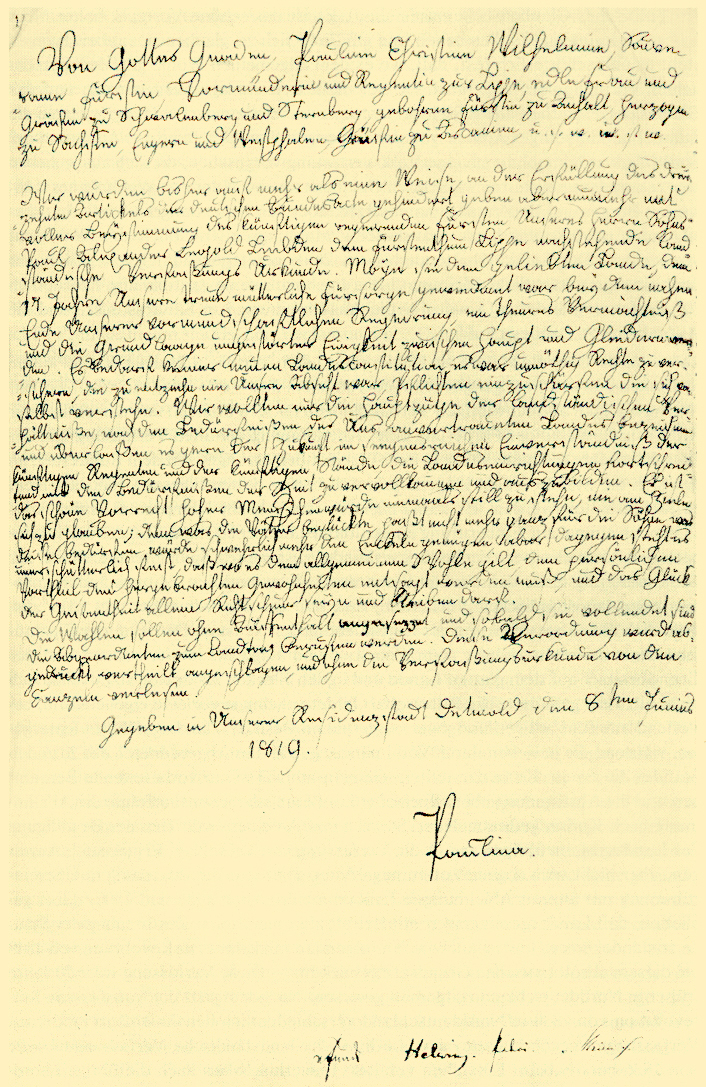
Draft constitution, handwritten by Princess Pauline in 1819

In the Vienna Final Act, the final document of the Congress of Vienna, paragraph 13 states: In all German states will a Constitution of the Estates will be established [...]. Pauline had a Constitution for Lippe drafted along the lines of some southern German states; she wrote the final version personally. This Constitution was adopted by the Government on 8 June 1819 and subsequently published under cheers of the population. The Estates protested against the restriction of their traditional rights and asked the Emperor to counter the Princess's subversive and the democratic spirit of the times. At the instigation of Metternich, the so-called Carlsbad Decrees were taken against democratic agitation. These coincided with the bitter confrontation about the Constitution in Lippe. The Federal Assembly of the German Confederation asked Pauline to immediately repeal the Constitution.

After Pauline's death, Leopold II and the Lippe government tried to maintain her Legacy, with the necessary changes. After long and difficult negotiations with the estates, including the nobility, this proved impossible. Eventually a compromise was found in which some of the ancient privileges of the nobility were restored. The new Constitution came into force in 1836.

== Resignation ==
Pauline was often disappointed by Leopold and believed she could not hand over government to him with clear conscience. She postponed the date of the transfer several times, until critical voices became too loud. Finally, she surprised her son by announcing her resignation on 3 July 1820. At first, Leopold needed her assistance in the affairs of government, but he made sure that this was not visible to outsiders. Pauline planned to end this situation by moving from Detmold to her widow seat Lippehof at Lemgo. However, before she could move, she died at Detmold on 29 December 1820 of a painful lung ulceration. She was buried in the Reformed Church at the market square in Detmold, today's Church of the Redeemer.

On 5 March 1822 an obituary of Pauline by Helmina von Chézy was published in the Dresdner Abendzeitung. It condemned her anti-Prussian policy and cited as an excuse:

Who is going to require a woman, even if she were an Empress, an independent, correct political view and steady action in matters of war?

— Helmina von Chézy, obituary in the Dresdner Abendzeitung (quoted by the Internet portal "Westphalian history"

== Reception ==
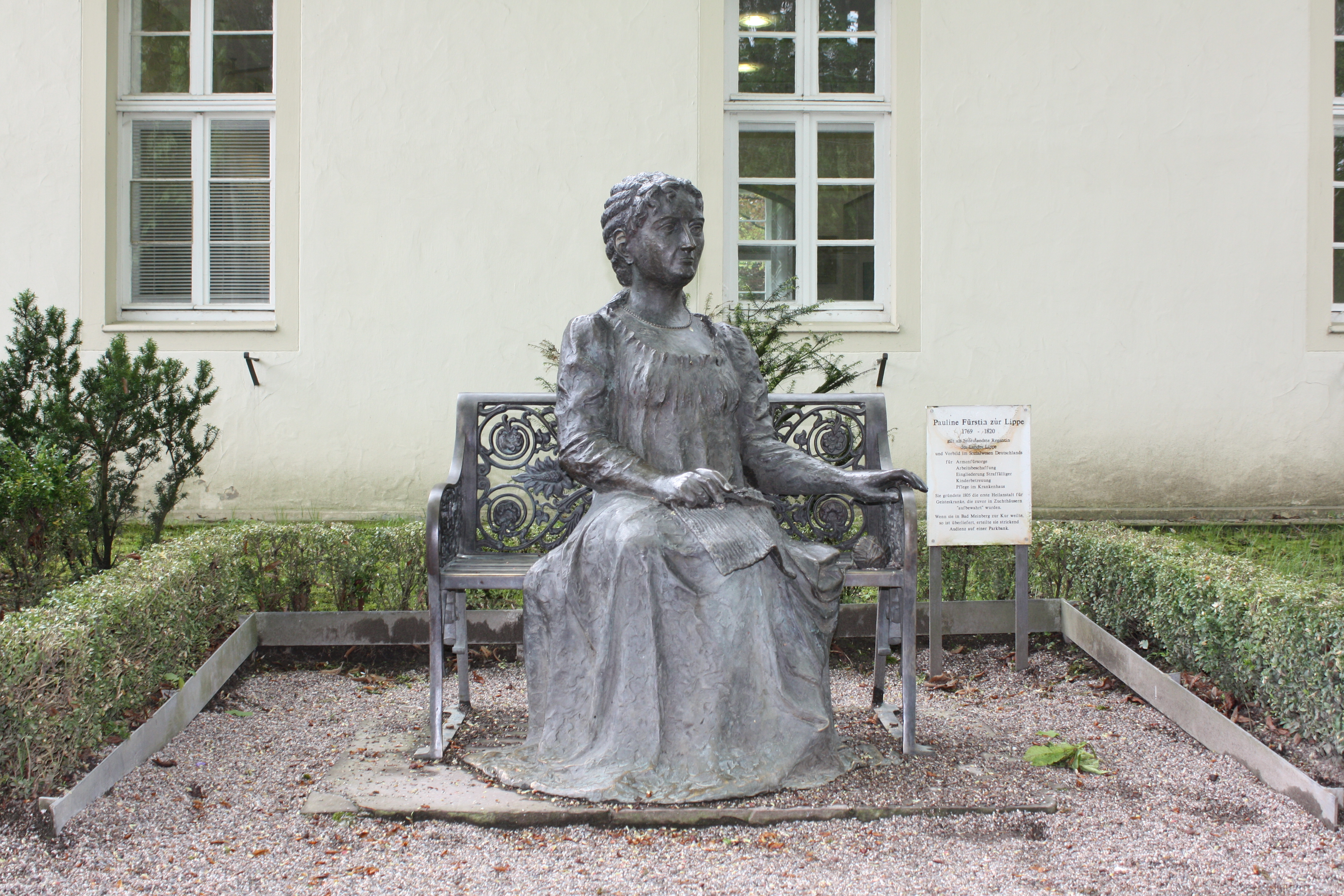
Pauline monument in Bad Meinberg

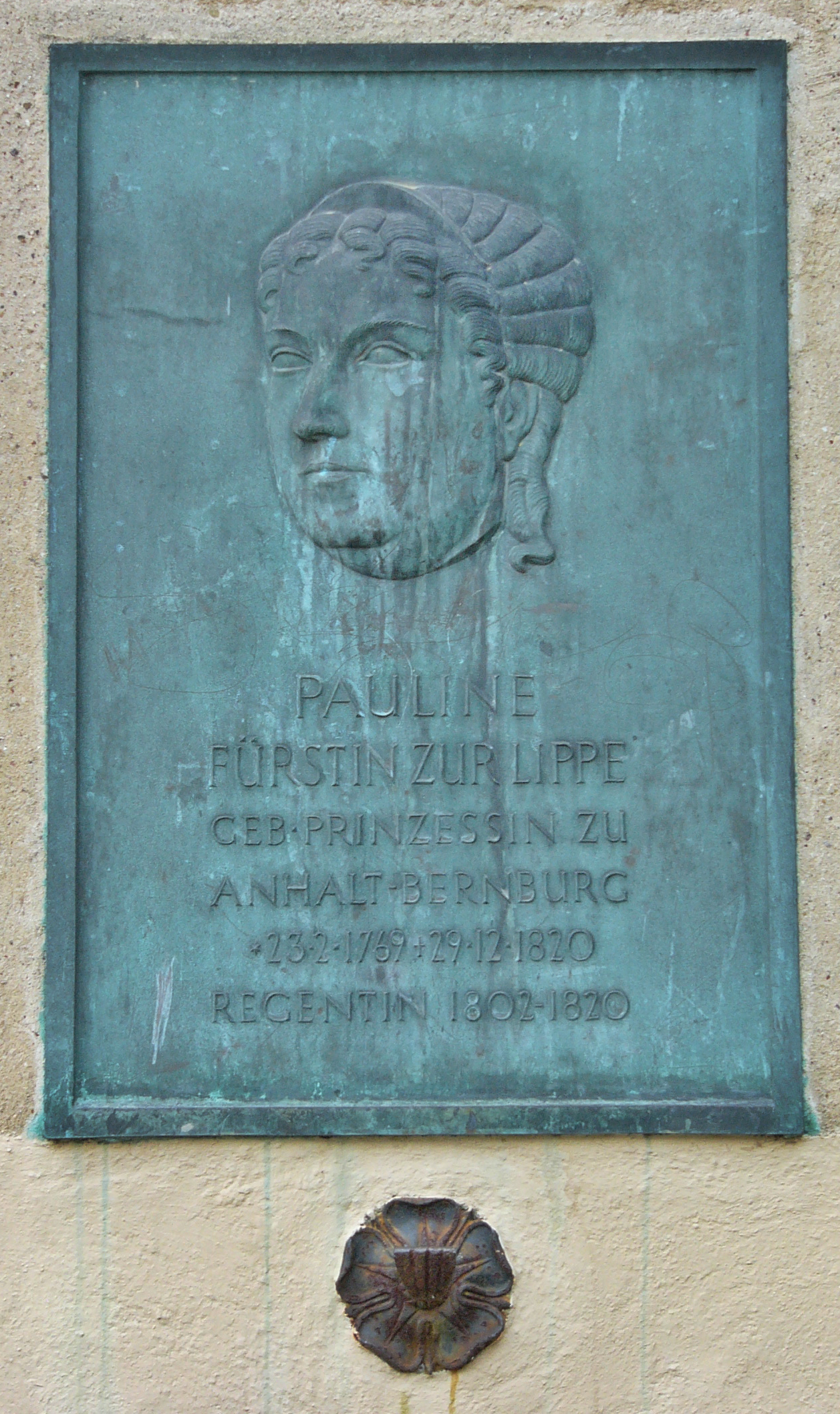
Memorial plaque on the Castle Square in Detmold

The historian Hans Kiewning wrote a biography of Pauline in the 1930s entitled: Princess Pauline of Lippe, 1769 to 1820. It is the most influential positive biography until today. Kiewning expressed his admiration for Pauline in the following words:

Additionally, there is little doubt that Pauline far surpassed all rulers of Lippe who came before or after her, and made a name for herself outside her country's borders during her lifetime more than any of them.

— Hans Kiewning

Pauline's personality, politics and reforms have been the subject of numerous studies and publications. The Lippe Bibliography lists some 170 titles are currently only about personal. Historical research in the second half of the 20th century began to question the uncritical historical view of Pauline. Elizabeth Stolle asked in her contribution to Lippischen Mitteilungen aus Geschichte und Landeskunde, 1969 questions about the Pauline's religious stance, in order to obtain a better understanding of her diaconal interests.

In a survey conducted by the Lippische Landeszeitung at the end of 2009, Princess Pauline was elected as the most significant figure in the history of Lippe, with 28 percent of the votes cast. Former state president Heinrich Drake finished second with 22 percent, the third place was tied between Arminius, winner of the Battle of Teutoburg Forest, and ex-Chancellor Gerhard Schröder, with 9 percent of the votes each.

Statues of Pauline can be found on the grounds of the Lindenhaus in Lemgo and in park of Bad Meinberg. A plaque is attached to a building at the Castle Square in Detmold. An association name Pauline's daughters, a mineral spring at Bad Salzuflen name Pauline spring, and a number of street names in several towns in Lippe, all remind us of the Princess. The Princess Pauline Foundation (German: Fürstin-Pauline-Stiftung, formerly the Paulinenanstalt) in Detmold still exists and focuses on assisting young people and the elderly. The foundation runs a number of day care centers and strives to help people in need in the spirit of the Princess.

== Issue ==
- Leopold II, Prince of Lippe (6 November 1796 – 1 January 1851)
- Prince Frederick (8 December 1797 – 20 October 1854)
- Princess Louise (17 July 1800 – 18 July 1800)

== Ancestry ==
Ancestors of Princess Pauline of Anhalt-Bernburg

8. Charles Frederick, Prince of Anhalt-Bernburg
4. Victor Frederick, Prince of Anhalt-Bernburg
9. Countess Sophie Albertine of Solms-Sonnenwalde
2. Frederick Albert, Prince of Anhalt-Bernburg
10. Margrave Albert Frederick of Brandenburg-Schwedt
5. Margravine Albertine of Brandenburg-Schwedt
11. Marie Dorothea of Courland
1. Princess Pauline of Anhalt-Bernburg
12. Prince Christian Charles of Schleswig-Holstein-Sonderburg-Plön-Norburg
6. Frederick Charles, Duke of Schleswig-Holstein-Sonderburg-Plön
13. Dorothea Christina of Aichelberg
3. Princess Louise Albertine of Schleswig-Holstein-Sonderburg-Plön
14. Christian Detlev von Reventlow
7. Christine Armgard von Reventlow
15. Benedicte Margrethe von Brockdorff

== References and Sources ==
- August Falkmann (1887). "Pauline" . Allgemeine Deutsche Biographie (in German). Vol. 25. Leipzig: Duncker & Humblot. pp. 275–277.
- Hans Adolf Dresel (1859), Die Fürstin Pauline zur Lippe und der General-Superintendent Weerth : Erinnerungsblätter, Lemgo & Detmold: Meyer
- Anonymous (1860), Erinnerungen aus dem Leben der Fürstin Pauline zur Lippe-Detmold: Aus den nachgelassenen Papieren eines ehemaligen Lippischen Staatsdieners, Gotha, also available via Google
- Elise Polko (1870), Eine deutsche Fürstin, Pauline zur Lippe, Leipzig
- Pauline of Lippe, Frederick Christian II of Schleswig-Holstein-Sonderburg-Augustenburg (1903), Briefe aus den Jahren 1790–1812, Leipzig: Paul Rachel
- Hans Kiewning (1930), Fürstin Pauline zur Lippe, 1769-1820, Detmold
- Hilde Kraemer (1969), Die Handbibliothek der Fürstin Pauline zur Lippe, Lippische Mitteilungen aus Geschichte und Landeskunde, vol. 38, Detmold
- Burkhard Meier (2002), Fürstin Pauline Stiftung, Von der ältesten Kinderbewahranstalt zum modernen Diakonieunternehmen, Detmold, ISBN 3-9807369-3-8
- Hermann Niebuhr (1990), Eine Fürstin unterwegs, Reisetagebücher der Fürstin Pauline zur Lippe 1799-1818, Detmold, ISBN 3-923384-10-6
- Jutta Prieur (2002), Frauenzimmer – Regentin – Reformerin. Fürstin Pauline zur Lippe 1802-1820, Sonderveröffentlichungen des Naturwissenschaftlichen und Historischen Vereins für das Land Lippe 69), Begleitband zur Ausstellung des NW Staatsarchivs Detmold (27. Oktober 2002 bis 2. Februar 2003), Detmold

Princess Pauline of Anhalt-Bernburg House of Ascania Born: 23 February 1769 Died: 29 December 1820
German royalty
Vacant Title last held by Christine Charlotte of Solms-Braunfels as Countess of Lippe-Detmold	Princess consort of Lippe; 2 January 1796 – 5 November 1802	Vacant Title next held by Emilie of Schwarzburg-Sondershausen
