= Frederica Henriette of Anhalt-Bernburg =

Friederica Henrietta von Anhalt-Bernburg
- Princess of Anhalt-Köthen
- Born: 24 January 1702; Bernburg, Anhalt-Bernburg, Holy Roman Empire
- Died: 4 April 1723 (aged 21); Köthen, Anhalt-Bernburg, Holy Roman Empire
- Spouse: Leopold, Prince of Anhalt-Köthen
- Issue: Gisela Agnes, Princess of Anhalt-Dessau
- House: Ascania
- Father: Charles Frederick, Prince of Anhalt-Bernburg
- Mother: Sophie Albertine of Solms-Sonnenwalde

Frederica Henriette of Anhalt-Bernburg (24 January 1702–4 April 1723) was a member of the House of Ascania and Princess of Anhalt-Bernburg by birth and a Princess of Anhalt-Köthen by marriage.

== Life ==
Frederica Henriette was born in Bernburg, Anhalt-Bernburg, Holy Roman Empire, as the fourth daughter and the youngest child of Charles Frederick, Prince of Anhalt-Bernburg and his first wife Sophie Albertine of Solms-Sonnenwalde.

In Bernburg on 11 December 1721 she married Leopold, Prince of Anhalt-Köthen and they had one daughter:

1. Gisela Agnes (b. Köthen, 21 September 1722 - d. Dessau, 20 April 1751), married on 25 May 1737 to Leopold II, Prince of Anhalt-Dessau.

Prince Leopold is famous for being the patron of the composer Johann Sebastian Bach. Unlike her husband, Frederica Henrietta had little interest in music. Moreover, Leopold had to contribute more and more to the Prussian military, leaving him with less money for music. The consequence of all this was the departure of Bach and his family to Leipzig in 1723. Bach blamed Frederica Henriette's lack of interest in music for his having to leave Köthen, although she was dead by the time he took up his post in Leipzig.

Frederica Henrietta suffered from "pulmonary weakness", and died in April 1723 aged 21 and was buried in St. Jakob, Köthen.

Frederica Henriette of Anhalt-Bernburg House of Ascania Born: 24 January 1702 Died: 4 April 1723
Preceded by Gisela Agnes of Rath	Princess consort of Anhalt-Köthen; 1721–1723	Succeeded by Charlotte Frederica of Nassau-Siegen
