= Princess Maria Leopoldine of Anhalt-Dessau =

German Princess from the Ascanian Family

Maria Leopoldine of Anhalt-Dessau
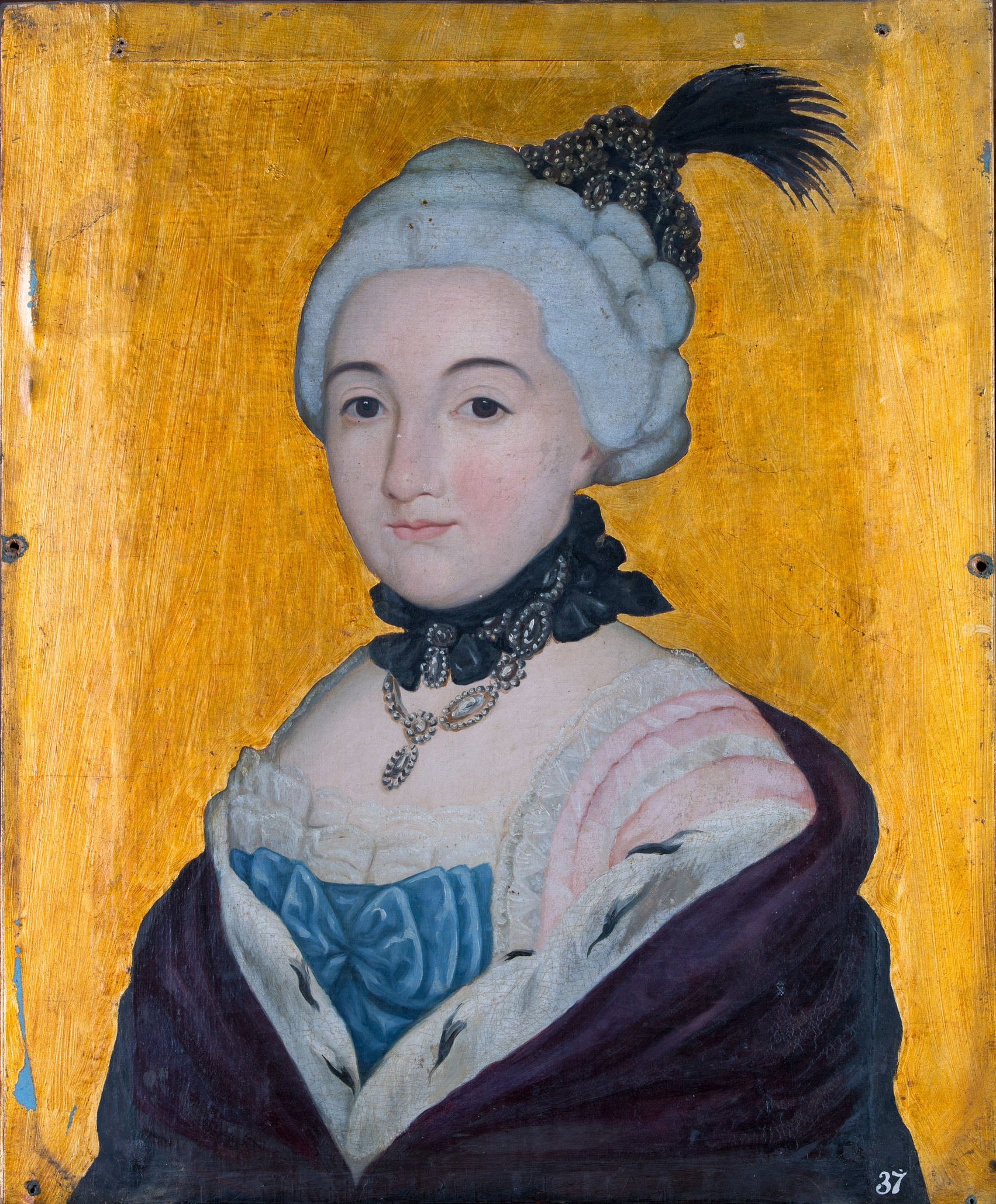
- Posthumous portrait
- Born: 18 November 1746; Dessau
- Died: 15 April 1769 (aged 22); Detmold
- Spouse: Simon August, Count of Lippe-Detmold
- Issue: Leopold I, Prince of Lippe
- House: Ascania
- Father: Leopold II, Prince of Anhalt-Dessau
- Mother: Gisela Agnes of Anhalt-Köthen

Marie Leopoldine of Anhalt-Dessau (18 November 1746 – 15 April 1769) was a princess of Anhalt-Dessau by birth and by marriage Countess of Lippe-Detmold.

== Life ==
Leopoldine Marie was a daughter of Prince Leopold II of Anhalt-Dessau from his marriage to Gisela Agnes, daughter of Prince Leopold of Anhalt-Köthen. She had a particularly close relationship with her sisters Agnes and Casimire, with whom she mostly lived together, even after her marriage, and with whom she conducted an extensive correspondence when they were not together.

At age 18, on 28 September 1765 in Dessau, she married Count Simon August of Lippe-Detmold, who was twice as old as she was. In her letters to her sisters, she complained about being homesick, so her sisters decided to follow her to Detmold. She personally oversaw the modernizing of the princely residence Detmold Castle and the Court at Lemgo.

She died on 15 April 1769, only four years after her marriage. Later that year, Simon August married her sister Casimire.

== Issue ==
From her marriage with Simon August, Marie Leopoldine had one son:

- Leopold I (1767–1802), Prince of Lippe-Detmold, married in 1796 princess Pauline Christine of Anhalt-Bernburg (1769–1820)

== Sources ==
- Eva Labouvie: Schwestern und Freundinnen: zur Kulturgeschichte weiblicher Kommunikation, Böhlau Verlag, Cologne / Weimar, 2009, p. 321 ff
