= Princess Gisela Agnes of Anhalt-Köthen =

Princess consort of Anhalt-Dessau (1722–1751)

Gisela Agnes of Anhalt-Köthen
- Princess consort of Anhalt-Dessau
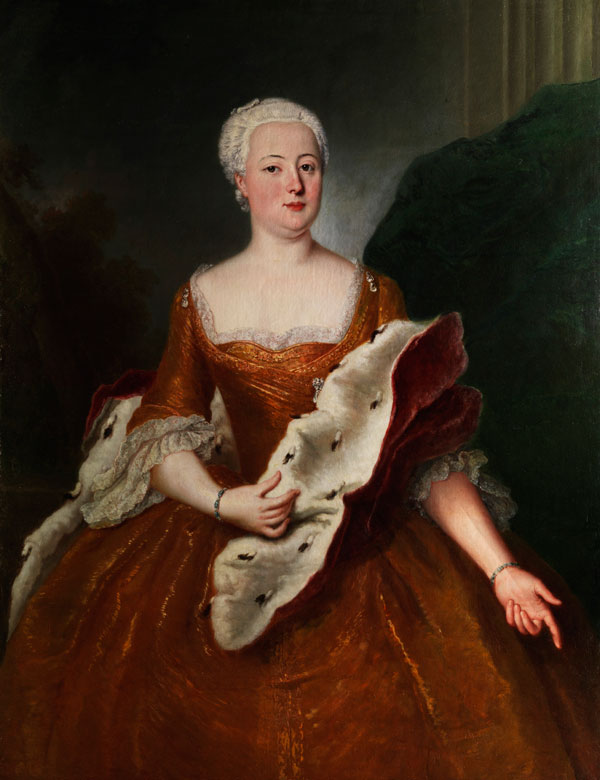
- Born: 21 September 1722; Köthen
- Died: 20 April 1751 (aged 28); Dessau
- Spouse: Leopold II, Prince of Anhalt-Dessau
- Issue: Leopold III, Duke of Anhalt-Dessau; Louise; Agnes, Freifrau von Loën; Henrietta Catherine Agnes of Anhalt-Dessau; Marie Leopoldine, Countess of Lippe-Detmold; John George; Casimire, Countess of Lippe-Detmold; Albert
- House: Ascania
- Father: Leopold, Prince of Anhalt-Köthen
- Mother: Frederica Henriette of Anhalt-Bernburg

Gisela Agnes of Anhalt-Köthen (21 September 1722, Köthen – 20 April 1751, Dessau) was a princess of Anhalt-Köthen by birth and by marriage Duchess of Anhalt-Dessau.

== Life ==
Gisela Agnes was the only surviving child of Prince Leopold of Anhalt-Köthen from his first marriage to Friederike Henriette, daughter of Prince Charles Frederick of Anhalt-Bernburg.

When her father died without leaving a male heir, he was succeeded as Prince of Anhalt-Köthen by her uncle Augustus Louis of Anhalt-Köthen. However, Gisela Agnes claimed her allodial title and took the case to the Reichskammergericht. Prince John Augustus of Anhalt-Zerbst mediated and a compromise was reached. Gisela was compensated with 100000taler plus and annual pension until her marriage. She also received her father's collection of guns and coins and another 32000taler for the estates of Prosigk, Klepzig and Köthen.

She married her cousin, Prince Leopold II Maximilian of Anhalt-Dessau, on 25 May 1737 in Bernburg. The marriage was described as very happy. The death of his wife hit Leopold II so hard that he, already in delicate health, died only eight months later. She was buried in St. Mary's Church in Dessau.

== Issue ==
From her marriage with Leopold II Maximilian, Gisela Agnes had the following children:

- Leopold III Frederick Francis (1740–1817), Prince of Anhalt-Dessau

married in 1767 princess Henriette Louise of Brandenburg-Schwedt (1750–1811)

- Louise (1742–1743)
- Henriette Catherine Agnes (1744–1799)

married in 1779 with Baron John Jost of Loën (1737–1803)

- Maria Leopoldine (1746–1769)

married 1765 Prince Simon August of Lippe-Detmold (1727–1782)

- John George (1748–1811)
- Casimire (1749–1778)

married in 1769 the Prince Simon August of Lippe-Detmold (1727–1782), the widow of her sister Maria Leopoldine

- Albert Frederick (1750–1811)

married in 1774 Countess Henriette of Lippe-Weissenfeld (1753–1795)

== Sources ==
- Ferdinand Siebigk: Das Herzogthum Anhalt, Desbarats, 1867, p. 227 ff.
- Gerhard Heine: Geschichte des Landes Anhalt und seiner Fürsten, Heine, 1866, p. 186
