= Simon Henry Adolph, Count of Lippe-Detmold =

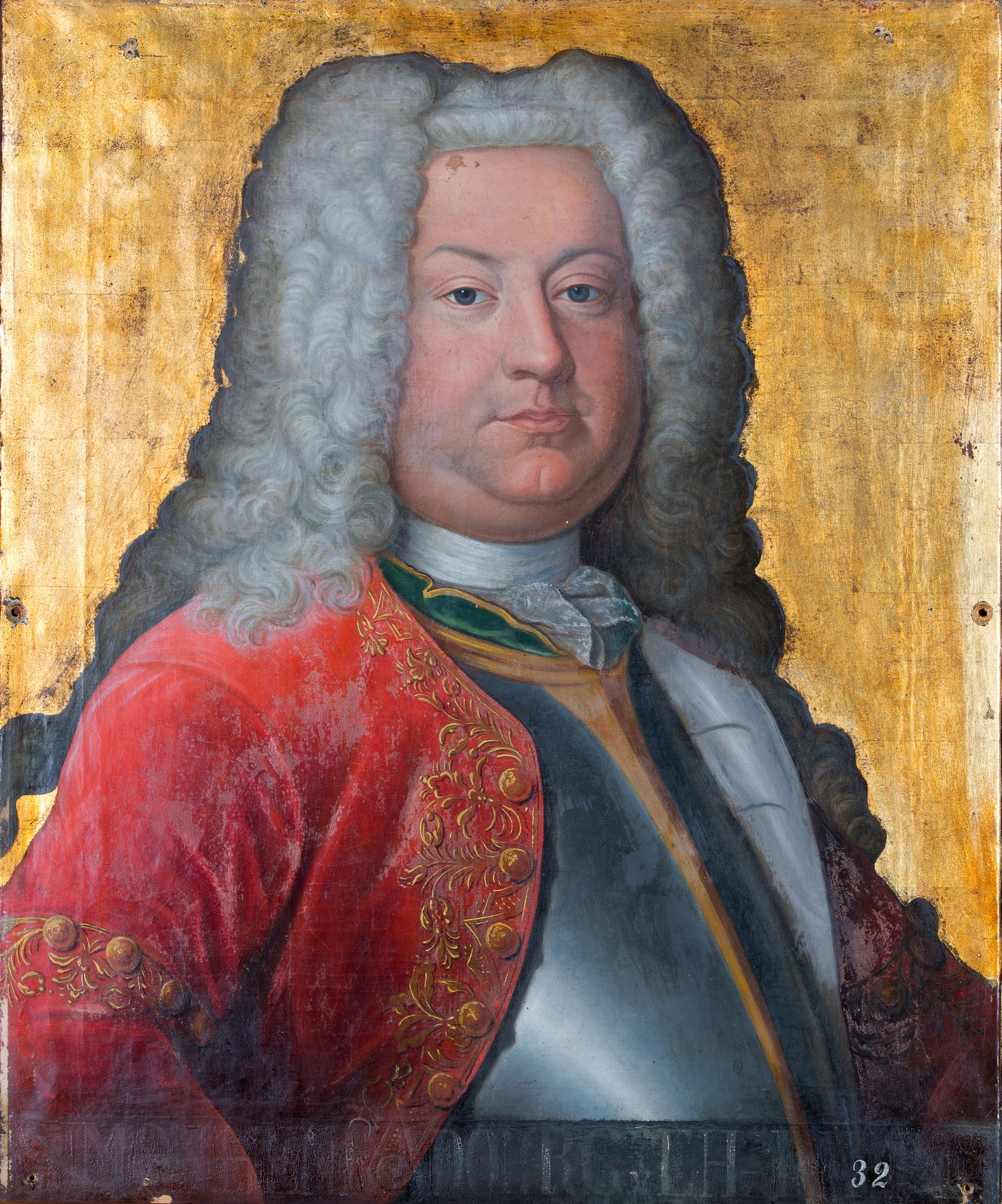
- Portrait made during the reign of Woldemar, Prince of Lippe
- Born: 25 January 1694
- Died: 12 October 1734 (aged 40)
- Noble family: House of Lippe
- Spouse: Johanna Wilhelmina of Nassau-Idstein
- Issue: Simon August, Count of Lippe-Detmold
- Father: Frederick Adolphus, Count of Lippe-Detmold
- Mother: Johanna Elisabeth of Nassau-Dillenburg

Simon Henry Adolph, Count of Lippe-Detmold (25 January 1694 – 12 October 1734) was a ruler of the county of Lippe.

== Life ==
He was the son of Frederick Adolphus, Count of Lippe-Detmold and his wife Johanna Elisabeth of Nassau-Dillenburg. His five siblings all died young, of his seven step-siblings, only three sisters lived into adulthood:

- Amalia 1701–1754 abbess of Cappel Abbey in Lippstadt and St. Mary's Abbey in Lemgo
- Franziska 1704–1733, married to Count Frederick Charles of Bentheim-Steinfurt
- Friederike Adolphine, 1711–1769 married to Count Frederick Alexander of Detmold

His Grand Tour under the supervision of the Lord Chamberlain in 1710 took him to the University of Utrecht and to the courts of England and France. During the Austro-Turkish War of 1716–1718, he took part in the campaign of Prince Eugene of Savoy in Hungary and Belgrade, and later returned via Vienna to Detmold, where he took up government 1718.

Simon Henry Adolph is famous for the fact that in 1720 Emperor Charles VI offered to raise him to Imperial Prince for a mere 4400 talers, but Simon Henry Adolph found himself unable to raise the money. A chronic shortage of money forced him to sell the Dutch lordships of Vianen and Ameide in 1725, and to pledge Sternberg Castle to the Electorate of Hanover in 1733.

Historians judge that he loved pomp and circumstance as much as his father did. Although he was constantly in financial difficulties, he wasted money on parties as if he had an inexhaustible source of money, or so an expert on Lippe history says 200 years later. Mayor Möller of Lippstadt voiced quite a different opinion on 1784, praising Simon Henry Adolph for improving the state of the principality's economy and eradicating the high debt, some of which were caused by the Thirty Years' War, and some by his charitable generosity, and some by his providing care and a suitable education to all branches of his family, not by taxation and oppression of his subjects, but by borrowing and selling off his Dutch possessions in 1725, and by mortgaging Sternberg in 1733. According to Möller, Simon Henry Adolph brought balance to the state's financial situation with his frugal policies, and he used extraordinary care to ensure the welfare of his country, vigorously promoted religion, morality, justice and prosperity for all his subjects.

== Marriage and issue ==
On 16 October 1719 Simon Henry Adolph married princess Johanna Wilhelmina, daughter of Prince George August of Nassau-Idstein. Of her eleven children, four died young and three daughters remained unmarried:

- Charles August, (born: 3 November 1723 in Detmold; died: 16 February 1724 in Detmold)
- Charles Frederick Simon, (born: 31 March 1726 in Detmold; died: 18 February 1727 in Detmold)
- Simon August, Count of Lippe-Detmold, born: 12 June 1727 in Detmold; died: 1 May 1782 in Detmold)
- Frederick Adolph (born: 30 August 1728 in Detmold; died 8 August 1729 in Detmold)
- Louis Henry Adolph (born: 7 March 1732 in Detmold; died: 31 August 1800 in Lemgo)
  - married firstly in 1767 Anna of Hesse-Philippsthal-Barchfeld (born: 14 December 1735; died: 7 January 1785), daughter of Landgrave William of Hesse-Philippsthal-Barchfeld
  - married secondly in 1786 with Louise of Isenburg-Büdingen-Birstein (born: 10 December 1764; died: 24 September 1844)
- Emil George (born: 12 March 1733 in Detmold; died: 8 July 1733 in Detmold)
- August William Ernest Albert, (born: 11 January 1735 in Detmold; died: 23 January 1791 in Brake)
  - married in 1773 Countess Wilhelmina of Trotha (born: 14 February 1740; died: 26 February 1793)
- Elisabeth Henriette Amalia (born: 10 February 1721 in Detmold, died: 19 January 1793 in Brake), abbess of Cappel Abbey in Lippstadt and St. Mary's Abbey in Lemgo, 1751
- Louise Friederike (born: 3 October 1722 in Detmold; died: 3 November 1777 in Brake)
- Henriette Auguste (born: 26 March 1725 in Detmold; died: 5 August 1777 in Norburg)
  - married on 19 June 1745 Duke Frederick of Schleswig-Holstein-Glücksburg (born: 1 April 1701; died: 27 November 1766), grandson of Christian, Duke of Saxe-Eisenberg
- Charlotte Clementine, abbess, (born: 11 November 1730 in Detmold; died: 18 May 1804 at Brake Castle)

Simon Henry Adolph, Count of Lippe-Detmold House of Lippe Born: 25 January 1694 Died: 12 October 1734
Preceded by Frederick Adolphus	Count of Lippe; 1718–1734	Succeeded by Simon August
