= Leopold II of Anhalt-Dessau =

Prince of Anhalt-Dessau (1700–1751)

Leopold II
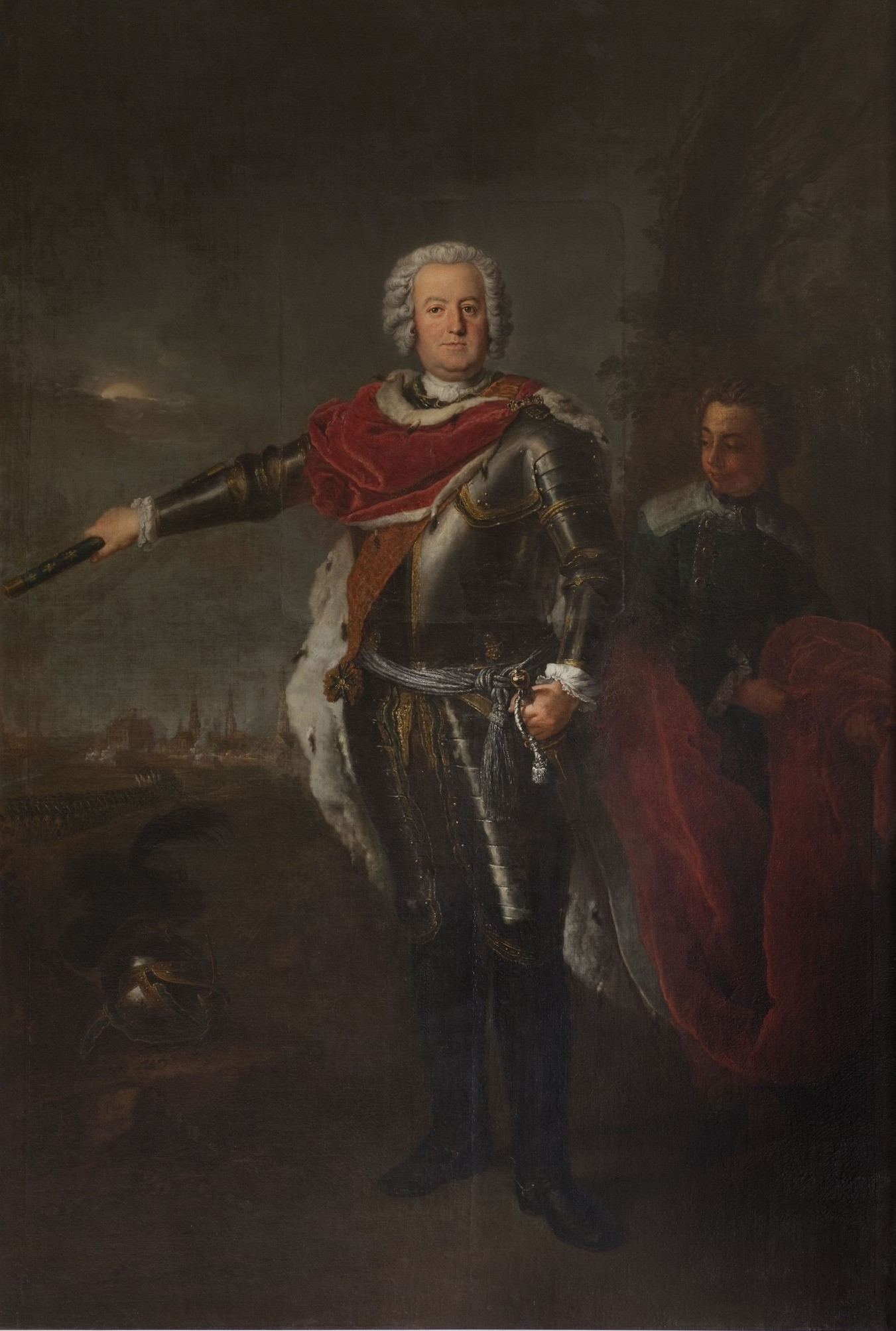
- Portrait of Leopold II by Antoine Pesne, 1748

Prince of Anhalt-Dessau
- Reign: 1747–1751
- Predecessor: Leopold I
- Successor: Leopold III
- Born: 25 December 1700; Dessau
- Died: 16 December 1751 (aged 50); Dessau
- Spouse: Gisela Agnes of Anhalt-Köthen
- Issue: Leopold III, Duke of Anhalt-Dessau; Louise; Agnes, Freifrau von Loën; Henrietta Catherine Agnes of Anhalt-Dessau; Marie Leopoldine, Countess of Lippe-Detmold; John George; Casimire, Countess of Lippe-Detmold; Albert
Names
- Leopold Maximilian
- House: Ascania
- Father: Leopold I, Prince of Anhalt-Dessau
- Mother: Anna Louise Föhse

Leopold II Maximilian, Prince of Anhalt-Dessau (25 December 1700 – 16 December 1751), was a German prince of the House of Ascania and ruler of the principality of Anhalt-Dessau from 1747 to 1751; he also was a Prussian general.

== Life ==
Leopold was born at Dessau as the second son of Leopold I, Prince of Anhalt-Dessau, by his morganatic wife Anna Louise Föhse.

At only nine years of age, he accompanied his father on his military duties for the Prussian army. In 1715 he was appointed Lieutenant Colonel-in-Chief of the Infantry Regiment No. 27 of Stendal. In 1733 he led the Prussian forces stationed in the city of Mühlhausen in Thuringia during the First Silesian War.

The death in 1737 of his elder brother, the Hereditary Prince William Gustav, made Leopold the new heir of Dessau. The late prince was already married and had nine children, but his wife was of non-noble birth; for this reason, the issue of the marriage was barred from succession. After the death of his father in 1747, Leopold inherited Anhalt-Dessau.

Leopold was one of the best subordinate generals who served under Frederick the Great of Prussia. He distinguished himself in the capture of Glogau in 1741 and at the battles of Mollwitz, Chotusitz (where he was made Generalfeldmarschall on the field of battle), Hohenfriedberg, and Soor.

He died at Dessau in 1751. In 1752 Frederick the Great named a newly founded village Leopoldshagen (est. 1748) in his honour.

== Marriage and issue ==
In Bernburg on 25 May 1737 Leopold married Gisela Agnes (b. Köthen, 21 September 1722 – d. Dessau, 20 April 1751), daughter of Leopold, Prince of Anhalt-Köthen. They had seven children:

1. Leopold III Frederick Franz, Prince and (from 1807) Duke of Anhalt-Dessau (b. Dessau, 10 August 1740 – d. Luisium bei Dessau, 9 August 1817).
2. Louise Agnes Margarete (b. Dessau, 15 August 1742 – d. Dessau, 11 July 1743).
3. Henrietta Katharina Agnes (b. Dessau, 5 June 1744 – d. Dessau, 15 December 1799), married on 26 October 1779 to John Justus, Freiherr von Loën.
4. Marie Leopoldine (b. Dessau, 18 November 1746 – d. Detmold, 15 April 1769), married on 4 August 1765 to Simon August, Count of Lippe-Detmold.
5. John George (b. Dessau, 28 January 1748 – d. Vienna, 1 April 1811).
6. Casimire (b. Dessau, 19 January 1749 – d. Detmold, 8 November 1778), married on 9 November 1769 to Simon August, Count of Lippe-Detmold, widow of her sister.
7. Albert Frederick (b. Dessau, 22 April 1750 – d. Dessau, 31 October 1811), married on 25 October 1774 to Countess Henriette of Lippe-Weissenfeld, great-granddaughter of Jobst Herman, Count of Lippe; the union was childless (Albert Frederick had an illegitimate son by one Anna Luise Franke: Gustav Adolf von Heideck).

== Sources ==
- Siebigk (1883). "Leopold II". Allgemeine Deutsche Biographie. 18. Leipzig: Duncker & Humblot: 352–356.

Leopold II of Anhalt-Dessau House of Ascania Born: 25 December 1700 Died: 16 December 1751
Regnal titles
Preceded by Leopold I	Prince of Anhalt-Dessau; 1747–1751	Succeeded by Leopold III
