= Simon August, Count of Lippe-Detmold =

German count (1727–1782)

Simon August
- Prince of Lippe-Detmold
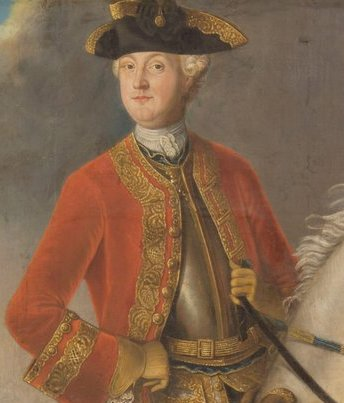
- Detail from an 18th-century portrait
- Born: 12 June 1727; Detmold
- Died: 1 May 1782 (aged 54); Detmold
- Noble family: Lippe
- Spouses: Princess Polyxena Louise of Nassau-Weilburg; Princess Maria Leopoldine of Anhalt-Dessau; Princess Casimire of Anhalt-Dessau; Princess Christine of Solms-Braunfels
- Issue: Leopold I, Prince of Lippe
- Father: Simon Henry Adolph, Count of Lippe-Detmold
- Mother: Johanna Wilhelmine of Nassau-Idstein

Simon August, Count of Lippe (12 June 1727 – 1 May 1782), ruled the Principality of Lippe-Detmold from 1734 until 1782.

He was born in Detmold, the son of Simon Henry Adolph and Johanna Wilhelmine of Nassau-Idstein. Simon August ruled until 1747 under the guardianship of his mother. Under the influence of the Enlightenment, he issued a fiscal and social legislation and in 1749 he introduced, together with Adolf von Hillensberg, a budget in Lippe, so as to not spend money when no revenues were available. The Sparkasse Detmold and a fire insurance company are direct continuations of companies he founded. He acquired a salt mine at Bad Salzuflen and built a spa in Bad Meinberg. In 1775, he created a relief fund for the poor. A census in 1776 revealed that his country had 49416 inhabitants.

== Marriages and Issue ==
In Kirchheimbolanden on 24 August 1750, Simon August married firstly with princess Polyxena Louise (Kirchheimbolanden, 27 January 1733 – Detmold, 27 September 1764), daughter of Charles August, Prince of Nassau-Weilburg. They had a daughter:

- Wilhelmine Caroline (Kirchheimbolanden, 6 July 1751 – Kirchheimbolanden, 4 April 1753).

In Dessau on 28 September 1765 Simon August married secondly with princess Maria Leopoldine of Anhalt-Dessau (Dessau, 18 November 1746 – Detmold, 15 April 1769). They had a son:

- Frederick Wilhelm Leopold I (Detmold, 2 December 1767 – Detmold, 4 April 1802), Prince of Lippe.

In Dessau on 9 November 1769 Simon August married thirdly princess Casimire of Anhalt-Dessau (Dessau, 19 January 1749 – Detmold, 8 November 1778), sister of his previous wife. They had a son:

- Casimir August (Detmold, 9 October 1777 – Falkenberg bei Berlin, 27 May 1809).

In Braunfels Castle on 26 March 1780 Simon August married fourthly princess Christine of Solms-Braunfels (Braunfels, 30 August 1744 – Detmold, 16 December 1823). They had no children

After his death at Detmold in 1782, his son Leopold I took up government.

Simon August, Count of Lippe-Detmold House of Lippe Born: 12 June 1727 Died: 1 May 1782
German royalty
Preceded by Simon Henry Adolph	Prince of Lippe; 1734–1782	Succeeded by Leopold I as Prince of Lippe
