= Johanna Sophia Herre =

Johanna Sophia Herre (8 July 1706 – 5 June 1796), was the morganatic wife of William Gustav, Hereditary Prince of Dessau, and later Imperial Countess (German: Reichsgräfin) of Anhalt.

== Life ==
=== Origins ===
On her mother's side, Johanna Sophia Herre comes from a long-established and wealthy family of merchants and pharmacists. Her mother, Katharina Dorothea Starke (died 1767), was the daughter of the respected Rector of the Dessau Latin school. Her father, Christian Herre (1646–1720), formerly Mayor of Jeßnitz —he had acquired his fortune as a merchant and heir from a previous marriage– continued his successful business after his second marriage with Katharina Dorothea Starke in 1691.

Johanna Sophia Herre had four siblings, one younger sister and three older brothers, of whom two were officers in Prussian service and the youngest was Provost in Wörlitz.

=== Marriage and issue ===
How and where Johanna Sophia Herre and William Gustav, Hereditary Prince of Anhalt-Dessau met is unknown; however, the two were distantly related: they shared a common great-grandmother, Eleonora Blandina Schulze (1621–1696), who was married successively to the pharmacists Dominicus Starke (Johanna Sophia Herre's great-grandfather) and Christoph Föhse (William Gustav's great-grandfather). The mother of the Hereditary Prince was a Dessau pharmacist's daughter, Anna Louise Föhse, firstly morganatic wife of Leopold I, Prince of Anhalt-Dessau and later ennobled as Imperial Princess (German: Reichsfürstin). Although Dessau was the main residence of the princely family, only a few thousand people lived there at the beginning of the 18th century. In this small town, their parents' homes were only 300 meters apart.

William Gustav and Johanna Sophia Herre were married on 14 March 1726. The secret wedding took place at night in Dessau with only the couple, the Pastor Hoffmeister from Raguhn (who performed the ceremony) and Johanna Sophia Herre's grandmother, Anna Elisabeth Starke, were present. The young couple kept the wedding secret. Nevertheless, Johanna Sophia Herre moved into an apartment in Hornburg, near the place of employment of her husband, who served as an officer in the Prussian army.

In the summer of 1727, shortly after the birth of their first child, William, the small family moved to Gut Kleckewitz, where Johanna Sophia Herre spent the next two decades in virtual seclusion. The Hereditary Prince, to whom Gut Kleckewitz had been given to use by his father, visited her regularly, but continued to live in the court of Dessau or its garrison. Johanna Sophia Herre and her children had no official contact with the Dessau court or the princely family during these years. In the course of eleven years of marriage, they had nine children:

1. William (Hornburg, 15 March 1727 – killed in action at Torgau, 3 November 1760), a Prussian lieutenant-colonel.
2. Leopold Louis (b. Kleckewitz, 28 February 1729 – Liegnitz, 28 April 1795), a Prussian general and bearer of the Order of the Black Eagle; married on 1 November 1763 to Karoline Elisabeth Antoinette von Printzen.
3. Gustav (Kleckewitz, 26 May 1730 – killed in action at Breslau, 22 November 1757), a grenadier captain.
4. Johanna Sophia (Kleckewitz, 9 July 1731 – Dessau, 15 July 1786), Abbess of Mosigkau.
5. Frederick (Kleckewitz, 21 May 1732 – St. Petersburg, 2 June 1794), General Adjutant of the Empress Catherine II the Great of Russia.
6. Wilhelmine (Kleckewitz, 12 February 1734 – Bosfeld, 4 June 1781), married on 8 April 1772 to August Wolfrath von Campen, illegitimate son of Albert Wolfgang, Count of Schaumburg-Lippe.
7. Albert (Kleckewitz, 24 June 1735 – Dessau, 26 April 1802), a Prussian major-general; married on 24 June 1764 to Sophie Luise Henriette von Wedel.
8. Henry (Kleckewitz, 4 September 1736 – Dresden, 14 September 1758), a Prussian captain.
9. Leopoldine Anna (posthumously, Kleckewitz, 26 January 1738 – Berlin, 26 September 1808), married on 10 November 1773 to George Dietrich von Pfuhl.

The constantly growing family made their living from the private fortune of William Gustav and the income from Gut Kleckewitz as well as his position as a Prussian officer. All nine children from this marriage were identified in the baptismal registers as legitimate children of the Hereditary Prince and his wife. Although William Gustav had already committed himself to his wife and children in a will in 1734 and appointed the latter as his heirs, this will was also kept secret. Despite his apparent happy married life, the Hereditary Prince sired two sons in 1732 and 1734 from his relationship with Henriette Marianne Schardius, daughter of the Superintendent of Dessau.

=== Death of the Hereditary Prince and first years of widowhood ===
In December 1737 William Gustav became infected with smallpox. Despite the risk of infection, Johanna Sophia Herre (at that time heavily pregnant) visited her husband secretly at his sick bed. In the face of his fatal illness, he revealed his secret marriage and paternity to his brother Maurice. Two days later, on 16 December 1737, the Hereditary Prince of Anhalt-Dessau died. His wife and children spent the day at Gut Kleckewitz.

William Gustav was buried on 16 January 1738 as the officially unmarried Hereditary Prince of Anhalt-Dessau; neither his secret widow nor children attended the ceremony.

When the will of 1734 was opened, Prince Leopold I of Anhalt-Dessau undertook to take care of his eldest son's family. All children were excluded from the Anhalt-Dessau succession. Under the condition that they would continue to live inconspicuously at Gut Kleckewitz, he fixed maintenance for all children up to their 16th birthday, an annual pension for his widowed daughter-in-law and dowries for his three granddaughters. His grandsons were obliged to enter the military. Prince Maurice was appointed guardian of the children; Johanna Sophia's own affairs were to be handled by her brother Christian Herre, Prussian quartermaster.

The Dessau court allowed that the widow signed her documents as "Johanna Sophia, widow of the Hereditary Prince William Gustav of Anhalt" (German: Johanne Sophie des Erbprinzen Wilhelm Gustav von Anhalt Witwe) and carried the princely Anhalt coat of arms. The naming of the sons as "Lords of Anhalt" and the daughters as "Dames" also testifies to a partial recognition of their social standing.

=== Imperial Countess of Anhalt ===
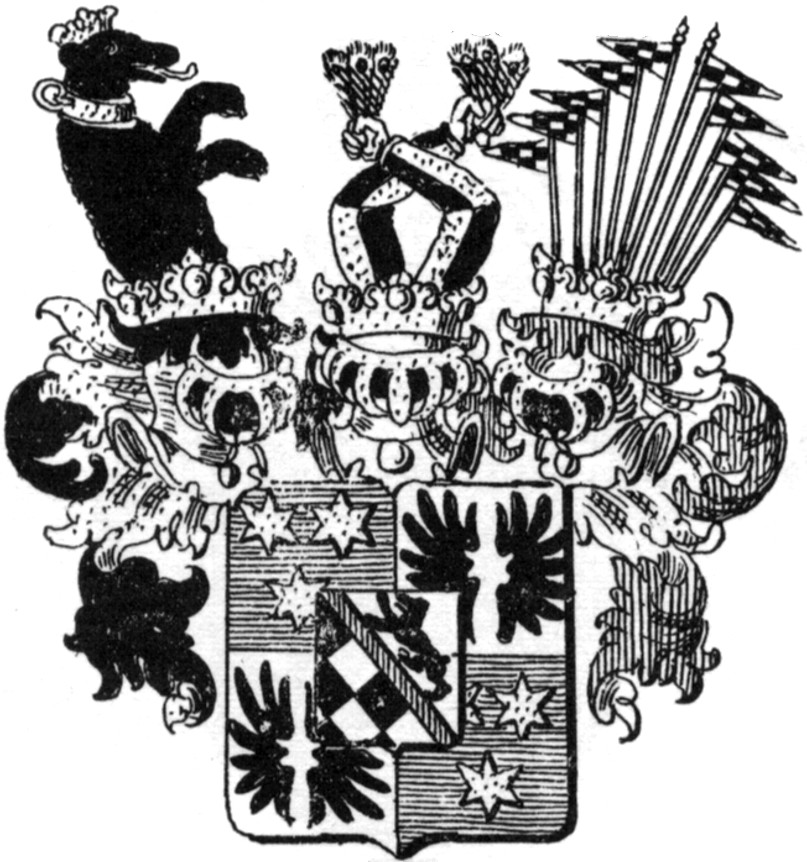
Coats of arms of the Reichsgrafen von Anhalt, 1749.

Johanna Sophia Herre continue to lived in seclusion at Gut Kleckewitz until the Prince Leopold I's death on 9 April 1747. Her three older sons joined the Prussian army, the younger children were raised together by her and the appointed guardian, Prince Maurice.

This situation changed when the new Prince of Anhalt-Dessau, Leopold II Maximilian, began the procedures to the ennoblement of the family of his deceased older brother from 1748. After clarifying the financial questions (Prince Leopold II and his siblings shared the cost of 22,000 Reichsthalers) the formal application was made to the Reichshofrat (Imperial Council) in Vienna. On 19 September 1749, Francis I, Holy Roman Emperor gave his consent and Johanna Sophia Herre and her nine children became the Imperial Counts and Countesses of Anhalt (German: Reichsgrafen und -gräfinnen von Anhalt). Associated with this was the right to use their own coat of arms, but the exclusion of the children from the Anhalt succession was confirmed.

In that year, Prince Leopold II gave his sister-in-law her own palace in the Kavalierstrasse street in the main city of Dessau, along with exemption from taxes and duties. Johanna Sophia Herre then moved to Dessau, where she lived in close contact with her relatives, took part in court life and, not least, was greatly appreciated by her nephew Franz, Hereditary Prince of Anhalt-Dessau, who succeeded his father in 1751 as Prince Leopold III.

She could not meet the resulting financial needs from her own resources (based on the decrees of Prince Leopold I from January 1738) and was dependent on donations from the siblings of her deceased husband. She received from them gifts and legacies; for example, from the estate of Prince Eugen she received 18,000 thalers and an annual pension of 1,200 thalers. So she was able to buy parts of the neighboring properties and the house next to her. In 1787 she lived there with five servants and four maids.

=== Death ===
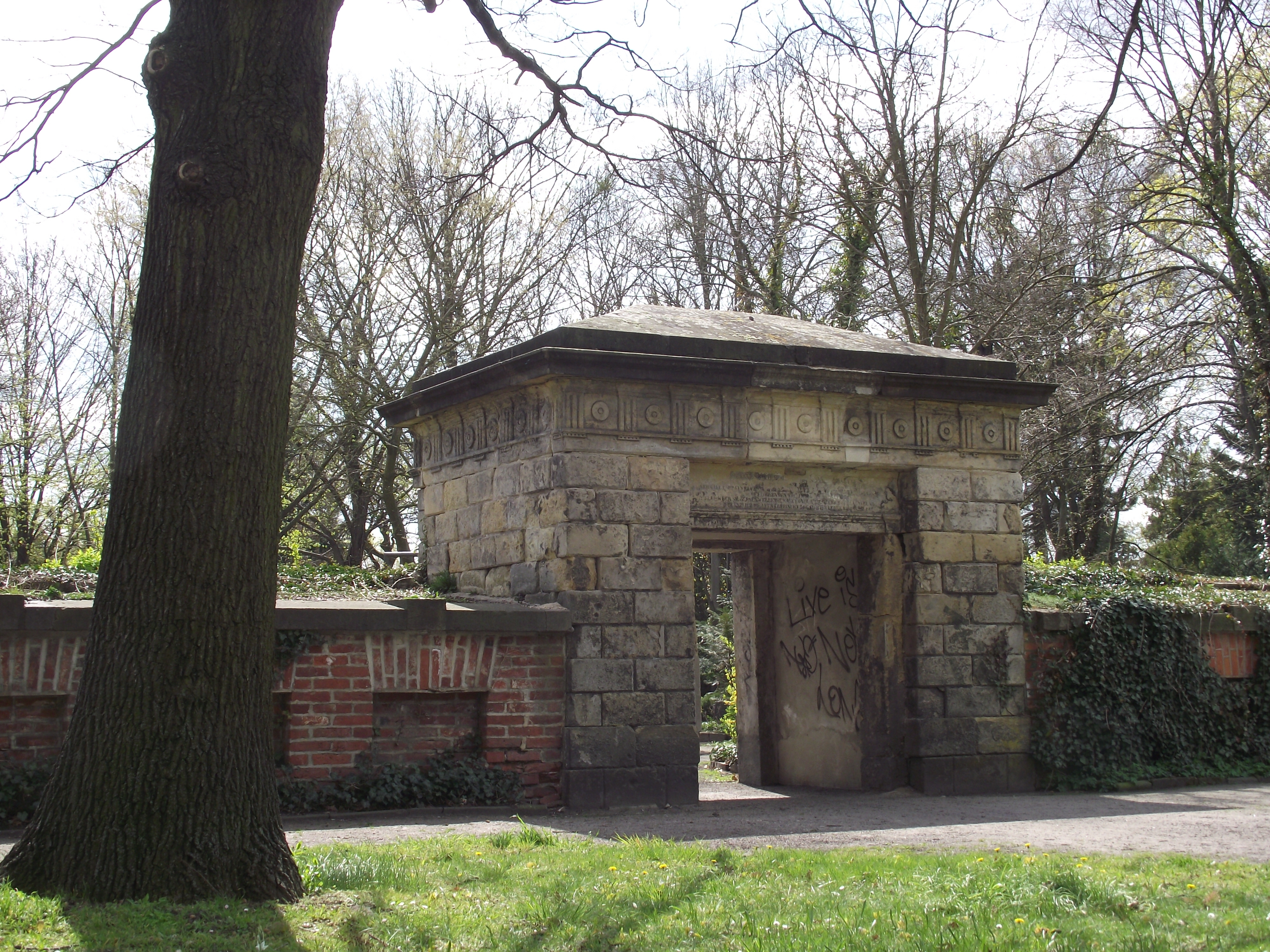
Gravestone at the historical New Cemetery, Dessau.

Imperial Countess Johanna Sophia of Anhalt was in good health all her life. She survived seven of her nine children before dying during her sleep in her home on 5 June 1796 and just one month before her 90th birthday.

Immediately after her death, Prince Leopold III of Anhalt-Dessau had a representative tombstone erected for his aunt the Imperial Countess. For this he chose the middle of the south side of the New Burial Ground (German: Neuer Begräbnisplatz) of Dessau. The Doric style vault, built of Pirnaic sandstone and plastered brick, housed a small hall with the coffin. An inscription plaque was placed over the lintel. The text (written by the Prince himself, testimony to his great respect for the deceased) reads:

johanne sophie herre / graefin zv anhalt / geboren den VIII. ivli MDCCVII / vermaelt mit gvstav erbprinzen zv anhalt-dessav, den XIV. Maerz MDCCXXVI / gestorben den V. ivnu MDCCLXXXXV. / gleich der silbernen welle, die sanft durch wiesen sich schlaengelnd / freundlich die ufer erfrischt, zog sich ihr leben dahin

Whose roughly translation is: Johanne Sophie Herre, Countess of Anhalt, born 8 July 1707, married with Gustav, Hereditary Prince of Anhalt-Dessau on 14 March 1726, died on 5 June 1796. Like the silver wave that gently wiggles its way through meadows / gently refreshes the banks, your life dragged on.

In 1833, on the occasion of the expansion of the cemetery, the burial chamber was opened, broken through and redesigned as a passage. The remains of Johanna Sophia Herre were with the permission of her granddaughter, Countess Louise Kasimire of Waldersee, reburied in a vault below the current portal.

Gut Kleckewitz remained in possession of Johanna Sophia Herre's heirs until they sold the stately property in downtown Dessau to Professor Ludwig Heinrich Ferdinand Olivier, the father of the painter brothers Heinrich, Ferdinand and Friedrich Olivier. The house was badly damaged in the bombing raids in March 1945 and was later demolished.

== Bibliography ==
- Brückner, Franz (1975–2002). Häuserbuch der Stadt Dessau (in German). Dessau: Stadtarchiv Dessau (25 volumes).
- Herre, Paul (2006). Friedrich Gast (ed.). Die geheime Ehe des Erbprinzen Wilhelm Gustav von Anhalt-Dessau und die Reichsgrafen von Anhal (in German). Dessau: Funk Verlag Hein. ISBN 3-939197-07-6.
- Würdig, Ludwig (1886). Ein Gang über die beiden Dessauer Friedhöfe (in German). Dessau.
