= Albertine of Brandenburg-Schwedt =

German princess (1712–1750)

Albertine
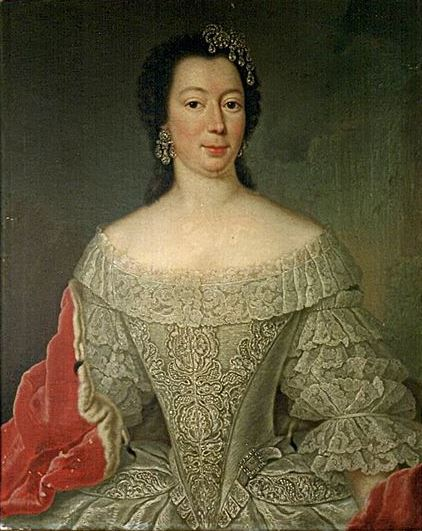

Princess Consort of Anhalt-Bernburg
- Reign: 22 May 1733 – 7 September 1750
- Born: 21 April 1712; Berlin, Kingdom of Prussia
- Died: 7 September 1750 (aged 38); Bernburg, Anhalt, Holy Roman Empire
- Spouse: Victor Frederick, Prince of Anhalt-Bernburg
- Issue: Frederick Albert, Prince of Anhalt-Bernburg; Charlotte Wilhelmine, Princess of Schwarzburg-Sondershausen; Princess Marie Karoline; Friederike, Princess of Anhalt-Zerbst; Christine, Princess of Schwarzburg-Sonderhausen
Names
- Sophie Friederike Albertine
- House: Hohenzollern (by birth); Ascania (by marriage)
- Father: Prince Albert Frederick of Prussia, Margrave of Brandenburg-Schwedt
- Mother: Princess Maria Dorothea Kettler of Courland

Albertine, Princess of Anhalt-Bernburg (née Princess Albertine of Brandenburg-Schwedt; 21 April 1712 – 7 September 1750) was the second wife of Victor Frederick, Prince of Anhalt-Bernburg.

== Biography ==
Sophie Friederike Albertine of Brandenburg-Schwedt was born in Berlin on 21 April 1712 as the third daughter of Prince Albert Frederick of Prussia, Margrave of Brandenburg-Schwedt and Princess Maria Dorothea Kettler of Courland. Her mother was a daughter of Frederick Casimir Kettler, Duke of Courland and Semigallia and Countess Sophie Amalie of Nassau-Siegen. Her paternal grandparents were Frederick William, Elector of Brandenburg and Dorothea of Schleswig-Holstein-Sonderburg-Glücksburg.

On 22 May 1733 she married Victor Frederick, Prince of Anhalt-Bernburg in Potsdam, becoming the Princess Consort of Anhalt-Bernburg. She was his second wife. His first wife, Princess Louise of Anhalt-Dessau, had died the year before in childbirth. Albertine and Victor Frederick had five children:

- Frederick Albert, Prince of Anhalt-Bernburg (1735 - 1796)
- Charlotte Wilhelmine, Princess of Schwarzburg-Sondershausen (1737 - 1777)
- Princess Marie Karoline of Anhalt-Bernburg (1739 - 1739)
- Friederike August Sophie, Princess of Anhalt-Zerbst (1744 - 1827)
- Christine Elisabeth Albertine, Princess of Schwarzburg-Sondershausen (1746 - 1823)

She died on 7 September 1750 in Bernburg. She was buried in the crypt of the Castle Church of St. Aegidien.
