= Princess Christine of Anhalt-Bernburg =

Princess Christine
- Princess of Schwarzburg-Sondershausen
- Born: 14 November 1746; Bernburg, Duchy of Anhalt-Bernburg
- Died: 18 May 1823 (aged 76); Coswig, Anhalt
- Spouse: Prince August of Schwarzburg-Sondershausen (m. 1762; died 1806)
- Issue: Prince Friedrich; Princess Katharina; Augusta, Princess of Waldeck and Pyrmont; Prince Wilhelm; Prince Alexius; Princess Friederike
- House: Ascania
- Father: Victor Frederick, Prince of Anhalt-Bernburg
- Mother: Princess Albertine of Brandenburg-Schwedt

Princess Christine of Anhalt-Bernburg (German: Christine Elisabeth Albertine von Anhalt-Bernburg; 14 November 1746 – 18 May 1823) was a Princess of Anhalt-Bernburg and was Princess of Schwarzburg-Sondershausen through her marriage to August II, Prince of Schwarzburg-Sondershausen.

== Biography ==
=== Early life ===
Christine was born in Bernburg to Victor Frederick, Prince of Anhalt-Bernburg (son of Karl Frederick, Prince of Anhalt-Bernburg and Sophie Albertine of Solms-Sonnenwalde) and Albertine of Brandenburg-Schwedt (daughter of Margrave Albert Frederick of Brandenburg-Schwedt and Princess Maria Dorothea Kettler of Courland). She was described as a gentle and loving character and was raised by tender parents.

=== Marriage and issue ===
On 27 April 1762 a ceremonial wedding took place between her and her first cousin Prince August of Schwarzburg-Sondershausen, the brother of the then reigning Christian Günther III, Prince of Schwarzburg-Sondershausen, after rejecting many sons from noble families. From then on she left Bernburg and the newly wedded couple resided in Sondershausen Palace. It was said that she soon won the hearts of all residents through her exceptional affability and friendly condescension.

Their marriage resulted in 6 children, most dying in their youth. Christine survived 5 of her 6 children. She is also a direct ancestor of Queen Emma, Queen Wilhelmina, Princess Helen, Duchess of Albany and Princess Alice of Albany through her daughter Princess Augusta.

- Prince Friedrich of Schwarzburg-Sondershausen (1763–1791)
- Princess Katharina of Schwarzburg-Sondershausen (1764–1775)
- Princess Augusta of Schwarzburg-Sondershausen (1768–1849), who married George I, Prince of Waldeck and Pyrmont and had issue.
- Prince Wilhelm of Schwarzburg-Sondershausen (1770–1807)
- Prince Alexius of Schwarzburg-Sondershausen (1773–1777)
- Princess Friederike of Schwarzburg-Sondershausen (1774–1806), who married Friedrich Karl of Sayn-Wittgenstein and had issue.

=== Later life ===
In the later years of her life, there was unhappiness within her marriage, things gradually arose in the marriage, the two would have rather been separated away. Christine decided that it would be better if she left Sondershausen, where she was universally loved, she still considered it beneficial for her peace of mind. Therefore, without formally divorcing her husband she left. She spent the remaining years of her life residing in Coswig Castle with her widowed sister Friederike Auguste Sophie of Anhalt-Bernburg.

She died in Coswig aged 76.

== Ancestry ==
Ancestors of Princess Christine of Anhalt-Bernburg

8. Victor Amadeus, Prince of Anhalt-Bernburg
4. Karl Frederick, Prince of Anhalt-Bernburg
9. Countess Elizabeth of Palatinate-Zweibrücken
2. Victor Frederick, Prince of Anhalt-Bernburg
10. Georges Frédéric of Solms-Sonnenwalde
5. Sofie Albertine of Solms-Sonnenwalde
11. Princess Anna of Anhalt-Bernburg
1. Princess Christine of Anhalt-Bernburg
12. Frederick William, Elector of Brandenburg
6. Margrave Albert Frederick of Brandenburg-Schwedt
13. Princess Dorothea Sophie of Schleswig-Holstein-Sonderburg-Glücksburg
3. Princess Albertine of Brandenburg-Schwedt
14. Frederick Casimir Kettler, Duke of Courland and Semigallia
7. Princess Maria Dorothea Kettler of Courland
15. Princess Sophie Amalie of Nassau-Siegen
