= Bernhard III of Anhalt-Bernburg =

German prince (d. 1348)

Bernhard III
- Prince of Anhalt-Bernburg.
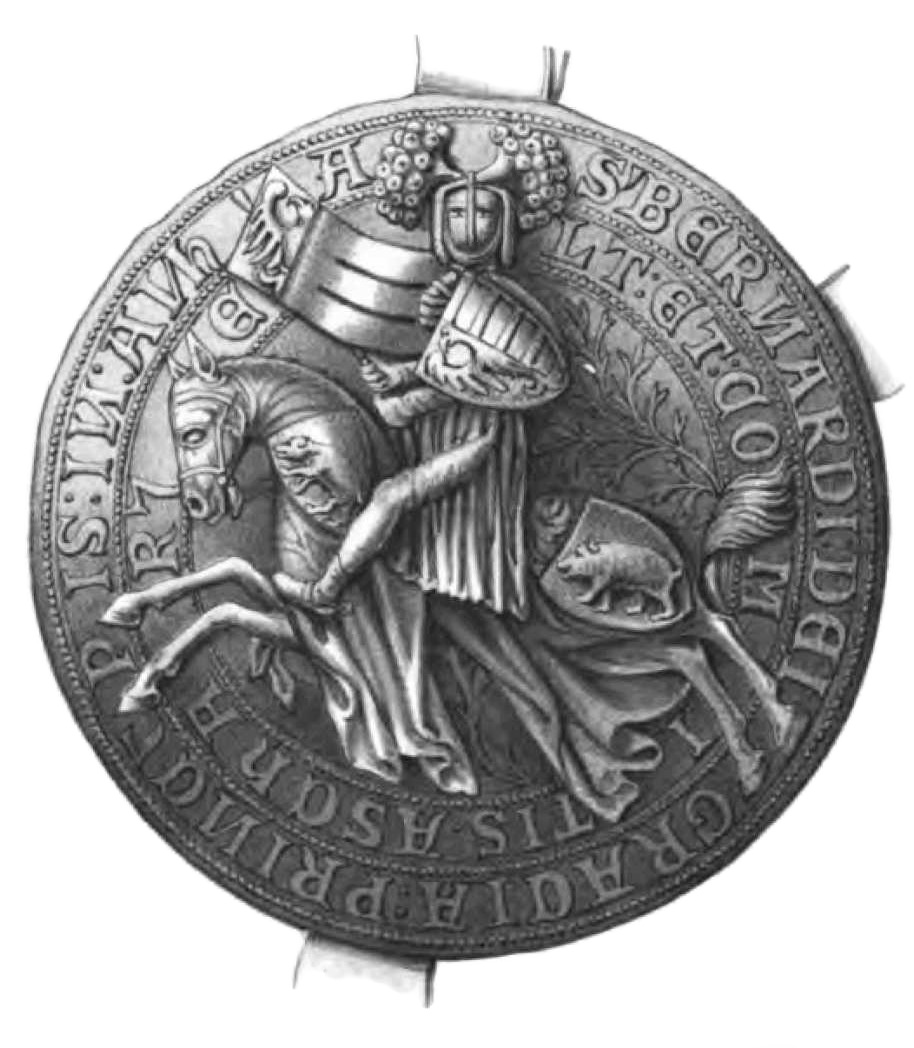
- Bernhard III's seal
- Died: 20 August 1348
- Spouse: Agnes of Saxe-Wittenberg; Matilda, daughter of Albert I, Prince of Anhalt-Zerbst; Matilda, daughter of Magnus I, Duke of Brunswick-Lüneburg
- Royal house: House of Ascania
- Father: Bernhard II, Prince of Anhalt-Bernburg
- Mother: Helene of Rügen

Bernhard III, Prince of Anhalt-Bernburg (died 20 August 1348) was a German prince of the House of Ascania and ruler of the principality of Anhalt-Bernburg.

He was the eldest son of Bernhard II, Prince of Anhalt-Bernburg, by his wife Helene, daughter of Wizlaw II, Prince of Rügen.

== Life ==
Bernhard succeeded his father as ruler of Anhalt-Bernburg after his death in 1323. His two younger brothers renounced their rights in order to become priests, which left Bernhard as sole ruler of Bernburg. Along with his princely title, he also used the styles "Count of Askanien" and "Lord of Bernburg".

== Marriages and children ==
In 1328 Bernhard married Agnes (c. 1310 – 4 January 1338), daughter of Rudolph I, Elector of Saxony and Duke of Saxe-Wittenberg. Her paternal grandmother and namesake Agnes of Habsburg was a daughter of Rudolph I, King of the Romans. The spouses were third cousins: Agnes's great-grandfather Albert I, Duke of Saxony, was a brother of Henry I, Count of Anhalt, Bernhard's great-grandfather.

Bernhard and Agnes had five children:

1. Bernhard IV, Prince of Anhalt-Bernburg (died 28 June 1354)
2. Katharina (c. 1330 – 30 January 1390), first married on 6 October 1356 to Magnus II, Duke of Brunswick-Lüneburg, then secondly on 11 May 1374 to Albert of Saxe-Wittenberg, Duke of Lüneburg
3. Henry IV, Prince of Anhalt-Bernburg (died 7 July 1374)
4. Albert (died 1 August 1336)
5. Sophie (died 18 December 1362), married on 12 March 1346 to William II, Duke of Brunswick-Lüneburg.

In 1339 Bernhard married for a second time to Matilda (died c. 1342), daughter of Albert I, Prince of Anhalt-Zerbst. Bernhard was more closely related to his bride, being a second cousin: Matilda's grandfather was Siegfried I, Prince of Anhalt-Zerbst, younger brother of Bernhard I, Prince of Anhalt-Bernburg, Bernhard's grandfather. The marriage was childless.

In c. 1343, Bernhard married for a third time to another Matilda (died after 28 June 1354), daughter of Magnus I, Duke of Brunswick-Göttingen. Through her mother Sophie of Brandenburg, Matilda was a great-great-great-granddaughter of Otto I, Margrave of Brandenburg, older brother of Bernhard, Count of Anhalt, Bernhard's great-great-grandfather.

Bernhard and Matilda of Brunswick-Göttingen had two children:

1. Otto III, Prince of Anhalt-Bernburg (died 27 February 1404)
2. Gertrude, married before 12 August 1371 to Günther XII, Count of Schwarzburg.

Bernhard III of Anhalt-Bernburg House of Ascania Died: 20 August 1348
Preceded by Bernhard II	Prince of Anhalt-Bernburg; 1323–1348	Succeeded by Bernhard IV
