= Henriette Amalie of Anhalt-Dessau (1720–1793) =

Anhalter princess (1720–1793)

Henriette Amalie
- Born: 7 December 1720
- Died: 5 December 1793 (aged 72); Dessau
- Issue: Son (illegitimate)
- House: Ascania
- Father: Leopold I, Prince of Anhalt-Dessau
- Mother: Anna Louise Föhse

Princess Henriette Amalie of Anhalt-Dessau (7 December 1720 – 5 December 1793) was the fifth (fourth surviving) and youngest daughter of Leopold I, Prince of Anhalt-Dessau, by his morganatic wife, Anna Louise Föhse.

== Life ==
In 1741 the 21-year-old princess Henriette Amalie gave birth to an extramarital son. When she refused to marry the father – the son of a court retainer – she was banished from the Dessau court. During the next eleven years she lived as a nun in Herford. Later her father (who had himself fathered two illegitimate children) tried to find a suitable husband for her, but all marriage plans failed. In the meanwhile, she lived openly with the Baron of Rackmann, who was fifteen years her junior. Thanks to her intervention, he was raised to the rank of Imperial Count and Baron of Bangert.

Probably to be near her son (who had been placed in the care of a banker's family), Henriette Amalie acquired a large house in Bockenheim, later named the "Villa Passavant," then built the former Franck-school and finally the current Saint Elisabeth's hospital.

In 1753 the princess acquired a property with a house and orangery attached. She pursued extensive agriculture activities and made the estate virtually self-sufficient. She introduced silkworm (Bombyx mori) breeding, kept bees, and sold oranges from her own residence. Also, she fostered the cultivation of asparagus and the growing of other fruits and vegetables.

In Kreuznach she acquired the feudal estate (German: Rittergut) of Bangert and established there a small castle (today a public museum) in the classicist style to replace the old manor house; it was completed about 1775.

The princess managed her extended properties herself and was also an enthusiastic farmer. Her financial acumen became the basis for an independent and free life. She was said to have been five times richer than the richest farmer in that region. With her wealth, she supported numerous artists.

In 1771 she extended her country house with annexes to the castle. Approximately 700 works of art were exhibited in the "Galerie" of the first floor of the remodeled castle. Near the castle, a "Marmorbad" was created. Around this time her son died at approximately 30 years of age, a victim of consumption.

In 1790 she acquired a Frankfurt townhouse in Eschenheimer lane.

When French revolutionary troops moved approached Frankfurt in 1792, Henriette Amalie fled to her native Dessau and moved into the "Palais Dietrich" (named after its former owner, her brother Dietrich, who had died in 1769).

Henriette Amalie herself died one year later, two days before her seventy-third birthday. She was buried in Dessau without any of her family members at her funeral.

== Literature ==
- Walther Schmidt: Prinzessin Henriette Amalie von Anhalt-Dessau. Die Begründerin der Fürstlichen Amalienstiftung in Dessau. Funk Verlag Bernhard Hein, Dessau 2009, ISBN 978-3-939197-38-6
