= Otto III of Anhalt-Bernburg =

German prince

Otto III, Prince of Anhalt-Bernburg (died 27 February 1404) was a German prince of the House of Ascania and ruler of the principality of Anhalt-Bernburg.

He was the youngest son of Bernhard III, Prince of Anhalt-Bernburg, by his third wife Matilda, daughter of Magnus I, Duke of Brunswick-Göttingen.

== Life ==
Bypassed in his rights of inheritance during the life of his older half-brothers Bernhard IV and Henry IV, he only took possession of the principality of Anhalt-Bernburg when Henry died in 1374. Alongside his princely title, he also assumed the style "Lord of Bernburg".

On his death, Otto was succeeded by his nephew Bernhard V, son of the late Henry IV, and by his youngest son Otto IV, who ruled jointly with Bernhard.

== Marriages and Issue ==
By his unknown first wife, Otto had two sons:

1. Bernhard VI, Prince of Anhalt-Bernburg (d. 2 February 1468)
2. Otto IV, Prince of Anhalt-Bernburg (d. 1 May 1415).

Before 1391 Otto married for a second time to Lutrudis (d. aft. 2 July 1426), daughter of Gebhard IV, Count of Mansfeld-Querfurt. They had one daughter:

1. Matilda (d. Coswig, bef. 1432), married aft. 1413 to George I, Prince of Anhalt-Dessau.

Otto III of Anhalt-Bernburg House of Ascania Died: 27 February 1404
Regnal titles
Preceded by Henry IV	Prince of Anhalt-Bernburg; 1374–1404	Succeeded by Otto IV and Bernard V
