= Frederick Albert, Prince of Anhalt-Bernburg =

Frederick Albert
- Prince of Anhalt-Bernburg
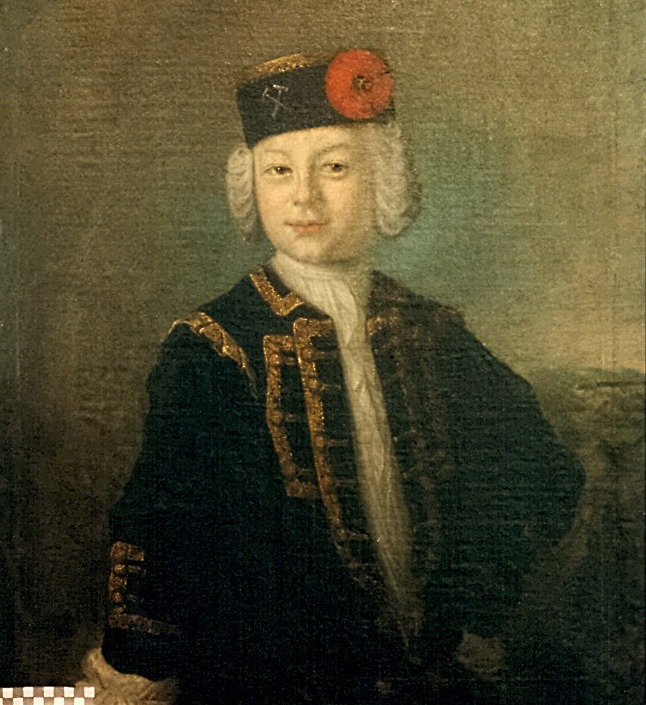
- Portrait, 1747

Prince of Anhalt-Bernburg
- Reign: 18 May 1765–9 April 1796
- Predecessor: Victor Frederick
- Successor: Alexius Frederick Christian
- Born: 15 August 1735; Bernburg, Anhalt-Bernburg, Holy Roman Empire
- Died: 9 April 1796 (aged 60); Ballenstedt, Anhalt-Bernburg, Holy Roman Empire
- Spouse: Louise Albertine of Schleswig-Holstein-Sonderburg-Plön (m. 1763; died 1769)
- Issue: Alexius Frederick Christian, Duke of Anhalt-Bernburg; Pauline, Princess of Lippe-Detmold
Names
- Frederick Albert; German: Friedrich Albrecht
- House: House of Ascania
- Father: Victor Frederick, Prince of Anhalt-Bernburg
- Mother: Albertine of Brandenburg-Schwedt

Frederick Albert of Anhalt-Bernburg (15 August 1735 – 9 April 1796), was a German prince of the House of Ascania and reigning prince of the principality of Anhalt-Bernburg from 1765 to 1796.

== Life ==
Frederick Albert was born in Bernburg on 15 August 1735 as the only son of Victor Frederick, Prince of Anhalt-Bernburg, by his second wife Albertine of Brandenburg-Schwedt, daughter of Margrave Albert Frederick of Brandenburg-Schwedt.

Frederick Albert succeeded his father as ruler of Anhalt-Bernburg when he died in 1765 and immediately changed his main residence from Bernburg to Ballenstedt.

On 22 December 1785 he confirmed the entrance of his state into the Fürstenbund.

In 1788 a classical theater was built under his orders. He was considered as "Father of the Country" by the citizens of his principality, primarily for his good works: one of his reforms was to give women legal influence over their inheritance. Frederick Albert was also the founder of the Anhaltische Mineraliensammlung.

He died at Ballenstedt on 9 April 1796. It is unclear whether he died as a result of a hunting accident, or if he committed suicide.

== Marriage and issue ==
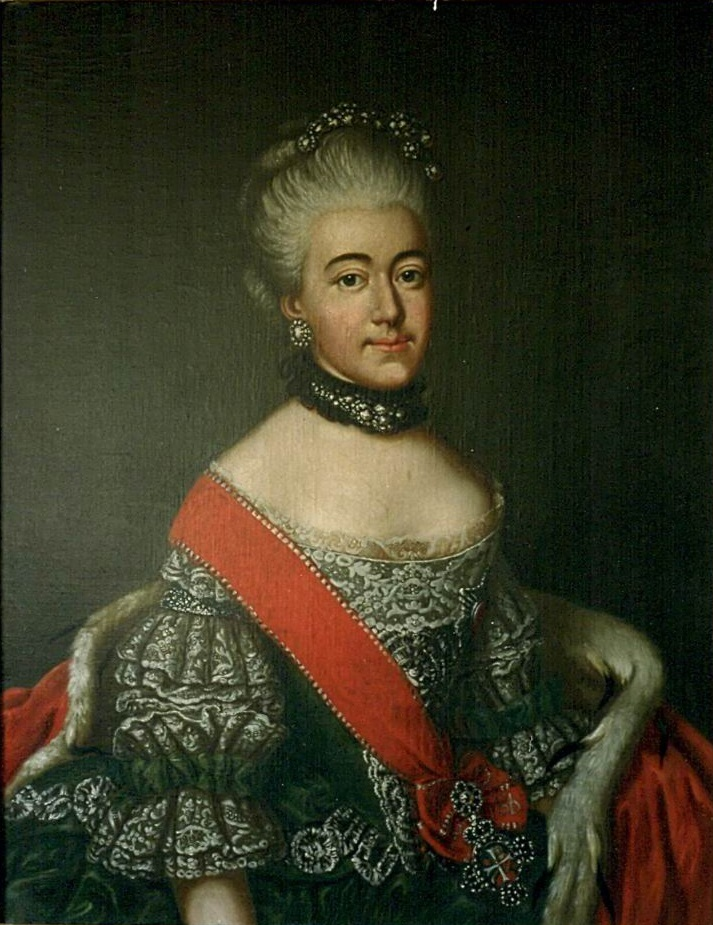
Louise Albertine of Schleswig-Holstein-Sonderburg-Plön

Royal monogram.

In Augustenburg on 4 June 1763 Frederick Albert married Princess Louise Albertine (b. Plön, 21 July 1748 - d. Ballenstedt, 2 March 1769), daughter of Frederick Carl, Duke of Schleswig-Holstein-Sonderburg-Plön and a princess of Denmark by birth as a descendant in the male line of King Christian III. They had two children:

1. Alexius Frederick Christian, Prince and from 1807 Duke of Anhalt-Bernburg (b. Ballenstedt, 12 June 1767 - d. Ballenstedt, 24 March 1834).
2. Pauline Christine Wilhelmine (b. Ballenstedt, 23 February 1769 - d. Detmold, 29 December 1820), married on 2 January 1796 to Leopold I, Prince of Lippe-Detmold.

Frederick Albert also had an illegitimate daughter:

1. Auguste von Gröna (d. 8 April 1841), married to Hans August Baron von Bissing (d. 8 April 1841).

Preceded by Victor Frederick	Prince of Anhalt-Bernburg; 1765–1796	Succeeded by Alexius Frederick Christian
