= Friederike Auguste Sophie of Anhalt-Bernburg =

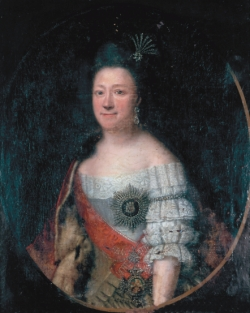

Princess consort of Anhalt-Zerbst
- Tenure: 27 May 1764 – 3 March 1793
- Born: 28 August 1744; Bernburg, Anhalt-Bernburg, Holy Roman Empire
- Died: 12 April 1827 (aged 82); Coswig, Anhalt-Bernburg, Holy Roman Empire
- Spouse: Frederick Augustus, Prince of Anhalt-Zerbst
- House: House of Ascania
- Father: Victor Frederick, Prince of Anhalt-Bernburg
- Mother: Albertine of Brandenburg-Schwedt

Friederike Auguste Sophie of Anhalt-Bernburg (28 August 1744, Bernburg – 12 April 1827, Coswig) was a princess consort of Anhalt-Zerbst. She was married to Frederick Augustus, Prince of Anhalt-Zerbst, and sister-in-law to the Russian Empress Catherine the Great. She was the regent governor of Jever from April 1793, until October 1806.

== Biography ==
She was the daughter of Victor Frederick, Prince of Anhalt-Bernburg, and Princess Albertine of Brandenburg-Schwedt (1712–1750), and married Frederick Augustus, Prince of Anhalt-Zerbst, 22 May 1764 at Ballenstedt am Harz. Due to a conflict with Prussia, Frederick Augustus had been living in exile since 1758, and the couple settled in Basel in 1765. She was in contact with Isaak Iselin and Peter Ochs and was dedicated the book "Geschichte der Stadt und Landschaft Basel" (1786). In 1780–1791, she lived apart from her spouse, who moved to Luxemburg.

In 1793, her husband died childless, and his territories were divided among his relatives. The area of Jever, which allowed for female succession, was inherited by his sister Catherine the Great. Friederike was appointed regent-governor in Jever on Catherine's behalf in April 1793. She is described as an active regent who introduced many reforms. She was forced to resign when Jever was taken by France under Napoleon in October 1806.

She spent her remaining life with her sister Christine, Princess of Schwarzburg-Sondershausen (1746 - 1823) at Coswig Castle.
