= Margrave Frederick William of Brandenburg-Schwedt (1715–1744) =

Prussian commander

Frederick William
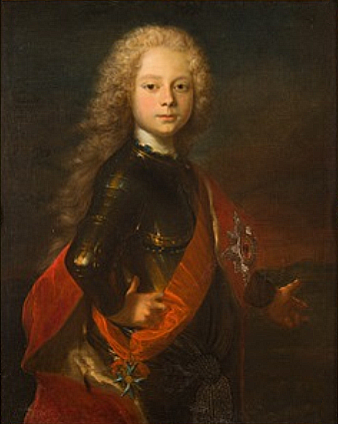
- 1724 portrait
- Born: 18 March 1715
- Died: 12 September 1744 (aged 29); Prague
- Burial: Berlin Cathedral
- House: Hohenzollern
- Father: Margrave Albert Frederick of Brandenburg-Schwedt
- Mother: Maria Dorothea of Courland

Frederick William of Brandenburg-Schwedt (18 March 1715 – 12 September 1744 in Prague) was a Prussian Major General and commander of the Guards on Foot. In his lifetime he held the courtesy title of Margrave of Brandenburg. His first cousin of the same name (Frederick William) was of the senior line and held the town and lands of Schwedt.

== Life ==
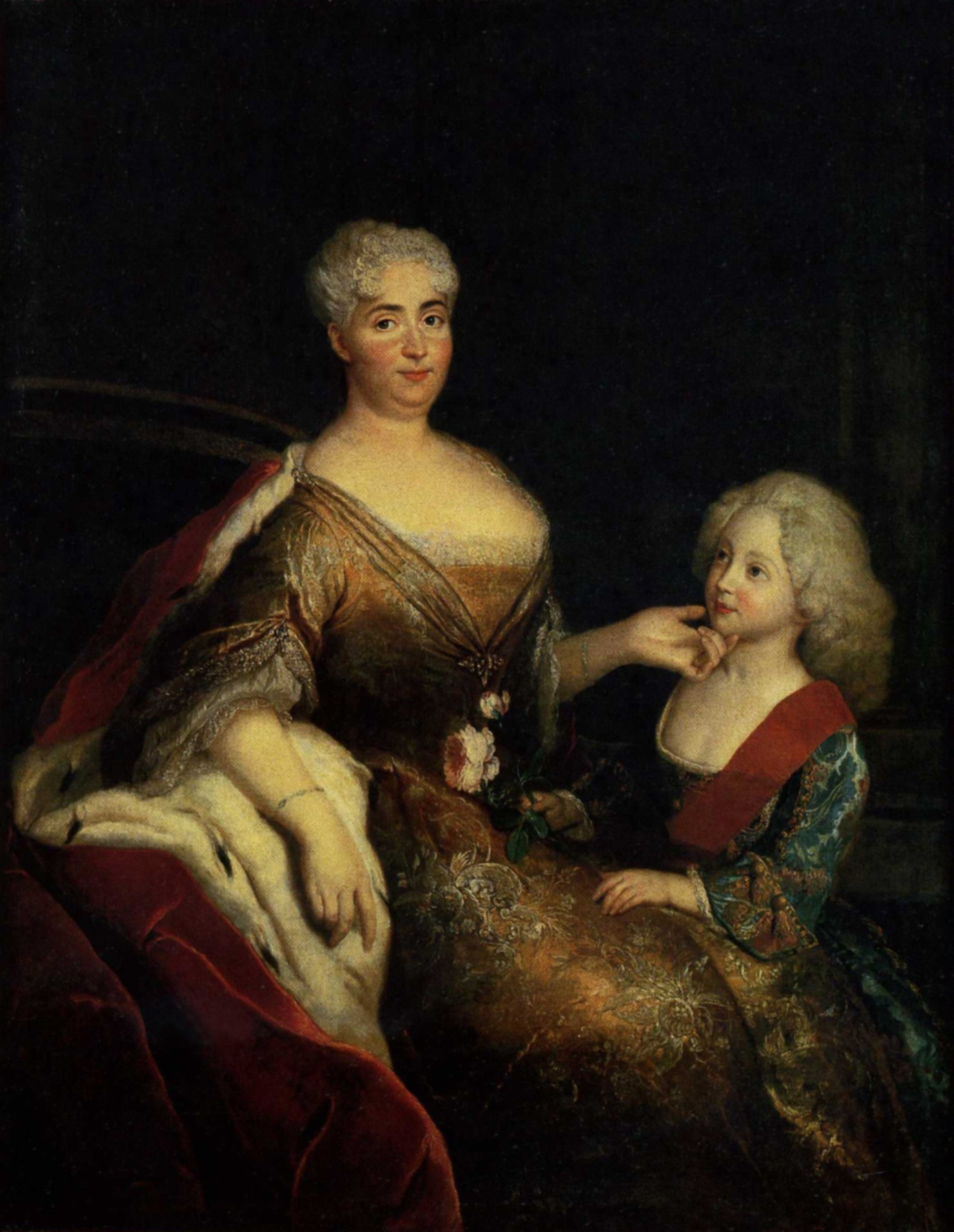
Maria Dorothea with her son Frederick William (portrait by Antoine Pesne, c. 1719)

He was the son of Margrave Albert Frederick of Brandenburg-Schwedt and his wife Maria Dorothea of Courland. In May 1719, when he was only four years old, he was awarded the Order of the Black Eagle.

From 1734, he participated as a volunteer in the campaigns of the Prussian army. During the War of the Austrian Succession, he was wounded in the Battle of Mollwitz. His elder brother Frederick fell during this battle.

In 1740, the Guard on Foot were formed from the Infantry Regiment Nr. 15, and Frederick William was the first colonel of the new unit. On 16 May 1743 he was promoted to major general and made commander of the Guard.

During the Siege of Prague in 1744, he commanded the trenches. The king was present when he was killed by a cannonball. His body was transferred to Berlin and he was buried in the Hohenzollern crypt in Berlin Cathedral.
