= Anna Wilhelmine of Anhalt-Dessau =

Anna Wilhelmine
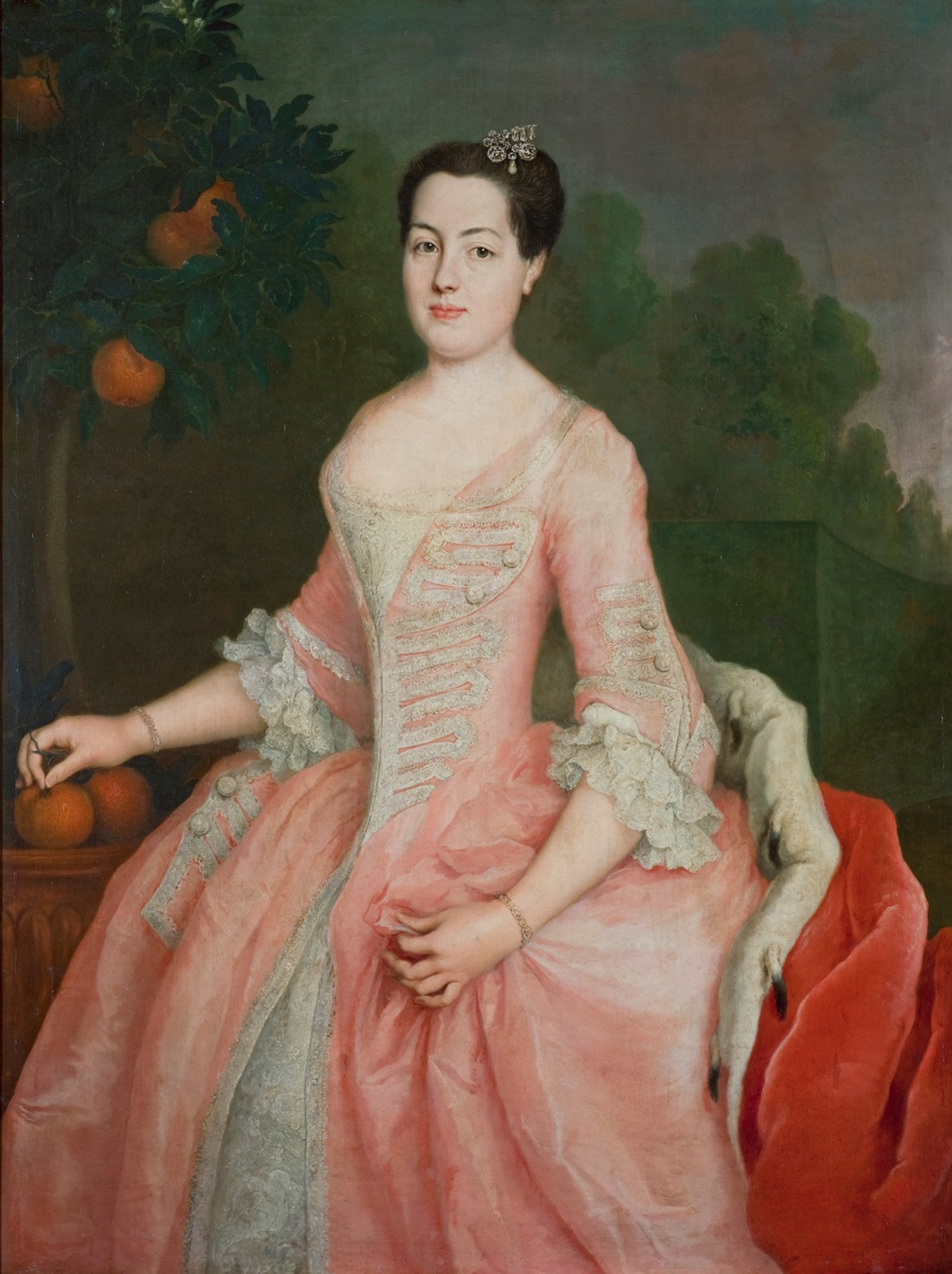
- Portrait by Lisiewski, 1745
- Born: 13 June 1715; Dessau
- Died: 2 April 1780 (aged 64); Dessau
- House: Ascania
- Father: Leopold I of Anhalt-Dessau
- Mother: Anna Luise Föhse

Anna Wilhelmine of Anhalt-Dessau (13 June 1715, in Dessau – 2 April 1780, in Dessau), was a German princess of the House of Ascania from the Anhalt-Dessau branch.

She was the third (but second surviving) daughter of Leopold I, Prince of Anhalt-Dessau, by his morganatic wife Anna Louise Föhse.

== Life ==
As the favorite child of her father, Anna Wilhelmine was given the Mosigkau Manor near Dessau for her residence in 1742. The princess, who remained unmarried all her life, began renovations on her new home with an architect from the Saxon school. From 1757 she spent her summers in the new Mosigkau Palace.

Her talent in finances became renowned when her brother Maurice allowed her control over the administration of his household and possessions during the period of his fatal war injury in 1759.

In the year of her death, Anna Wilhelmine ordered the establishment of a "Noble lady's convent" (German: Das Hochadelige Fräuleinstift Mosigkau) in Mosigkau Castle. The convent existed until 1945. Since then the Castle has been accessible as a museum.
