= Otto IV of Anhalt-Bernburg =

German prince

Otto IV, Prince of Anhalt-Bernburg (died 1415) was a German prince of the House of Ascania and ruler of the principality of Anhalt-Bernburg.

He was the youngest son of Otto III, Prince of Anhalt-Bernburg, by his unknown first wife.

== Life ==
Otto succeeded his father (bypassing his older brother Bernhard) when he died in 1404, but was obliged to rule jointly with his cousin Bernhard V, son of Henry IV.

He died unmarried and childless and was succeeded by his cousin and co-ruler Bernhard V. Otto's older brother Bernhard VI could only take possession of Bernburg five years later, in 1420, after the death of Bernhard V.

Otto IV of Anhalt-Bernburg House of Ascania Died: 1 May 1415
Regnal titles
Preceded by Otto III	Prince of Anhalt-Bernburg; 1404–1415 with his cousin Bernard V (1404–1420)	Succeeded by Bernard V
