= Bernhard V of Anhalt-Bernburg =

German prince

Bernhard V, Prince of Anhalt-Bernburg (died 24 June 1420) was a German prince of the House of Ascania and ruler of the principality of Anhalt-Bernburg.

He was the eldest son of Henry IV, Prince of Anhalt-Bernburg, by his wife Sophie, a possible member of the House of Stolberg.

== Life ==
After the death of his father in 1374, Bernhard was bypassed as heir during the rule of his uncle Otto III. When Otto died in 1404, Bernhard finally took possession of the principality of Anhalt-Bernburg, but he was compelled to rule jointly with his youngest cousin Otto IV until the latter's death in 1415. Bernhard's sole rule lasted only five years.

On his death without male issue, Bernhard was succeeded by his cousin Bernhard VI, eldest son of Otto III.

== Marriage and issue ==
On 8 September 1396, Bernhard married Elisabeth (d. 1426), daughter of Ulrich III, Count of Honstein-Kelbra. Both spouses were great-great-grandchildren of Bernhard I, Prince of Anhalt-Bernburg, through his children Sophie and Bernhard II. This marriage only produced one daughter:

- Adelheid (d. aft. 1434), married Frederick I, Duke of Brunswick-Osterode and, after his death, Maurice IV, Count of Spiegelberg.

Bernhard V of Anhalt-Bernburg House of Ascania Died: 24 June 1420
Regnal titles
Preceded by Otto III	Prince of Anhalt-Bernburg; 1404–1420 with his cousin Otto IV (1404–1415)	Succeeded by Bernard VI
