= Bernhard I =

Bernhard I may refer to:

- Bernard I, Duke of Saxony (c. 950–1011)
- Bernhard I, Prince of Anhalt-Bernburg (c. 1218–1287)
- Bernhard I, Duke of Saxe-Meiningen (1649–1706)
