= Dietrich of Anhalt-Dessau =

German prince and regent

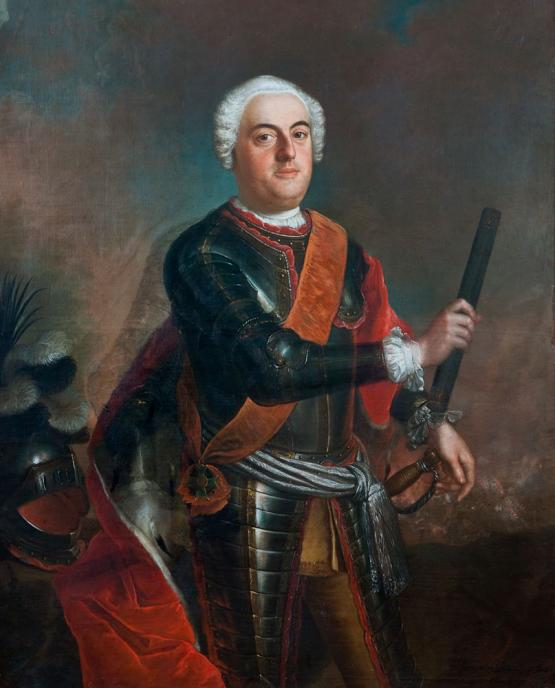
Dietrich of Anhalt-Dessau

Dietrich of Anhalt-Dessau (b. Dessau, 2 August 1702 - d. Dessau, 2 December 1769), was a German prince of the House of Ascania and later regent of the principality of Anhalt-Dessau. He was also a Prussian Generalfeldmarschall.

Dietrich was the third son of Leopold I, Prince of Anhalt-Dessau, by his morganatic wife Anna Louise Föhse.

== Life ==
The introduction of primogeniture in Anhalt-Dessau in 1727 left Dietrich without any chance to take part in the government of Dessau. Because his oldest brother, the Hereditary Prince William Gustav, had already died before his father, the second brother, Leopold Maximilian, inherited the princely title and government. After the latter's death in 1751, the succession passed to his eleven-year-old son Leopold Frederick Franz. Dietrich acted as regent of Anhalt-Dessau on behalf of his nephew until 1758, when Leopold Frederick Franz was proclaimed an adult and assumed the government of his principality.

Dietrich never married or had children. Later, his palace in Dessau was used by a progressive school, "The Philanthropinum".
