= Battle of Kesselsdorf =

1745 battle of the War of the Austrian Succession

- Part of the Second Silesian War (War of the Austrian Succession)
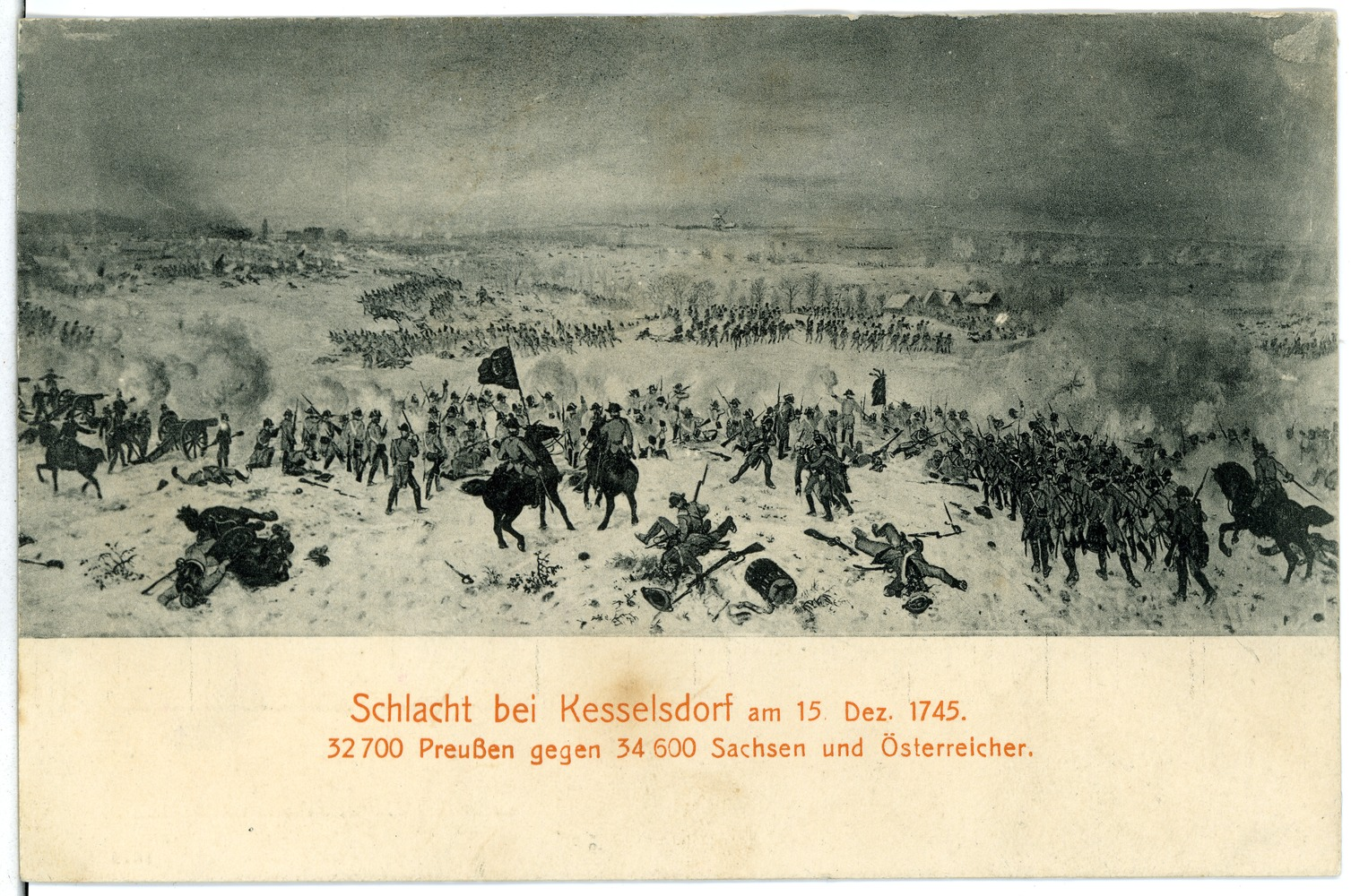
Date	15 December 1745
Location	Kesselsdorf, near Dresden, present-day Germany
Result	Prussian victory

Belligerents
Prussia	Saxony (Habsburg monarchy) Austria

Commanders and leaders
(Kingdom of Prussia) Leopold I, Prince of Anhalt-Dessau	(Electorate of Saxony) Field Marshal Rutowsky

Strength
32,000; 33 field guns additional battalion guns	35,000: 28,000 Saxons; 7,000 Austrians; 80 field and battalion guns

Casualties and losses
5,100: 1,600 killed; 3,500 wounded and missing	10,500: 3,800 dead and wounded; 6,700 captured; 48 cannon

The Battle of Kesselsdorf was fought on 15 December 1745, between the Kingdom of Prussia and the combined forces of the Archduchy of Austria and the Electorate of Saxony during the part of the War of the Austrian Succession known as the Second Silesian War. The Prussians were led by Leopold I, Prince of Anhalt-Dessau, while the Austrians and Saxons were led by Field Marshal Rutowsky. The Prussians were victorious over the Royal Saxon Army and the Imperial Army of the Holy Roman Emperor.

== Preliminary maneuvers ==
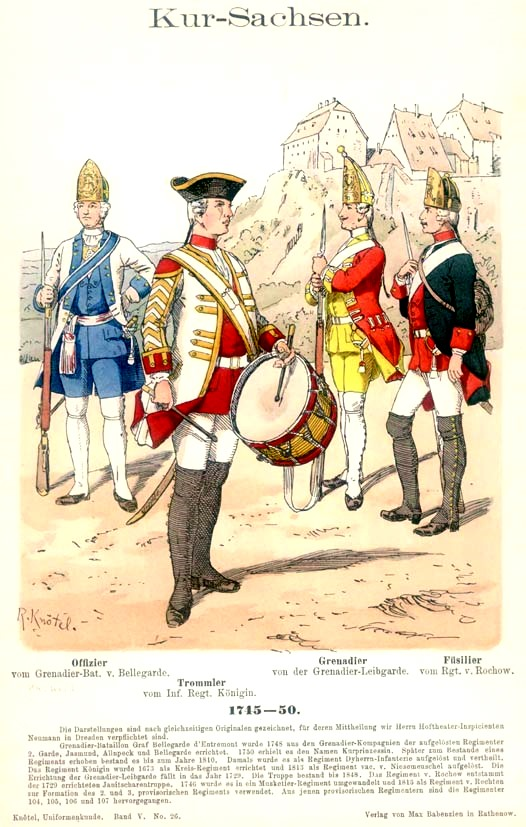
Saxon Soldiers

Two Prussian columns, one led by Frederick, the second by Leopold the 'Old Dessauer' were converging on Dresden, the capital of Saxony, which was at that time an Austrian ally. Interposed between Leopold and Dresden was Rutowsky with an army of Saxons and Austrians. Leopold moved slowly and deliberately forward entering Saxon territory on the 29 November and advanced on Rutowsky at Leipzig, whereupon Rutowsky retired towards Dresden. By the 12 December, Leopold reached Meissen and joined with a corps under Hans von Lehwaldt. Rutowsky was reinforced by some Austrians under Grünne and took up a position at Kesselsdorf, 5 miles west of Dresden. This position covered Dresden while leaving him closer to the advancing Austrians under Charles of Lorraine than Leopold was to Frederick. The Saxons deployed along a ridge that ran from Kesselsdorf to the river Elbe which was fronted by a stream and marshy ground. The 7,000 Austrians under Grünne formed on the right near the Elbe. The line was long and there was a considerable gap in its center between the Saxons and the Austrians. On the fifteenth, Leopold finally came up. There was much snow and ice on the field.

== Battle ==
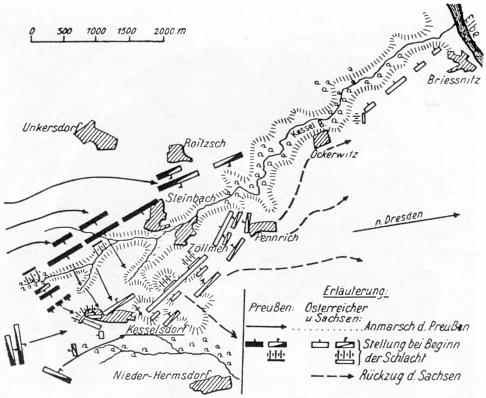
Course of the battle

The Prussians were slightly outnumbered 35,000 to 32,000. Additionally, the Saxons and Austrians had the advantage of the ground. Dessauer, a long experienced general now sixty eight years of age perceived that by taking the town of Kesselsdorf, the enemies' flank could be turned and therefore concentrated his efforts against the Saxon portion of the army. The Saxons had Kesselsdorf defended with twenty-four heavy cannons, their engineers and carpenters enhancing its defensibility. Leopold made dispositions for an attack by an elite force of infantry and grenadiers, however the ground was very difficult and the first attack was repulsed with considerable loss, including the officer leading the attack, General Hertzberg. A second, reinforced attack was made and this too failed with the Prussians fleeing in disorder. The Prussians had suffered some 1,500 casualties from the attacking forces of 3,500.

The Saxon grenadiers, seeing the flight of the Prussians, left their strong defensive position and made an impetuous pursuit of the Prussians which exposed them to a massed charge by the dragoons of the Prussian cavalry. The shock of the charge sent the Saxons tumbling back and through their former position in Kesselsdorf, driving them from the field. At this same time, Leopold's son, Prince Moritz, personally led an infantry regiment which broke through the Saxon center. The regiment, although isolated, held its ground while other Prussian regiments attempted but failed to link up with it due to the stubbornness of the Saxon defense. Eventually, Leopold's success in taking Kesselsdorf bore fruit and the Saxon flank was turned causing the Saxon line to collapse and their army to flee at nightfall.

The Prussians' losses amounted to over sixteen hundred killed and more than three thousand wounded, while the Saxon losses were less than four thousand killed and wounded with almost seven thousand Saxons taken prisoner as well as forty eight cannon and seven standards. During the battle, the Austrians on the right never fired a shot, while Charles, who had reached Dresden and could hear the cannon, failed to march to the aid of his ally.

== Aftermath ==
The Saxons fled in a wild panic into Dresden. There, despite the presence of Charles and his army of 18,000 and the Austrians' willingness to renew battle, they continued to flee. Leopold then linked up his forces with those of Frederick, who was so delighted by the victory that he embraced Leopold personally. The Saxons then abandoned Dresden, which Fredrick and Leopold occupied on the eighteenth after demanding its unconditional surrender. The Austrians subsequently began to negotiate the peace of Dresden immediately, ultimately ending the Second Silesian War and leaving Prussia's ally, France, to conduct the rest of the war of the Austrian Succession alone.
