= Dessauer Marsch =

German military march

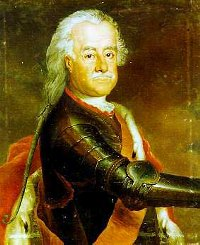
Leopold I, Prince of Anhalt-Dessau

The Dessauer Marsch (Armeemarsch I, 1b) is a slow infantry march.

It is believed that the march originated from Italy. The melody of a folk song was played for Leopold I, Prince of Anhalt-Dessau, after the Battle of Cassano (1705). He enjoyed the march so much that it had been played at his entrance to the city by the time of the Battle of Turin (1706). One of the Dessauer Marsch's most distinctive features is its elaborate trumpet solos. Until World War I, the march was the presentation march of the Infantry Regiment Fürst Leopold von Anhalt-Dessau No. 26.
