= Anna Luise Föhse =

- Princess of the Holy Roman Empire
- Born: 22 March 1677; Dessau
- Died: 5 February 1745 (aged 67)
- Spouse: Leopold I, Prince of Anhalt-Dessau
- Issue: William Gustav of Anhalt-Dessau; Leopold II, Prince of Anhalt-Dessau; Dietrich of Anhalt-Dessau; Frederick Henry Eugen of Anhalt-Dessau; Henriette Marie Louise; Louise of Anhalt-Dessau; Moritz of Anhalt-Dessau; Anna Wilhelmine of Anhalt-Dessau; Leopoldine Marie of Anhalt-Dessau; Henriette Amalie of Anhalt-Dessau
- Father: Rudolf Föhse
- Mother: Agnes Ohme

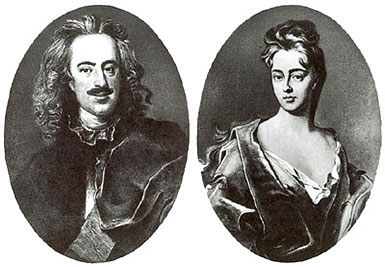
Leopold I and Anna Luise Föhse

Anna Luise Föhse, Princess of the Holy Roman Empire (22 March 1677 – 5 February 1745) was a German imperial princess. Born as a commoner, she married Leopold I, Prince of Anhalt-Dessau and was later ennobled by Leopold I, Holy Roman Emperor.

== Life ==
Anna Luise Föhse was born in Dessau, the daughter of Rudolf Föhse, the court pharmacist in Dessau, and his wife, Agnes Ohme. Her paternal grandparents were Christoph Föhse and Blandine Eleonore Schulze, and her maternal grandparents were Johannes Ohme and Anna Betken.

She was the childhood sweetheart and later morganatic wife of Prince Leopold I of Anhalt-Dessau. Despite great resistance on the part of her own father and of her mother-in-law Henriette Catherine, the daughter of Frederick Henry of Orange-Nassau, she married him in 1698 at age 22. After paying 92000Taler to the imperial treasury, she was raised to Imperial Princess by Emperor Leopold I three years later, giving her a higher rank than him. She was aided by Moses Benjamin Wulff, the court Jew and close advisor to Leopold.

In the same year 1698, he took up government. Anna Luise and Leopold had ten children together; Leopold also fathered two illegitimate children in 1733 and 1735.

Relations between Anna Luise and her mother-in-law later improved. She also had a good relationship with the Prussian royal family. Her career was the subject of the tabloid press of the day, and of several plays. She died in 1745; broken-hearted by her loss, Leopold died only two years later.

== Issue ==
1. William Gustav (1699–1737)
2. Leopold II Maximilian (1700–1751), Leopold's successor and a Prussian Field Marshal
3. Dietrich (1702–1769), also a Prussian field marshal
4. Frederick Henry (1705–1781)
5. Henriette Marie Louise (1707–1707)
6. Louise (1709–1732), married Victor Frederick, Prince of Anhalt-Bernburg
7. Maurice (1712–1760), also a Prussian field marshal
8. Anna Wilhelmine (1715–1780)
9. Leopoldine Marie (1716–1782) - married to Frederick Henry of Brandenburg-Schwedt (1709–1788)
10. Henriette Amalie (1720–1793)
