= Louise of Anhalt-Dessau (1709–1732) =

German princess

Louise

Princess Consort of Anhalt-Bernburg
- Reign: 25 November 1724 – 29 July 1732
- Born: 21 August 1709; Dessau, Anhalty, Holy Roman Empire
- Died: 29 July 1732 (aged 22); Bernburg, Anhalt, Holy Roman Empire
- Spouse: Victor Frederick, Prince of Anhalt-Bernburg
- Issue: Princess Sophie Louise, Countess of Solms-Baruth
- House: Ascania
- Father: Leopold I, Prince of Anhalt-Dessau
- Mother: Anna Louise Föhse

Louise, Princess of Anhalt-Bernburg (née Princess Louise of Anhalt-Dessau; 21 August 1709 – 29 July 1732) was the first wife and consort of Victor Frederick, Prince of Anhalt-Bernburg.

== Biography ==
Princess Louise of Anhalt-Dessau was born in Dessau on 21 August 1709 to Leopold I, Prince of Anhalt-Dessau and Anna Louise Föhse. Prior to her birth, Louise's parents had been in a morganatic marriage until her mother, who was a commoner, was raised to the rank of imperial princess by Leopold I, Holy Roman Emperor in 1701. Since their marriage was recognized as dynastic, Louise was born as a princess of Anhalt-Dessau.

On 25 November 1724 Louise married Victor Frederick, Prince of Anhalt-Bernburg, becoming the Princess Consort of Anhalt-Bernburg. She gave birth to a daughter, Princess Sophie Louise, on 29 June 1732. Due to health complications from childbirth, she died on 29 July 1732 in Bernburg. She was buried in the crypt of the Castle Church of St. Aegidien.
