= John I of Anhalt-Bernburg =

German prince

John I, Prince of Anhalt-Bernburg (1260 – 5 June 1291) was a German prince of the House of Ascania and ruler of the principality of Anhalt-Bernburg.

He was the eldest son of Bernhard I, Prince of Anhalt-Bernburg, by his wife Princess Sophie, daughter of King Abel of Denmark.

== Life ==
After the death of his father in 1287, John succeeded him as ruler of the Anhalt-Bernburg, but he had to rule jointly with his third brother, Bernhard II. The second brother, Albert, became a priest and renounced all his rights. Of the two youngest brothers, Henry also was ordained as priest and renounced his rights, whereas Rudolf was possibly dead by the time of his father's death.

John died unmarried and childless after four years of rule. He was succeeded by his brother Bernhard II, who became sole ruler.

John I of Anhalt-Bernburg House of Ascania Died: 5 June 1291
Regnal titles
Preceded by Bernhard I	Prince of Anhalt-Bernburg; 1287–1291 with Bernhard II (1287–1318)	Succeeded by Bernhard II
