= Bernhard VI of Anhalt-Bernburg =

German prince

Bernhard VI, Prince of Anhalt-Bernburg (died 2 February 1468) was a German prince of the House of Ascania and ruler of the Principality of Anhalt-Bernburg.

He was the eldest son of Otto III, Prince of Anhalt-Bernburg, by his first unknown wife.

== Life ==
He succeeded his cousin Bernhard V in the principality of Anhalt-Bernburg when he died in 1420, after being bypassed sixteen years earlier by him and his own younger brother Otto IV. Alongside his princely title, he also maintained the style Lord of Bernburg.

== Marriage and issue ==
On 21 October 1419 Bernhard married Matilda (died 1432), daughter of Protze of Querfurt-Burgscheidungen. They had two children:

1. Otto (died 1437)
2. Matilda (died 1443), married to Sigismund II, Prince of Anhalt-Dessau.

On 11 March 1434 Bernhard married a second time to Hedwig (born ca. 1410 – d. Bernburg, 14 May 1497), daughter of Duke Jan I of Żagań. This union was childless.

Bernhard's only son predeceased him. As the last male in his line, the first branch of the house of Anhalt-Bernburg became extinct. His kinsman George I, Prince of Anhalt-Dessau, inherited his lands.

Bernhard VI of Anhalt-Bernburg House of Ascania Died: 2 February 1468
Regnal titles
Preceded by Bernhard V	Prince of Anhalt-Bernburg; 1420–1468	Succeeded by George I
