= Moses Benjamin Wulff =

German-Jewish court factor (1661–1729)

- Born: 1661
- Died: 1729 (aged 67–68)
- Occupation: Court Jew (Hoffaktor)
- Known for: Hebrew printing press
- Spouse: Zipporah

Moses Benjamin Wulff (1661–1729) was a Court Jew to Prince Leopold of Anhalt-Dessau, where he dealt in political administration and diplomatic affairs of the German region.

== Biography ==
Wulff was a descendant of the Rema, Moses Isserles, through his grandfather Simon Wolf of Vilna. Simon Wolf and his family had fled the Cossacks in the 1650s and found refuge in Hamburg. One of Simon's daughters, Driezel, married Judah Wahl Katzenellenbogen, ancestor of Moses Mendelssohn, and another daughter married Shabbatai HaKohen. Simon's other son, Moses' father, Simha Bunim Benjamin Wulff (d. 1696), was a tobacco merchant. Simha Bunim feigned conversion to Catholicism fleeing the pogroms, but reverted to Judaism in Hamburg. Later he moved to Halberstadt and from there to Berlin, where he was in debt. His son Moses, called the "Tall Jew" due to his stature, married his cousin Zipporah, when both were age 17. Zipporah was the daughter of Berend (Barukh Minden) Wulff, another child of Simon who had succeeded Elias Gumpertz as Court Jew in Berlin to Frederick William, Elector of Brandenburg.

Living in Berlin, Wulff competed with Jost Liebmann, the most influential Jew in Berlin and a relative of Leffmann Behrends, for the jewel trade to the court, but their rivalry led to contention and violence. He was expelled from Brandenburg by the order of Frederick William with his property expropriated and became Court Purveyor in 1686 in Anhalt-Dessau. He first served Leopold's father John George II, Prince of Anhalt-Dessau until his death in 1693. In Anhalt-Dessau he managed the Prince's estate, currency and postal systems, military equipment, and advised and represented Leopold on diplomacy and correspondence with foreign entities such as the Holy Roman Empire in Vienna, with Augustus the Strong in Dresden and Frederick I, Duke of Gotha and Altenburg. Wulff attempted to return to Berlin, but Liebmann intervened with Frederick I of Prussia and offered to pay half of Wulff's debts so he would remain in Anhalt-Dessau.

He established a Hebrew printing press and a klaus in Dessau that published Jewish texts and prayerbooks. The press was approved by Henriette, Leopold's mother, and continued after her death until 1704. The press and the beit midrash were run at his expense. He also established a public synagogue. After 1704 the press was sold to Moses ben Avraham Avinu, who had converted to Judaism, and established in Halle, supported by Wulff. In 1716 the typographical equipment returned to Wulff and he had it passed to Israel ben Abraham, also a convert, who printed in Koethen, but since the Jewish workers could not reside in that city, he moved to Jessnitz, also within Leopold's realm. In 1742, the Jessnitz press originally established by Wulff reprinted the Guide for the Perplexed by Maimonides for the first time in centuries. It was printed under the supervision of David Fränkel the rabbi at Dessau, who included the commentaries by Efodi, Shem-Tov, and Crescas.

A close advisor to Leopold, who wanted to marry Anna Luise Föhse, Wulff was instrumental in having her elevated to the nobility by the emperor. His wife Zipporah died in 1714. His privileged position and access to both Christian and Jewish worlds helped him become a forerunner of the Haskalah, the Jewish enlightenment.

== Jewish Encyclopedia bibliography for Dessau ==
- Würdig, Chronik der Stadt Dessau, 1876, passim;
- idem, Dessau Innerhalb Eines Jahrhunderts, 1886;
- Steinthal, Die Jüd. Volksschule in Anhalt, in Zeitschrift für Gesch. der Judenin Deutschland, iv. 66;
- Kayserling, Moses Mendelssohn, passim, Leipsic, 1888;
- Max Frendenthal, Aus der Heimat Mendelssohns, passim, Berlin, 1900;
- Die Juden Unter den Annhaltischen MarkgrafenvonBrandenburg, in Allg. Zeit. des Jud. 1840, No. 13;
- D. Calm, Die Stellung der Juden in Anhalt, ib. 1866. Nos. 40 and 41.
- Cassel and Steinschneider, Jüdische Typographie, in Ersch and Gruber, Encyc. section ii., part 28, p. 84;
