= Bernhard II of Anhalt-Bernburg =

German prince

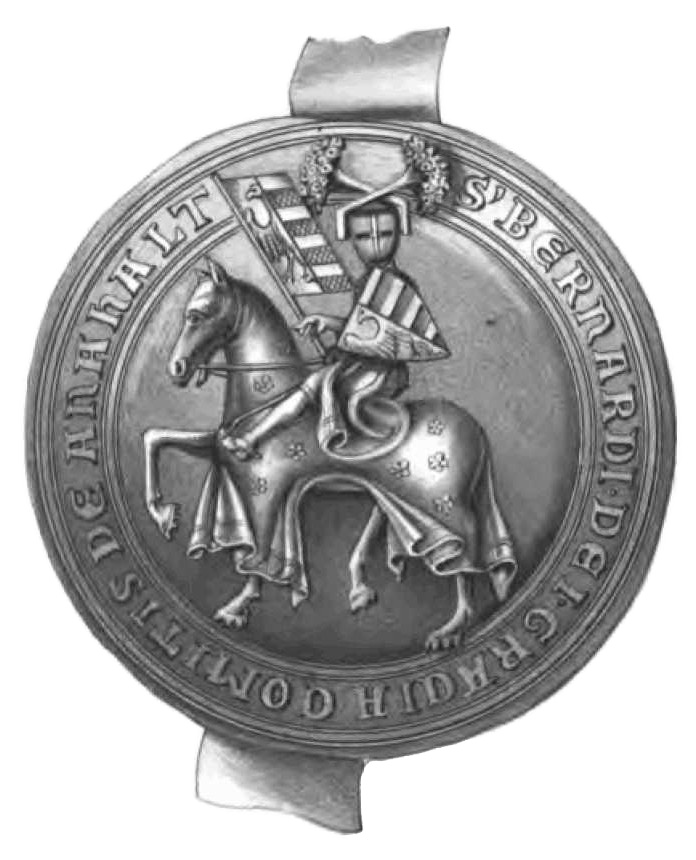
Bernhard II's Seal

Bernhard II, Prince of Anhalt-Bernburg (ca. 1260 or 1265 – aft. 26 December 1323), was a prince of the House of Ascania and ruler of the principality of Anhalt-Bernburg.

He was the third son of Bernhard I, Prince of Anhalt-Bernburg, by his wife Princess Sophie, daughter of King Abel of Denmark.

== Life ==
After the death of his father in 1287, Bernhard inherited the principality of Anhalt-Bernburg. In accordance with the family law of the House of Ascania, he was obliged to rule jointly with his older brother John I without division of their patrimony. John died four years later (1291) and Bernhard became the sole ruler.

In 1300, Bernhard adopted the title "Count of Bernburg". His princely title was confirmed the next year.

After the Anhalt-Aschersleben line became extinct in 1315, Bernhard inherited the senior princely title of Ascania as well as the title prince of Anhalt-Aschersleben. However, he could not take actual possession of his cousin Otto's lands Anhalt-Aschersleben or retain title to this fief, because the territory was lawfully expropriated by the Bishopric of Halberstadt as payment for the debts of the late Prince Otto. Bernhard agreed to this arrangement in writing in 1316; however, his descendants continued to dispute the loss of the principality for centuries. Aschersleben was finally awarded to Brandenburg-Prussia in the Treaty of Westphalia in 1648.

In Frankfurt am Main on 27 September 1320, Bernhard was created Count palatine of Saxony and Count of Brehna. He died three years later.

== Marriage and issue ==
On 27 December 1302, Bernhard married Helene (b. 1270 – d. 9 August 1315), daughter of Wizlaw II, Prince of Rügen, and widow of John III, Lord of Mecklenburg. They had three sons:

1. Bernhard III, Prince of Anhalt-Bernburg (d. 20 August 1348)
2. Henry (d. aft. 19 August 1337), a Dominican friar at Halberstadt (1330)
3. Otto, a Franciscan friar at Magdeburg (1323).

Bernhard II of Anhalt-Bernburg House of Ascania Born: ca 1260 Died: December 1323
Regnal titles
Preceded by Bernhard I	Prince of Anhalt-Bernburg; 1287–1323; With: his brother John I (1287–1291)	Succeeded by Bernhard III
Preceded by Otto II	— TITULAR — Prince of Anhalt-Aschersleben (titular 1315) permanently lost to Halberstadt in 1316	Succeeded by Bernhard III
