= Moses ben Avraham Avinu =

Czech-Austrian printer and author

Moses ben Avraham Avinu (died ca. 1733/34) was a Czech-Austrian printer and author who was a Christian convert to Judaism. His father, Jacob, was also a convert.

Moses was born at Nikolsburg (now Mikulov). He became a native of Prague, and was circumcised at Amsterdam. In 1686–87, he worked for two printers of Amsterdam, but from 1690 to 1694 seems to have owned a printing establishment and to have printed several Hebrew books, including his own Judeo-German translation of Hannover's Yewen Mezulah. He assisted with the engravings for the 1695 Passover Haggadah, which was printed by Kosman Emrich. In 1709, Moses established a printing-office in the German town of Halle, where in 1712 he printed his Tela'ot Moshe (or "Weltbeschreibung"), a Judeo-German work on the Ten Tribes, having collected the material from a number of sources, particularly from Abraham Farissol and Gedaliah ibn Yahya. He continued printing in Halle until 1714, in which year he printed Tefillat Moshe, a prayer-book, and Berechiah Berakh's Zera' Berak. Owing to anti-Christian passages in these two works, his printing-office was closed by royal order. He was imprisoned, and his books were confiscated. His coreligionists, however, helped him to escape to Amsterdam, where he printed in the same year (1714) Mesechtas Rosh ha-Shanah. He died in Amsterdam in 1733 or 1734. His children also became printers in Amsterdam.

His printing press was acquired from and supported by Moses Benjamin Wulff.
