= Margrave Frederick of Brandenburg-Schwedt =

Frederick of Brandenburg-Schwedt
- Born: 13 August 1710
- Died: 10 April 1741 (aged 30); Małujowice
- Noble family: Hohenzollern
- Father: Margrave Albert Frederick of Brandenburg-Schwedt
- Mother: Maria Dorothea of Courland

Margrave Frederick of Brandenburg-Schwedt (13 August 1710 – 10 April 1741, fell in the Battle of Mollwitz) was the second son of Margrave Albert Frederick of Brandenburg-Schwedt and his wife Maria Dorothea of Courland (1684-1743).

He initially served in the Dutch army, and later as a Colonel of the Royal Prussian Mounted Guards. From 1737, he was a Knight of the Order of Saint John. From 1741, he was commander of the Regiment Margrave Charles. That same year, he fell in the Battle of Mollwitz.

His name is mentioned on the equestrian statue of Frederick the Great on the centerline of Unter den Linden in Berlin.

Has son, with unknown "Anne", Matthias "Tice" Brandenburg (1738-1807).

== Sources ==
- F. A. W. Dünnemann: Stammbuch der brandenburgisch-preussischen regenten, p. 111, Online
- K. F. Reiche: Friedrich der Große und seine Zeit: Nach den besten Quellen dargest, p. 446,Online
