= Bernhard IV of Anhalt-Bernburg =

German prince

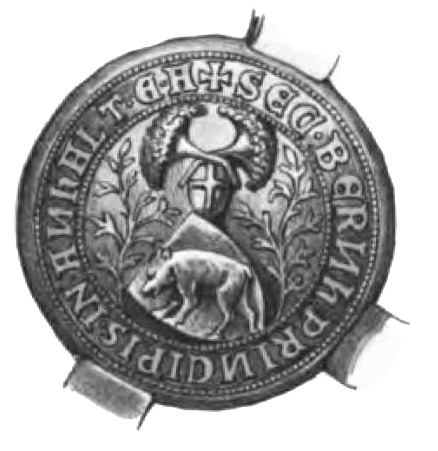
Seal of Bernhard IV

Bernhard IV, Prince of Anhalt-Bernburg (died 28 June 1354) was a German prince of the House of Ascania and ruler of the principality of Anhalt-Bernburg.

He was the eldest son of Bernhard III, Prince of Anhalt-Bernburg, by his first wife Agnes, daughter of Rudolf I, Duke of Saxe-Wittenberg and Elector of Saxony.

== Life ==
After the death of his father in 1348, Bernhard inherited the principality of Anhalt-Bernburg as sole ruler, bypassing the rights of his younger brothers Henry and Otto. He also used the title of "Margrave of Landsberg" despite the fact the margraviate had been repurchased by the House of Wettin in 1347.

Bernhard was betrothed shortly before his death to Beatrix (born Wartburg, 1 September 1339 – d. Seusslitz, 25 July 1399), daughter of Frederick II, Margrave of Meissen. The marriage apparently never took place or, if it ever did take place, was only juridical and unconsummated.

Bernhard died without issue and was succeeded by his brother Henry. Shortly after, Beatrix of Meissen took the veil and later became Abbess of Seusslitz near Weissenfels.

Bernhard IV of Anhalt-Bernburg House of Ascania Died: 28 June 1354
Regnal titles
Preceded by Bernhard III	Prince of Anhalt-Bernburg; 1348–1354	Succeeded by Henry IV
