= Leopold I of Anhalt-Dessau =

Prince of Anhalt-Dessau (1676–1747)

Leopold I
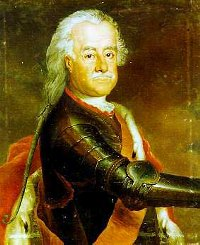

Prince of Anhalt-Dessau
- Reign: 7 August 1693 – 7 April 1747
- Predecessor: John George II
- Successor: Leopold II
- Born: 3 July 1676; Dessau, Anhalt-Dessau
- Died: 7 April 1747 (aged 70); Dessau, Anhalt-Dessau
- Spouse: Anna Louise Föhse
- Issue: William Gustav, Hereditary Prince of Anhalt-Dessau; Leopold II, Prince of Anhalt-Dessau; Prince Dietrich, later Regent; Prince Frederick Henry Eugen; Princess Henriette Marie Louise; Louise, Princess of Anhalt-Bernburg; Prince Maurice; Princess Anna Wilhelmine; Leopoldine Marie, Margravine of Brandenburg-Schwedt; Princess Henriette Amalie; John Georg Henry von Berenhorst; Karl Franz von Berenhorst
- House: Ascania
- Father: John George II, Prince of Anhalt-Dessau
- Mother: Henriette Catherine of Nassau

Leopold I, Prince of Anhalt-Dessau (3 July 1676 – 7 April 1747) was a German prince of the House of Ascania and ruler of the Principality of Anhalt-Dessau from 1693 to 1747. He was also a Generalfeldmarschall in the Prussian Army. Nicknamed "the Old Dessauer" (German: der alte Dessauer), he possessed good abilities as a field commander, but was mainly remembered as a talented drillmaster who modernized the Prussian infantry.

Appointed by Frederick I to the rank of field marshal in 1712, Leopold distinguished himself for his success during the War of the Spanish Succession. He was later appointed the commander of the Prussian-Saxon army during the Great Northern War against Sweden. Leopold was a personal friend of Frederick William I. The last great achievement of his military career was commanding the Prussian troops to victory over the Saxons at the Battle of Kesselsdorf in 1745 during the Second Silesian War.

== Early life ==
Leopold was born in Dessau as the ninth of ten children (and the younger of only two sons) of John George II, Prince of Anhalt-Dessau, by his wife Henriette Catherine, daughter of Frederick Henry, Prince of Orange. An older brother had died well before Leopold was born.

From his earliest youth he devoted himself to military pursuits, for which he educated himself both physically and mentally. He became colonel of a Prussian regiment in 1693, and in the same year inherited his own principality; for the remainder of his long life, he performed the duties of a sovereign prince and a Prussian officer simultaneously.

Leopold's first campaign was that of 1695 in the Netherlands, in which he was present at the Siege of Namur. He remained in the field to the end of the war of 1697, the affairs of the principality being managed chiefly by his mother, the Dowager Princess Henriette Katharina (in fact, she had been acting as regent since the death of his father until he reached adulthood the same year, but continued in charge of the government of Anhalt-Dessau for some time after he attained his majority).

== Military career ==
=== War of the Spanish Succession ===
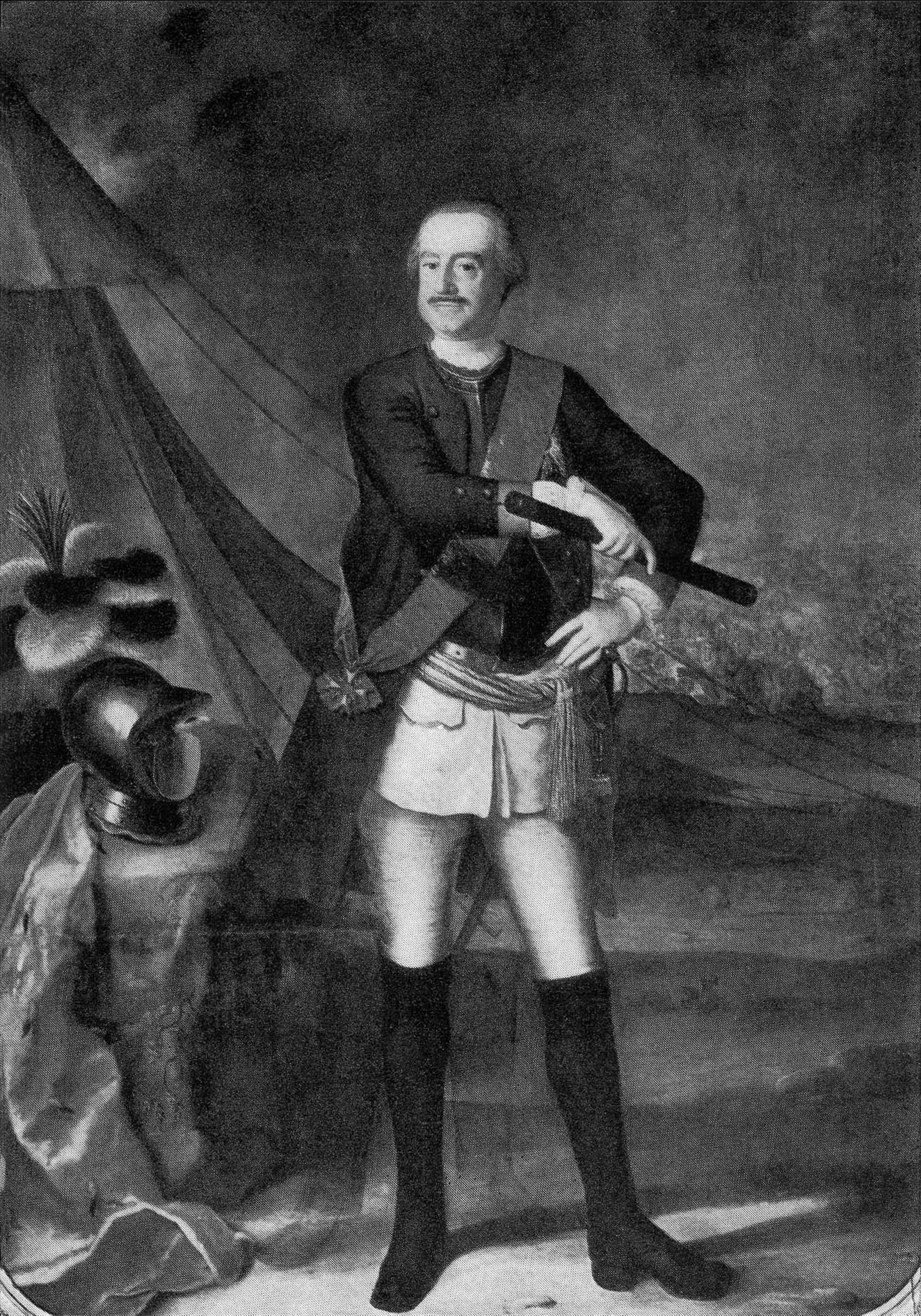
Portrait of Leopold I by Georg Lisiewski, 1741

Leopold's career as a soldier in important commands began with the outbreak of the War of the Spanish Succession in 1701. He had many improvements made in the Prussian army, notably the introduction of the iron ramrod about 1700, and he now took the field at the head of a Prussian corps on the Rhine, serving at the sieges of Kaiserswerth and Venlo in 1702. In the following year, having obtained the rank of lieutenant-general, Leopold took part in the Siege of Bonn and fought as part of the Battle of Hochstadt, in which the Austrians and their Prussian allies were defeated by the French under Marshal Claude-Louis-Hector de Villars on 20 September 1703. In the campaign of 1704 the Prussian contingent served first under Louis William, Margrave of Baden-Baden, then Prince Eugene of Savoy, and fought at Blenheim.

In 1705 Leopold was sent with a Prussian corps to join Prince Eugene in Italy, and on 16 August fought at the Battle of Cassano. In the Battle of Turin, he was the first to enter the hostile entrenchments (7 September 1706). He served in one more campaign in Italy, and then served under Eugene to join Marlborough in the Netherlands, being present in 1709 at the Siege of Tournai and the Battle of Malplaquet.

In 1710 Leopold succeeded to the command of the entire Prussian contingent at the French front, and in 1712, he was made a field marshal at the particular request of the crown prince of Prussia, Frederick William, who had served with him as a volunteer. Shortly before this he had executed a coup de main on the castle of Moers, which had been held by the Dutch in defiance of the claims of the Prussian king to its possession. The operation was effected with absolute precision and the castle was seized without a shot being fired. In the earlier part of the reign of Frederick William I, the prince of Dessau was one of the most influential members of the Prussian governing circle.

=== Great Northern War ===
Although Prussia was hostile to Sweden, the Prussians were reluctant to participate in the Great Northern War. Only after the Russians destroyed most of the Swedish army did Prussia enter the war in 1715. Leopold accompanied the king to the front, commanded an army of 40,000 men, and defeated the much smaller force of Charles XII of Sweden in a hard-fought battle on the island of Rügen on 16 November in alliance with the Danish army of Stralsund. In peacetime, and especially after a court quarrel and duel with General Friedrich Wilhelm von Grumbkow in 1725, he devoted himself to the training of the Prussian army.

=== Training the Prussian Army ===
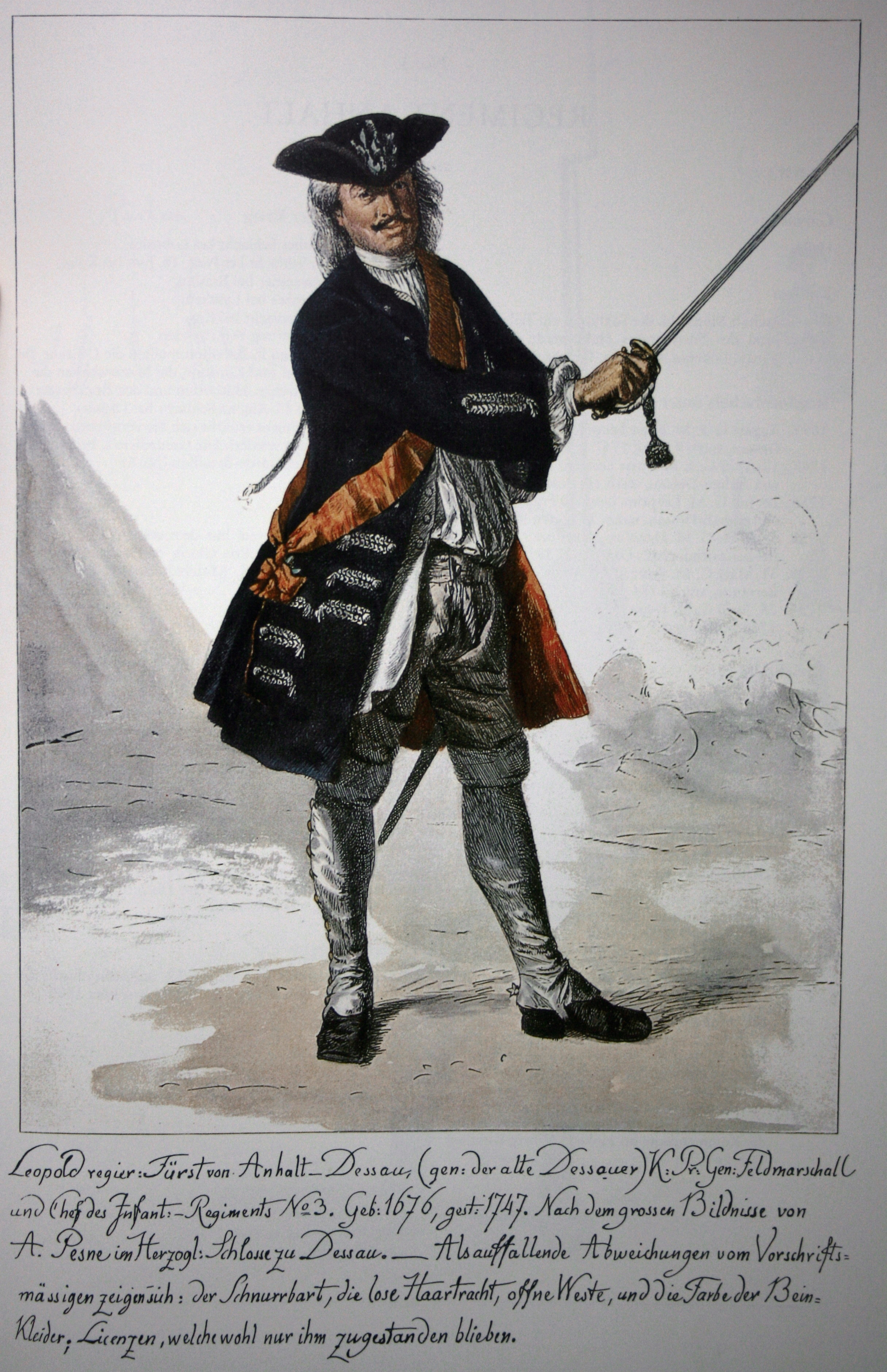
"The Old Dessauer" (German: der alte Dessauer), was a minor field commander but a talented drill master who modernized the Prussian infantry.

Although the reputation gained by the Prussian army in the wars fought between 1675 and 1715 was a good one, it was still considered one of the minor military forces in Europe by 1740, when the War of the Austrian Succession broke out. Leopold's outstanding achievement just before this time was his training of the Prussian infantry. The "Old Dessauer" was one of the sternest disciplinarians in an age of stern discipline, and the technical training of the infantry under his hand made the Prussian infantry into a formidable fighting force whose effectiveness had not yet been demonstrated. Leopold was essentially an infantry soldier; in his time, artillery usually did not decide battles, but he nonetheless chose to neglect the cavalry service, with results that manifested themselves at the Battle of Mollwitz in 1741. Frederick II of Prussia led the cavalry himself at the battles of Hohenfriedberg in 1745 and Leuthen in 1757, but had it not been for the supporting infantry trained by Leopold he would never have had the opportunity to do so.

Thus Leopold, with the steadfast support of King Frederick William I of Prussia, himself one of the greatest drillmasters of Europe, turned to good account the twenty years following the peace with Sweden. During this time two incidents in his career deserve special mention: firstly, his intervention in the case of the crown prince Frederick, who was court-martialed for desertion, but due to his efforts reinstated in the Prussian army; and secondly, his successful role in the War of the Polish Succession on the Rhine, where he served under his old chief Eugene of Savoy and held the office of Field Marshal of the Empire.

=== Service under Frederick the Great ===
With the death of Frederick William in 1740, Frederick the Great succeeded to the Prussian throne, and a few months later initiated the invasion and conquest of Silesia, the first action in the long Silesian Wars and the test of Leopold's lifelong efforts to improve the effectiveness of the Prussian army. The prince himself was not often employed in the king's own army, though his sons held high commands under Frederick. The king, indeed, found Leopold somewhat difficult to manage, and the prince spent most of the campaigning years up to 1745 in command of an army of observation on the Saxon frontier.

Early in that year his wife died. Leopold was now over seventy, but his last campaign was destined to be the most successful of his long career. A combined effort of the Austrians and Saxons to retrieve the disasters of the summer by a winter campaign towards Berlin itself led to a hurried concentration of the Prussians. Frederick from Silesia checked the Austrian main army and hastened towards Dresden. But before Frederick arrived, Leopold had decided the war by means of his overwhelming victory over Saxons at Kesselsdorf on 14 December 1745. It was his habit to pray before battle, for he was a devout Lutheran. On this last field his words were, "O Lord God, let me not be disgraced in my old days. Or if Thou wilt not help me, do not help these scoundrels, but leave us to try it ourselves." Leopold's career ended with this great victory; when Frederick arrived after the battle, he embraced the Old Dessauer personally. Leopold retired from active service, and the short remainder of his life was spent at Dessau.

He was succeeded as prince of Anhalt-Dessau by his son, Leopold II Maximilian. Another of his sons, Dietrich of Anhalt-Dessau, was a Prussian general, but the most famous of his sons was Moritz of Anhalt-Dessau.

== Marriage and issue ==
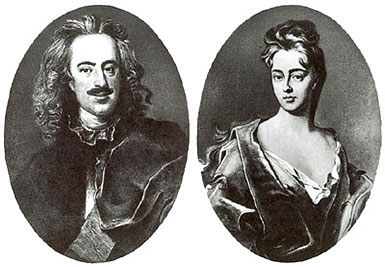
Leopold I and Anna Föhse

As a young prince, Leopold fell in love with Anna Louise Föhse (Fösen according to some sources) (Dessau, 22 March 1677 – Dessau, 5 February 1745), an apothecary's daughter in Dessau. His mother, the Dowager Princess, tried to break up the relationship, sending her son abroad for an extended travel, but to no avail. One year after officially becoming an adult in 1697, he married his beloved Anna Louise in Dessau on 8 September 1698, forming a union that was morganatic until the imperial decree of 29 December 1701. The couple had ten children:

1. William Gustav (Dessau, 20 June 1699 – Dessau, 16 December 1737), Hereditary Prince of Anhalt-Dessau.
2. Leopold II Maximilian (Dessau, 25 December 1700 – Dessau, 16 December 1751), Prince of Anhalt-Dessau.
3. Dietrich (Dessau, 2 August 1702 – Dessau, 2 December 1769), later Regent.
4. Frederick Henry Eugen (Dessau, 27 December 1705 – Dessau, 2 March 1781).
5. Henriette Marie Louise (Dessau, 3 August 1707 – Dessau, 7 August 1707).
6. Louise (Dessau, 21 August 1709 – Bernburg, 29 July 1732), married on 25 November 1724 to Victor Frederick, Prince of Anhalt-Bernburg.
7. Maurice (Dessau, 31 October 1712 – Dessau, 11 April 1760).
8. Anna Wilhelmine (Dessau, 13 June 1715 – Dessau, 2 April 1780).
9. Leopoldine Marie (Oranienbaum, 12 December 1716 – Kolberg, 27 January 1782), married on 13 February 1739 to Frederick Henry, Margrave of Brandenburg-Schwedt.
10. Henriette Amalie (Dessau, 7 December 1720 – Dessau, 5 December 1793).

On 29 December 1701 Anna Louise was created an Imperial Princess (German: Reichsfürstin) by the Emperor Leopold I, who also declared that their children would be considered princes and princesses of Anhalt (as all of them arguably, and the two born before this decree certainly, would not have otherwise) and would enjoy all the rights that other princes of the Empire enjoy. King Frederick I of Prussia extended his personal guarantee on 12 March 1702, promising to recognize the rights of the issue of this marriage. The agnates of all the branches of Anhalt also gave their agreement a few days later, on 21 March.

Leopold's court Jew Moses Benjamin Wulff played an important role in the ennobling of Anna.

Leopold and Anna Louise enjoyed a long and happy marriage, and the princess acquired an influence over her husband that she never ceased to exert on behalf of his subjects. After the death of Leopold's mother she performed the duties of regent when he was absent on campaign. Often, too, she accompanied him into the field.

In later life, however, Leopold sired two illegitimate sons by one Sophie Eleonore Söldner (Ellrich, 7 September 1710 – Dessau, 16 September 1779):

1. John Georg Henry von Berenhorst (Sandersleben, 26 October 1733 – Dessau, 30 October 1814), who married first in Zöberitz on 8 May 1781 to Katharina Christiane Maria Otto, but divorced in 1783; in Köthen on 26 October 1783 he married for a second time to Henriette Christine Karoline von Bülow (Predel, 30 June 1765 – Dessau, 29 August 1813), with whom he had six children, one son, George John (whose descendants in the male line became extinct in 1952), and five daughters: Louise Sophie, Eugenie Johanne (d. in infancy), Wilhelmine Henriette, Klara Hedwig, and Thekla Pauline, who, from her first marriage to Julius, Freiherr von Richthofen, was a great-grandmother of Manfred von Richthofen.
2. Karl Franz von Berenhorst (Sandersleben, 1 March 1735 – Dessau, 6 June 1804), married in Schweinitz on 7 February 1785 to Johanne Eleonore Scholtz; their two sons, Henry Karl and George Franz, were killed in battle; neither of them married or had children.

== Ancestry ==
Ancestors of Leopold I of Anhalt-Dessau

8. John George I, Prince of Anhalt-Dessau (1567–1618)
4. John Casimir, Prince of Anhalt-Dessau (1596–1660)
9. Dorothea of Simmern (1581–1631)
2. John George II, Prince of Anhalt-Dessau (1627–1693)
10. Maurice, Landgrave of Hesse-Kassel (1572–1632)
5. Agnes of Hesse-Kassel (1606–1650)
11. Juliane of Nassau-Siegen (1587–1643)
1. Leopold I, Prince of Anhalt-Dessau (1676–1747)
12. William the Silent (1533–1584)
6. Frederick Henry, Prince of Orange (1584–1647)
13. Louise de Coligny (1555–1620)
3. Henriette Catherine of Nassau (1637–1708)
14. John Albert I of Solms-Braunfels (1563–1623)
7. Amalia of Solms-Braunfels (1602–1675)
15. Agnes of Sayn-Wittgenstein (1568–1617)

== See also ==
- Statue of Leopold I, Prince of Anhalt-Dessau, Berlin
- Dessauer Marsch

== Sources ==
- Varnhagen von Ense, Preussische biographische Denkmale, vol. ii. (3rd ed., 1872); Militär Konversations-Lexikon, vol. ii. (Leipzig, 1833).
- Anon., Fürst Leopold I. von Anhalt und seine Söhne (Dessau, 1852).
- Karl Friedrich Pauli (German Wikipedia), Leben grosser Heiden, vol. vi.
- Leopold von Orlich (German Wikipedia), Prinz Moritz von Anhalt-Dessau (Berlin, 1842);
- Crousatz, Militärische Denkwürdigkeiten des Fürsten Leopold von Anhalt-Dessau (1875).
- supplements to Militär Wochenblatt (1878 and 1889);
- Ferdinand Siebigk, Selbstbiographie des Fürsten Leopold von Anhalt-Dessau (Dessau, 1860 and 1876).
- Wilhelm Hosäus (German Wikipedia), Zur Biographie des Fürsten Leopold von Anhalt-Dessau (Dessau, 1876).
- Ludwig Würdig, Des Alten Dessauers Leben und Taten (3rd ed., Dessau, 1903).
- Briefe König Friedrich Wilhelms I. an den Fürsten L. (Berlin, 1905).

Leopold I of Anhalt-Dessau House of Ascania Born: 3 July 1676 Died: 7 April 1747
Regnal titles
Preceded by John George II	Prince of Anhalt-Dessau; 1693–1747	Succeeded by Leopold II
