= Victor Frederick, Prince of Anhalt-Bernburg =

Prince of Anhalt-Bernburg (1700–1765)

Victor Frederick
- Prince of Anhalt-Bernburg
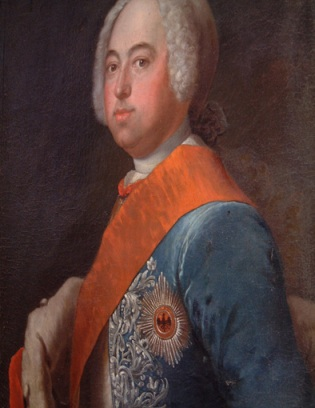
- Portrait of Victor Frederick, c. 1730

Prince of Anhalt-Bernburg
- Reign: 22 April 1721–18 May 1765
- Predecessor: Karl Frederick
- Successor: Frederick Albert
- Born: 20 September 1700; Bernburg, Anhalt-Bernburg, Holy Roman Empire
- Died: 18 May 1765 (aged 64); Bernburg, Anhalt-Bernburg, Holy Roman Empire
- Spouse: Louise of Anhalt-Dessau; Albertine of Brandenburg-Schwedt; Konstanze Friederike Schmidt
- Issue Detail: Sophie Louise, Countess of Solms-Baruth; Frederick Albert, Prince of Anhalt-Bernburg; Charlotte Wilhelmine, Princess of Schwarzburg-Sondershausen; Marie Karoline; Fredericka Auguste Sophie, Princess of Anhalt-Zerbst; Christine Elisabeth Albertine, Princess of Schwarzburg-Sondershausen; Louise Fredericka Wilhelmine, Countess of Solms-Tecklenburg
Names
- Victor Frederick; German: Viktor Friedrich
- House: Ascania
- Father: Karl Frederick
- Mother: Sophie Albertine of Solms-Sonnenwalde

Victor Frederick of Anhalt-Bernburg (20 September 1700–18 May 1765), was a German prince of the House of Ascania. He was Reigning prince of the principality of Anhalt-Bernburg from 1721 to 1765.

== Life ==
Victor Frederick was born on 20 September 1700 in Bernburg as the second (but eldest and only surviving) son of Karl Frederick, Prince of Anhalt-Bernburg, by his first wife Countess Sophie Albertine of Solms-Sonnewalde, daughter of George Frederick, Count of Solms-Sonnewalde.

After the death of his father in 1721, Victor Frederick succeeded him in Anhalt-Bernburg. As a Rittmeister and Capitan of the Prussian army, he was made a knight of the Order of the Black Eagle in 1722.

Victor Frederick showed a special interest for mining and metallurgy and often visited the mines in the Harz.

He died on May 18, 1765 in Bernburg, leaving behind 7 children, including Frederick Albert, who succeeded him. Frederick Albert reigned until 1796.

== Marriages and issue ==
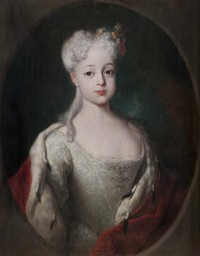
Louise of Anhalt-Dessau, first wife of Victor Frederick.

In Dessau on 25 November 1724 Victor Frederick married Princess Louise of Anhalt-Dessau (b. Dessau, 21 August 1709 - d. Bernburg, 29 July 1732), daughter of Leopold I, Prince of Anhalt-Dessau. They had one daughter:

1. Sophie Louise (b. Bernburg, 29 June 1732 - d. Schloss Baruth, 6 October 1786), married on 20 May 1753 to Frederick, Count of Solms-Baruth.

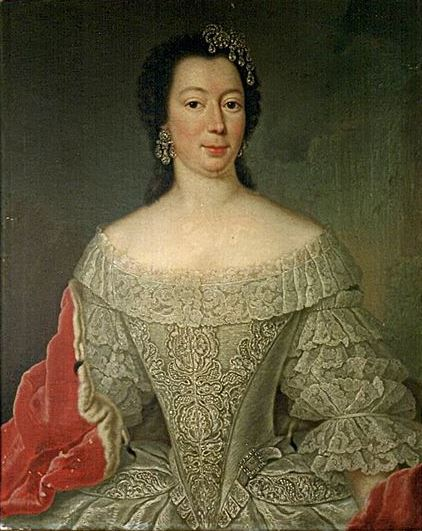
His second wife, Albertine of Brandenburg-Schwedt.

In Potsdam on 22 May 1733 Victor Frederick married for a second time to Albertine of Brandenburg-Schwedt (b. Berlin, 21 April 1712 - d. Bernburg, 7 September 1750), daughter of Margrave Albert Frederick of Brandenburg-Schwedt. They had five children:

1. Frederick Albert, Prince of Anhalt-Bernburg (b. Bernburg, 15 August 1735 - d. Ballenstedt, 9 April 1796).
2. Charlotte Wilhelmine (b. Bernburg, 25 August 1737 - d. Sondershausen, 26 April 1777), married on 4 February 1760 to Christian Günther III, Prince of Schwarzburg-Sondershausen.
3. Marie Karoline (b. Bernburg, 9 June 1739 - d. Bernburg, 11 June 1739).
4. Fredericka Auguste Sophie (b. Ballenstedt, 28 August 1744 - d. Coswig, 12 April 1827), married on 27 May 1764 to Frederick Augustus, Prince of Anhalt-Zerbst.
5. Christine Elisabeth Albertine (b. Bernburg, 14 November 1746 - d. Coswig, 18 May 1823), married on 27 April 1762 to Augustus II, Prince of Schwarzburg-Sondershausen.

In Bernburg on 13 November 1750 Victor Frederick married morganatically for a third time to Konstanze Fredericka Schmidt, a commoner. She was ennobled and obtain the title of Baroness of Bähr (German: Frau von Bähr) in 1752, shortly before the birth of their only daughter:

1. Louise Fredericka Wilhelmine of Bähr (b. 4 May 1752 - d. 6 July 1820), married on 12 November 1768 to Otto Henry Louis, Count of Solms-Tecklenburg.

Royal monogram.

Preceded by Karl Frederick	Prince of Anhalt-Bernburg; 1721–1765	Succeeded by Frederick Albert
