= Henry IV of Anhalt-Bernburg =

German prince

Henry IV, Prince of Anhalt-Bernburg (died 7 July 1374) was a German prince of the House of Ascania and ruler of the principality of Anhalt-Bernburg.

He was the second son of Bernhard III, Prince of Anhalt-Bernburg, by his first wife Agnes, daughter of Rudolf I, Duke of Saxe-Wittenberg.

== Life ==
Bypassed by his older brother Bernhard IV as ruler of Anhalt-Bernburg, he only assumed rule of the principality when Bernhard died in 1354. In addition to his princely title, he also adopted the style "Lord of Bernburg".

== Marriage and issue ==
Henry married Sophie, possibly a member of the House of Stolberg. They had three children:

1. Bernhard V, Prince of Anhalt-Bernburg (died 24 June 1420)
2. Rudolph (III) (died 28 November 1406), Bishop of Halberstadt (1401–1406)
3. Adelheid (died aft. 2 February 1374), Abbess of Gernrode (1348–1374).

After his death, his son Bernhard was bypassed in his rights over Bernburg in favor of Henry's younger half-brother Otto, who succeeded him.

Henry IV of Anhalt-Bernburg House of Ascania Died: 7 July 1374
Regnal titles
Preceded by Bernhard IV	Prince of Anhalt-Bernburg; 1354–1374	Succeeded by Otto III
