= Prince Frederick Henry Eugen of Anhalt-Dessau =

Prince of house is Ascania

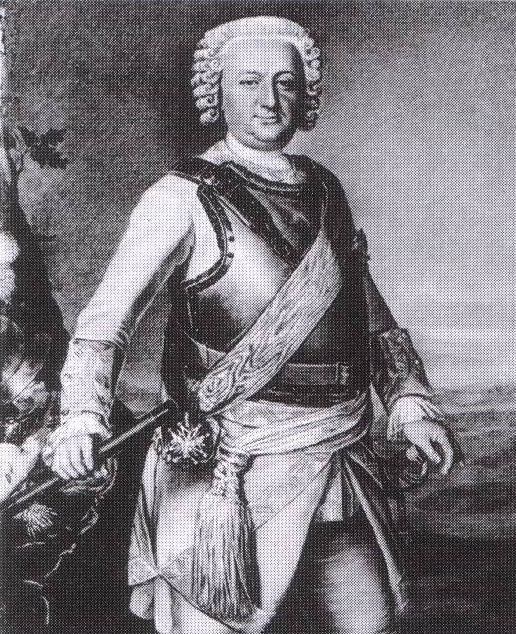
Prince Frederick Henry Eugen

Frederick Henry Eugen of Anhalt-Dessau (27 December 1705 in Dessau – 2 March 1781 in Dessau) was a German prince of the House of Ascania from the Anhalt-Dessau branch.

He was the fourth son of Leopold I, Prince of Anhalt-Dessau, by his morganatic wife Anna Louise Föhse.

== Life ==
In 1717, at age 12, Eugen joined the Prussian army. From 1733 to 1739 he was Chief of the Corps of the Prussian Hussar's regiment No. 1 (regiment of Pferde). In 1743 he left the Prussian service and joined the Austrian army under the command of Prince Charles Alexander of Lorraine as a volunteer on the Rhine. In 1746 he joined the army of the Electorate of Saxony, where he became a Governor of Wittenberg and later Generalfeldmarschall.

He never married or had children and never took part in the government of Anhalt-Dessau.

== Literature ==
- Eduard Lange (1853). Die soldaten Friedrich's des Grossen. H. Mendelssohn. p. 139.
