= William Gustav of Anhalt-Dessau =

William Gustav
- Hereditary Prince of Anhalt-Dessau
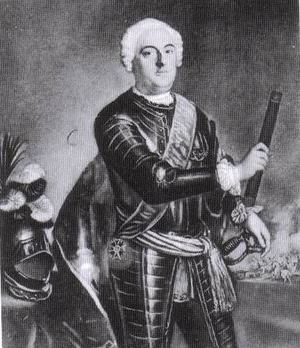
- Portrait c. 1720–1737
- Born: 20 June 1699; Dessau, Anhalt-Dessau
- Died: 16 December 1737 (aged 38); Dessau, Anhalt-Dessau
- morganatic wife: Johanna Sophia Herre
- House: Ascania
- Father: Leopold I, Prince of Anhalt-Dessau
- Mother: Anna Louise Föhse

William Gustav of Anhalt-Dessau (20 June 1699 – 16 December 1737) was a German prince of the House of Ascania and heir to the principality of Anhalt-Dessau.

He was born in Dessau, the eldest son of Leopold I, Prince of Anhalt-Dessau, by his morganatic wife Anna Louise Föhse.

== Life ==
In 1706, the eight-year-old William Gustav was appointed a captain and accompanied his father in his campaign against France in 1712. In 1713, he obtained the post of chief of the Prussian regiment of gene d'armes. In 1719, he participated in the Turk's War in Hungary. Between 1734 and 1735, he served under Prince Eugene of Savoy as a volunteer in the war against France.

== Marriage and issue ==
William Gustav fell in love with Johanna Sophia Herre (surname Herr or Herrin according to some sources) (b. Dessau, 8 July 1706 - d. Dessau, 5 June 1795), a commoner. They married secretly in Dessau on the night of 14 March 1726, after which she lived in Kleckewitz. They had nine children:

1. William ["Count of Anhalt" from 19 September 1749] (b. Hornburg, 15 March 1727 - killed in action at Torgau, 3 November 1760), a Prussian lieutenant-colonel.
2. Leopold Louis ["Count of Anhalt" from 19 September 1749] (b. Kleckewitz, 28 February 1729 - d. Liegnitz, 28 April 1795), a Prussian general and bearer of the Order of the Black Eagle; married on 1 November 1763 to Karoline Elisabeth Antoinette von Printzen (b. Havelberg, 18 August 1734 - d. Liegnitz, 8 April 1799); they had one daughter:
  1. Countess Wilhelmine Sophie Karoline of Anhalt (b. Halle, 15 January 1765 - d. Liegnitz, 9 March 1804), married on 6 June 1797 to Julius von Bonge (d. 1820).
3. Gustav ["Count of Anhalt" from 19 September 1749] (b. Kleckewitz, 26 May 1730 - killed in action at Breslau, 22 November 1757), a grenadier captain.
4. Johanna Sophie ["Countess of Anhalt" from 19 September 1749] (b. Kleckewitz, 9 July 1731 - d. Dessau, 15 July 1786), Abbess of Mosigkau.
5. Frederick ["Count of Anhalt" from 19 September 1749] (b. Kleckewitz, 21 May 1732 - d. St. Petersburg, 2 June 1794), General Adjutant of the Empress Catherine II the Great of Russia.
6. Wilhelmine ["Countess of Anhalt" from 19 September 1749] (b. Kleckewitz, 12 February 1734 - d. Bosfeld, 4 June 1781), married on 8 April 1772 to August Wolfrath von Campen, illegitimate son of Albert Wolfgang, Count of Schaumburg-Lippe.
7. Albert ["Count of Anhalt" from 19 September 1749] (b. Kleckewitz, 24 June 1735 - d. Dessau, 26 April 1802), a Prussian major-general; married on 24 June 1764 to Sophie Luise Henriette von Wedel (b. Eilenstedt, 27 March 1750 - d. Halberstadt, 2 July 1773). They had five children:
  1. Countess Frederica Ferdinandine Wilhelmine of Anhalt (b. Halberstadt, 17 June 1765 - d. Halberstadt, 1 June 1767).
  2. Count Frederick Henry Leopold Albert of Anhalt (b. Halberstadt, 6 August 1766 - d. Magdeburg, after 1810?).
  3. Countess Louise Karoline Casimira Sophie of Anhalt (b. Halberstadt, 30 September 1767 - d. Potsdam, 4 April 1842), married in Dessau on 20 May 1787 to Count Franz John George of Waldersee, illegitimate son of Prince Leopold III of Anhalt-Dessau.
  4. Count Frederick Henry William of Anhalt (b. Halberstadt, 31 July 1769 - d. Breslau, 25 February 1792).
  5. Count Augustus Gustav of Anhalt (b. Halberstadt, 19 February 1772 - d. Elbing, 3 January 1823).
8. Henry ["Count of Anhalt" from 19 September 1749] (b. Kleckewitz, 4 September 1736 - d. Dresden, 14 September 1758), a Prussian captain.
9. Leopoldine Anna ["Countess of Anhalt" from 19 September 1749] (b. posthumously, Kleckewitz, 26 January 1738 - d. Berlin, 26 September 1808), married on 10 November 1773 to George Dietrich von Pfuhl (1723–1782).

In 1737, during Johanna Sophia's ninth and last pregnancy, William Gustav came down with smallpox and, wanting to see her before his death, he had her and his eldest son brought to Dessau, revealed the secret marriage and children to his father, and entrusted their care to him. Prince Leopold raised the eldest son at his court and gave a secret pension to the widow and her other children in Kleckewitz. Leopold was succeeded by his younger son Leopold Maximiliam, who gave his brother's widow a house in Dessau and obtained for his children from the Emperor the title of "Counts of Anhalt" on 19 September 1749, without any rights of succession.

At the same time, King Frederick II of Prussia raised the two illegitimate sons whom William Gustav sired with one "Henriette Marianne Schardius" to the rank of nobility with the surname "of Anhalt":

1. Karl Philipp of Anhalt (b. 1732 - d. 9 May 1806), a Prussian major-general; he married Frederica Albertine von Wedel and had two sons, Frederick William Karl (d. young) and William Karl Frederick (killed in a duel), and a daughter, Auguste, who married a man with the surname Binder.
2. Henry William of Anhalt (b. 4 November 1735 - d. 12 February 1801), a Prussian general; on 10 December 1768 he married Caroline Frederica von Wedel; they had a son, Frederick William (whose descendants became extinct in the male line in 1863), and a daughter, Christiane Frederica Wilhelmine, who after the divorce of her first husband in 1797 married for a second time to Jules Gabriel of Seigneux, later the possible father of the eldest illegitimate son of Princess Juliane of Saxe-Coburg-Saalfeld (by marriage Grand Duchess Anna Feodorovna of Russia); this second marriage also ended in divorce in 1805.
