= Margrave Albert Frederick of Brandenburg-Schwedt =

Prussian Commander and Margrave of Brandenburg-Schwedt

Albert Frederick of Brandenburg-Schwedt
- Born: 24 January 1672; Berlin
- Died: 21 June 1731 (aged 59); Friedrichsfelde Palace
- Spouse: Maria Dorothea of Courland
- Issue: Charles Frederick Albert, Margrave of Brandenburg-Schwedt; Anna Sophie Charlotte, Duchess of Saxe-Eisenach; Margrave Frederick of Brandenburg-Schwedt; Albertine, Princess of Anhalt-Bernburg; Margrave Frederick William of Brandenburg-Schwedt
- House: Hohenzollern
- Father: Frederick William, Elector of Brandenburg
- Mother: Sophia Dorothea of Schleswig-Holstein-Sonderburg-Glücksburg

Albert Frederick, Prince of Prussia, Margrave of Brandenburg-Schwedt (24 January 1672 – 21 June 1731), was a Lieutenant General in the army of the Electorate of Brandenburg-Prussia (later Kingdom of Prussia) and Grand Master of the Order of Saint John. In his lifetime he held the courtesy title of Margrave of Brandenburg. His elder brother Philip William held the town and lands of Schwedt.

== Life ==
Albert Frederick was born in Berlin, a son of Elector Frederick William of Brandenburg and his second wife Sophia Dorothea. His brother Philip William was from 1692 to 1711 Governor of Magdeburg. Albrecht Frederick joined the Prussian army as a volunteer in 1689, at the beginning of the War of the Palatine Succession against France. On 10 May 1692 he became head of a cavalry regiment and on 14 March 1693, he was promoted to major general. In 1694 he participated in the campaign in Italy and was on 9 March 1695, he was promoted to lieutenant general. The Margrave became in 1696 Grand Master of the Order of Saint John (Bailiwick of Brandenburg) and, on 17 January 1701, one of the first knights of the Order of the Black Eagle.

Beginning 14 February 1702 he fought against France as head of an infantry regiment in the War of Spanish Succession as the commander of the Prussian corps in the Netherlands. In November of that year he had to leave this post because of illness. In 1706, he was appointed governor in Pomerania. He died at Friedrichsfelde Palace, aged 59.

== Marriage and issue ==
On 31 October 1703 Albert Frederick married with Princess Maria Dorothea Ketteler of Courland (1684–1743), daughter of Frederick Casimir, Duke of Courland. They had the following children:

- Frederick of Brandenburg-Schwedt (9 August 1704 – 5 June 1707) died young.
- Charles Frederick Albert, Margrave of Brandenburg-Schwedt (1705–1762)
- Anna Sophie Charlotte of Brandenburg-Schwedt (1706–1751); married in 1723 Wilhelm Heinrich, Duke of Saxe-Eisenach (1691–1741)
- Luise Wilhelmine of Brandenburg-Schwedt (11 May 1709 –19 February 1726) died unmarried and without issue.
- Frederick of Brandenburg-Schwedt (1710–1741), died in the Battle of Mollwitz as a Prussian colonel
- Sophie Friederike Albertine of Brandenburg-Schwedt (1712–1750); married in 1733 Victor Frederick, Prince of Anhalt-Bernburg (1700–1765)
- Frederick William (1715–1744).

Margrave Albert Frederick of Brandenburg-Schwedt House of Hohenzollern Born: 24 January 1672 Died: 21 June 1731
Preceded by Charles Philip	Herrenmeister (Grand Master) of the Order of Saint John; 1696–1731	Succeeded by Charles Albert
