= Prince Moritz of Anhalt-Dessau =

German general

Prince Moritz
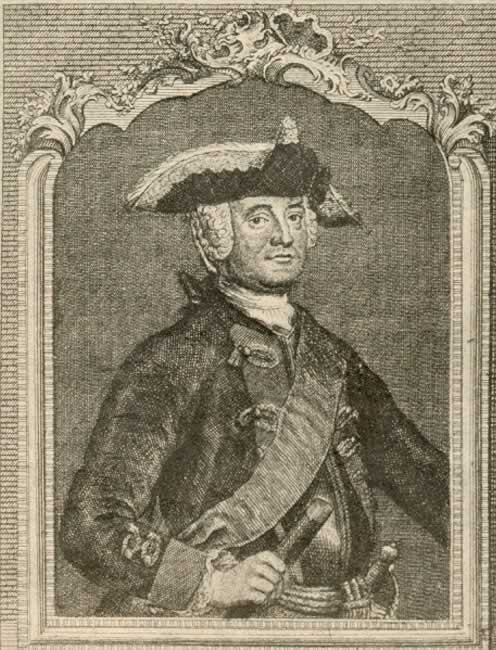
- Engraving of Prince Moritz
- Born: 31 October 1712; Dessau
- Died: 11 April 1760 (aged 47); Dessau
- House: Ascania
- Father: Leopold I, Prince of Anhalt-Dessau
- Mother: Anna Louise Föhse

Maurice of Anhalt-Dessau (31 October 1712 in Dessau - 11 April 1760 in Dessau), was a German prince of the House of Ascania from the Anhalt-Dessau branch. He was also a Prussian soldier and Generalfeldmarschall.

== Early life ==
Maurice was the fifth son of Leopold I, Prince of Anhalt-Dessau, by his morganatic wife, Anna Louise Föhse.

== Military career ==
Maurice entered the Prussian army in 1725, and saw his first service as a volunteer in the War of the Polish Succession (1734–35). In the later years of the reign of Frederick William I of Prussia, he held important commands. In the Silesian wars of Frederick the Great, Maurice, the ablest of old Leopold's sons, greatly distinguished himself, especially at the Battle of Hohenfriedberg in 1745.

At Kesselsdorf it was the wing led by the young Maurice that carried the Austrian lines and won his father Leopold's last campaign. In the years of peace preceding the Seven Years' War, Moritz was employed by Frederick the Great in the colonization of the wastelands of Pomerania and the Oder Valley. When the king took the field again in 1756, Maurice was in command of one of the columns which hemmed in the Saxon army in the lines of Pirna, and he received the surrender of Rutowski's force after the failure of the Austrian attempts at relief.

During the next year Maurice suffered a change in his fortunes. At the Battle of Kolin he led the left wing, which, through a misunderstanding with the King, was prematurely drawn into action and failed hopelessly. In the disastrous days that followed, Maurice was subject to Frederick's displeasure. But the glorious Victory of Leuthen on 5 December 1757, put an end to this. At the close of that day, Frederick rode down the lines and called out to General Prince Maurice, "I congratulate you, Herr Feldmarschall!" At Zorndorf he again distinguished himself, but at the surprise of Hochkirch he fell wounded into the hands of the Austrians. Maurice suffered blood poisoning from the wound and succumbed soon after his release from captivity.
