= Bernhard I of Anhalt-Bernburg =

German prince

Bernhard I, Prince of Anhalt-Bernburg (c. 1218–1287) was a German prince of the House of Ascania and ruler of the principality of Anhalt-Bernburg.

He was the second son of Henry I, Count of Anhalt (who was elevated to the rank of prince in 1218), by his wife Irmgard, daughter of Hermann I, Landgrave of Thuringia.

== Life ==
After the death of Henry I in 1252, the surviving sons of the late prince divided his lands between them according to the laws of the House of Ascania. Bernhard received Bernburg.

== Marriage and issue ==
In Hamburg on 3 February 1258, Bernhard married Princess Sophie (b. 1240 – d. aft. 1284), daughter of King Abel of Denmark. They had six children:

1. John I, Prince of Anhalt-Bernburg (d. 5 June 1291)
2. Albert (d. 14 September 1324), Bishop of Halberstadt (1304–1324)
3. Bernhard II, Prince of Anhalt-Bernburg (b. ca. 1260 – d. aft. 26 December 1323)
4. Henry (d. aft. 14 March 1324), Prior of the Dominicans in Halberstadt
5. Rudolph (I) (d. 27 October 1286 / 11 July 1299?)
6. Sophie (d. aft. 20 May 1322), married bef. 28 February 1282 to Count Dietrich II of Honstein.

Bernhard I of Anhalt-Bernburg House of Ascania Born: ca. 1218 Died: 1287
Regnal titles
Preceded by Henry I	Prince of Anhalt-Bernburg; 1252–1287	Succeeded by John I and Bernhard II
