= Anhalt-Bernburg =

Principality of the Holy Roman Empire

Principality (Duchy) of Anhalt-Bernburg Fürstentum (Herzogtum) Anhalt-Bernburg (German)
- 1252–1468; 1603–1863
- 19th century flag of the Anhalt duchies 19th century coat of arms of the Anhalt duchies

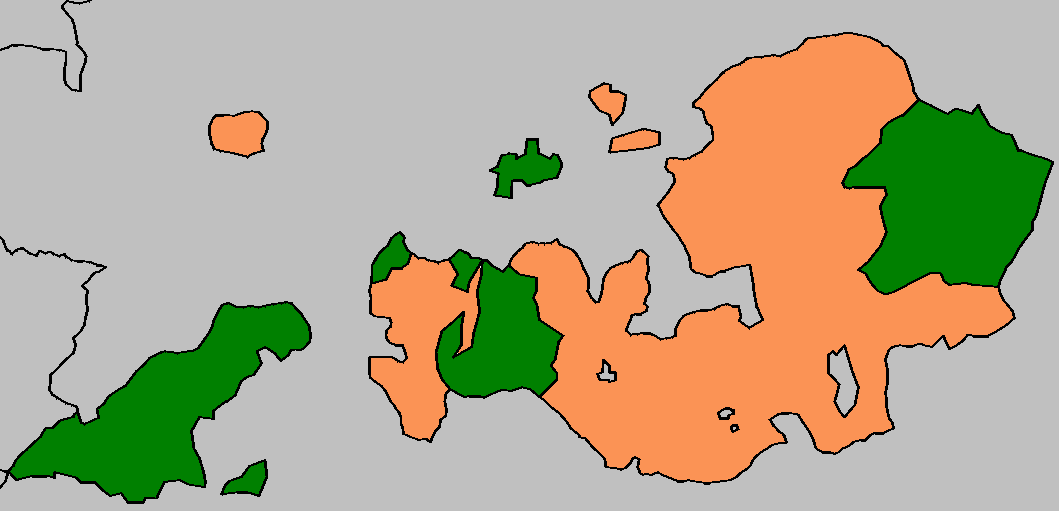
- The Anhalt territories in 1853, with Anhalt-Bernburg in green
- Status: State of the Holy Roman Empire (until 1806); State of the Confederation of the Rhine (1806–13); State of the German Confederation (from 1815)
- Capital: Bernburg
- Common languages: Upper Saxon
- Government: Principality
- Prince
  - 1252–1287: Bernhard I (first)
  - 1796–1803: Alexius Frederick Christian (last)
- Historical era: Middle Ages
  - Partitioned from Anhalt: 1252
  - Inherited by Anhalt-Dessau: 1468
  - Repartitioned from Anhalt: 1603
  - Anhalt-Zeitz-Hoym partitioned away: 1718–1812
  - Raised to duchy: 1803
  - Anhalt re-united: 1863
Preceded by	Succeeded by
Principality of Anhalt	Duchy of Anhalt
- Today part of: Saxony-Anhalt, Germany

Anhalt-Bernburg was a principality of the Holy Roman Empire and a duchy of the German Confederation ruled by the House of Ascania with its residence at Bernburg in present-day Saxony-Anhalt. It emerged as a subdivision from the Principality of Anhalt from 1252 until 1468, when it fell to the Ascanian principality of Anhalt-Dessau. Recreated in 1603, Anhalt-Bernburg finally merged into the re-unified Duchy of Anhalt upon the extinction of the line in 1863.

== History ==
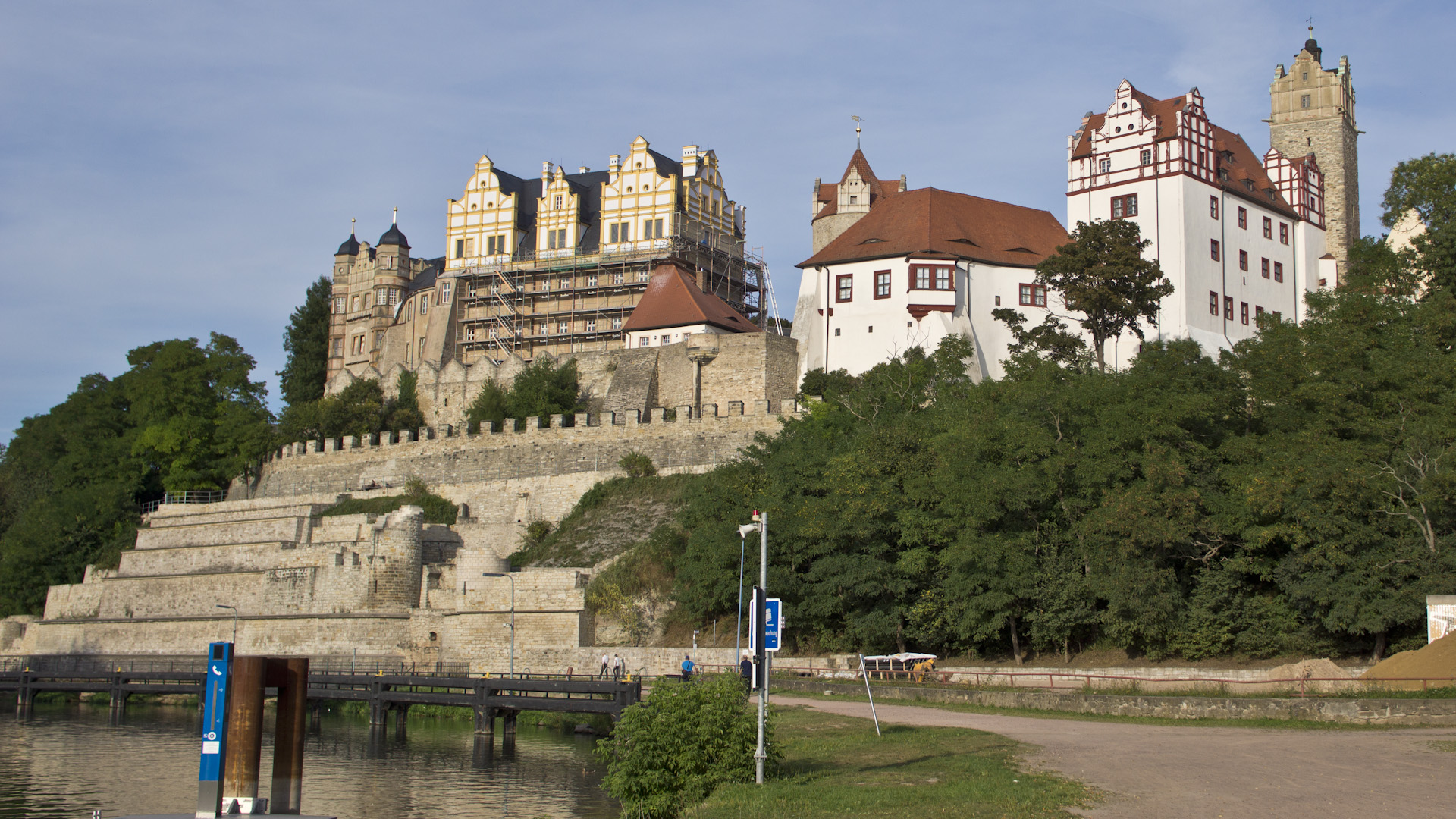
Bernburg Castle

It was created in 1252, when the Principality of Anhalt of the Holy Roman Empire was partitioned among the sons of Henry I into Anhalt-Aschersleben, Anhalt-Bernburg and Anhalt-Zerbst. Bernburg was allotted to Henry's second son Bernhard I. When the line of Anhalt-Aschersleben became extinct in 1315, Prince Bernhard II of Anhalt-Bernburg claimed their territory, he could however not prevail against his cousin Albert, Bishop of Halberstadt.

After the ruling family became extinct upon the death of Prince Bernhard VI in 1468, Anhalt-Bernburg was inherited by Prince George I of Anhalt-Dessau. With Anhalt-Dessau it was inherited by Prince Joachim Ernest of Anhalt-Zerbst in 1561, who unified all Anhalt lands under his rule in 1570.

Re-united Anhalt was again divided in 1603 among Prince Joachim Ernest's sons into the lines of Anhalt-Dessau, Anhalt-Köthen, Anhalt-Plötzkau, Anhalt-Bernburg and Anhalt-Zerbst. His second son Prince Christian I took his residence at Bernburg. Christian's younger son Frederick established the separate Principality of Anhalt-Harzgerode in 1635, which existed until 1709. Prince Victor Amadeus of Anhalt-Bernburg inherited Anhalt-Plötzkau in 1665. Upon his death in 1718 his lands were further divided and the Principality of Anhalt-Zeitz-Hoym was created for his second son Lebrecht, which was reunited with Anhalt-Bernburg in 1812.

In 1803 Prince Alexius Frederick Christian of Anhalt-Bernburg was elevated to the rank of a duke by Emperor Francis II of Habsburg. His son Duke Alexander Karl however died without issue in 1863, whereafter Anhalt-Bernburg was inherited by Leopold IV, Duke of Anhalt-Dessau, re-uniting all Anhalt lands under his rule.

In 1806, the Act of the Confederation of the Rhine elevated it to a duchy and in 1812 the two parts of the territory were united. Since 1815, the duchy was a member of the German Confederation. In 1847, Anhalt-Köthen-Plötzkau fell to Anhalt-Bernburg.

== Princes of Anhalt-Bernburg, 1252–1468 ==
- 1252–1287 Bernhard I
- 1287–1291 John I, son, co-regent with his brother
  - 1287–1323 Bernhard II
- 1323–1348 Bernhard III, son of Bernhard II
- 1348–1354 Bernhard IV, son
- 1354–1374 Henry IV, brother
- 1374–1404 Otto III, brother
- 1404–1420 Bernhard V, son of Henry IV, co-regent with his cousin
  - 1404–1415 Otto IV, son of Otto III
- 1420–1468 Bernhard VI, brother of Otto IV, left no male heirs

To Anhalt-Dessau

== Princes of Anhalt-Bernburg, 1603–1803 ==
- 1603–1630 Christian I, second son of Prince Joachim Ernest of Anhalt
- 1630–1656 Christian II, son
- 1656–1718 Victor Amadeus, son
- 1718–1721 Karl Frederick, son
- 1721–1765 Victor Frederick, son
- 1765–1796 Frederick Albert, son
- 1796–1803 Alexius Frederick Christian, son

Raised to duchy

== Dukes of Anhalt-Bernburg, 1803–1863 ==
- 1803–1834 Alexius Frederick Christian
- 1834–1863 Alexander Karl, son, died without issue

To re-united Anhalt
