= Erbprinzliches Palais Dessau =

Coordinates: 51.83367°N 12.242013°E

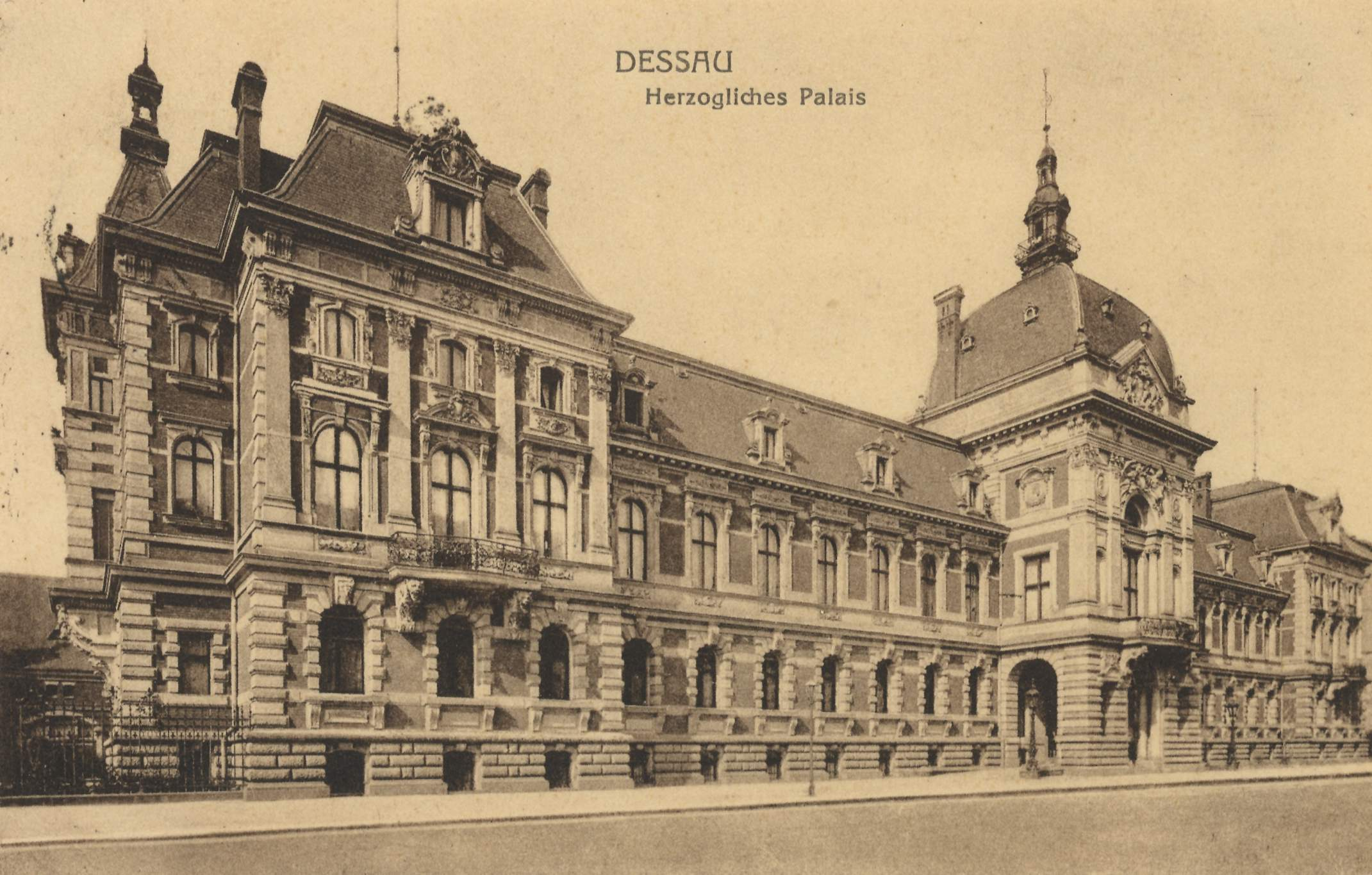
The Erbprinzliches Palais (Palace of the hereditary prince) in Dessau

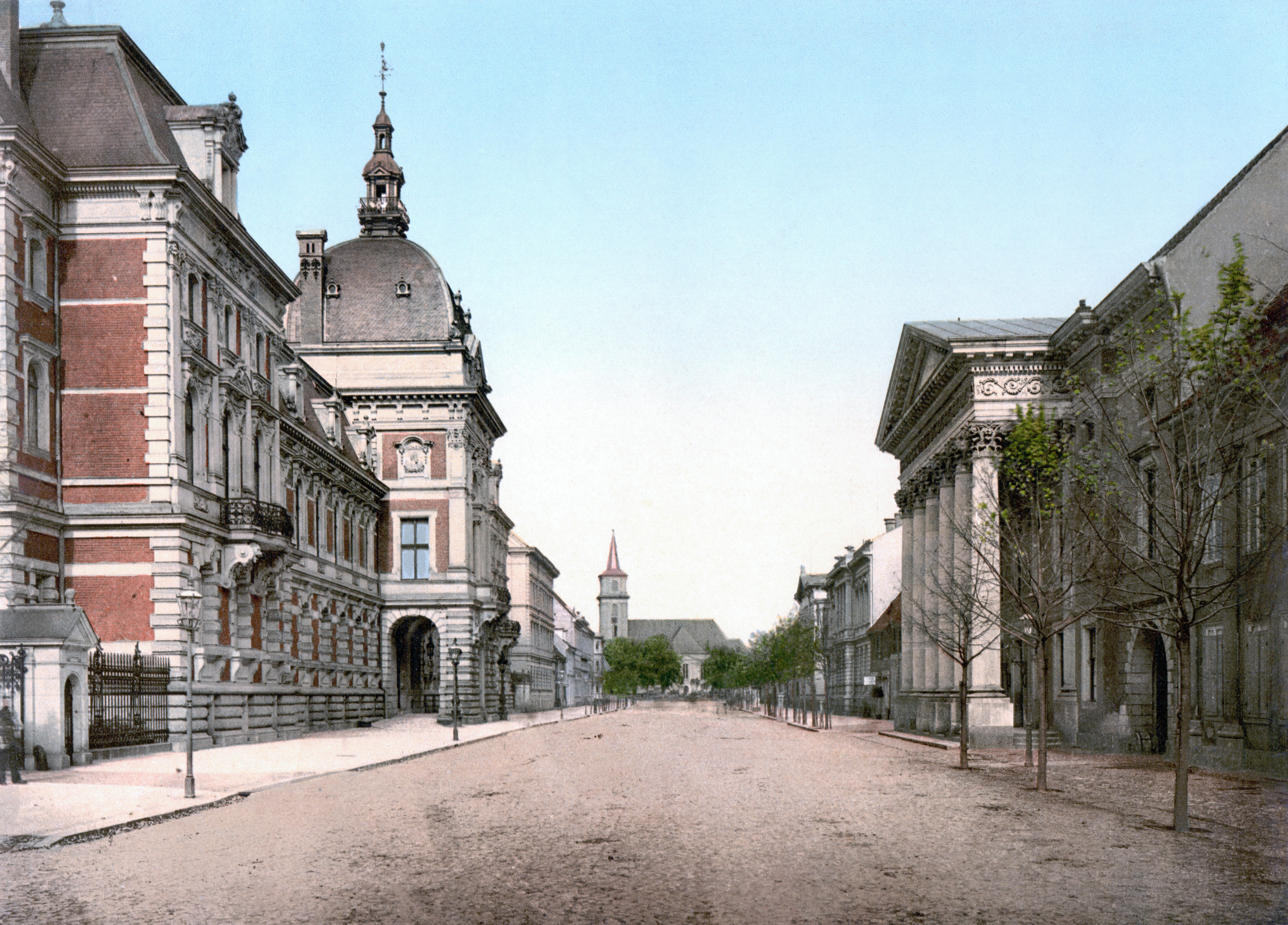
The Kavalierstrasse with the Erbprinzliches Palais on the left

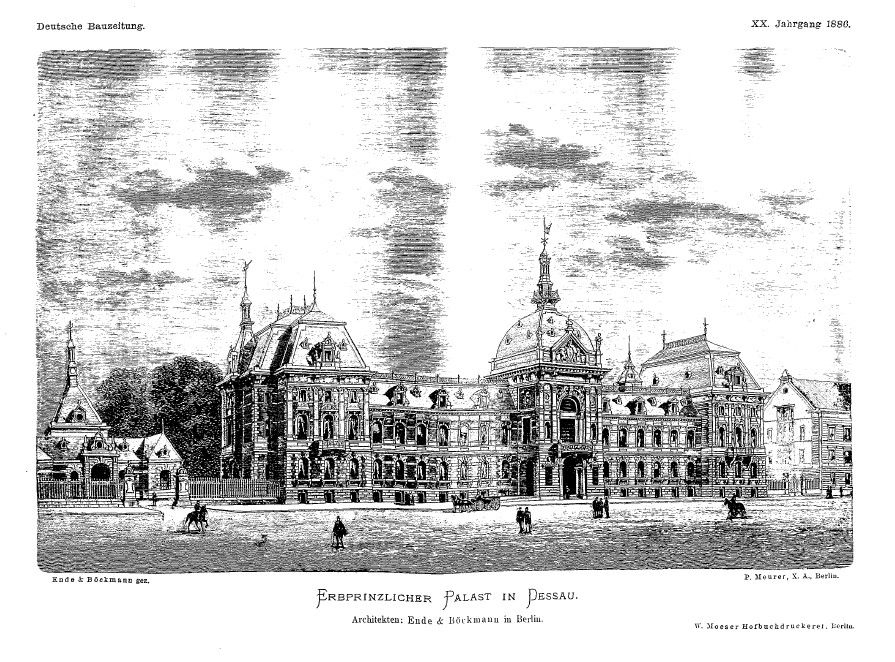
View of the palace as designed by the architects

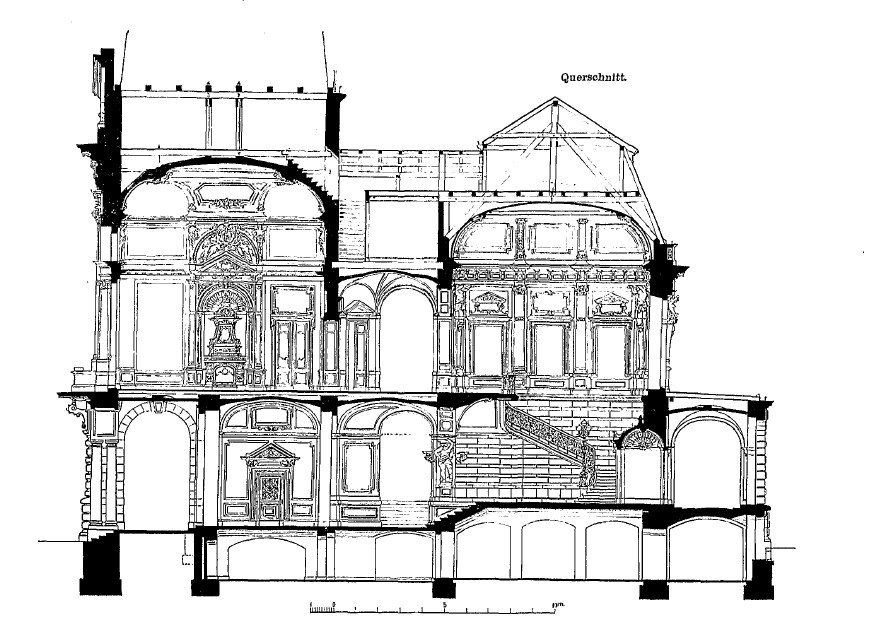
Intersection of the palace

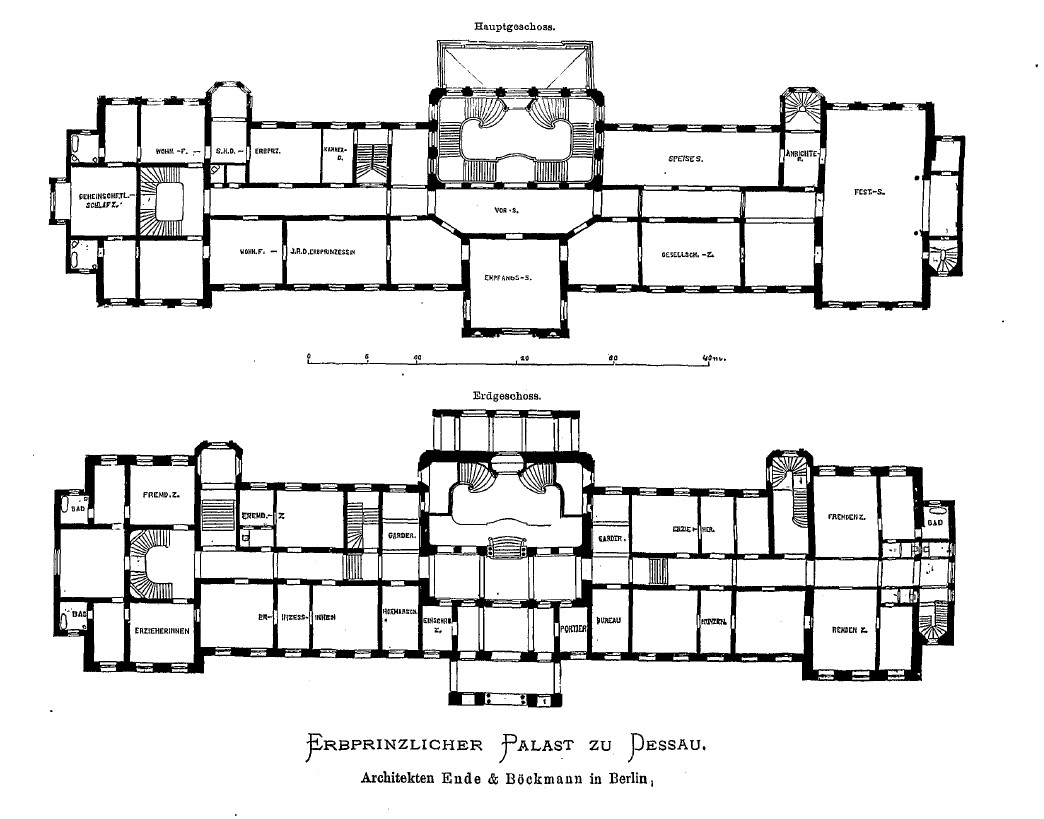
Plan of the palace

The Erbprinzliches Palais ('Palace of the hereditary prince') was a palace in Dessau, Saxony-Anhalt. It was on the Kavalierstrasse. The palace was also known as the Erbprinzenpalais or the Herzogliches Palais (ducal palace). Originally built for prince Frederick Henry Eugen of Anhalt-Dessau, it was later the residence of the Hereditary Prince and the Dukes of Anhalt. Today, the Dessau City Park is located on the grounds of the palace and its garden.

== History ==
Leopold I, Prince of Anhalt-Dessau had two palaces built in the Kavalierstraße for both his sons Eugen and Moritz um 1740 around 1740. The northern one, which Eugen lived in until his death in 1781, consisted of a two-storey corps de logis with 17 bay windows. Two gateways connected it with two side pavilions, also two storeys high. All three structures were covered by mansard roofs. The facade was articulated by Tuscan colossal pilasters, the three central axes crowned by a triangular pediment. Prince Friedrich Heinrich Eugen von Anhalt-Dessau was most recently governor of the fortified town of Wittenberg in Electoral Saxony. When he was in Dessau, he lived in his palace on Kavalierstrasse. In 1780 the prince had a house built in his garden, in which he also wanted to be buried.

The palace fell to Eugen's sister Henriette Amalie of Anhalt-Dessau in 1781 by inheritance, who gave it to her nephew, Leopold III. of Anhalt-Dessau in exchange for another palace. Prince Leopold III had Prince Eugene's garden house replaced by a burial chamber crowned by a squat obelisk (the "pyramid") on the north wall of the palace garden. This is where Eugen's coffin stood until it was transferred to the crypt of St. Mary's Church in 1926. The pyramid was redesigned as a memorial to soldiers of the 188th Infantry Regiment who died in World War I, survived World War II, and was demolished in 1952.

The palace was handed over to the hereditary prince Frederick of Anhalt-Dessau in 1792 and was used as a hereditary prince's palace for the first time in its history. Frederick died in 1814, but his wife princess Amalie of Hesse-Homburg continued to use it until her death in 1846. During this time, the garden behind the palace building consisted of a regular hippodrome-like layout with the "pyramid" at the northern apex gradually expanded beyond the city wall. The landscaped grounds soon extended to the Kleine Kienheide to today's acacia grove and Tivoliberg, which was then called "Amalienberg" and had a small pavilion. Around 1800, a small orangery was built in the palace garden, which has been preserved. The well-proportioned building is completed by a high hipped roof and has a gabled central risalit on the south side, which opens into an exedra, which today is impaired by a modern porch. The building has been used for gastronomy since the 1950s (“tea house”) and a side wing was added for this purpose in 1966.

When the later duke Frederick I. of Anhalt moved into the palace on Kavalierstraße after his marriage in 1854, the house once again became the seat of an hereditary prince. In 1874, Friedrich moved to the Dessauer Residenzschloss, the Hereditary Prince's Palace was to be extensively renovated. However, the building fabric was already in such poor condition and the beams were infested with fungus and wormy that the decision was made to build a new building. The demolition began on August 27, 1883, and the earthworks for the new building were carried out in the winter.

Between 1884 and 1888 a new palace was constructed in the French Renaissance style based on a design by Hermann Ende and Wilhelm Böckmann from Berlin. Professor Lessing was commissioned with the interior design and was responsible for the festival and representation rooms. The workshop of the wood sculptor Gustav Kuntzsch, Wernigerode, supplied furniture and carvings for the interior. A stable was built at the same time as the palace. Dukes Frederick I. and Frederick II. lived in the palace one after the other. The house now became the ducal palace.

After the first World War, the palace remained initially with the ducal family, but was transferred to the state in 1926. The Dessau municipal council then made the decision to demolish the palace in 1927. The city park was created from the free area and the palace gardens behind it. The original intention was to build the new theater on the land to replace the Friedrich Theater building, which burned down in 1922. As a result of the global economic crisis in 1929, the theater project was postponed and the new Theater was built at a different location (Friedensplatz) between 1935 and 1938.

== Bibliography ==
- Anhaltische Schlösser in Geschichte und Kunst. Dessau: Falken. 1991. p. 208. ISBN 3-806846383.
- Helmut Erfurth (2002). Zwischen Biedermeier und Bauhaus: Ein Rundgang durch das historische Dessau. Dessau: Anhalt-Edition. p. 128. ISBN 978-3936383027.
- Daten und Hintergründe zum Dessauer Stadtpark. Dessau: Reisewerk. February 2007.
- "Erbprinzlicher Palast in Dessau. Architekten Ende & Böckmann in Berlin". Deutsche Bauzeitung. 75. Berlin: 445. 1886.
