= Henriette Johanne Marie Müller =

German lemon seller (1841–1916)

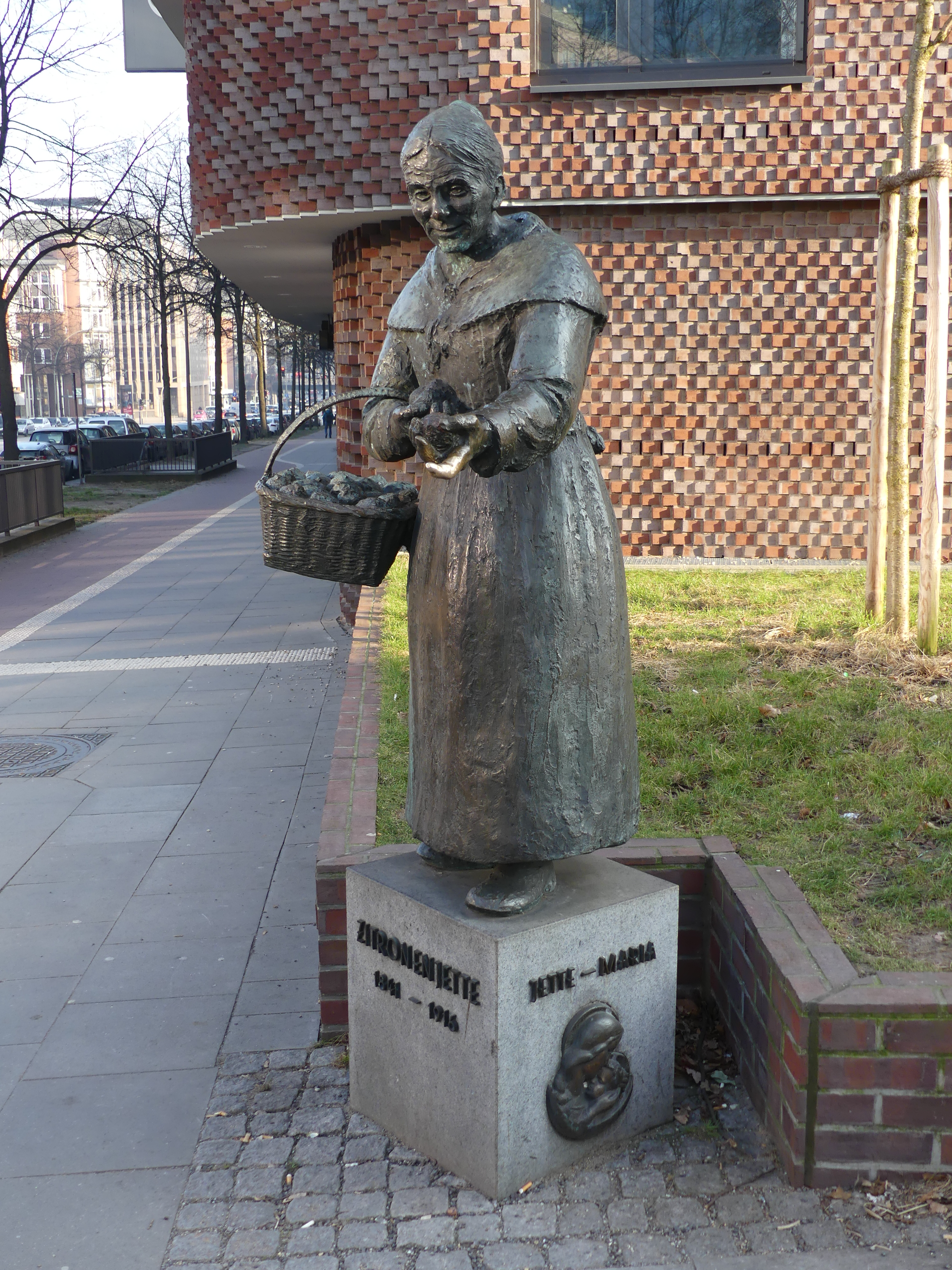

Henriette Johanne Marie Müller, called the Zitronenjette, (18 July 1841 – 8 July 1916) was a popular figure now identified with the city of Hamburg.

== Life ==
Born in Dessau, Müller made a living in the last two decades of the nineteenth century by selling lemons (in German Zitronen) on the Grasbrook during the day and at nights in the pubs of the Neustadt. Her famous call while she sold the lemons was Zitroon! Zitroon!. Due to drunkenness and mental illness, in August 1894 she was sent to the Friedrichsberg asylum.

== Memory ==
A memorial to her is located on Ludwig-Erhardt-Straße near St. Michaelis' Church. It states in Low German:

„Dien Leben wer suur/As de Zitronen, sall/sick dat Erinnern an/di lohnen? Dien Schik-/sol wiest op all de/Lüüd, for de dat Glück/het gor keen Tiet.“

"Your life was as sour as lemons; shall remembrance on you would it be worth? Your destiny is pointing to all the people for whom happiness has no time."

== Theater ==
Already in 1900, a play named after her was performed in the Ernst-Drucker-Theater, and other works were to follow. In the 1920s Paul Möhring wrote a play with music entitled Zitronenjette; the role of Müller was originally written for the actor Ernst Budzinski. In the play, which humoristically depicts Müller and her contemporaries, the lemon seller was frequently played by a man. For example, the role of Zitronenjette was Henry Vahl's last major performance at the St. Pauli Theater and one of his last major roles.
