= Peter Schmidt =

Peter or Pete Schmidt may refer to:

- Peter Schmidt (Trondheim politician) (1782–1845), Norwegian merchant and politician
- Peter Schmidt (zoologist) (1872–1949), Russian zoologist and ichthyologist
- Pete Schmidt (baseball) (1890–1973), Major League Baseball pitcher
- Peter Schmidt (artist) (1931–1980), British artist and teacher
- Peter Lebrecht Schmidt (1933–2019), German classical scholar
- Peter Schmidt (water polo) (born 1937), German Olympic water polo player
- Peter Schmidt (footballer) (born 1943), Austrian footballer
- Peter Schmidt (author) (born 1944), German author, recipient of the Deutscher Krimi Preis
- Peter Schmidt (economist) (born 1947), American economist and econometrician
- Pete Schmidt (American football) (1948–2000), American football coach
- Peter Schmidt (political scientist), see Werner Bergmann
- Peter Schmidt (Wisconsin politician) (born 1992), American politician
- Peter B. Schmidt, Democratic member of the New Hampshire House of Representatives

== See also ==
- Pyotr Schmidt (1867–1906), Russian revolutionary, circa 1905
