= Dessau =

Former city in Saxony-Anhalt, Germany

- Stadtteil of Dessau-Roßlau
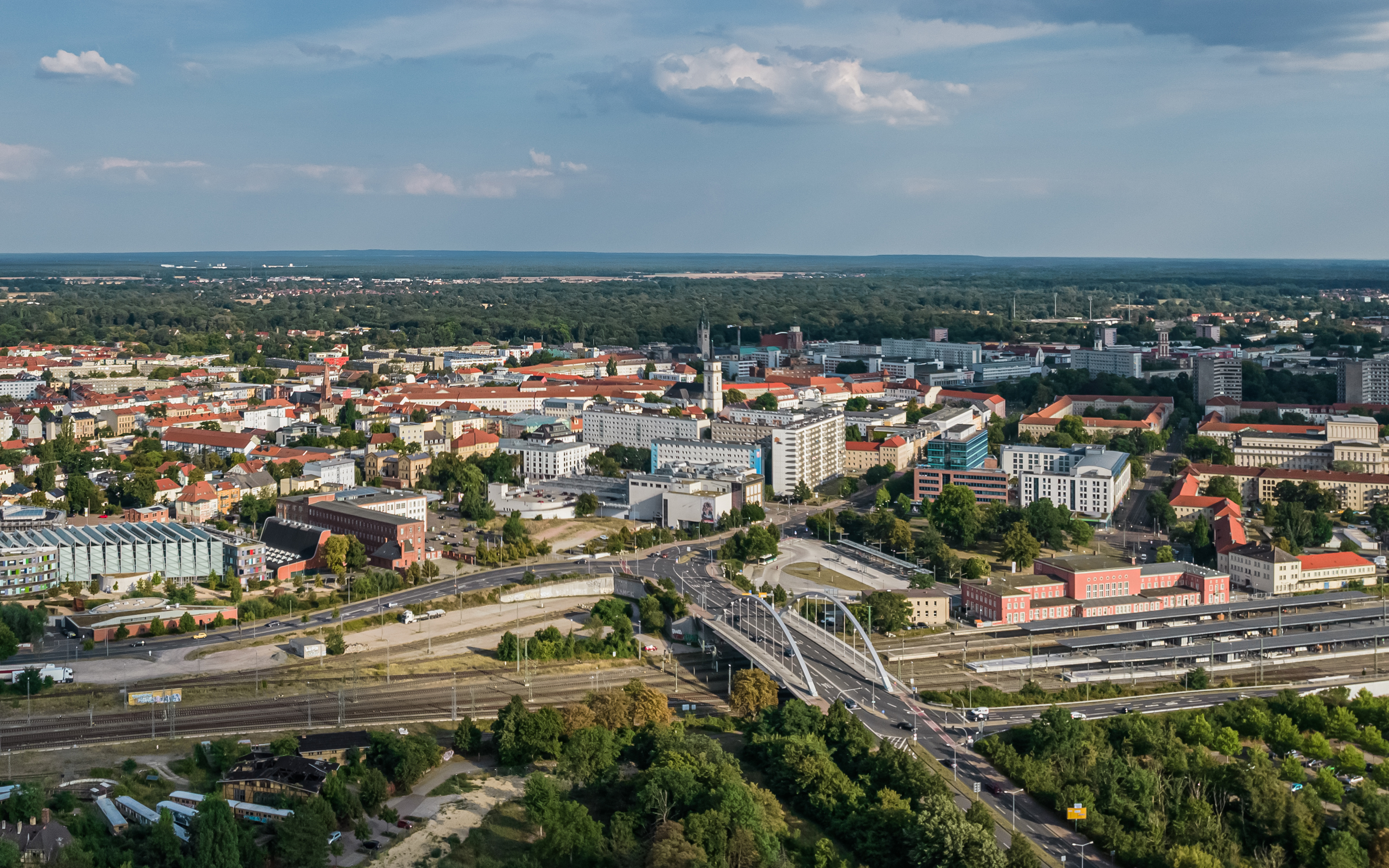
- Aerial view 2022

- Coat of arms
- Interactive map of Dessau
- Location within Germany Location within Saxony-Anhalt
- Coordinates: 51°50′N 12°15′E
- Country: Germany
- State: Saxony-Anhalt
- District: Urban district
- Town: Dessau-Roßlau

Area
  - Total: 182.81 km^{2} (70.58 sq mi)
- Elevation: 61 m (200 ft)

Population (2020-12-31)
  - Total: 67,747
  - Density: 370.59/km^{2} (959.82/sq mi)
- Time zone: UTC+01:00 (CET)
  - Summer (DST): UTC+02:00 (CEST)
- Postal codes: 06811-06849
- Dialling codes: 0340
- Vehicle registration: DE
- Website: www.dessau.de

Dessau (German pronunciation: [ˈdɛsaʊ]) is a district of the independent city of Dessau-Roßlau in Saxony-Anhalt at the confluence of the rivers Mulde and Elbe, in the Bundesland (Federal State) of Saxony-Anhalt. Until 1 July 2007, it was an independent city. The population of Dessau is 67,747 (Dec. 2020).

== Geography ==
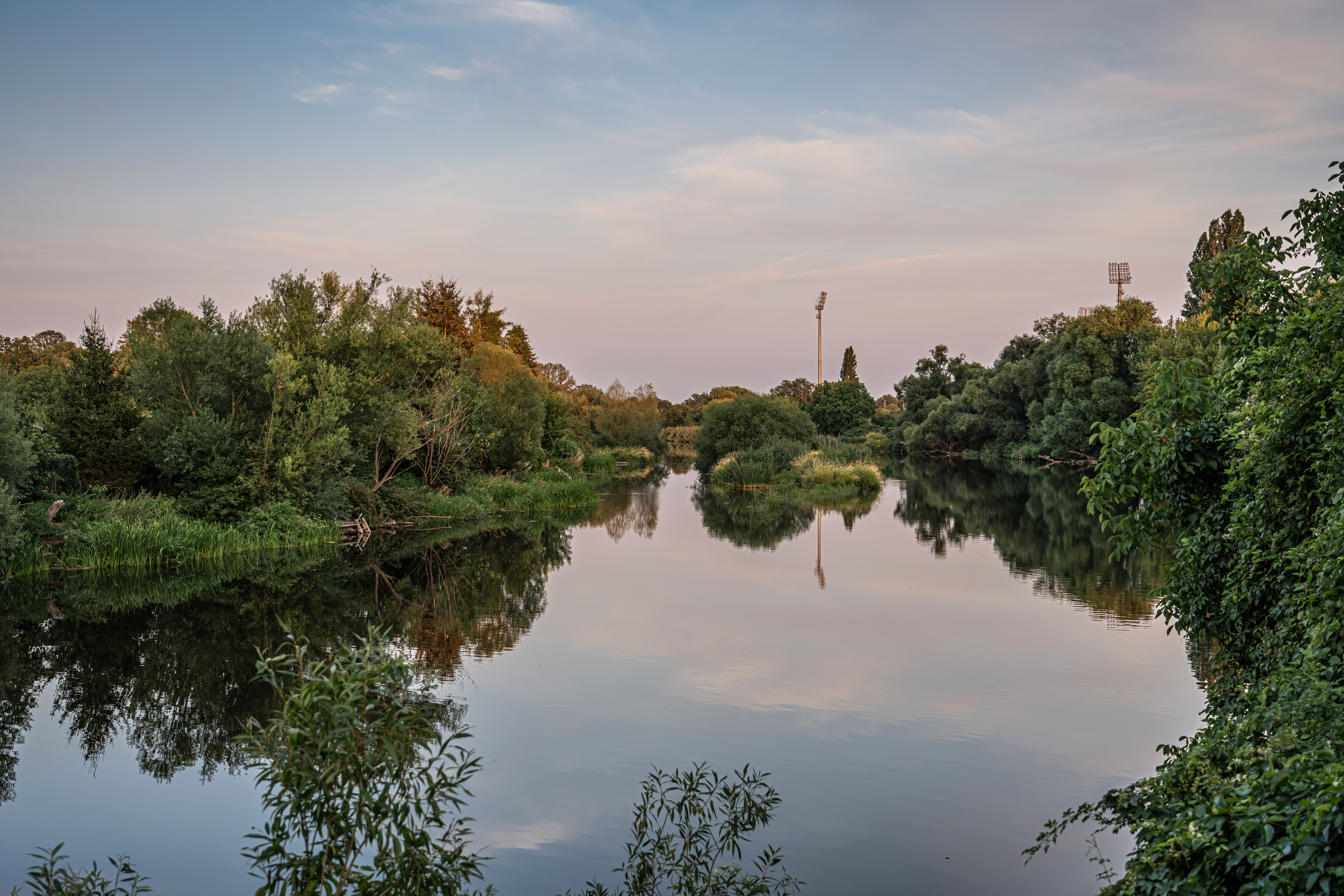
The river Mulde in Dessau

Dessau is situated on a floodplain where the Mulde flows into the Elbe. This causes yearly floods. The worst flood took place in the year 2002, when the Waldersee district was nearly completely flooded. The south of Dessau touches a well-wooded area called Mosigkauer Heide. The highest elevation is a 110 m high former rubbish dump called Scherbelberg in the southwest of Dessau. Dessau is surrounded by numerous parks and palaces that make it one of the greenest towns in Germany.

== History ==
Dessau Historical Population

Dessau was first mentioned in 1213. It became an important centre in 1570, when the Principality of Anhalt was founded. Dessau became the capital of this state within the Holy Roman Empire. In 1603, the state was split into four – later five – Anhalts, Dessau becoming the capital of the mini-state of Anhalt-Dessau. In 1863 two of the noble lines died out, and the Duchy of Anhalt became reunited. From 1918 to 1945, Dessau was the capital of the Free State of Anhalt.

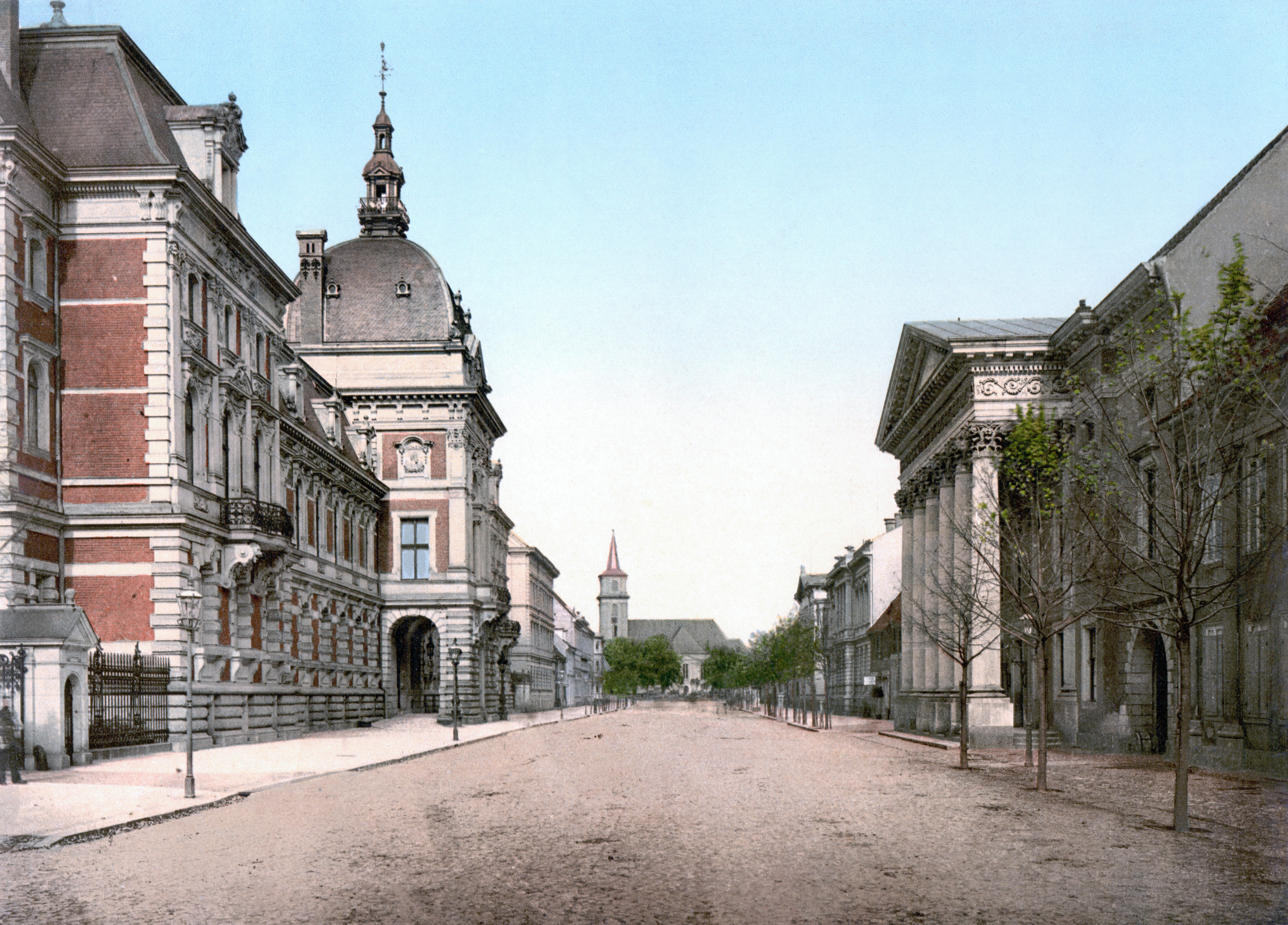
Cavalierstrasse in 1900 with the Erbprinzliches Palais Dessau

Dessau is famous as the second site of the Bauhaus school. It moved here in 1925 after it had been forced to close in Weimar. Many famous artists were lecturers in Dessau in the following years, among them Walter Gropius, Paul Klee and Wassily Kandinsky. The Nazis’ control of Dessau city council forced the closure of the Dessau Bauhaus in 1932. The school moved to Bernau bei Berlin and closed its doors for the last time in 1933.

The town was almost completely destroyed by Allied air raids in World War II on 7 March 1945, six weeks before American troops occupied the town. Afterwards, it was rebuilt with typical GDR concrete slab architecture (Plattenbau) and became a major industrial centre of East Germany. Since German reunification in 1990, many historic buildings have been restored.

The composer Kurt Weill was born in Dessau. Since 1993, the city has hosted an annual Kurt Weill Festival. Dessau was also the birthplace of the philosopher Moses Mendelssohn (in 1729), and Leopold I, Prince of Anhalt-Dessau (der alte Dessauer) (on 3 July 1676), a lauded field marshal for the Kingdom of Prussia.

In January 2005, Dessau gained notoriety for the mysterious death of a Sierra Leonean asylum seeker, Oury Jalloh. Jalloh died in police custody, however, the official version of events released by the police was found to have many inconsistencies.

== Sights ==
=== Castles and gardens ===
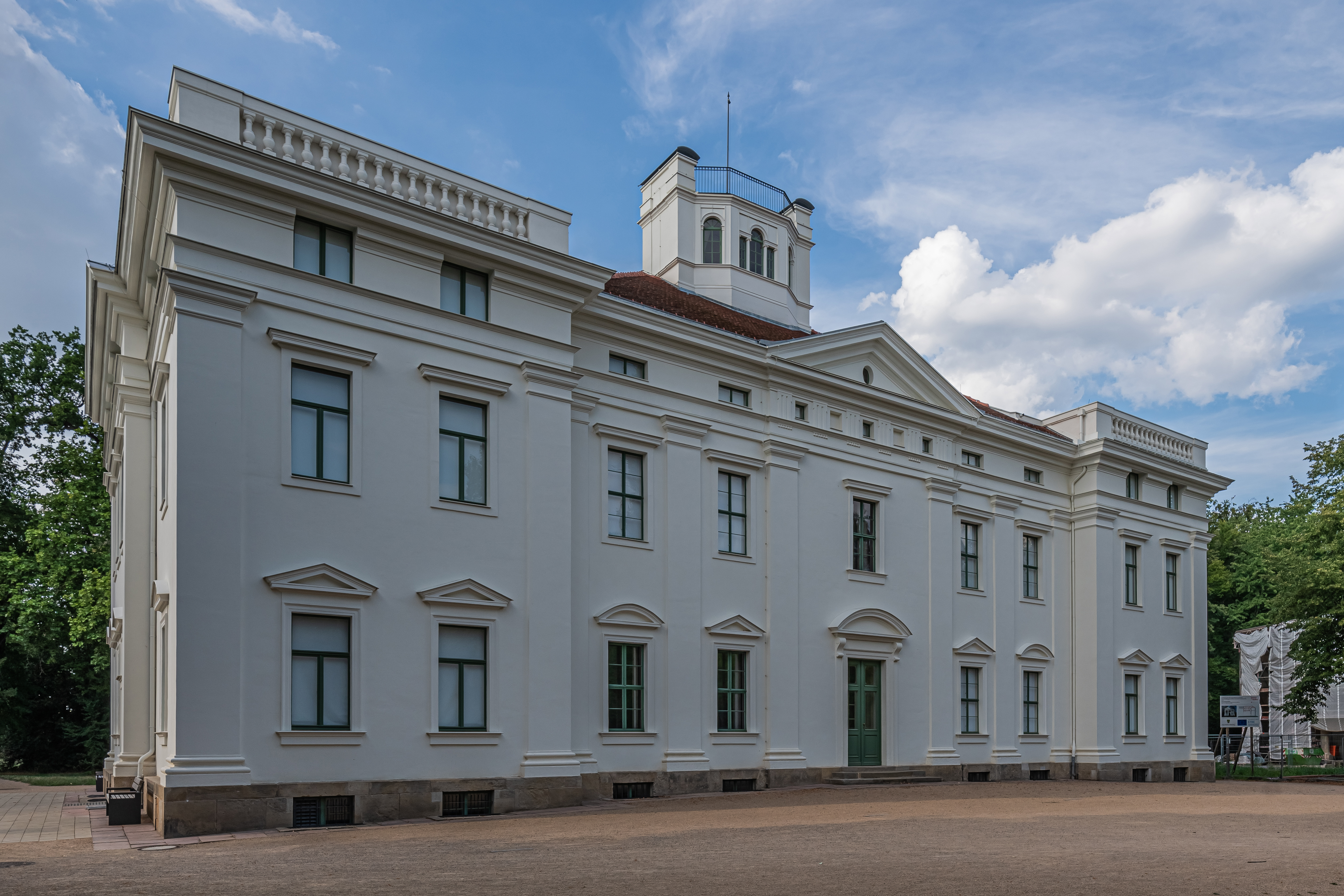
Georgium Castle

- Garden Kingdom of Dessau-Wörlitz, (Dessau-Wörlitzer Gartenreich) is a World Heritage Site landscape garden. It is an exceptional example of 18th century Age of Enlightenment landscape design in the English style.
- Dresden Elbe Valley
- Zoo at Mausoleumspark
- Wallwitzburg
- Rondell
- remains of the Dessau Palace (Johannbau)
- Georgium Palace and Park
- Kühnau Palace and Park
- Mosigkau Palace and Park
- Luisium Palace and Park
- Erbprinzliches Palais Dessau (demolished)

=== The Bauhaus ===
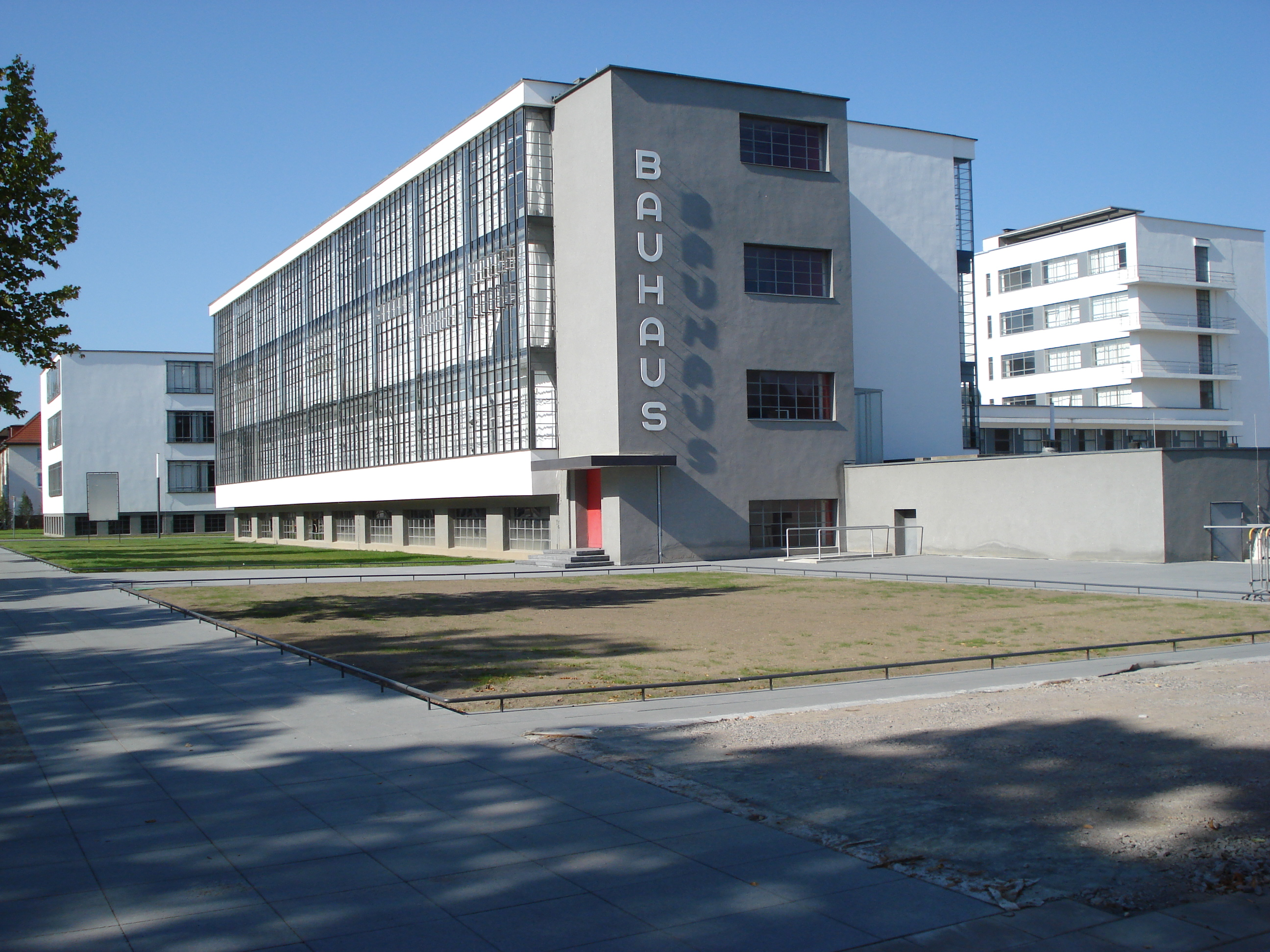
Bauhaus Dessau building, built 1925-26

There are several examples of Bauhaus architecture in Dessau, some of which are part of the Bauhaus and its Sites in Weimar, Dessau and Bernau World Heritage Site. This includes the Bauhaus Dessau school building, designed by Walter Gropius, which is one of the iconic modernist buildings of the 20th century.

In addition to the buildings that are part of the World Heritage Site, other notable Bauhaus architecture in Dessau includes:

- Dessau-Törten Estate, designed by Walter Gropius in 1926–1928.
- Stahlhaus (Steel House), designed by Georg Muche and Richard Paulick in 1926–1927.
- Fieger Haus, designed by Carl Fieger in 1927.
- The Kornhaus, a restaurant overlooking the river Elbe designed by Carl Fieger in 1929–1930.
- Arbeitsamt (Employment office), designed by Walter Gropius in 1928–1929. It is now the Dessau-Roßlau Amt für Ordnung und Verkehr (Authority of Public Security and Regulations).

=== Churches ===
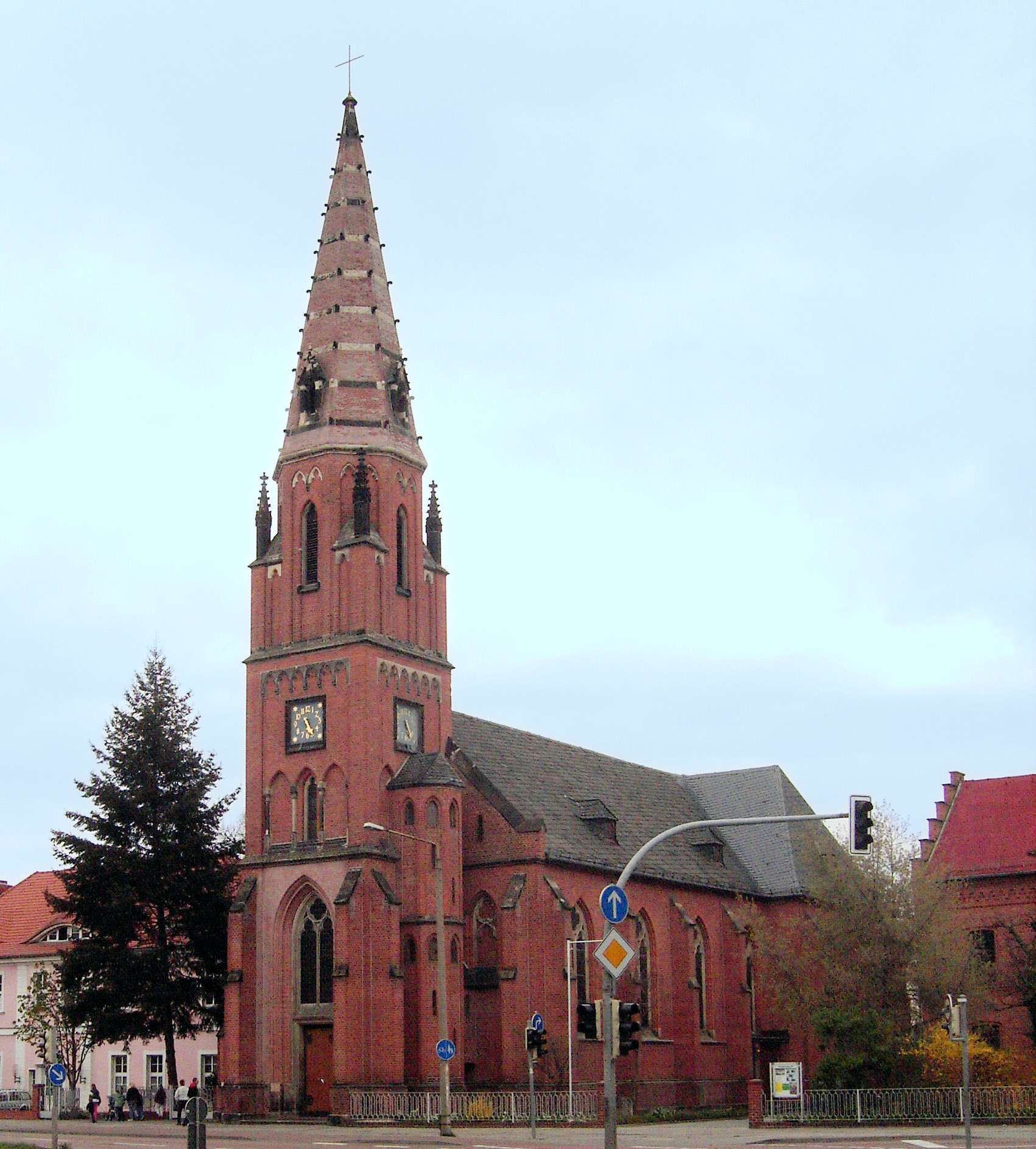
Church of St. Peter and Paul

- St. Mary's Church
- St. John's Church
- Georgenkirche
- Petruskirche
- Auferstehungskirche
- Pauluskirche
- Christuskirche
- Propsteikirche St. Peter and Paul
- Dreieinigkeit
- St. Josef

=== Other sights ===
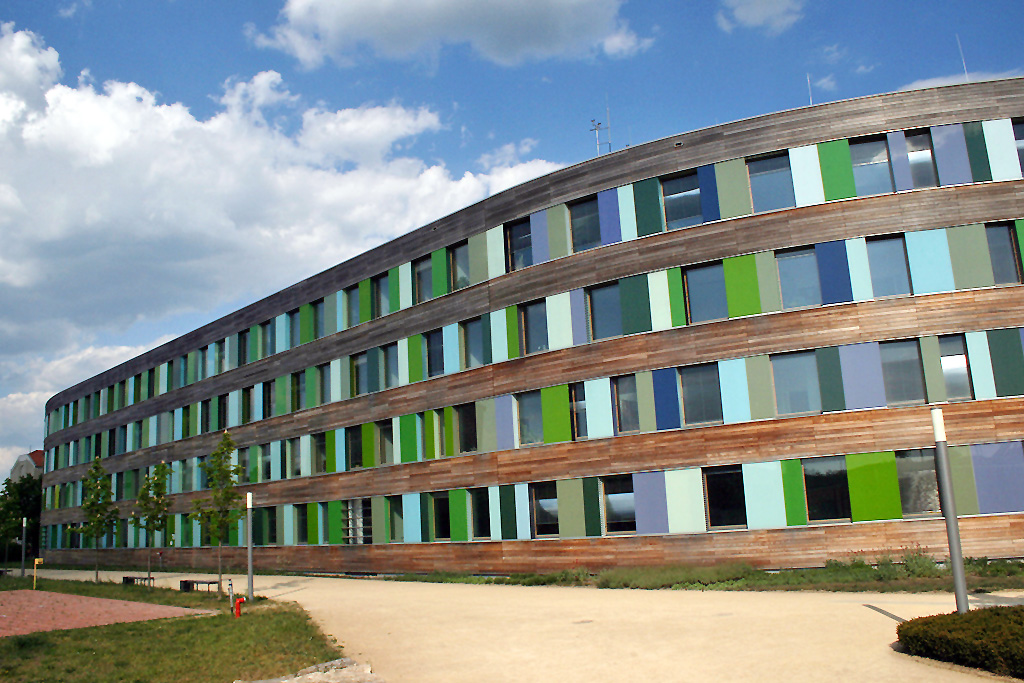
Umweltbundesamt (UBA)

- Townhall, built in 1901
- The palaces of Waldersee and Dietrich, today used as libraries
- General post office
- New water tower
- Umweltbundesamt (formerly Wörlitzer Bahnhof)
- Footbridge crossing the river Mulde

== Culture ==
=== Theatres and museums ===
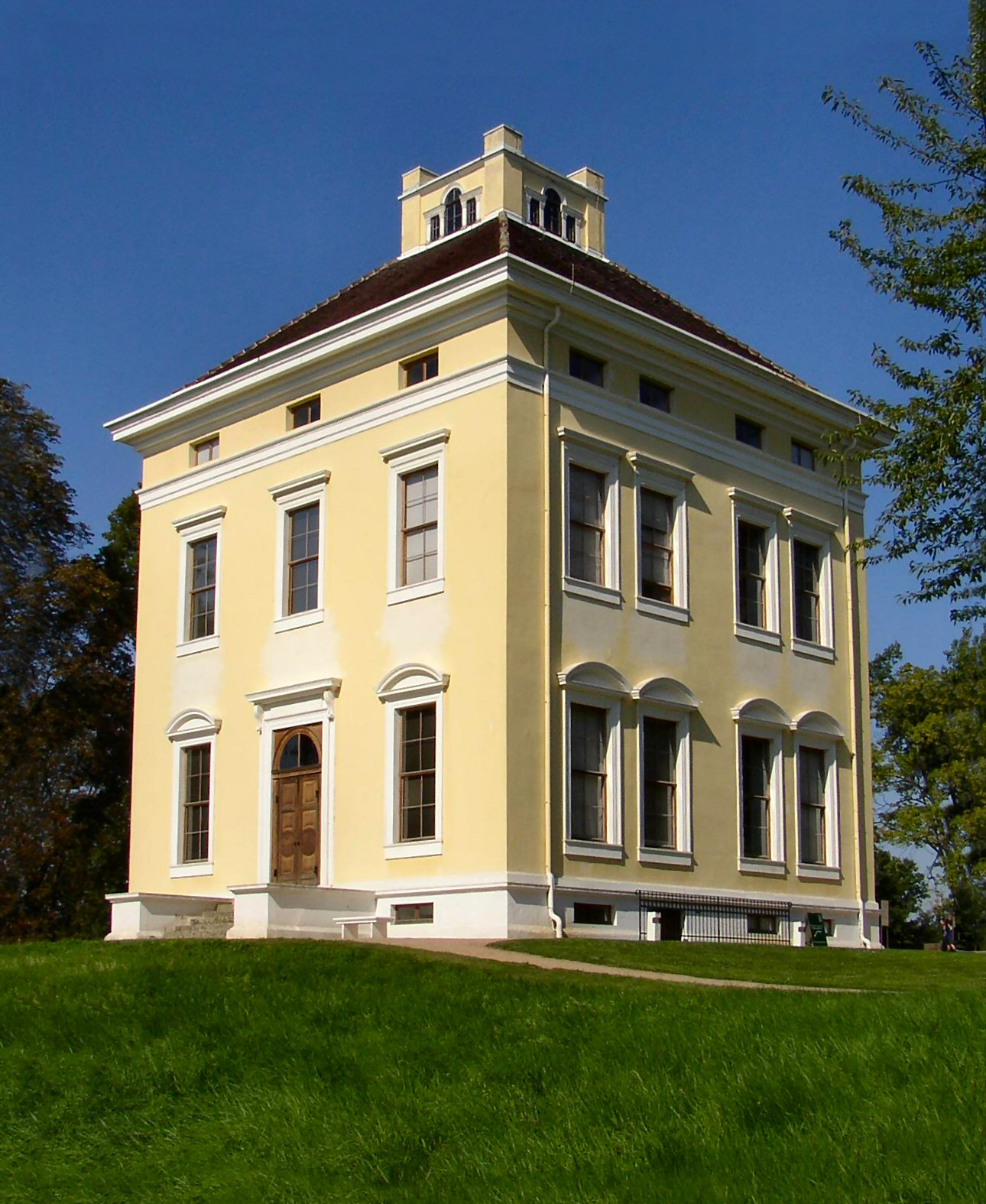
Luisium

- Anhaltisches Theater including Gregor Seyffert & Compagnie
- City history museum
- Anhalt Art Gallery at Georgium Palace with park (currently closed)
- Mosigkau Palace museum
- Luisium Castle museum with park
- Oranienbaum Palace museum with park
- Museum of Natural- and Prehistory
- Moses Mendelssohn-Centre
- Hugo Junkers Technical Museum
- UCI Cinema Complex
- Kiez-Cinema (one of the smallest Cinemas in Germany)

=== Regional media ===
- Mitteldeutsche Zeitung (daily newspaper, Monday-Saturday)
- Wochenspiegel (free newspaper on Wednesday) and Supersonntag (free newspaper on Sunday)
- REGJO (quarterly Economy Journal for the Region of Leipzig/Halle)
- leo (monthly, regional Event- and Culture Magazine)
- local Studios of the MDR and SAW (Radiostations)
- local TV Stations: RAN 1 and Offener Kanal Dessau

== Transport ==
=== Public transport ===
The Dessau tramway network has three lines and is supplemented by numerous bus lines. Dessau's public transport is operated by Dessauer Verkehrsgesellschaft (DVG), which transports around 6 million people each year.

=== Railway stations ===
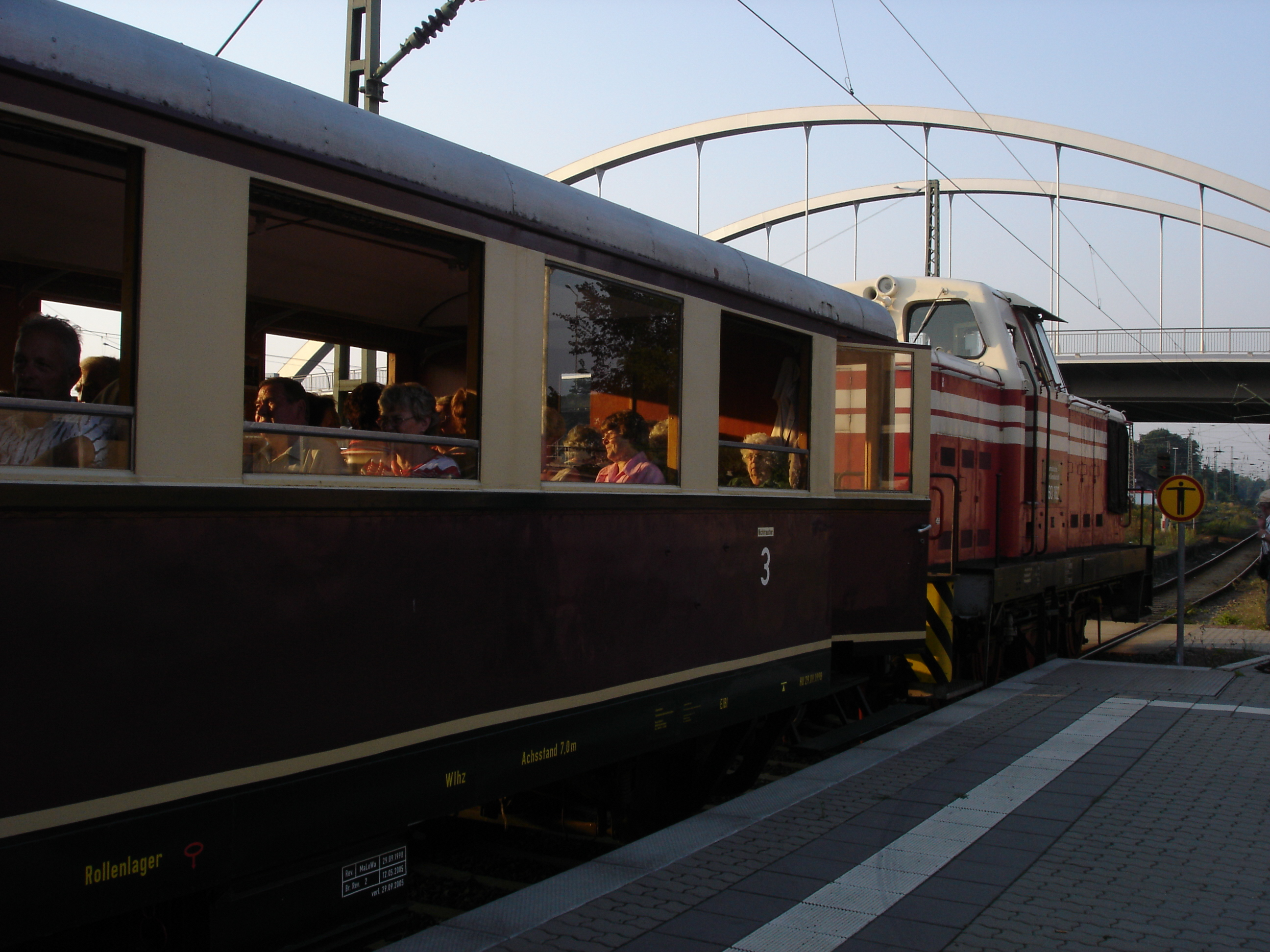
The Dessau-Wörlitzer-Eisenbahn (DWE)

Dessau Hauptbahnhof (main station) has connections to Magdeburg, Berlin, Leipzig, Halle, Bitterfeld and Lutherstadt Wittenberg. The line from Berlin was opened on 1 September 1840. The Dessau-Bitterfeld line (opened on 17 August 1857) was electrified in 1911, the first fully electrified long-distance railway in Germany. Dessau was part of the InterCity long-distance network until the year 2002. Regional trains also stop at the stations Dessau-Süd, Dessau-Alten, Dessau-Mosigkau and Rodleben. The Dessau-Wörlitzer-Eisenbahn (railway) connects Dessau to Wörlitz, a town situated 15 km to the east, and the Wörlitzer Park. The starting point of this railway is the main station. This train also stops at the stations Dessau-Waldersee and Dessau-Adria.

=== Roads ===
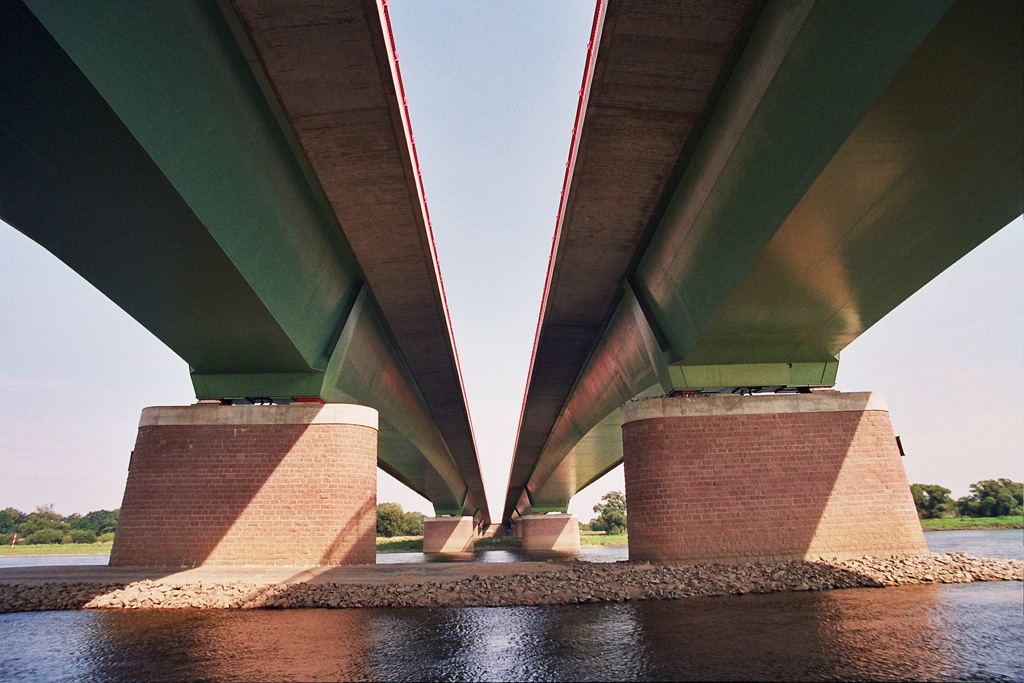
Bridge of the A9 near Dessau crossing the river Elbe

In 1938 the autobahn A9 (Munich-Berlin) was built southeast of the town area. The two exits to Dessau on the A9 are called Dessau-Ost and Dessau-Süd. Dessau is also crossed by the Bundesstrassen (federal roads) B 184 and B 185.

=== Airfield ===
The airfield of Dessau (ICAO: EDAD) is situated northwest of the town between the districts Kleinkühnau, Alten, and Siedlung. A destination with a charter airplane is possible. The runway has a length of 1000 m. The Hugo Junkers Technical Museum is situated in the neighbourhood directly east of the airfield, with the eastern end of the modern runway almost directly abutting the historical World War II Junkers factory airstrip's western end.

=== Water ===
Today the Leopoldshafen (harbour) is used for annual international motorboat racing events. The "Wallwitzhafen" is used as a private pleasure boat harbour and the Elbehafen near the Grain House is used for cruisers. The next harbour for goods is situated in Rosslau.

=== Bikes ===
Dessau is located in the flat landscape of the Saxon Lowland. The local bike paths have a length of about 146 km and connect all major parks and sights.

== Sports ==
Sports like soccer, cycling, handball, volleyball, gymnastics, table tennis and tennis have a long tradition and are very popular in Dessau. The former soccer team SG Waggonbau Dessau won the GDR soccer cup in 1949. The handball team played in the GDR Oberliga and since 1990 they are playing in the 1st and 2nd Bundesliga. Currently, Dessau has around 80 sport clubs with over 13,500 members. Next to the traditional sports, Dessau has active sport clubs in the following disciplines: aikido, badminton, basketball, canoeing, chess, climbing, cycling, dancing, fishing, horse riding, karate, judo, jiu-jitsu, motorboat, rowing, speedskating, sailing, skittles, skydiving, squash, swimming, table tennis, water polo, wrestling and others.

=== Facilities ===
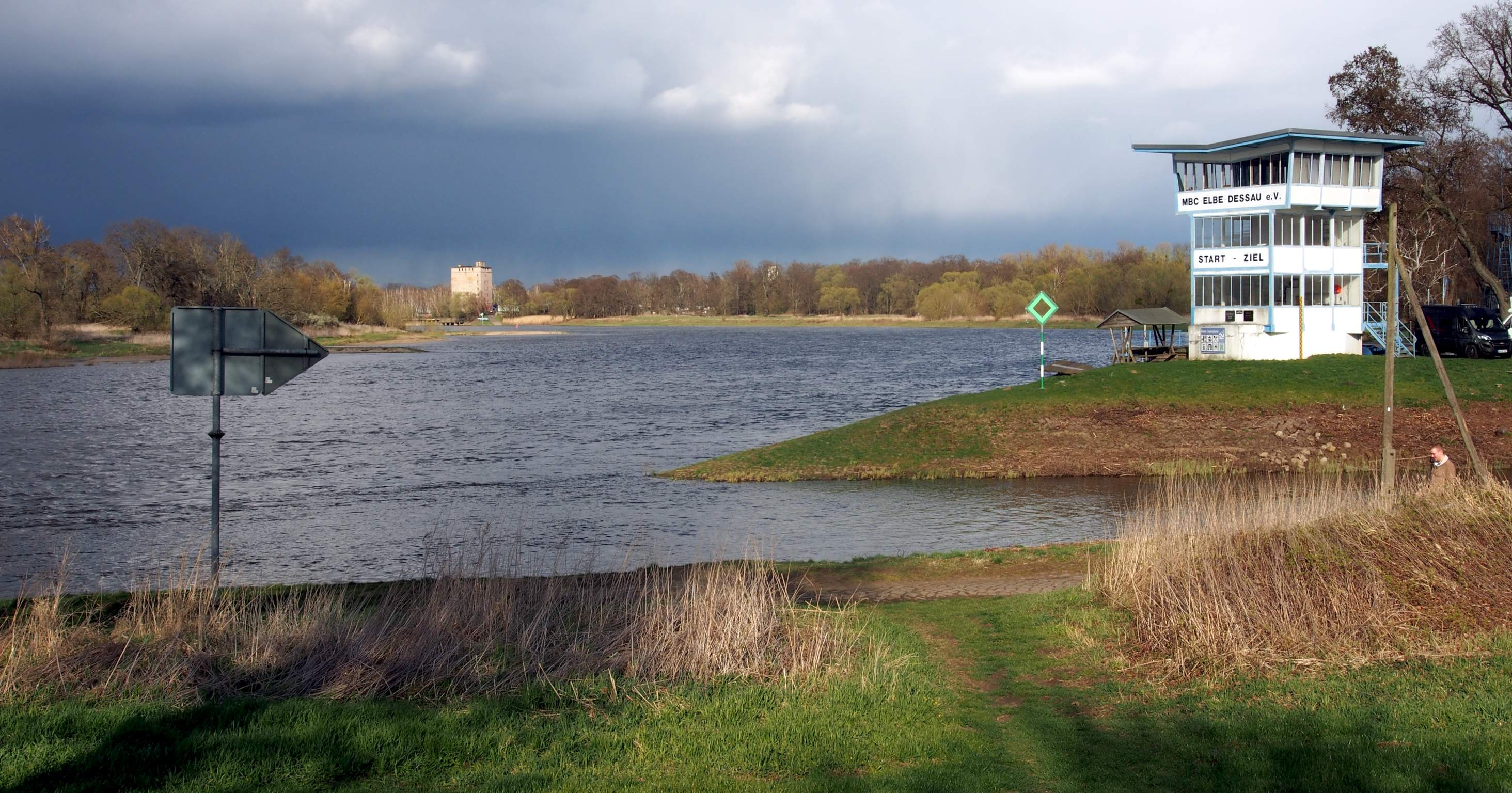
Motorboat racing tower at Kornhaus

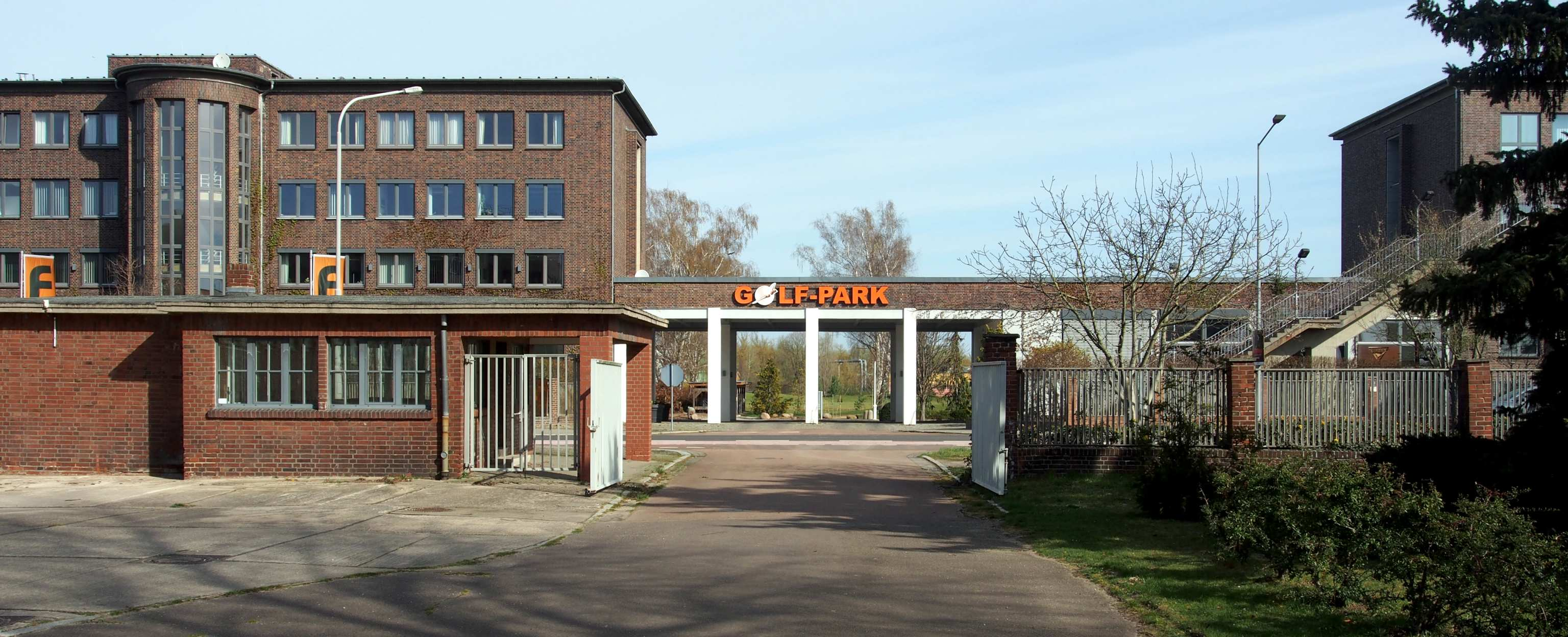
Golf course on the former Junkers area

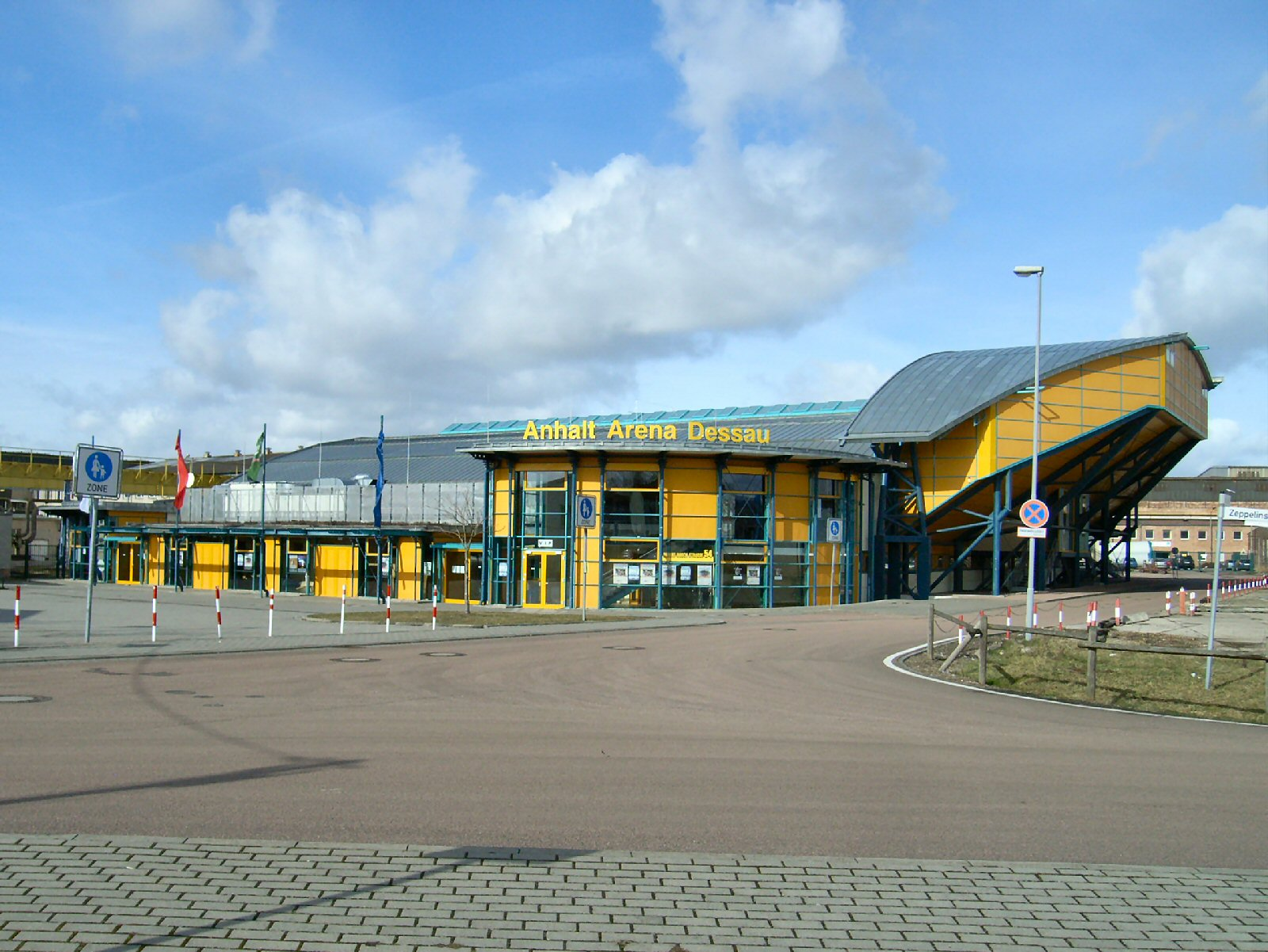
Anhalt Arena in 2009

- Numerous sports fields (more than 10)
- Skittle alleys (6)
- Tennis courts (3)
- Boathouses (3)
- Indoor swimming pools (2)
- Paul-Greifzu-Stadion (22,000 capacity)
- Speedskating course
- Zuckerturm climbing tower
- Anhalt Arena Dessau (3,600 capacity)
- Airfield Dessau
- Rifle range

== Governance ==
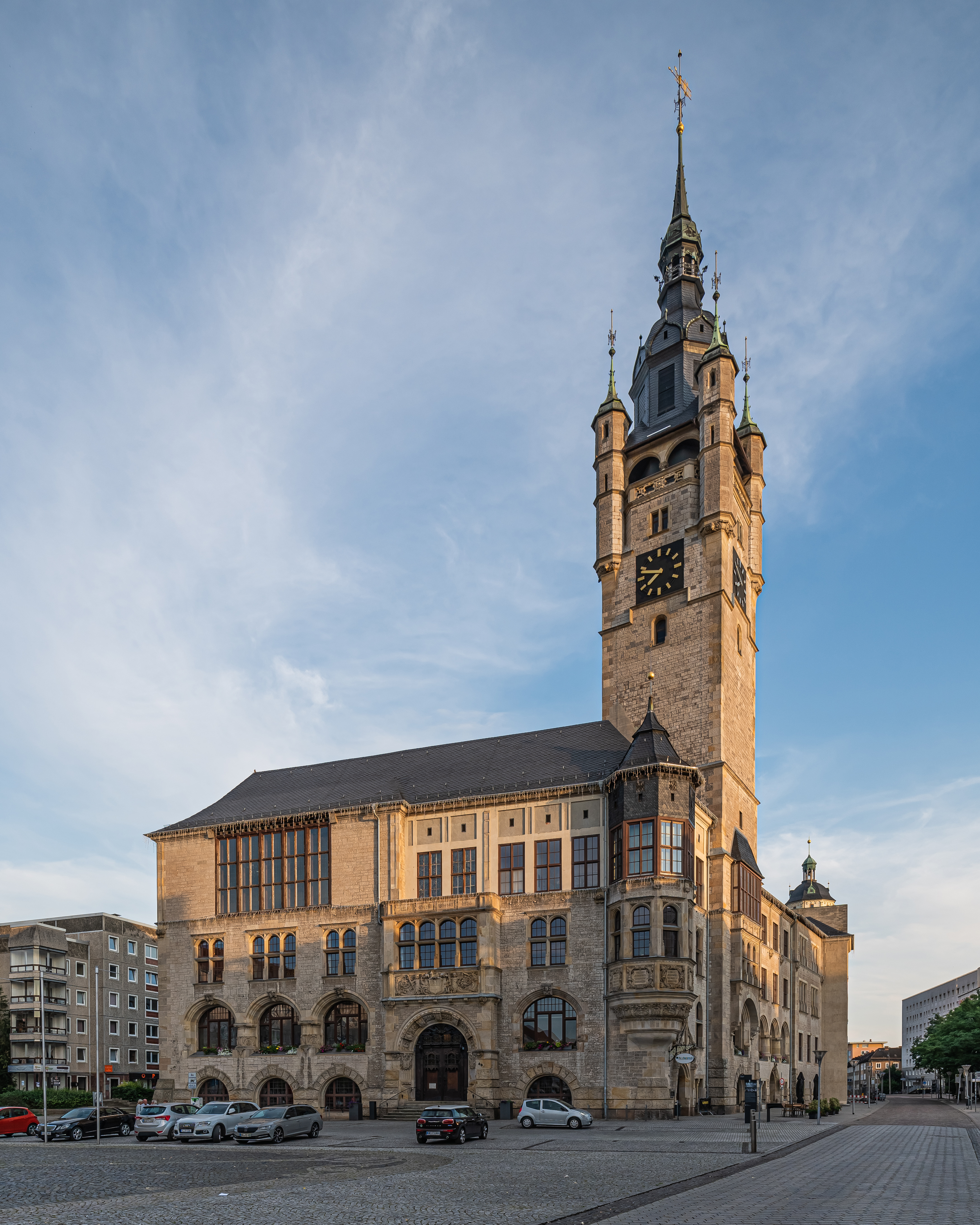
Town Hall

The borough of Dessau was first mentioned in 1372. The head of the town of Schultheiss was appointed by the count. Together with a few assessors, the Schultheiss formed the town council. As of 1372, the town council was divided into two agencies, as of 1600 into three agencies, and as of 1785 again into two agencies. The Schultheiss of Dessau changed nearly every year until the town council constitution was cancelled in 1832. Afterwards Dessau became a Town Council and a Town Delegation Constitution. Since 1852 the town leader has the title of mayor. During the National Socialist period the mayor was appointed by the party (NSDAP). After World War II, the Soviets formed an executive council with a mayor. The town council constitution was elected by the people. Since German reunification this committee has been freely elected. Since 1994 it has been called the Stadtrat. Since 1994, the mayor is directly elected by the people.

In 2007, Dessau became part of the municipality of Dessau-Roßlau.

=== Mayor ===
Peter Kuras (born 1958) was elected mayor of Dessau-Roßlau in June 2014 with 75.82% of the votes for a term of seven years. He is the successor of Klemens Koschig (born 1957, independent), who was elected in 2007 with 56.8% of the votes.

=== Town Council (Stadtrat) ===
Consists of the following parties: (Local elections from 25 May 2014)

- CDU (14 seats)
- The Left (11 seats)
- The Greens (3 seats)
- SPD (7 seats)
- Pro Dessau (5 seats)
- AfD (3 seats)
- FDP (2 seats)
- Neues Forum (2 seats)
- Bürgerliste (2 seats)
- NPD 1 seat

== Town twinning ==
Dessau is twinned with:

Argenteuil, France, since 1959; Gliwice, Poland, since 1992; (Germany) Ibbenbüren, North Rhine-Westphalia	Klagenfurt, Austria, since 1971; (Germany) Ludwigshafen, Rhineland-Palatinate, since 1988; Roudnice nad Labem, Czech Republic

== Education ==
- Anhalt University of Applied Sciences (Architecture, Facility Management, Design and Geoinformatics)
- Learning Centre from the German Chamber of Industry and Commerce (Halle/ Dessau)
- Anhalt Vocational School Centre Hugo Junkers I, II, and III (Chapon-School)
- Grammar School Walter Gropius
- Grammar School Liborius
- Grammar School "Philantropinum"

== European subsidies ==
Dessau is part of the EU-URBAN programme. This programme is based on the integrated approach that is used for tackling the environmental, economical and social problems, affecting the deprived urban areas. There are several projects in Dessau sponsored via this subsidy.

== Notable people ==
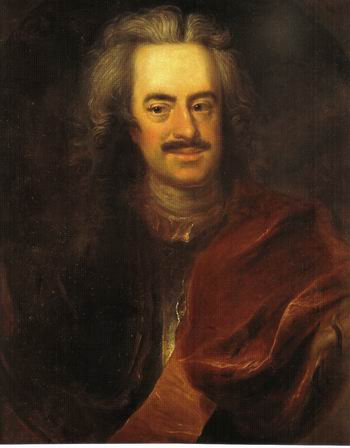
Leopold I, Prince of Anhalt-Dessau

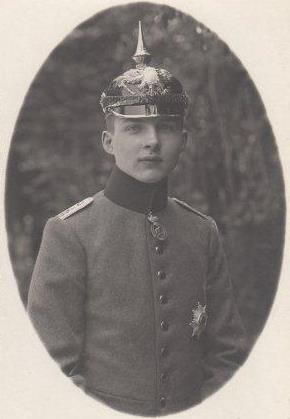
Joachim Ernst, Duke of Anhalt, 1918

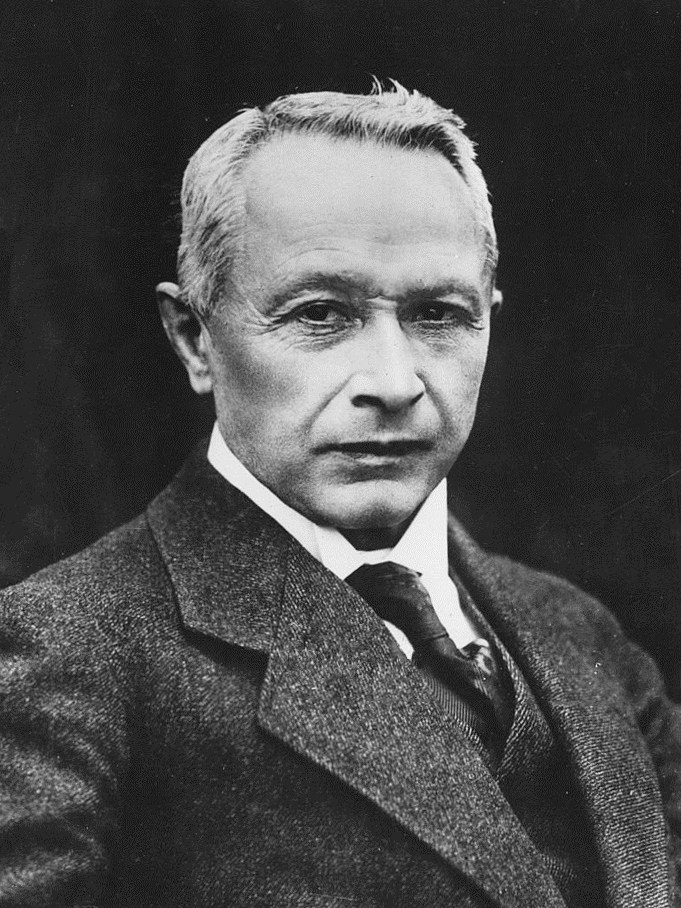
Hugo Junkers, 1920

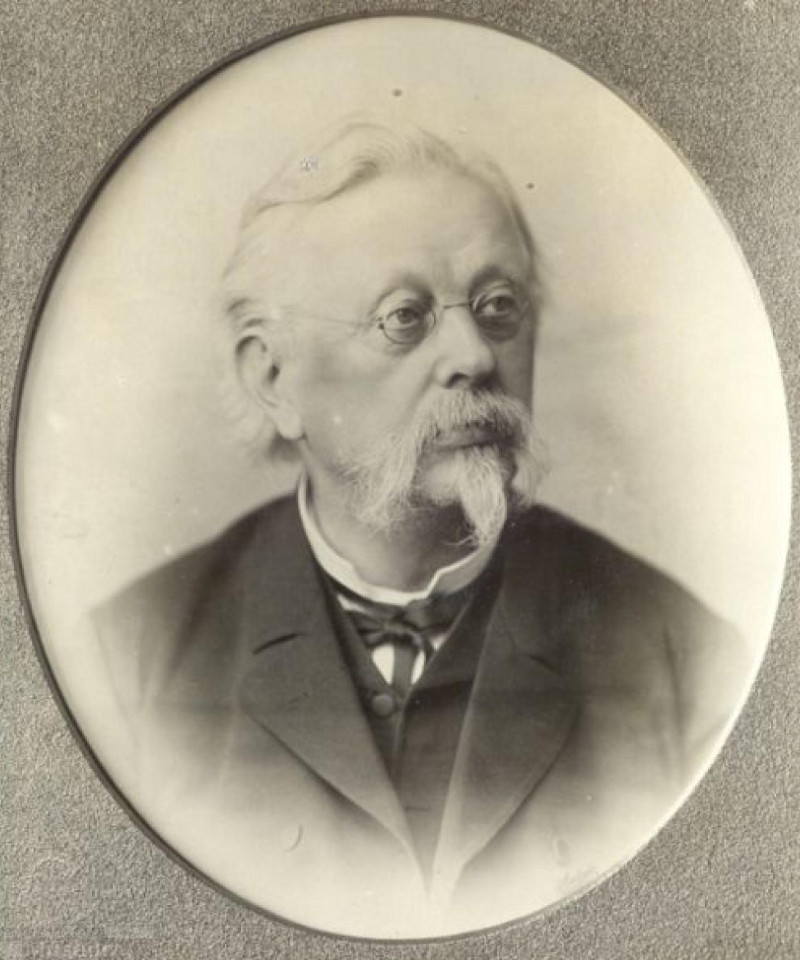
Wilhelm Rust 1885

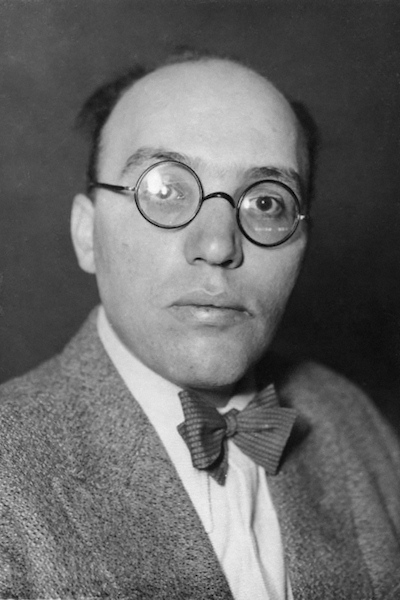
Kurt Weill, 1932

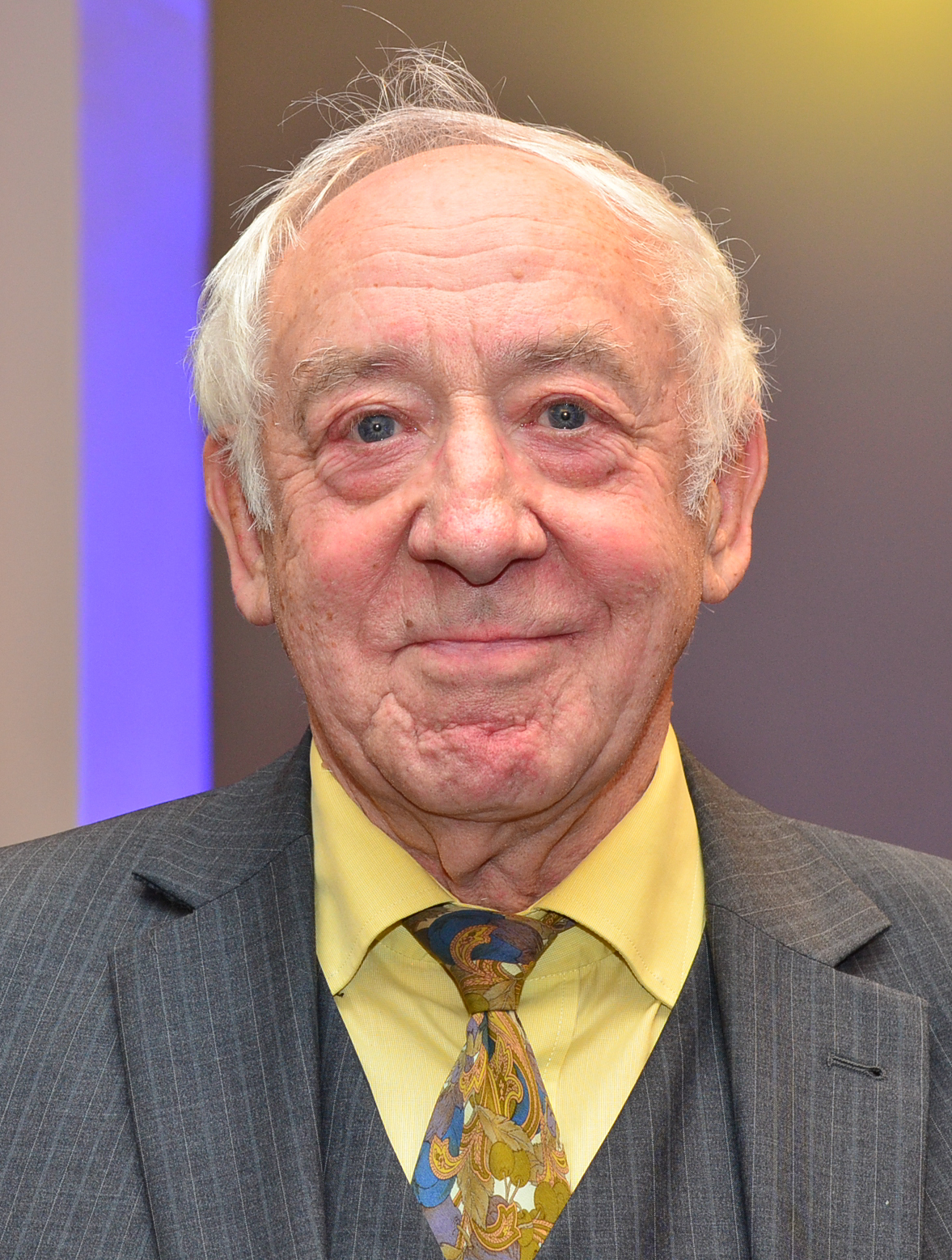
Dieter Hallervorden, 2013

=== Academics ===
- Peter Lebrecht Schmidt (1933–2019), German classical scholar

Moses Mendelssohn Jewish theologian and Spinozist philosopher.

== Business ==
- Georg Arnhold (1859-1926), banker
- Eduard Arnhold (1849-1925) industrialist
- Max Arnhold (1845-1908) banker

=== Aristocracy and military ===
- George III, Prince of Anhalt-Dessau (1507–1553), prince
- Bernhard VII, Prince of Anhalt-Zerbst (1540–1570), prince
- John Casimir, Prince of Anhalt-Dessau (1596–1660), prince
- John George II, Prince of Anhalt-Dessau (1627–1693), prince and Prussian field marshal
- Leopold I, Prince of Anhalt-Dessau (1676–1747), ruler of Anhalt-Dessau from 1693 to 1747
- Leopold II, Prince of Anhalt-Dessau (1700–1751), prince and Prussian general
- Dietrich of Anhalt-Dessau (1702–1769), prince and Prussian field marshal
- Princess Adelheid-Marie of Anhalt-Dessau (1833–1916), Duchess of Nassau and Grand Duchess of Luxembourg
- Eduard, Duke of Anhalt (1861–1918), Prince of the House of Ascania and the penultimate ruler of the Duchy of Anhalt in 1918
- Oswald Boelcke (1891-1916), World War I air ace
- Joachim Ernst, Duke of Anhalt (1901–1947), the last ruler of the Duchy of Anhalt

=== Science and philosophy ===
- Moses Mendelssohn (1729–1786), German Jewish philosopher, father of Haskalah
- Heinrich Schwabe (1789–1875), astronomer and botanist, worked on sunspots
- Karl Adolph von Basedow (1799–1854), a German physician
- Max Müller (1823–1900), philologist and Orientalist
- Franz Woepcke (1826–1864), an historian, Orientalist and mathematician
- Friedrich Preisigke (1856–1924), a German Egyptologist and papyrologist
- Hugo Junkers (1859–1935), German engineer and airplane designer, constructed first airplane made from metal, founded the Junkers & Co
- Gustav Lindau (1866–1923), mycologist and botanist
- Johannes Winkler (1897–1947), launched the first liquid-fuelled rocket in Europe at Dessau
- Hans von Ohain (1911–1998), physicist, designer of the first jet engine
- Gernot Böhme (1937–2022), philosopher and author

=== The arts ===
- Wilhelm Karl Rust (1787–1855), a German pianist
- Friedrich von Olivier (1791–1859), a German history painter in the Romantic style
- Wilhelm Müller (1794–1827), lyric poet, best known for the Lieder of Franz Schubert
- Ludwig Philippson (1811–1889), writer and rabbi, founder of Allgemeine Zeitung des Judentums
- Wilhelm Rust (1822–1892), composer, musicologist, Bach researcher and choirmaster
- Bernhard Cossmann (1822–1910), a German cellist
- Friedrich Grützmacher (1832–1903), cellist and composer
- Leopold Grützmacher (1835-1900), a German cellist and composer.
- Erna Schorlemmer (1875-1945), a German composer
- Julius Schubring (1839–1914), classical scholar
- Henriette Johanne Marie Müller (1841–1916), a street character identified with Hamburg
- August Klughardt (1847–1902), composer and conductor
- Kurt Weill (1900–1950), composer, grew up in Dessau, worked with Bertolt Brecht,
- Gerhard Nebel (1903–1974), writer, essayist and cultural critic
- Ursula Herking (1912–1974), actress and cabaret artist
- Anne-Marie Lauenstein (1923–2010), first German war bride to emigrate to the US in 1946
- Herbert Tobias (1924–1982), fashion photographer
- Horst Bollmann (1925–2014), a German film and television actor
- Gerhard Stolze (1926–1979), a German operatic tenor
- Karl-Heinz Kämmerling (1930–2012), professor of piano
- Brigitte Grothum (born 1935), a German film actress
- Dieter Hallervorden (born 1935), comedian, cabaret artist and singer, hon. citizen of Dessau
- Imi Knoebel (born 1940), a German artist of minimalist, abstract painting and sculpture
- Emil Schult (born 1946), painter, poet and musician
- Thomas Kretschmann (born 1962), actor
- Annette Schlünz (born 1964), a German musician and composer
- Michael Flade (born 1975), German composer of electronic music

=== Sports ===
- Ameli Koloska (born 1944), javelin thrower, competed in the 1968 Summer Olympics
- Danny Fuchs (born 1976), retired Bundesliga football player
- Carsten Rump (born 1981), a retired German footballer with 436 club caps

== Gallery ==
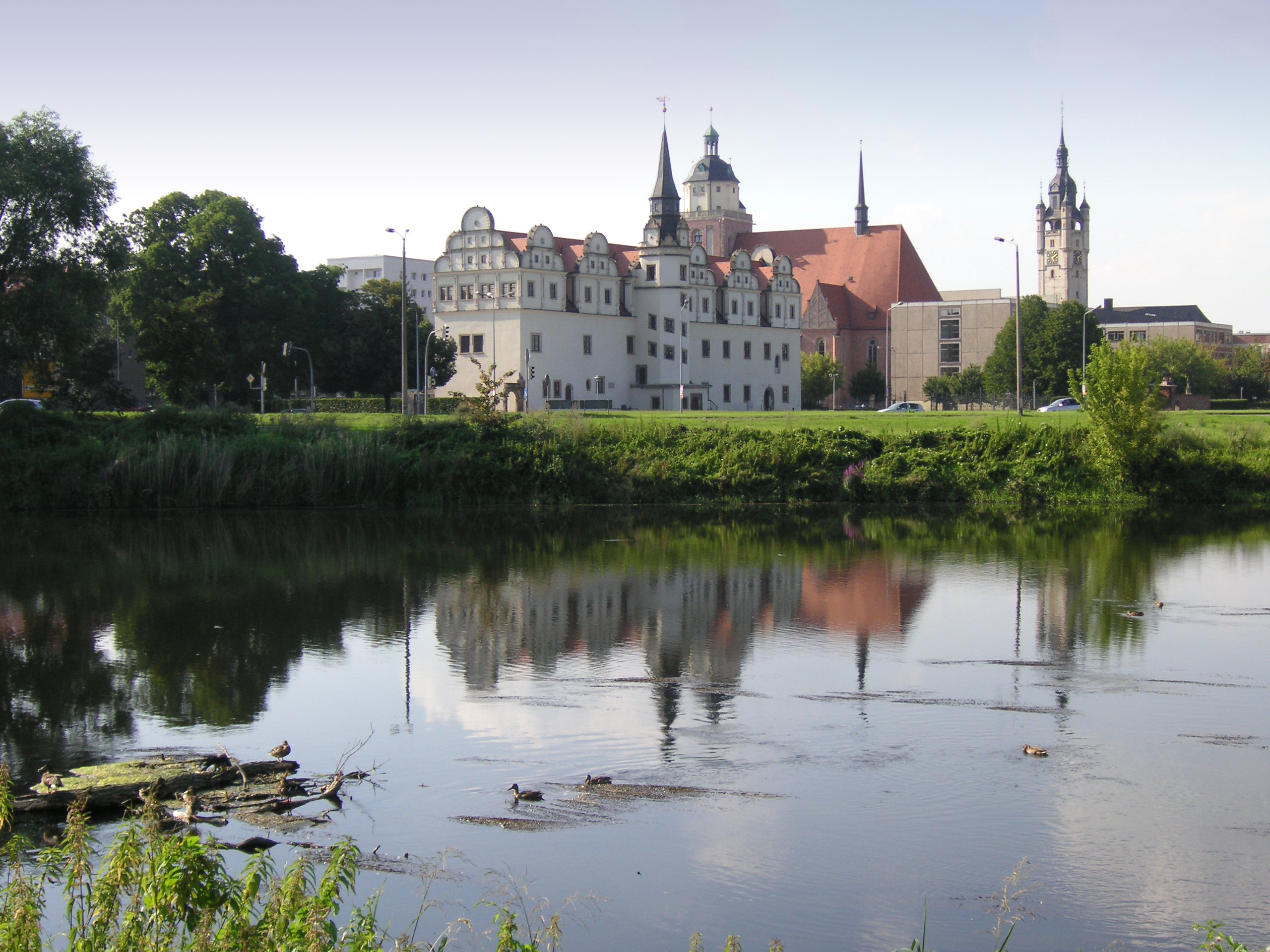
Dessau with the remains of the Dessau Palace and Mulde river

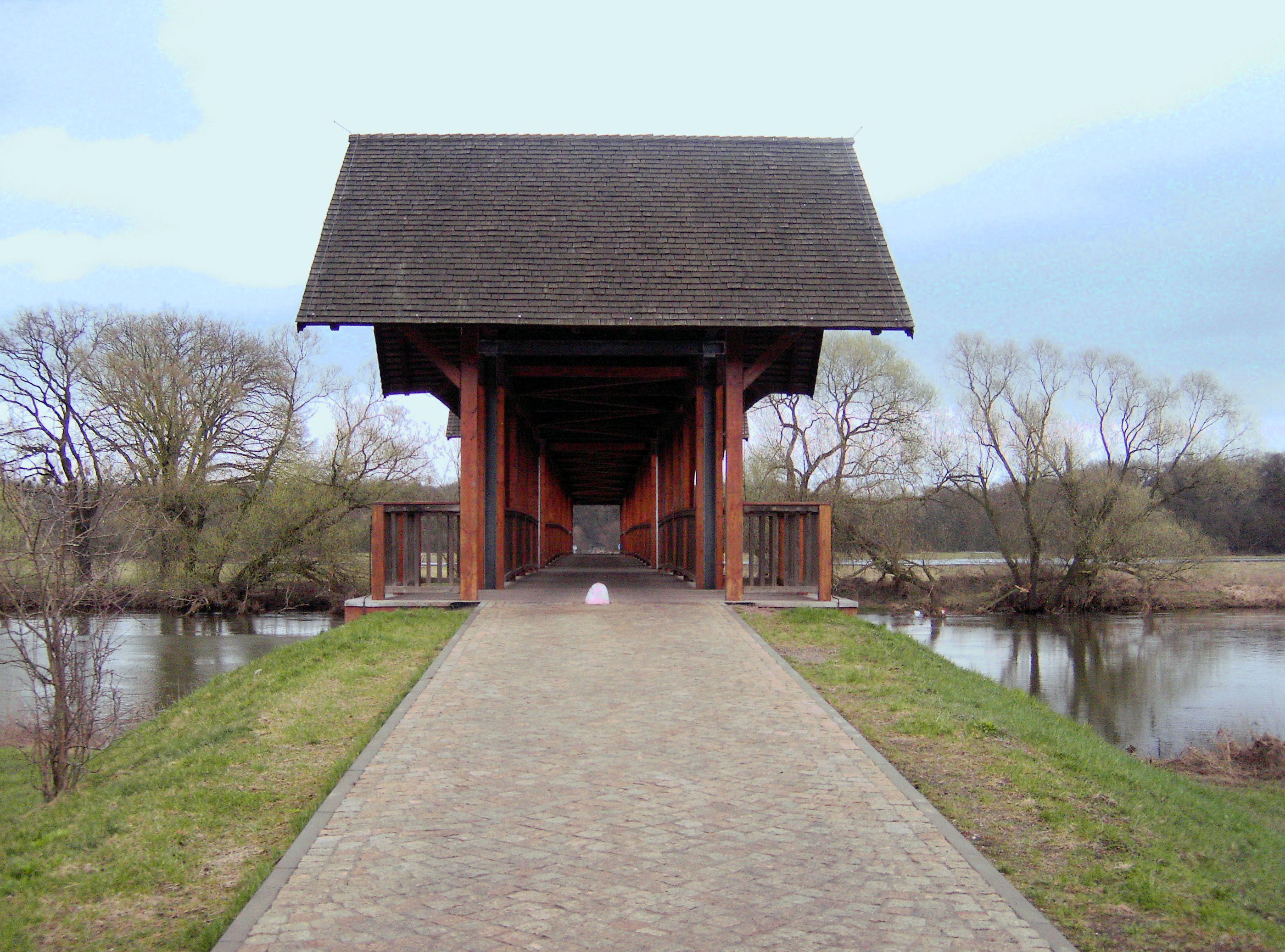
Hunting bridge over the Mulde (b. 1993)

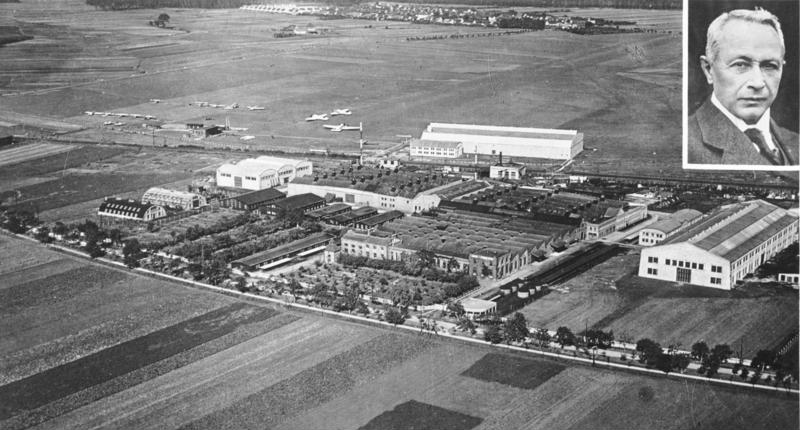
Junkers-works in Dessau and portrait of its founder

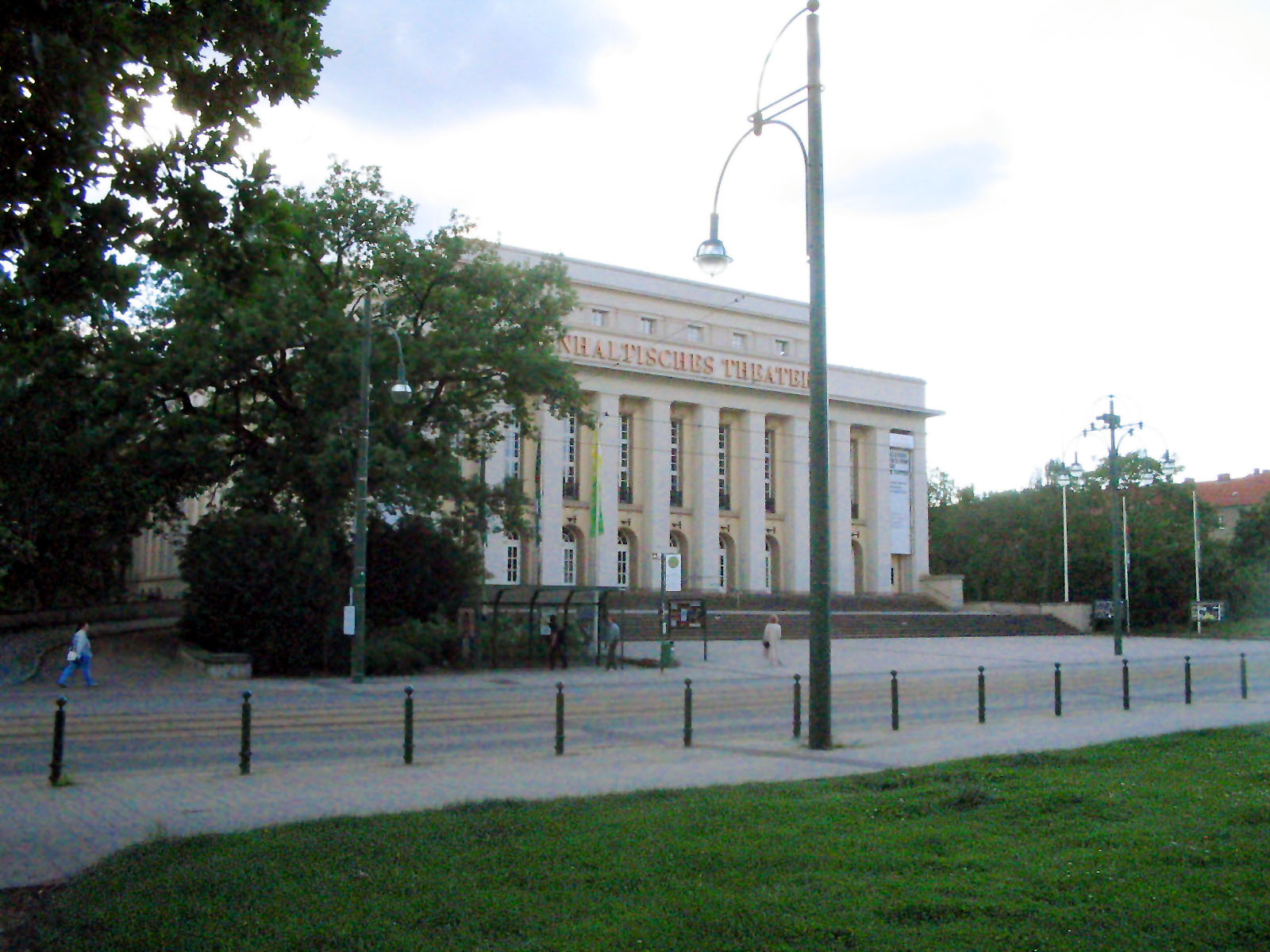
Anhaltisches Theater

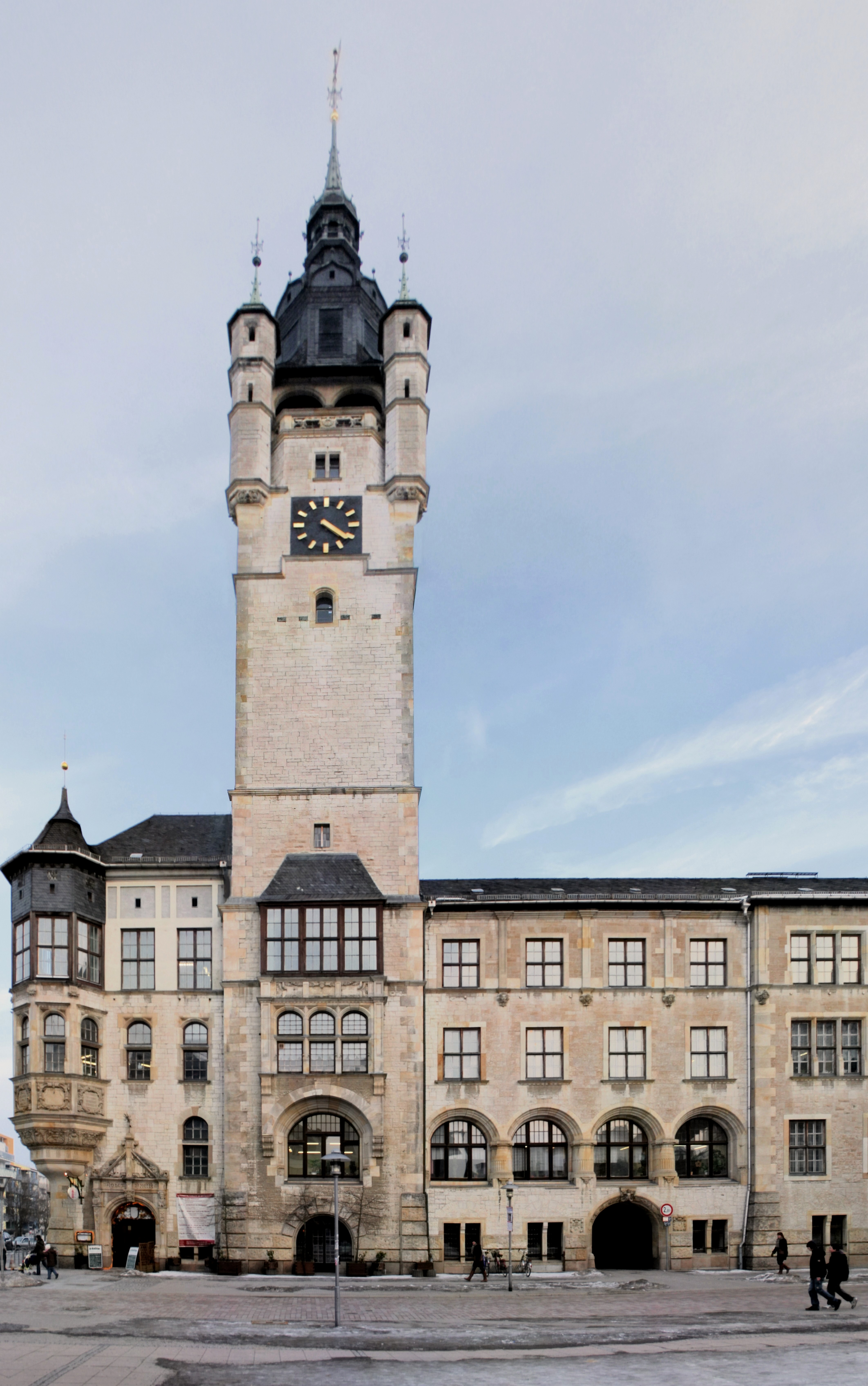
Side view of the Rathaus Dessau
