= St. Pauli Theater =

Theatre in Hamburg, Germany

Coordinates: 53°32′57″N 9°57′48″E

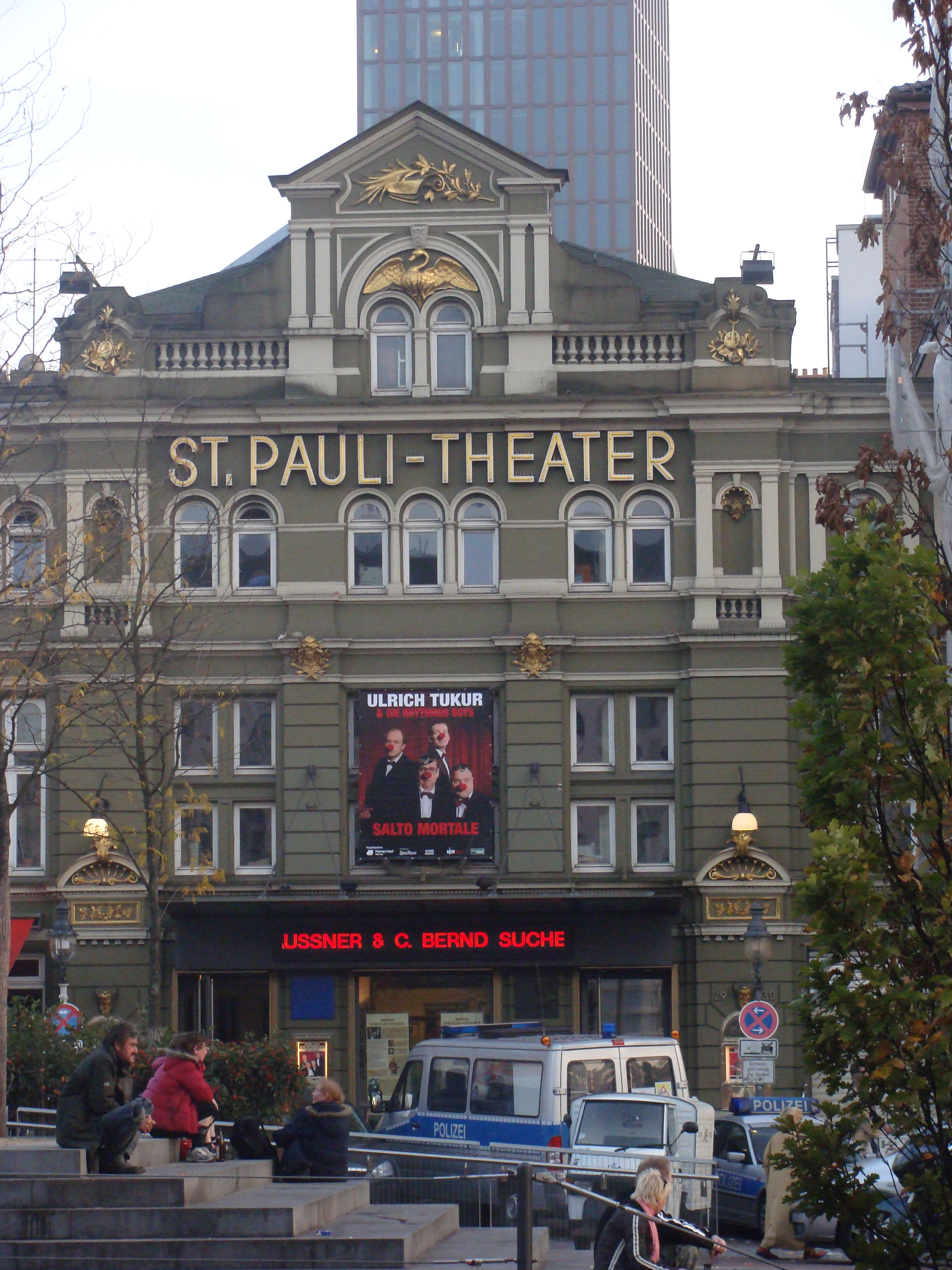
St. Pauli Theater

St. Pauli Theater is a theatre in Hamburg, Germany. It opened in 1841 as the Urania Theater and took its present name in 1941.
