= Peter Lebrecht Schmidt =

German classical scholar (1933–2019)

Peter Lebrecht Schmidt (28 July 1933, in Dessau, Germany – 22 October 2019, in Germany) was a German classical scholar. He was an authority on Cicero.

== Publications ==
- Handbuch der lateinischen Literatur der Antike by Reinhart Herzog and Peter Lebrecht Schmidt
- Die Uberlieferung von Ciceros Schrift 'De Legibus' in Mittelalter und Renaissance (Munich, 1974). Peter Lebrecht Schmidt
