= Dessau Palace =

Palace in Saxony-Anhalt, Germany

Coordinates: 51°49′56.4″N 12°14′53.5″E

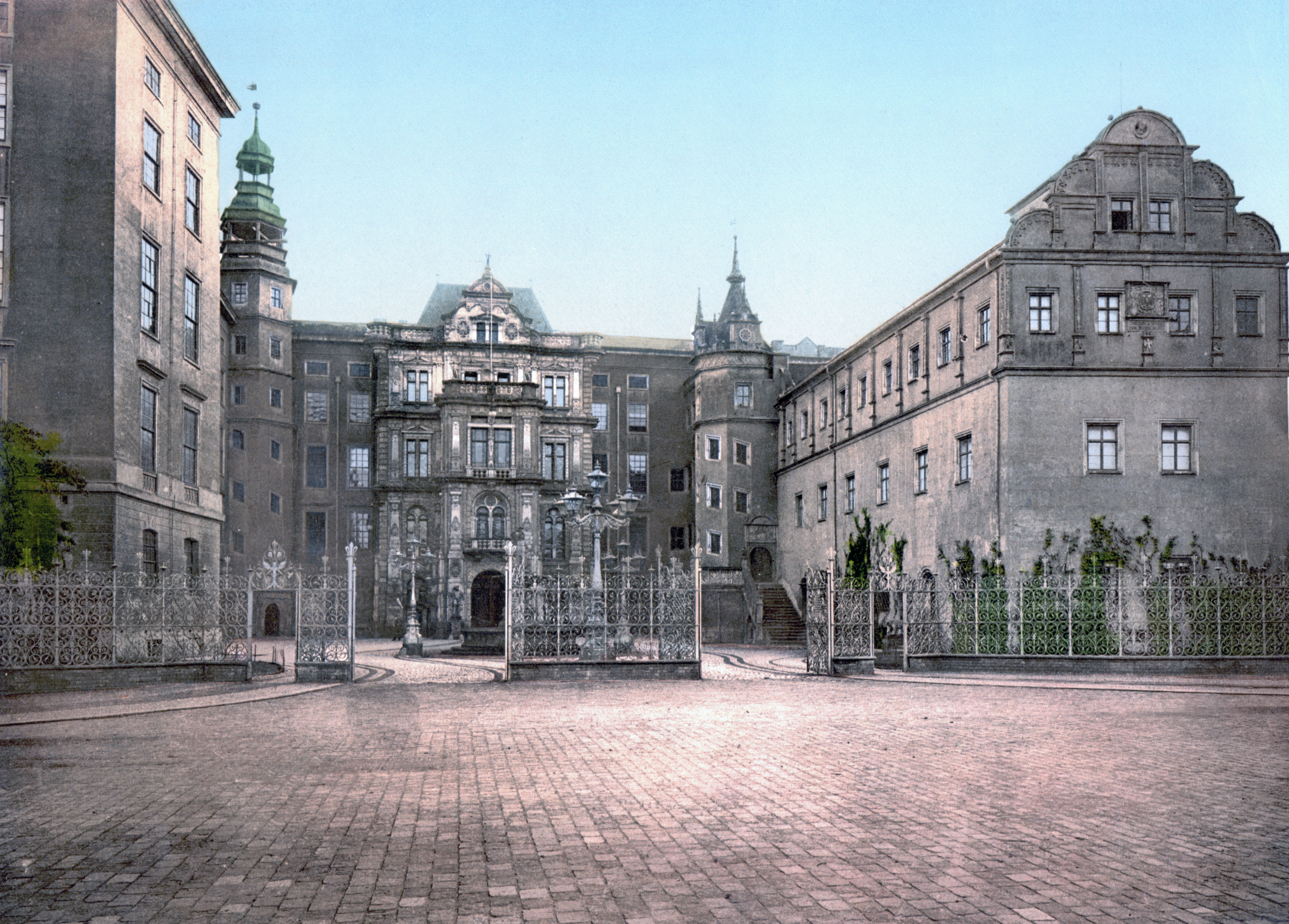
The Dessau City Palace around 1900

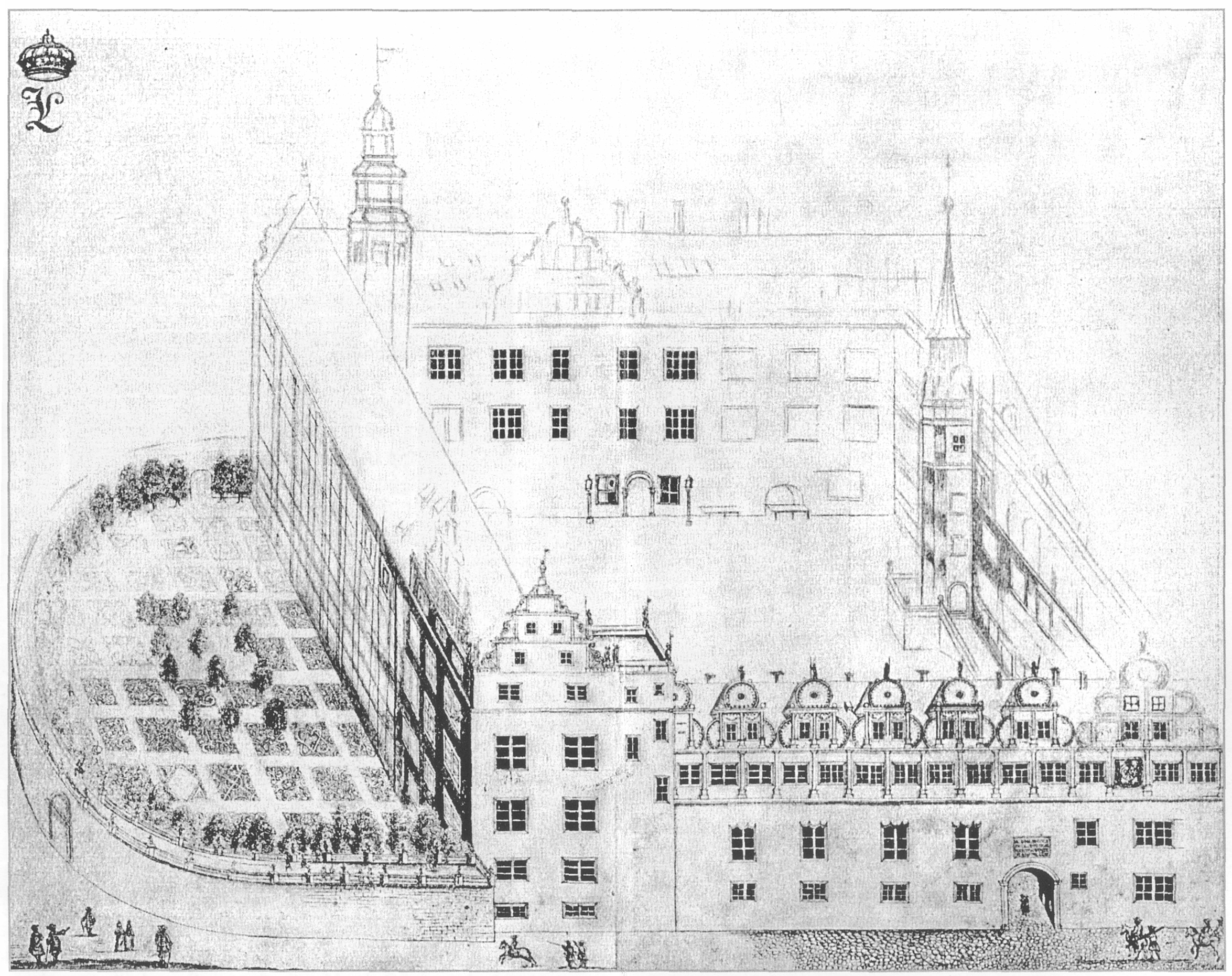
A four winged palace in the 17th century

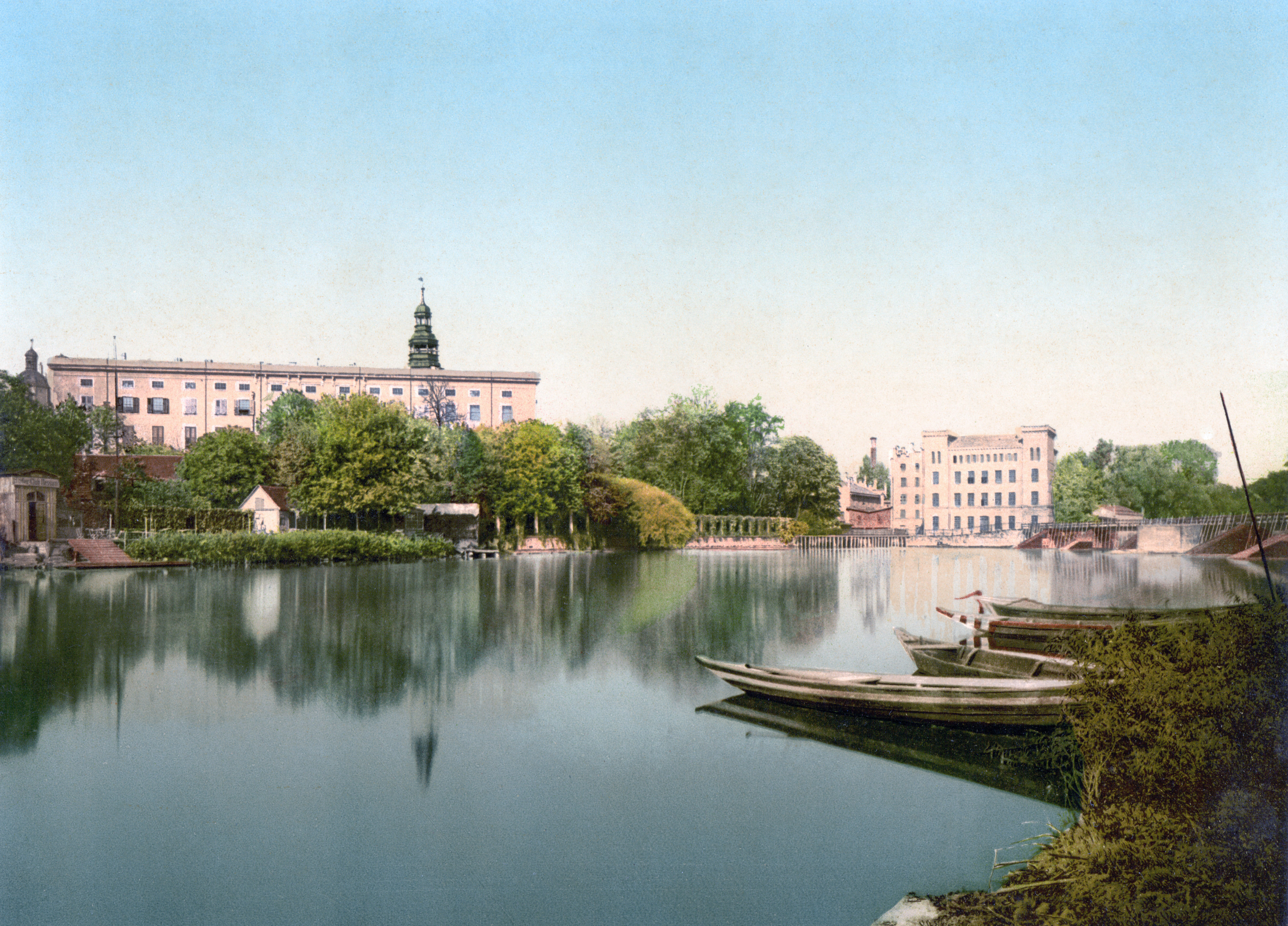
The Palace from the Mulde river around 1900

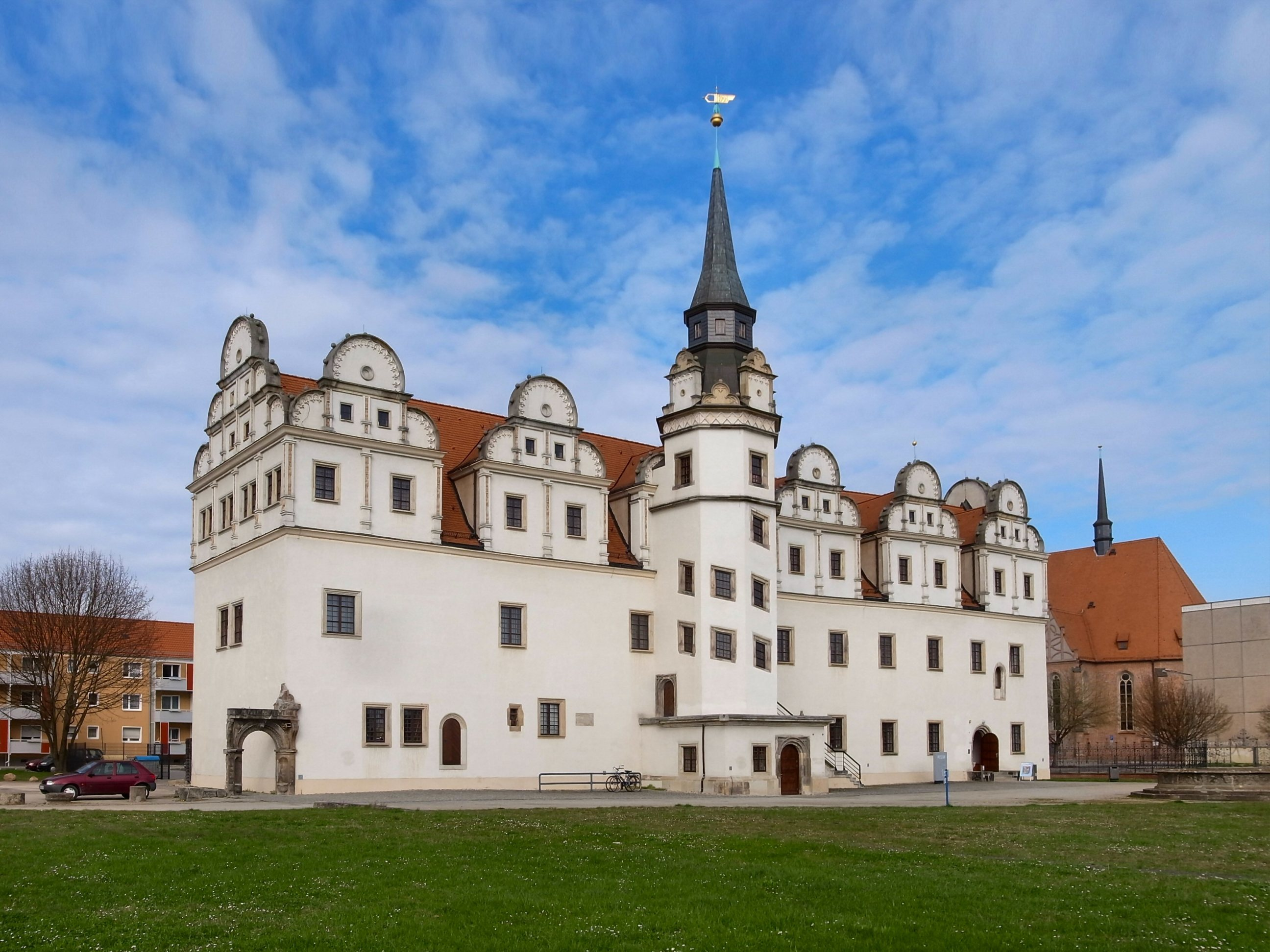
The Johannbau wing today

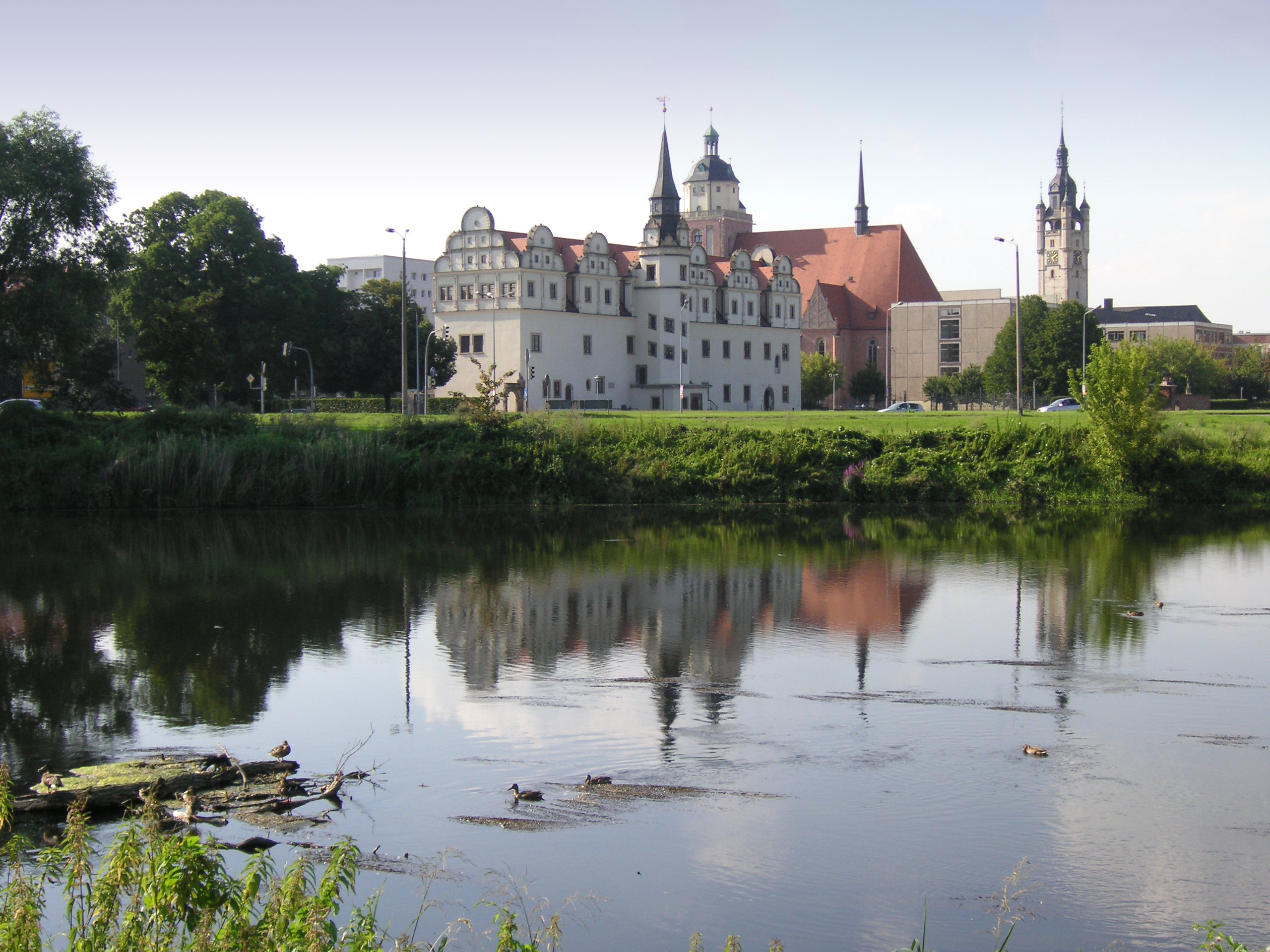
The Johannbau wing with in the back the Marienkirche and the city hall tower

The Dessau Palace (German: Residenzschloss Dessau or Stadtschloss Dessau) in Dessau in the German state of Saxony-Anhalt was a princely palace which mostly served as the main residence of the princes of Anhalt-Dessau and later the Dukes of Anhalt. The palace was one of the first renaissance buildings in the middle of Germany (see also: Saxon Renaissance). Today, there is only one wing remaining, the Johannbau, which offers room to the City History Museum of Dessau.

The Dessau Residence Palace was originally built in 1341 using stones from Waldeser Castle (also known as Waldersee Castle), which had been destroyed by flooding of the Mulde river. The palace was destroyed by fire in 1405 and again in 1467. In 1529, construction began on a new four-winged palace on the site of the former palace. Under the architect Georg Wenzeslaus von Knobelsdorff the palace was changed into an 18th-century three-winged palace.

The palace was heavily damaged during the Second World War, and its ruins were largely demolished in the times of the DDR. Only one wing, the Johannbau, is remaining. After restorations between 1990 and 1997, and between 2001 and 2005, the Johannbau has been opened for the public and houses now the museum for the history of Dessau.

Stylistically, the Johannbau is classified as early Renaissance, as the architectural decoration on the arched gables, windows, portals, and altar and the spiral stone rising above it has characteristic features such as spheres and lily tracery friezes. The formal language corresponds to the transitional period from the late Gothic to the Renaissance, as can also be found in other early buildings of the Saxon Renaissance.

== Literature ==
- Ilio Bußmeyer (1991). "Das Residenzschloß der Herzoge von Anhalt in Dessau". Burgen und Schlösser. Sonderheft. Braubach am Rhein: Deutsche Burgenvereinigung: 33–38.
- Barbara Czerannowski: Das Schloss zu Dessau. Eine Baugeschichte. In: Hans Wilderotter (Hg.): "Schauplatz vernünftiger Menschen" Kultur und Geschichte in Anhalt-Dessau, Berlin: L-und-H-Verlag 2006, ISBN 3-938608-00-5, S. 17–42.
- Neugebauer, Anke (2015). "Das Dessauer Residenzschloss im Jahrhundert der Reformation". In Michels, Norbert (ed.). Cranach in Anhalt Von Alten zum Neuen Glauben – Kataloge der Anhaltischen Gemäldegalerie Dessau. Michael Imhof verlag. pp. 93–106. ISBN 978-3731902270.
