= Lippe-Brake =

Former monarchy in Europe

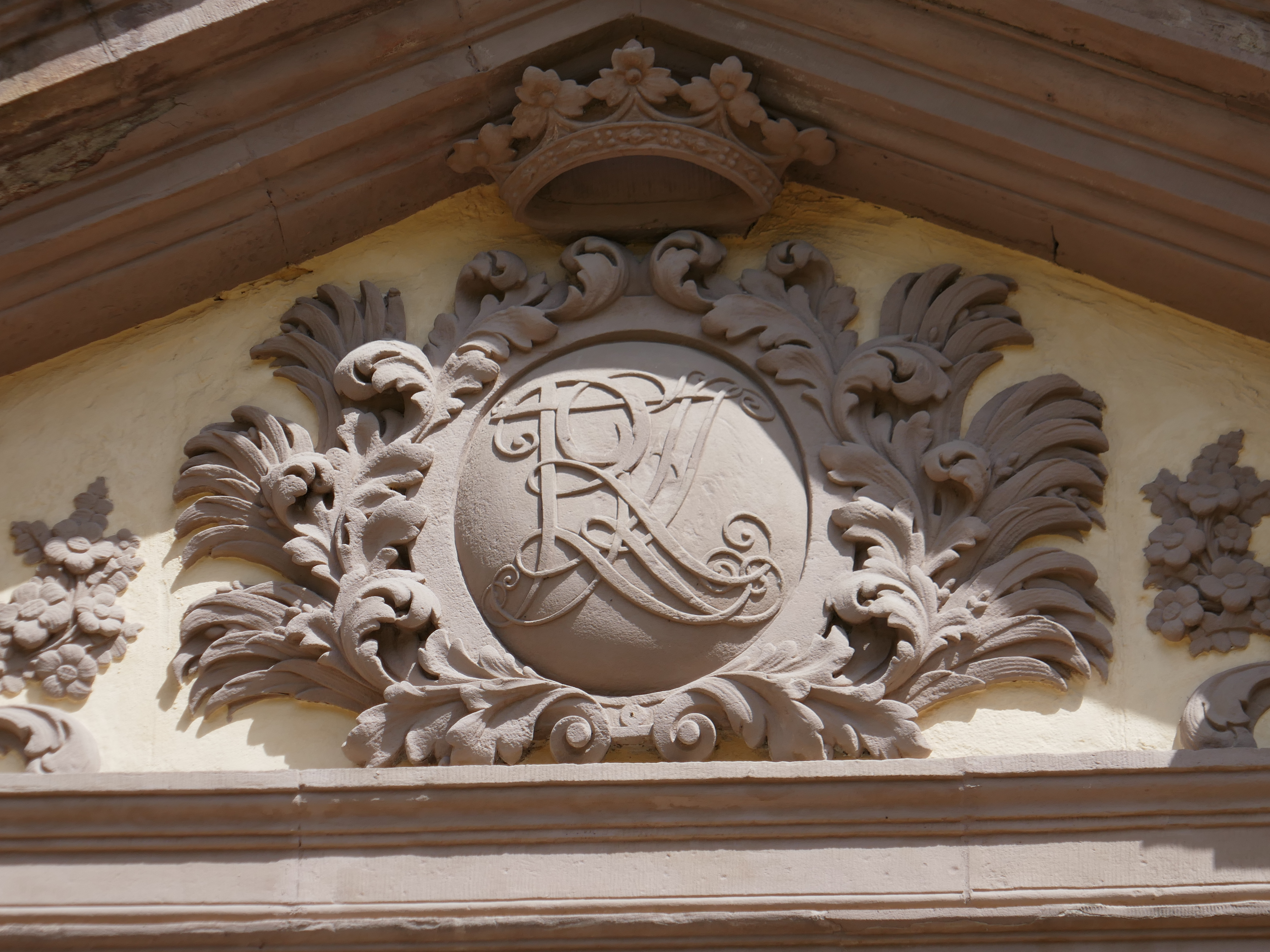
Monogramm of Count Rudolph zur Lippe-Brake (1664-1707)

Lippe-Brake was a county during the 17th century, located in Lippe, Germany, and ruled by a branch of the House of Lippe.

== History ==
The county was created in 1621 for Otto, Count of Lippe-Brake, second son of Count Simon VI of Lippe who had died in 1613. Otto's elder brother Simon VII ruled Lippe-Detmold, while his younger brother Philip I, Count of Schaumburg-Lippe inherited Lippe-Alverdissen and founded the Schaumburg-Lippe branch following an inheritance in 1640.

On the death of Count Louis Ferdinand in 1709 Lippe-Brake was inherited by the senior Lippe-Detmold line.

== Properties ==
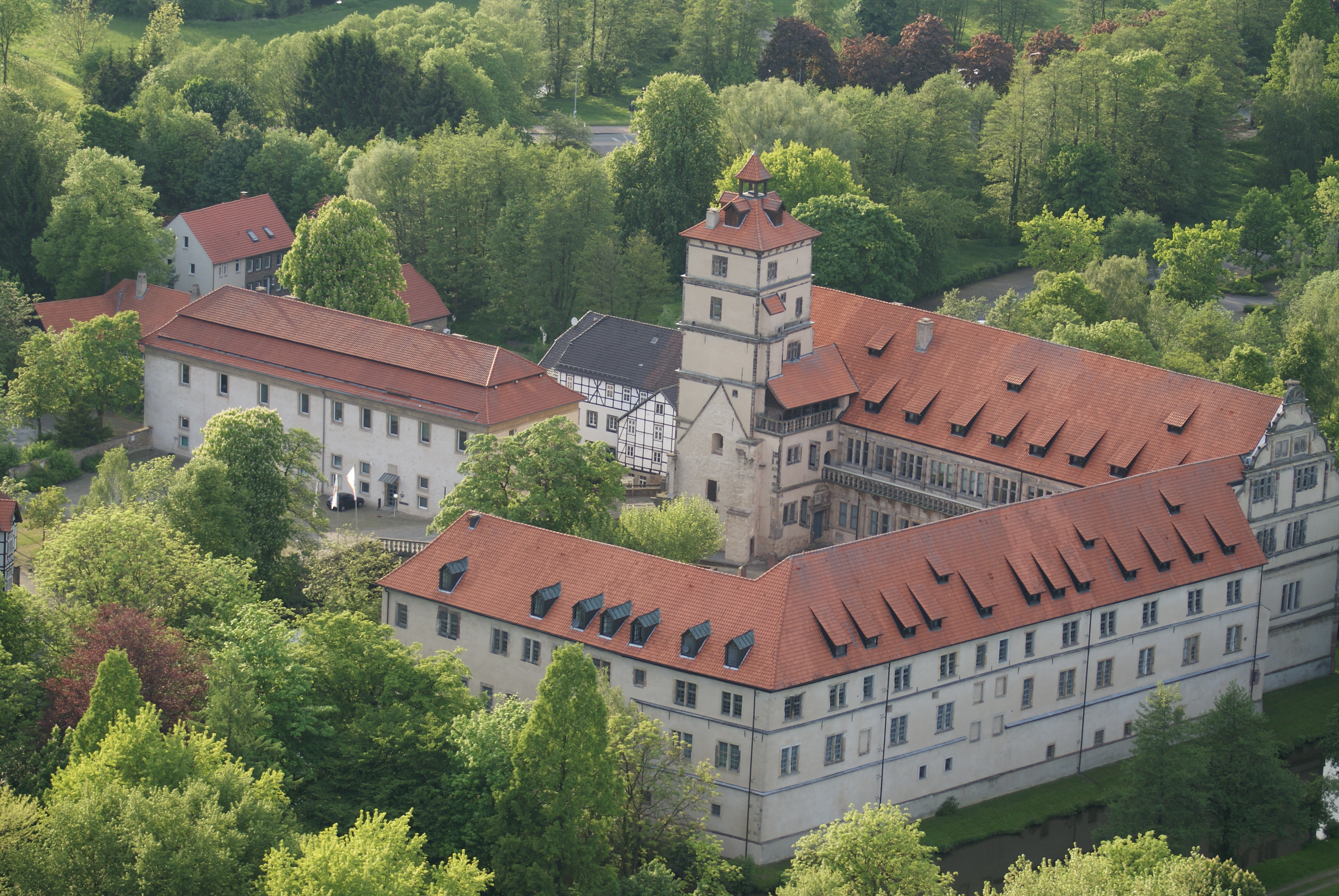
Brake Castle, Lemgo

== See also ==
- List of consorts of Lippe
