= List of consorts of Lippe =

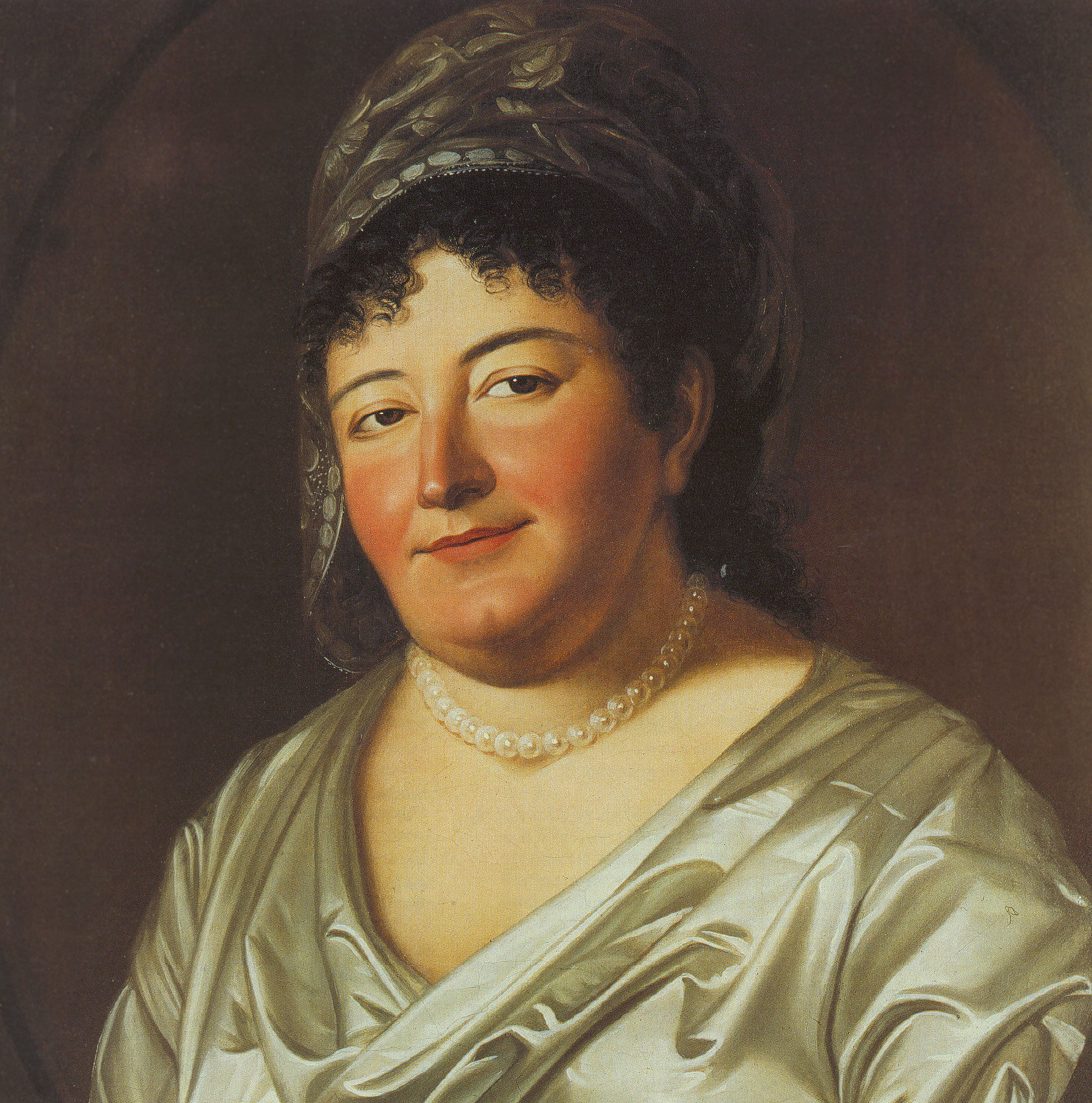
Pauline of Anhalt-Bernburg, Princess of Lippe. The perhaps most famous of all the consorts of Lippe. she was later the regent of Lippe.

== Countess of Lippe ==
=== House of Lippe, 1528–1613 ===
Picture	Name	Father	Birth	Marriage	Became Countess	Ceased to be Countess	Death	Spouse
	Magdalene of Mansfeld-Mittelort	Gebhard VII, Count of Mansfeld-Mittelort (Mansfeld)	1509/10	16 March 1524	1528 became countess	17 September 1536 husband's death	23 January 1540	Simon V
	Catherine of Waldeck-Eisenberg	Philip III, Count of Waldeck-Eisenberg (Waldeck)	1524	8 May 1550		15 April 1563 husband's death	18 June 1583	Bernhard VIII
	Armgard, Countess of Rietberg	John II, Count of Rietberg (Rietberg)	1551	11/26 May 1578		31 July 1584		Simon VI
	Elisabeth of Holstein-Schaumburg	Otto IV, Count of Holstein-Schaumburg (Schaumburg)	3 August 1566	13 November 1585		7 December 1613 husband's death	7 September 1638	Simon VI

== Countess of Lippe-Detmold ==
=== House of Lippe, 1613–1789 ===
Picture	Name	Father	Birth	Marriage	Became Countess	Ceased to be Countess	Death	Spouse
	Anna Katharina of Nassau-Wiesbaden-Idstein	John Louis I, Count of Nassau-Wiesbaden-Idstein (Nassau-Wiesbaden-Idstein)	4 December 1590	6 May 1607	7 December 1613 husband's accession	6 January 1622		Simon VII
	Maria Magdalene of Waldeck-Wildungen	Christian, Count of Waldeck-Wildungen (Waldeck-Wildungen)	27 April 1606	27 April 1623		26 March 1627 husband's death	28 May 1671	Simon VII
	Katharina of Waldeck-Wildungen	Christian, Count of Waldeck-Wildungen (Waldeck-Wildungen)	20 October 1612	19 June 1631		8 August 1636 husband's death	24 November 1649	Simon Louis
	Ernestine of Isenburg-Büdingen-Birstein	Wolfgang Henry, Count of Isenburg-Büdingen-Birstein (Isenburg)	9 February 1614	1 January 1648	10 June 1652 husband's accession	5 December 1665		Herman Adolph
	Amalia of Lippe-Brake	Otto, Count of Lippe-Brake (Lippe)	20 September 1629	27 February 1666		10 October 1666 husband's death	19 August 1676	Herman Adolph
	Amalia of Dohna-Schlobitten	Christian Albert, Burgrave and Count of Dohna (Dohna-Schlobitten)	2 February 1644	15/27 September 1666	10 October 1666 husband's accession	12 May 1697 husband's death	11 March 1700	Simon Henry
	Johanna Elisabeth of Nassau-Dillenburg	Adolph, Prince of Nassau-Schaumburg (Nassau-Dillenburg)	5 September 1663	16 June 1692	12 May 1697 husband's accession	9 February/18 July 1700		Frederick Adolphus
	Amalia of Solms-Hohensolms	Louis, Count of Solms-Hohensolms (Solms-Hohensolms)	13 October 1678	16 June 1700		18 July 1718 husband's death	14 February 1746	Frederick Adolphus
	Johannette Wilhelmine of Nassau-Idstein	George August, Count of Nassau-Idstein (Nassau-Idstein)	14 September 1700	16 October 1719		12 October 1734 husband's death	2 June 1756	Simon Henry Adolph
	Polyxena Louise of Nassau-Weilburg	Charles August, Prince of Nassau-Weilburg (Nassau-Weilburg)	27 January 1733	24 August 1750		27 September 1764		Simon Augustus
	Maria Leopoldine of Anhalt-Dessau	Leopold II, Prince of Anhalt-Dessau (Ascania)	18 November 1746	28 September 1765		15 April 1769		Simon Augustus
	Casimire of Anhalt-Dessau	Leopold II, Prince of Anhalt-Dessau (Ascania)	19 January 1749	9 November 1769		8 November 1778		Simon Augustus
	Christine Charlotte of Solms-Braunfels	Frederick William, Prince of Solms-Braunfels (Solms-Braunfels)	30 August 1744	26 March 1780		1 May 1782 husband's death	16 December 1823	Simon Augustus

== Countess of Lippe-Alverdissen ==
=== House of Lippe, 1613–1640 and 1681–1777 ===
Picture	Name	Father	Birth	Marriage	Became Countess	Ceased to be Countess	Death	Spouse
	Dorothea Amalia of Schleswig-Holstein-Sonderburg-Beck	August Philipp, Duke of Schleswig-Holstein-Sonderburg-Beck (Schleswig-Holstein-Sonderburg-Beck)	1656	31 December 1686		13 June 1728 husband's death	9 November 1739	Philipp Ernest I
	Elisabeth Philippine von Friesenhausen	Philipp Sigismund von Friesenhausen (Friesenhausen)	19 August 1696	27 September 1722	13 June 1728 husband's death	1749 husband's abdication?	4 August 1764	Frederick Ernest
	Ernestine Albertine of Saxe-Weimar	Ernest Augustus I, Duke of Saxe-Weimar (Wettin)	28 December 1722	6 May 1756		25 November 1769		Philipp Ernest II

== Countess of Lippe-Brake ==
=== House of Lippe, 1613–1709 ===
Picture	Name	Father	Birth	Marriage	Became Countess	Ceased to be Countess	Death	Spouse
	Margarete of Nassau-Dillenburg	George, Count of Nassau-Dillenburg (Nassau-Dillenburg)	5 September 1606	5 October 1626		18 November 1657 husband's death	30 January 1661	Otto
	Anna Amalie of Sayn-Wittgenstein-Homburg	Ernest, Count of Sayn-Wittgenstein-Homburg (Sayn-Wittgenstein-Homburg)	6 December 1641	28 May 1663		27 March 1685		Casimir
	Dorothea Elisabeth of Waldeck	Christian Louis, Count of Waldeck (Waldeck)	6 July 1661	4 November 1691	12 March 1700 husband's accession	23 July 1702		Rudolph

== Countess of Lippe-Biesterfeld ==
=== House of Lippe, 1762–1905 ===
Picture	Name	Father	Birth	Marriage	Became Countess	Ceased to be Countess	Death	Spouse
	Modeste von Unruh	Karl Philipp von Unruh (Unruh)	29 April 1781	26 July 1803	19 November 1810 husband's accession	8 January 1840 husband's death	9 September 1854	Ernest I
	Adelheid of Castell-Castell	Frederick, Count of Castell-Castell (Castell-Castell)	18 June 1818	30 April 1839	8 January 1840 husband's accession	17 May 1884 husband's death	11 July 1900	Julius
	Karoline of Wartensleben	Count Leopold of Wartensleben (Wartensleben)	6 April 1844	16 September 1869	17 May 1884 husband's accession	26 September 1904 husband's death	10 July 1905	Ernest II
	Bertha of Hesse-Philippsthal-Barchfeld	Prince William of Hesse-Philippsthal-Barchfeld (Hesse-Philippsthal-Barchfeld)	25 October 1874	16 August 1901	26 September 1904 husband's accession	25 October 1905 became Princess of Lippe	19 February 1919	Leopold

== Countess of Lippe-Weissenfeld ==
=== House of Lippe, 1762–1882? ===
Picture	Name	Father	Birth	Marriage	Became Countess	Ceased to be Countess	Death	Spouse
	Ernestine Henriette of Solms-Baruth	John Christian I, Count of Solms-Baruth (Solms-Baruth)	23 May 1712	30 October 1736	24 May 1762 husband's accession	17 November 1769		Ferdinand I
	Eleonore Gustave of Thermo	Heinrich Adolf Gustav, Baron of Thermo (Thermo)	19 October 1789	23 November 1804		21 June 1846 husband's death	28 February 1868	Ferdinand II
	Ida of Lippe-Weissenfeld	Count Hugo of Lippe-Weissenfeld (Lippe-Weissenfeld)	16 January 1819	21 August 1843	21 June 1846 husband's accession	18 March 1878		Gustav

== Countess of Schaumburg-Lippe ==
=== House of Lippe, 1640–1807 ===
Picture	Name	Father	Birth	Marriage	Became Countess	Ceased to be Countess	Death	Spouse
	Sophie of Hesse-Kassel	Maurice, Landgrave of Hesse-Kassel (Hesse-Kassel)	12 September 1615	13 October 1644		22 November 1670		Philip I
	Johanna Sophia of Hohenlohe-Langenburg	Heinrich Friedrich, Count of Hohenlohe-Langenburg (Hohenlohe-Langenburg)	26 December 1673	24 January 1691		1723 divorce	18 August 1743	Frederick Christian
	Anna Maria von Gall	Baron Johann Michael von Gall (Gall)	1707	3 December 1725		13 June 1728 husband's death	29 July 1760	Frederick Christian
	Margarete Gertrud of Oeynhausen	George I of Great Britain (Oeynhausen)	19 April 1698	30 October 1721	13 June 1728 husband's accession	8 April 1726		Albert Wolfgang
	Charlotte Friederike of Nassau-Siegen	Frederick William Adolf, Prince of Nassau-Siegen (Nassau-Siegen)	30 November 1702	26 April 1730		24 September 1748 husband's death	22 July 1785	Albert Wolfgang
	Marie Barbara Eleonore of Lippe-Biesterfeld	Frederick, Count of Lippe-Biesterfeld (Lippe-Biesterfeld)	16 June 1744	12 November 1765		16 June 1776		William
	Juliane of Hesse-Philippsthal	William, Landgrave of Hesse-Philippsthal (Hesse-Philippsthal)	8 June 1761	10 October 1780		13 February 1787 husband's death	9 November 1799	Philip II

== Princess of Lippe ==
=== House of Lippe, 1789–1918 ===
Picture	Name	Father	Birth	Marriage	Became Princess	Ceased to be Princess	Death	Spouse
	Pauline of Anhalt-Bernburg	Frederick Albert, Prince of Anhalt-Bernburg (Ascania)	23 February 1769	2 January 1796		5 November 1802 husband's death	29 December 1820	Leopold I
	Emilie of Schwarzburg-Sondershausen	Günther Friedrich Karl I, Prince of Schwarzburg-Sondershausen (Schwarzburg-Sondershausen)	23 April 1800	23 April 1820		1 January 1851 husband's death	2 April 1867	Leopold II
	Elisabeth of Schwarzburg-Rudolstadt	Albert, Prince of Schwarzburg-Rudolstadt (Schwarzburg-Rudolstadt)	1 October 1833	17 April 1852		8 December 1875 husband's death	27 November 1896	Leopold III
	Sophie of Baden	Prince William of Baden (Zähringen)	7 August 1834	9 November 1858	8 December 1875 husband's accession	20 March 1895 husband's death	6 April 1904	Woldemar
	Bertha of Hesse-Philippsthal-Barchfeld	Prince William of Hesse-Philippsthal-Barchfeld (Hesse-Philippsthal-Barchfeld)	25 October 1874	16 August 1901	25 October 1905 husband's accession	12 November 1918 husband's abdication	19 February 1919	Leopold IV

== Princess of Schaumburg-Lippe ==
=== House of Lippe, 1807–1918 ===
Picture	Name	Father	Birth	Marriage	Became Princess	Ceased to be Princess	Death	Spouse
	Ida of Waldeck and Pyrmont	George I, Prince of Waldeck and Pyrmont (Waldeck-Pyrmont)	26 September 1796	23 June 1816		21 November 1860 husband's death	12 April 1869	George William
	Hermine of Waldeck and Pyrmont	George II, Prince of Waldeck and Pyrmont (Waldeck-Pyrmont)	29 September 1827	25 October 1844	21 November 1860 husband's accession	8 May 1893 husband's death	16 February 1910	Adolf I
	Marie Anne of Saxe-Altenburg	Prince Moritz of Saxe-Altenburg (Saxe-Altenburg)	14 March 1864	16 April 1882	8 May 1893 husband's accession	29 April 1911 husband's death	3 May 1918	Georg
