= Simon VI =

Simon VI may refer to:

- Simon de Montfort, 6th Earl of Leicester (c. 1208 – 1265)
- Simon de Montfort the Younger (1240–1271)
- Simon VI, Count of Lippe (1544–1613)
