= Ulrich Born =

German lawyer and politician

Ulrich Born (born 15 May 1950 in Barntrup, North Rhine-Westphalia) is a German lawyer and politician, representative of the German Christian Democratic Union.

== Biography ==
=== Background ===
Born began studying law and political science in Marburg and Munich. From 1975 to 1978 he worked as a research assistant at the Faculty of Law and Economics, at the Philipps University of Marburg and further studied additional administrative sciences at the College of Administrative Sciences Speyer. After a legal degree in 1980, he worked as a Lecturer at the Law and Economics Faculty of the University of Bayreuth .

Later Born became a member of the National Synod of the Evangelical Lutheran Church of Mecklenburg. He currently resides in Pingelshagen in North Mecklenburg.

=== Career ===
Born became a member of the CDU in 1967. After the political changes in East Germany, he moved into the Mecklenburg-Western Pomerania politics and was elected chairman of the Northwest District Association Mecklenburg. He is also the state chairman of the Protestant Working Group (EAK), for the CDU Mecklenburg-Western Pomerania.

From 1994 to 2006 he was a member of the Landtag of Mecklenburg-Western Pomerania and Vice Chairman of the CDU. Today he is a member of the Northwest Mecklenburg County Council, and is the President of the County Council.

On 27 October 1990 he was also appointed as Minister of Justice, Federal and European Affairs in the government led by Prime Minister Alfred Gomolka of Mecklenburg-Western Pomerania. On 14 March 1992, however, he was dismissed by the Prime Minister from this office before Gomolka himself resigned.

== See also ==
- List of German Christian Democratic Union politicians
