= Lippe (district) =

- District
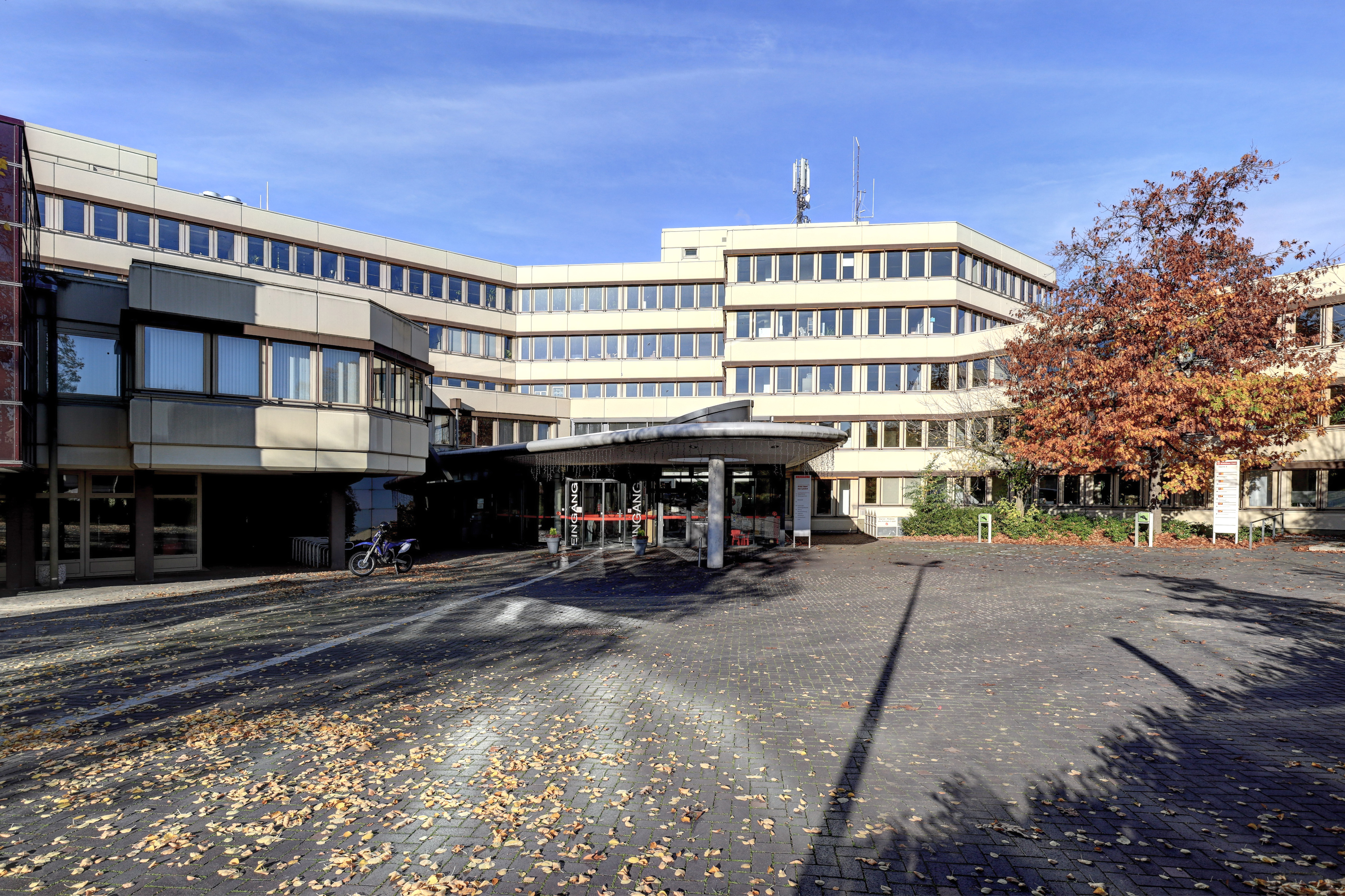
- Kreishaus (District office)

- Flag Coat of arms
- Coordinates: 52°00′N 8°55′E
- Country: Germany
- State: North Rhine-Westphalia
- Adm. region: Detmold
- Capital: Detmold

Government
  - District admin.: Axel Lehmann (SPD)

Area
  - Total: 1,246.4 km^{2} (481.2 sq mi)

Population (31 December 2025)
  - Total: 346,212
  - Density: 277.77/km^{2} (719.42/sq mi)
- Time zone: UTC+01:00 (CET)
  - Summer (DST): UTC+02:00 (CEST)
- Vehicle registration: LIP
- Website: www.lippe.de

Lippe (German pronunciation: [ˈlɪpə]) is a Kreis (district) in the east of North Rhine-Westphalia, Germany. Neighboring districts are Herford, Minden-Lübbecke, Höxter, Paderborn, Gütersloh, and district-free Bielefeld, which forms the region Ostwestfalen-Lippe.

The district of Lippe is named after the Lords of Lippe, who originally lived on the river Lippe and founded Lippstadt there, and their Principality of Lippe. It was a state within the Holy Roman Empire and retained statehood until 1947, when it became a district of North Rhine-Westphalia.

== History ==
The Lippe district nearly covers the same area as the historic County of Lippe. The first mention of this country was in 1123; it grew in power slowly in the following centuries. In 1528 it became a county, in 1789 it was elevated to a principality.

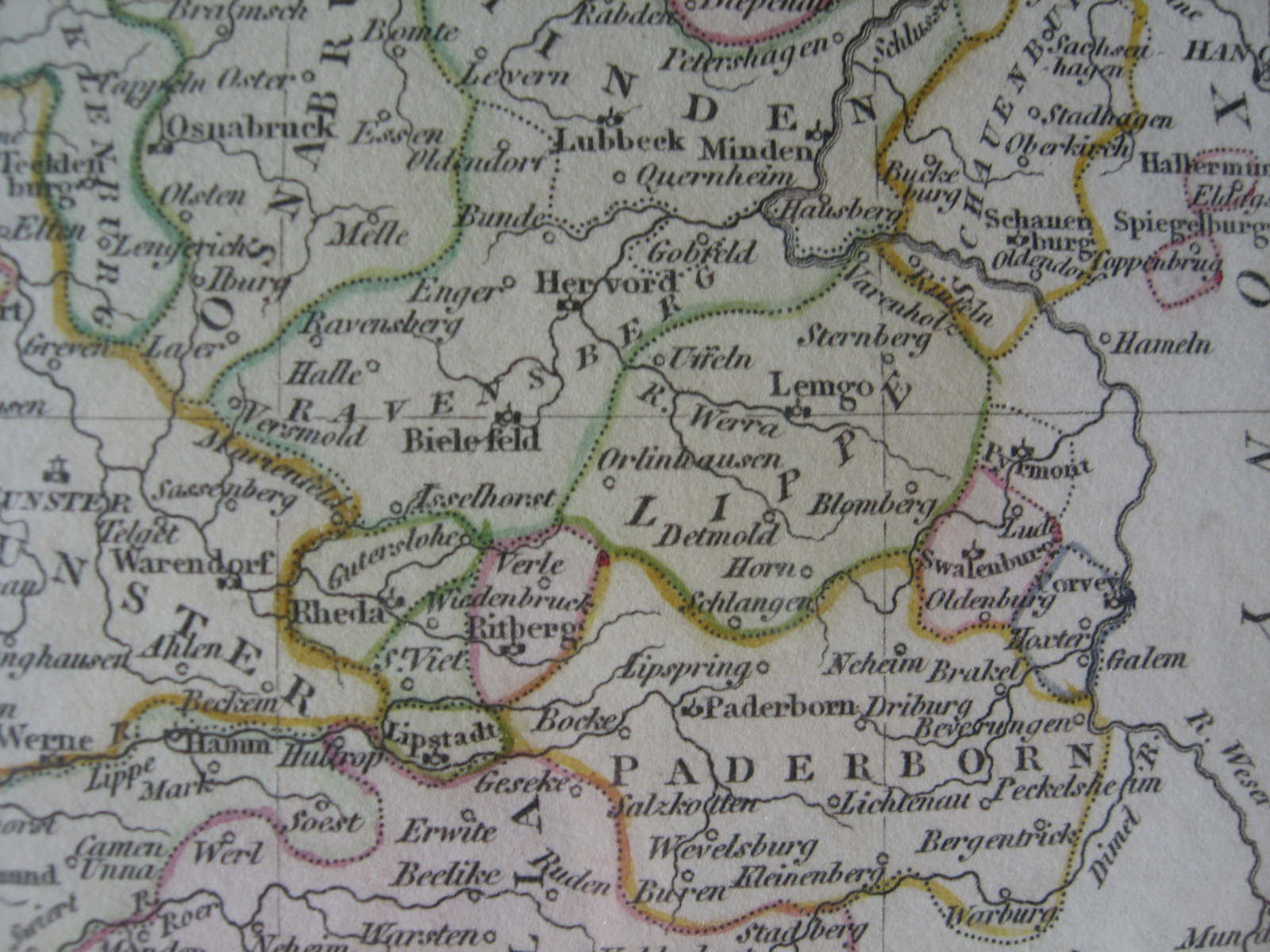
County of Lippe, 18th century

Unlike many other countries of the Holy Roman Empire in the area, Lippe kept its independence in the Napoleonic era, and thus wasn't incorporated into Prussia afterwards. It was one of the smaller member states of the German empire.

After the death of Prince Woldemar in 1895, the two lines of the House of Lippe fought over the regency for over a decade.

The last prince of Lippe was forced to abdicate during the November Revolution of 1918 following the Collapse of the Imperial German Army, whilst Germany as a whole became the Weimar Republic. The district became a Freistaat one of the constituent parts of the new republic. In 1932 the Free State of Lippe was subdivided into two districts, Detmold and Lemgo. These continued to exist when in 1947 Lippe lost its status as a state of Germany and by order of the British military government was incorporated into the new federal state North Rhine-Westphalia; in 1949 this change was approved by the parliament. In 1969/70 the 168 cities and municipalities were merged to 16; and as the second part of the administrative reform in 1973 the two districts Lemgo and Detmold were merged to the district Lippe.

== Geography ==
The Lippe district covers the northern part of the Teutoburg Forest, which also contain the highest elevation of the district, the 496 meter high Köterberg near Lügde. The lowest elevation is at the Weser river with 45.5 m. The main river is the Werre, and at the northern border of the district the Weser. The Lippe River, which shares the district's name, does not flow through Lippe, but has its headwaters right across the district line in Bad Lippspringe, Kreis Paderborn. The small territories of Lippstadt, Lipperode, and Cappel that belonged to Lippe until the mid 19th century, do lie in the valley of the river.

== Coat of arms ==
The coat of arms shows the traditional symbol of the state of Lippe, the rose, as the district covers nearly the same area as the historic country. In the middle of the rose 16 stamens symbolize the 16 cities and municipalities of the district. The coat of arms was granted in 1973.

Despite the relatively small size of Lippe, the Lippish rose is also one of only three symbols included in the coat of arms of the state of North Rhine-Westphalia.

== Towns and municipalities ==
Clickable map of towns and municipalities in the district

Towns
1. Bad Salzuflen
2. Barntrup
3. Blomberg
4. Detmold
5. Horn-Bad Meinberg
6. Lage
7. Lemgo
8. Lügde
9. Oerlinghausen
10. Schieder-Schwalenberg
Municipalities
1. Augustdorf
2. Dörentrup
3. Extertal
4. Kalletal
5. Leopoldshöhe
6. Schlangen

== Culinary art ==
The most famous dish served in Lippe is the pickert. In the past it was known as a meal for poor people. The main ingredients are potatoes, flour and raisins.
