= Otto, Count of Lippe-Brake =

First Count of Lippe-Brake

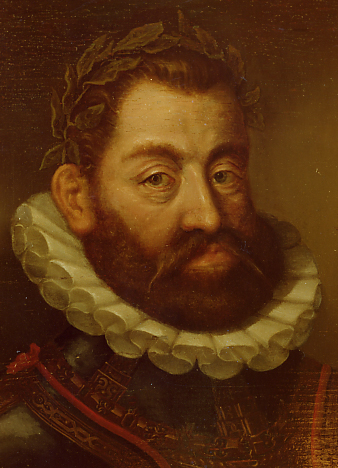
- Born: 21 December 1589
- Died: 18 November 1657 (aged 67); Blomberg
- Noble family: Lippe-Brake
- Spouse: Margaret of Nassau-Dillenburg
- Father: Simon VI, Count of Lippe
- Mother: Elisabeth of Holstein-Schaumburg

Otto, Count of Lippe-Brake (21 December 1589 – 18 November 1657 in Blomberg) was the first ruling Count of Lippe-Brake.

== Life ==
Otto was born on 21 December 1589 as the son of Count Simon VI and his wife, Countess Elisabeth of Holstein-Schaumburg (b. 1556) was born.

When his father died in 1613, his elder brother Simon VII took up government of the country, while the youngest brother Philip I moved to Bückeburg, where he later founded the Schaumburg-Lippe line. In 1621, the county was divided again, and Otto received his own part and founded the Lippe-Brake line, which would die out in 1709.

Otto died on 18 November 1657 in Blomberg.

== Marriage and issue ==
On 30 October 1626, he married Margarethe of Nassau-Dillenburg (6 September 1606 in Beilstein – 1661), a daughter of Count George of Nassau-Dillenburg and Countess Amalia of Sayn-Wittgenstein, with whom he had the following children:

- Casimir (1627-1700), married in 1663 with Countess Amalie of Sayn-Wittgenstein-Homburg (1642-1683)
- Amalia (20 September 1629 – 19 August 1676), married to Count Herman Adolph of Lippe-Detmold (1616-1666)
- Sabine (1631-1684)
- Dorothea (23 February 1633 – 1706), married in 1665) with Johann, Count of Kunowitz (1624-1700)
- William (1634-1690), married in 1667 with Countess Ludowika Margaret of Bentheim-Tecklenburg
- Maurice (1635-1666)
- Frederick (1638-1684), married in 1674 with Sophie Louise of Schleswig-Holstein-Sonderburg-Beck (1650-1714)
- Otillie (1639-1680), married in 1667 with Frederick, Duke of Löwenstein-Wertheim-Virneburg (1629-1683)
- George (1642-1703), married in 1691 with Marie Sauermann (d. 1696)
- Augustus (1643-1701)

Otto, Count of Lippe-Brake House of Lippe Born: 21 December 1589 Died: 18 November 1657
Preceded by Simon VI as Count of Lippe	Count of Lippe-Brake; 1621-1657	Succeeded by Casimir
