= Blomberg, North Rhine-Westphalia =

Blomberg
- Town
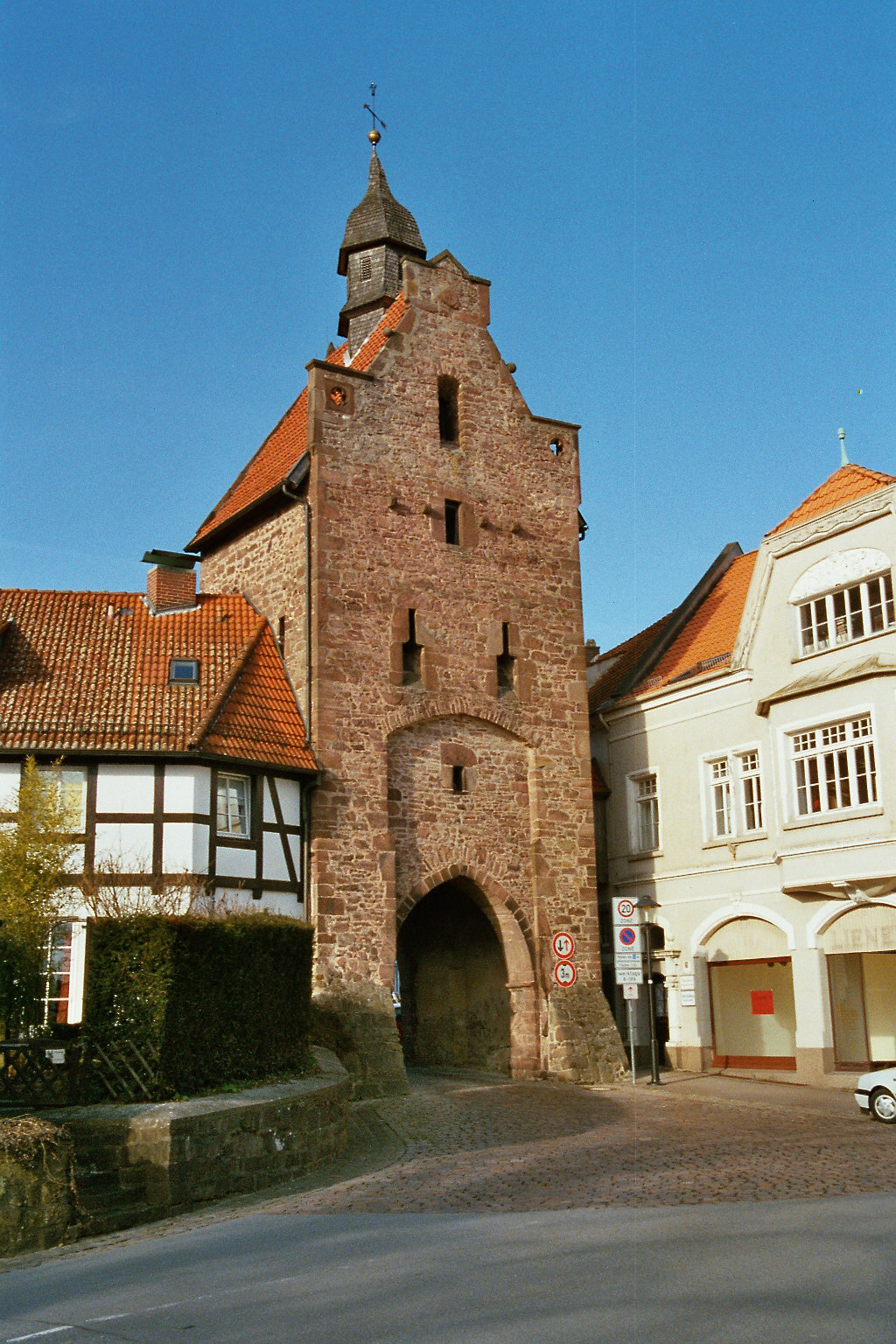
- Niederntor, 15th-century tower in Blomberg.

- Coat of arms

- Location of Blomberg within Lippe district
- Interactive map of Blomberg
- Location within Germany Location within North Rhine-Westphalia
- Coordinates: 51°56′N 09°05′E
- Country: Germany
- State: North Rhine-Westphalia
- Admin. region: Detmold
- District: Lippe
- Subdivisions: 19

Government
  - Mayor (2025–30): Christoph Dolle (SPD)

Area
  - Total: 99.1 km^{2} (38.3 sq mi)
- Elevation: 185 m (607 ft)

Population (2025-12-31)
  - Total: 15,367
  - Density: 155/km^{2} (402/sq mi)
- Time zone: UTC+01:00 (CET)
  - Summer (DST): UTC+02:00 (CEST)
- Postal codes: 32825
- Dialling codes: 05235, 05236
- Vehicle registration: LIP
- Website: www.blomberg-lippe.net

Blomberg (German pronunciation: [ˈblɔmbɛʁk]) is a town in the Lippe district of North Rhine-Westphalia, Germany, with c. 15,100 inhabitants (2019).

== History ==
=== City founding and life in the late Middle Ages ===
Today's urban area was settled between the 6th and 8th centuries AD during the course of the old Saxon expansion. During this time, the region's villages ending in -trup emerged, such as Herrentrup, Istrup, Wellentrup, Brüntrup, Tintrup and Höntrup. The term -trup means -dorf (cf thorp) and was formed through metathesis over time.

In the 11th century, the population grew significantly. Up until then, the farmers had worked with primitive agricultural methods that did not allow profitable cultivation of the soil. This situation changed with the introduction of the iron wheeled plough, the three-field system and the water mill in the High Middle Ages and led to more productive harvests that improved the food situation. This also made the Lippe region interesting for the ruling class. The new rulers were the Lords of Lippe and the Counts of Schwalenberg and Stambuberg. It is believed that both shared Blomberg Castle, which initially only served as a fortress.

Between 1231 and 1255 Blomberg was founded as a city by Bernhard III. The documents about it were lost in the course of the Soest feud, so that there is no exact date. However, there is a document from the year 1283, which shows that the city rights had existed "for a long time" at that time. Blomberg was apparently of particular importance to the Lippe sovereigns because the town was located at the crossroads of three important medieval trade routes. These long-distance routes were the Cologne Road, which led to Hameln via Soest, Horn and Blomberg, and the Frankfurt Road, which led via Kassel, Warburg, Steinheim, Blomberg and Rinteln to Bremen and finally the road from Osnabrück via Herford, Lemgo, Blomberg, Höxter and on to Thuringia. In the extensive forests, gangs of robbers also threatened the traffic of the time and the roads in the Blomberg area were secured by six watchtowers.

The city was built according to the traditional three-street system, in which three parallel longitudinal streets meet at the ends in front of a city gate. The area of the approximately 11.3 hectare city was planned for 1,600 inhabitants and only expanded after 1860, i.e. almost 600 years later, beyond its border to the east. Simon I (1275–1344) chose Blomberg as his residence and had the castle expanded as a residence. He and his successors frequently moved between their homes in Blomberg and Brake. The town and castle were fortified all around, and the castle was additionally secured by a rampart and moat. Steep slopes offered natural protection to the west and south, while to the east and north the city was surrounded by walls, moats, ramparts, and even thorn hedges. In addition, there were six defensive towers as well as Zwinger and Landwehr in front of the gates. The Lower Gate and parts of the city wall of the city fortifications are still preserved today.

In Blomberg there was a certain division into upper and lower town, mostly the craftsmen lived upstairs and the farmers downstairs. Upper and lower town had separate dogs and even the municipal inns were distributed in exact numbers between upper and lower town. Children from the upper town were taught by the cantor and those from the lower town by the sexton. As everywhere in the cities, Blomberg's economy was determined by the guild system. Almost all handicraft businesses in the Blomberg Basin were concentrated in the city, only millers, blacksmiths, wheel makers, cobblers and patch cutters could also settle in the countryside.

=== Destruction, reconstruction and reformation ===
Blomberg's fortifications did not protect the city from total destruction in the course of the Soest feud. In 1447, the Archbishop of Cologne besieged the city and on June 14 had his mercenaries almost completely burn it to the ground.

The city was rebuilt from 1468 with the support of Bernhard VII. A momentous event took place during this time. A woman named Alheyd Pustekoke stole 45 consecrated wafers from the Martini church. Fearing discovery, she threw them into the well in the Seligen Winkel. But the hosts did not sink, Alheyd was convicted of theft and burned at the stake as punishment. Soon after, word spread that the fountain had miraculous healing powers and Blomberg became a place of pilgrimage. News of this even reached the Vatican so the cardinals in Rome encouraged the building of a chapel over the fountain. 1468 got the Augustinian canons in the Möllenbeck monastery gave this church and at the same time received permission to build a monastery. The church was expanded into a late Gothic hall church in 1473 and is today the Protestant-Reformed town parish church. The donations were so substantial that a monastery church could be built, which for almost 200 years served as the burial place of Lippe's noble lords and counts. It has not been historically clarified whether the trial against Alheyd Pustekoke is to be classified as a "witch trial".

At a total of five state parliaments in Cappel, the towns and knights decided in 1538 to introduce a Protestant church order for Lippe and Blomberg converted to the Evangelical Lutheran faith. The fountain lost its supra-local importance and fell into oblivion. The second Reformation took place in 1605. Sovereign Count Simon VI ordered the evangelical-reformed confession of John Calvin to be introduced in all towns and communities in the County of Lippe. Only Lemgo successfully resisted, while Blomberg reluctantly submitted.

=== Thirty Years' War and economic development ===
During the Thirty Years' War (1618-1648), Blomberg was again severely damaged when enemy troops plundered the city in August 1636. In the course of the war, the Blomberg citizens were hit by a devastating plague epidemic and the population fell from 1640 to 675 people within a short time. The city only slowly recovered from the horrors of war and it was not until 1834 that its former population was reached again.

In 1589 three women from Donop and Kleinenmarpe were accused and executed in a witch trial in Blomberg. In Wellentrup, between 1589 and 1674, three men and two women were involved in witch trials. On March 10, 2015, the City Council of Blomberg rehabilitated the victims of the witch trials from a socio-ethical and moral point of view.

A few merchants settled on Blomberg's main streets, the Langen and Kurzen Steinwegs, some of whose stately hall houses from the 16th and 17th centuries have survived to this day. According to the Lippe census of 1776, there was a diverse craft and commercial structure in Blomberg. These included 84 shoemakers, 30 harness makers, 30 farmers and carters, 15 carpenters, 13 bakers, 10 scribes, 8 linen weavers, 7 locksmiths, 6 blacksmiths, 3 innkeepers, 3 hat makers, 3 glaziers, 3 butchers, 3 bathers and surgeons, 3 traders, 3 masons, 2 apothecaries, 2 wheel makers and 2 carpenters.

The shoemaking trade developed in the 18th century. Even today, the cobbler's lantern is the symbol of Blomberg's craftsmanship. At times more than 100 shoemakers worked in the city and sent their products to Kassel, Osnabrück, Hanover and Braunschweig.

=== Industrialization ===
At the beginning of the 19th century, the timber industry became the economic focus. In 1805 already 5000 chairs were manufactured and sold on foreign markets. The Krone chair factory was founded in 1880 and in 1893 Bernd Hausmann set up the first plywood factory in Germany. At the beginning of the 19th century, Friedrich Vöchting and Carl Gronemann began cultivating carnations on the former dairy site. Eventually, there were over 1500 varieties of carnation exported around the world up until the First World War. This gave Blomberg the nickname Carnation City.

In the years 1835 to 1895 Blomberg's population grew from 2141 to 3084 people. Especially in the last decade of the 19th century, there was an economic upswing when Blomberg was connected to the railway network. A branch line was opened in 1897, connecting the city to the Altenbeken–Hannover railway line. Despite the first signs of industrial development, agriculture remained an important economic factor, although often as a sideline. As late as the mid-1920s, 700 of the 1,000 resident households were still cultivating up to two hectares of field or garden. [18]

=== World War I and the Weimar Republic ===
During the First World War (1914-1918), 180 Blombergers were killed or have been missing since then. After the end of the war, Kaiser Wilhelm II abdicated and Philipp Scheidemann proclaimed the republic on November 9, 1918. A day later, the Lippe People's and Soldiers' Council was constituted in Detmold and formed the new Lippe government. Just two days later, the People's Council of the City of Blomberg was founded in Blomberg, which was made up of workers and soldiers. Gatherings on the streets were banned, children were no longer allowed to be outside after dark and young people after 9 p.m. After this proclamation, the red flag of the revolution was hoisted at City Hall. According to recent historical research, the majority of the workers' and soldiers' councils did not belong to the extreme left, but to the MSPD and the moderate members of the USPD. At the Berlin Reich Council Congress at the end of 1918, a clear majority of the delegates decided against a council republic and in favor of the earliest possible elections to the National Assembly, after which the SPD formed the first government of the Weimar Republic. Prince Leopold IV of Lippe-Biesterfeld abdicated in Lippe and the Principality of Lippe became a free state within the German Empire.

In March 1920, as a reaction to the Kapp Putsch, there was a general strike in which 650 Blomberg workers from 25 companies took part. In the last years of the Weimar Republic, there were violent clashes between supporters of the KPD and NSDAP in Lippe, as in the entire Reich, some of which degenerated into hall battles and shootings. [18]

=== Nazism and World War II ===
On January 15, 1933, state elections were held in Lippe. In the Reichstag elections in November 1932, the NSDAP had to accept a decline in their share of the vote from 41.13% to 34.72%. That is why the Nazis tried to win the state elections in Lippe at all costs. The entire leadership of the NSDAP was involved in the election campaign and in the final phase of the election campaign Hitler alone spoke in Lippe sixteen times within ten days. On January 13, Hitler and Frick addressed 5,000 people in Blomberg. In the election, the NSDAP was able to increase by almost 10% and achieved 43.4% of the votes, while the SPD took only 26.6% and the KPD 15.9% of the votes. The NSDAP declared the election victory in Lippe as Hitler's breakthrough on his way to the Reich Chancellery, but in fact the decision was made in Berlin, when Reich President Hindenburg gave in to the pressure of the conservatives and appointed Hitler Reich Chancellor. After that, the Nazis immediately expanded their power and suspended elementary basic rights. As part of the so-called “Gleichschaltung” the other political parties, trade unions and many associations were banned and most of the leading positions in politics, administration and all of public life were occupied by the NSDAP. Anyone who did not fit into the "national community" was persecuted and imprisoned.

On March 6, 1933, the first functionaries and members of the KPD in Blomberg were taken into so-called protective custody. Thereafter, 14 house searches were carried out on members of the SPD. The increasing reprisals by the SA and the police led to resignations in many parts of the SPD. On April 1, 1933, the Blomberg SPD local association dissolved. One victim of the Nazis was the upholsterer Wilhelm Friedrichs, who wrote a number of letters critical of the regime to Nazi functionaries in Blomberg and Detmold. He was arrested and taken to a prison in Hanover, where he hanged himself the day before the court hearing. [18] It is known from Jewish citizens of Blomberg that the Königsheim family went to Argentina under pressure from the Nazis emigrated. The last Jewish resident of Blomberg was 70-year-old Emma Lippert, née Examus, who was deported to the Theresienstadt concentration camp and on to Minsk, where she was murdered. Since then there has been no Jewish community in Blomberg. The simple half-timbered synagogue from 1808 is now used as the city archive.

The cityscape of Blomberg survived the Second World War largely unscathed. At the beginning of April 1945, the Americans crossed the Teutoburg Forest and reached Detmold. Further east, in the area to the right of Reichsstrasse 1, the US 83rd Infantry Division operated and pushed northeast through Blomberg. US soldiers cleared the anti-tank barriers at the dairy and did not encounter any significant resistance since the SS units had left the city earlier. Blomberg was handed over by the mayor on April 5, 1945 and occupied by the Americans without a fight while their tanks continued to Hagen and Lügde. During World War II, 205 Blombergers were killed and 105 are missing.

=== Post-war and present ===
From 1945 to 1952, Blomberg had to take in a total of 1,500 displaced persons from the Baltic States. In 1957, the Phoenix Contact company set up its headquarters in Blomberg. From 1962 to 1996, a Dutch unit of 1,600 soldiers and their family members were stationed on behalf of NATO in the so-called Nederlandspark in the south of the Blomberg industrial area. They formed a not inconsiderable economic factor for the city. In 1970 this was done by the Bielefeld Lawthe municipal reorganization, in the course of which a total of 17 previously independent municipalities were assigned as districts to the core city of Blomberg. The number of inhabitants has almost doubled and grew from 7761 to 15,299 people. The core town is not only the administrative centre for Blomberg, but also serves as a medium-sized centre for an area with up to 60,000 inhabitants. In 1973, planning began for a comprehensive redevelopment of the historic city centre. The official completion of the work was the unveiling of the Alheyd fountain on the market square in 1989.

On March 7, 2005, French President Jacques Chirac and Federal Chancellor Schröder met in the Burghotel Blomberg. In 2008 Blomberg celebrated the 725th anniversary of the founding of the city with many activities and events as well as a city festival from August 15 to 17.

== Politics ==
The current mayor of Blomberg is Christoph Dolle of the SPD who has been serving as mayor since 2020. In the 2025 local elections he was reelected with 67.2% of the vote.

=== City council ===
After the 2025 local elections, the Blomberg city council is composed as follows:

Party	Votes	%	+/-	Seats	+/-
Social Democratic Party (SPD)	3,614	46.7	▲3.8	15	▲1
Christian Democratic Union (CDU)	1,993	25.7	▼5.3	8	▼2
Alternative for Germany (AfD)	1,266	16.3	New	5	New
Alliance 90/The Greens (Grüne)	874	11.3	▼7.6	4	▼2
Valid votes	7,747	98.4			
Invalid votes	129	1.6			
Total	7,876	100.0		32	±0
Electorate/voter turnout	12,390	63.6			
Source: City of Blomberg

== Geography ==
Blomberg is 45 km south east of Bielefeld, 20 km east of Detmold and 17 km south west towards Bad Pyrmont. The district is located in the southern foothills of the Lippe mountain range and in the area of Blomberger and Schwalenberger Heights.

The core city is located in the center of the so-called Blomberger basin, which lies about 150 m above sea level and clearly separates itself from the surrounding area. The hem of the basin to the north and east are the approximately 400 m high wooded ridges of Barntruper and Blomberger Stadtwald with the Dicker, Becker and Winterberg. To the west are the Hörntruper Berg, the Meierberg, the Mossenberg (228 m) and the Püllenberg (261 m), while the border in the south of Nessenberg (235 m), Spielberg (239 m) and Steinberg (342 m) is formed. The drainage of the eastern part of the Blomberger basin is made by the Diestel, a left tributary of the Emmer. Between the districts Istrup and Großenmarpe a watershed has formed. For this reason, the western part of the Blomberg basin is drained via the Marpe and its tributaries towards Bega / Werre. The lowest point of the municipality is at 139 m, the highest is the summit of the winter mountain at 429 m.

== Geology ==
The municipality is located on the southern flank of the Pyrmont-Piesberger axis, there are almost exclusively rocks of the Middle (Km) and Upper Keupers (Ko) open-minded. The rock strata, which were once stored horizontally in the Middle Ages, were raised in the Tertiary around 30 million years ago and formed the Blomberger Sattel.

By erosion in the center of the saddle the older gray and red marl of the Middle Keuper (Km1) were uncovered, which is also called Gipskeuper because of switched-on layers of gypsum. The result was the clearly recognizable pelvic structure, this phenomenon is called relief reversal. The reed sandstone (Km2) then forms a first striking terrain level. The city itself is located on the western edge of this steep step. The reed sandstone was obtained in small quarries as quarry stone for construction purposes. The marls of the so-called Red Wall (Km3) are susceptible to weathering, only the following harder stone marls (Km4) give rise to another stage in the terrain. The outermost edge of the basin structure consists of harder rock layers of the Upper Keuper (Ko) Rätkeuper.

In the Tertiary it came in the inner basin edges consisting of gypsum Keuper to the dissolution of plaster layers. Through this process, also called subrosion, formed hollows. These were backfilled with the weathering marl from the immediate area. Because of their high clay content, these sediments formed the raw material basis for some brickworks. In the basin itself, loess has deposited in the course of the last ice age and weathered to loess clay. The amount of deposits is up to 150 cm and is responsible for the good to very good quality of arable land.

The old Kleinstadt, classified district, covers an area of 99.12 km^{2}. The municipality has a maximum extent in east-west direction of about 12.5 km and in north-south direction of about 15.5 km.

The vast majority of the land is used by agriculture, in the area of wet creek lowlands mainly as grassland and pastures. The forest on the surrounding mountains consists of three quarters of deciduous trees, mostly beech, while on the Rätkeuper spruce cultures thrive. In comparison to the NRW state average of 49.4%, the agricultural area in Blomberg is 60%, while the forest area is 25.4% (NRW) and 26.5% (Blomberg).

Extensive areas of the Blomberg urban area are good to very good for the use of geothermal heat sources using geothermal probes and heat generated by heat pump. In the central and southern urban area, however, the suitability is rather mediocre, and in some cases poor (see the adjacent map).

== Neighbouring communities ==
The neighbouring communities are Bad Pyrmont, (in Landkreis Hameln-Pyrmont, Niedersachsen), Lügde, Schieder-Schwalenberg, Horn-Bad Meinberg, Detmold, Lemgo, Dörentrup and Barntrup (all in Kreis Lippe).

== Villages ==
Village	Area (km²)	Population: 31. December 2015	Mayor: 01. March 2021	Villages of Blomberg
Altendonop	4,28	240	Paulo Cameli	Villages of Blomberg
Blomberg	20,16	8161	Nord: Rolf Schlüter; Süd: Dieter Rieke	Villages of Blomberg
Borkhausen	2,79	45	Jörg Berten	Villages of Blomberg
Brüntrup	4,60	489	Heike Niedermeier	Villages of Blomberg
Cappel	2,81	561	Dietmar Albrecht	Villages of Blomberg
Dalborn	2,84	84	Stefanie Beermann	Villages of Blomberg
Donop	5,26	508	Lothar Vogt	Villages of Blomberg
Eschenbruch	7,55	430	Nicole Kästing	Villages of Blomberg
Großenmarpe	9,14	1170	Peter Siegmann	Villages of Blomberg
Herrentrup	3,83	473	Reinhard Heilig	Villages of Blomberg
Höntrup	2,30	237	Ernst-Wilhelm Beckmeier	Villages of Blomberg
Istrup	10,54	1459	Jürgen Berghahn	Villages of Blomberg
Kleinenmarpe	3,44	149	Frank Wilde	Villages of Blomberg
Maspe	2,09	224	Jörg Berten	Villages of Blomberg
Mossenberg-Wöhren	3,44	254	Wilhelm Schnittcher	Villages of Blomberg
Reelkirchen	4,00	733	Claudia Cruts	Villages of Blomberg
Siebenhöfen	3,62	72	Jörg Berten	Villages of Blomberg
Tintrup	2,91	325	Thomas Spieker	Villages of Blomberg
Wellentrup	3,62	225	Hagen Stiewe	Villages of Blomberg

The Blomberg city area belongs to the maritime climate area of northwest Germany. The winters are usually mild under Atlantic influence, the summers moderately warm and the rainfall relatively evenly distributed. The average annual temperature is around 9 °C. Monthly average varies from around 0 °C in January to 17 °C in July / August. The annual rainfall is around 900 mm. The average annual solar radiation is 955 kilowatt hours per square meter.

== Population ==
Historical population

Year	Pop.	±% p.a.
1965	14,360	—
1970	14,630	+0.37%
1975	14,502	−0.18%
1980	14,777	+0.38%
1985	14,950	+0.23%
1990	15,158	+0.28%
1995	16,786	+2.06%

Year	Pop.	±% p.a.
2000	17,622	+0.98%
2005	17,043	−0.67%
2010	16,171	−1.04%
2015	15,370	−1.01%
2020	15,093	−0.36%
2025	15,367	+0.36%

Source: Landesdatabank Nordrhein-Westfalen

== Notable residents ==
- Wilfried Paulsen (1828–1901) was born on Gut Nassengrund near Blomberg. He was a potato breeder and in the last decades of the 19th century he was the market leader for potatoes in Germany
- Louis Paulsen (1833–1891), the younger brother of Wilfried, was one of the strongest German chess players of the 19th century
- Hermann Vöchting (1847–1917) was a well-known botanist and longtime director of the Botanical Institute of University of Tübingen.
- Gerhard Schröder, born 1944 in the Blomberg village Mossenberg-Wöhren, is a German politician (SPD). He was the seventh Federal Chancellor of the Federal Republic of Germany from 1998 to 2005, and from 1990 to 1998 Minister President of Lower Saxony.
- Karl Bömers (1848–1888) was a lawyer and writer
