= Landgravine Sophie of Hesse-Kassel =

Sophie of Hesse-Kassel
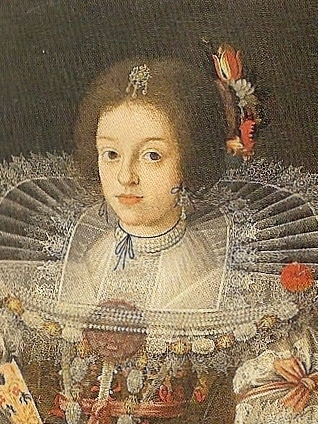
- Sophie of Hesse-Kassel
- Born: 12 September 1615; Kassel
- Died: 22 November 1670 (aged 55); Bückeburg
- Noble family: House of Hesse-Kassel
- Spouse: Philip I, Count of Schaumburg-Lippe (m. 1640)
- Father: Maurice, Landgrave of Hesse-Kassel
- Mother: Juliana of Nassau-Siegen

Sophie of Hesse-Kassel (12 September 1615 – 22 November 1670) was a princess of Hesse-Kassel by birth and by marriage Countess of Schaumburg-Lippe.

== Life ==
Sophie was a daughter of Count Maurice of Hesse-Kassel (1572–1632) from his marriage to Juliane (1587–1643), daughter of Count John VII of Nassau-Siegen.

She married on 12 October 1640 in Hagen Count Philip I of Schaumburg-Lippe (1601–1681). Through his marriage Philip secured the renewed investiture of the districts Rodenberg, Hagenburg and Arensburg, which was conditional on his county being under the auspices of Landgravine Elisabeth Amalie of Hesse-Kassel.

== Descendants ==
From her marriage with Philip, Sophie had the following children:

- Elizabeth (1646–1646)
- Sophie Eleonore (1648–1671)
- Johanna Dorothea (1649–1695)

married in 1664 (divorced in 1678) Count John Adolph of Bentheim-Tecklenburg (1637–1704)

- Hedwig Louise (1650–1731)

married in 1676 Duke August of Schleswig-Holstein-Sonderburg-Beck (1652–1689)

- Bernard William (1651–1651)
- Philippine Elisabeth (1652–1703)

married in 1676, Count Philipp Christoph of Breunner to Asparn (d. 1708)

- Frederick Christian (1655–1728), Count of Schaumburg-Lippe

married firstly in 1691 (divorced in 1725) Countess Johanna Sophie of Hohenlohe-Langenburg (1673–1743)
married secondly in 1725 Anna Maria von Gall (1707–1760)

- Charles Herman (1656–1657)
- Charlotte Juliane (1657–1684)

married in 1676 Count John Heinrich of Kuefstein (1643–1687)

- Philip Ernest (1659–1723), Count of Lippe-Alverdissen

married in 1686 princess Dorothea Amalie of Schleswig-Holstein-Sonderburg-Beck (1656–1739), daughter of August Philipp, Duke of Schleswig-Holstein-Sonderburg-Beck

== References and sources ==
- Franz Carl Theodor Piderit: Geschichte der Grafschaft Schaumburg und der wichtigsten Orte in derselben, p. 141

Landgravine Sophie of Hesse-Kassel House of Hesse-Kassel Born: 12 September 1615 Died: 22 November 1670
New title	Countess consort of Schaumburg-Lippe; 1644-1670	Succeeded by Johanna Sophia of Hohenlohe-Langenburg
