= Philip I of Schaumburg-Lippe =

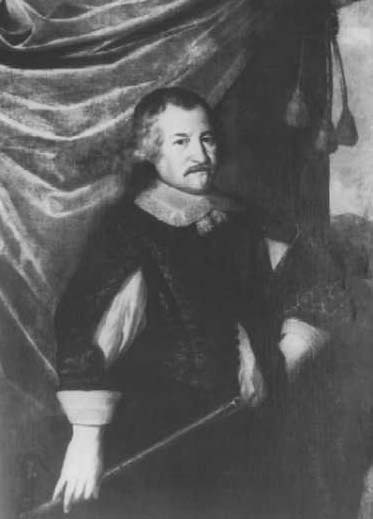
Philipp I, Count of Schaumburg-Lippe

Philipp I, Count of Schaumburg-Lippe (18 July 1601 – 10 April 1681) was the founder of the Schaumburg-Lippe line.

He was born in Lemgo the son of Simon VI, Count of Lippe (1555–1613) and his second wife Countess Elisabeth of Holstein-Schaumburg (1566–1638).

Following the death of his father in 1613, he inherited Lippe-Alverdissen, which he ruled until the creation of Schaumburg-Lippe in 1640.

Schaumburg-Lippe was founded after the Thirty Years' War, when Otto V, Count of Schaumburg died without children. Following his death the County of Schaumburg went to his mother, Countess Elisabeth of Lippe as the legal heir. In 1640 she transferred her rights to her brother Philipp, who then became the first Count of Schaumburg-Lippe. He reigned as count until his death, when he was succeeded by his son Friedrich Christian. His second son Philipp Ernest received Lippe-Alverdissen.

== Marriage and children ==
He was married on 13 October 1644 at Stadthagen to Landgravine Sophie of Hesse-Kassel (or Hesse-Cassel) (1615–1670), they had ten children.

- Countess Elisabeth (1646–1646)
- Countess Sophie (1648–1671)
- Countess Johanna Dorothea (1649–1696)
- Countess Luise (1650–1731)
- Count Wilhelm Bernard (1651–1651)
- Countess Elisabeth Philippine (1652–1703)
- Count Frederick Christian (1655–1728)
- Count Karl Hermann (1656–1657)
- Countess Charlotte Juliana (1658–1684)
- Count Philip Ernest (1659–1753) founder of the Schaumburg-Lippe-Alverdissen line
  - Friedrich Ernest, Count of Lippe-Alverdissen (1694-1749)
    - Philip II, Count of Schaumburg-Lippe (1723-1787)

Philip I of Schaumburg-Lippe House of Lippe Born: 18 July 1601 Died: 10 April 1681
Regnal titles
| Preceded by Simon VI as Count of Lippe | Count of Lippe-Alverdissen; 1613–1640 | Vacant Title next held by Philipp Ernest |
| Preceded by Otto V as Count of Holstein-Schaumburg | Count of Schaumburg-Lippe; 1640–1681 | Succeeded by Friedrich Christian |
