= Lippe-Alverdissen =

Former monarchy in Europe

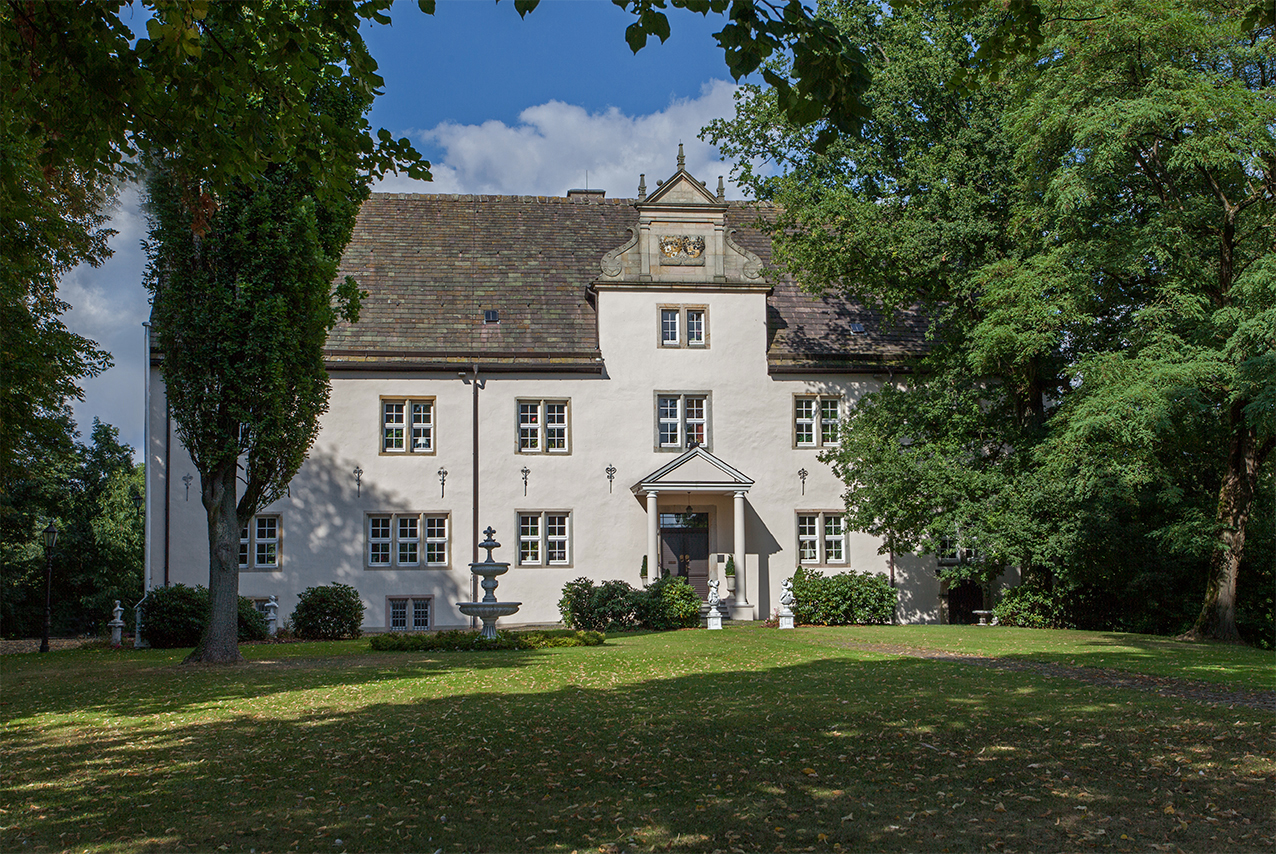
Alverdissen Castle, residence of the Lippe-Alverdissen line

Lippe-Alverdissen was a German county of the ruling House of Lippe.

The branch was created in 1613 following the death of Count Simon VI of Lippe, with his realm being split between his three sons with his youngest son Philipp receiving the estate of Alverdissen (near Barntrup).

Following Count Philipp's ascension as Count of Schaumburg-Lippe in 1643, Alverdissen became a property of the now ruling branch of Schaumburg-Lippe. Following the death of Count Philipp in 1681 Schaumburg-Lippe went to his eldest son Friedrich Christian who built the existing Renaissance castle at Alverdissen and later ceded it to his brother Philip Ernest who founded the Schaumburg-Lippe-Alverdissen line. The two lines remained separate until Philip II, Count of Schaumburg-Lippe, of the junior Schaumburg-Lippe-Alverdissen branch inherited the county of Schaumburg-Lippe in 1777. In 1812, Alverdissen Castle was sold by the princes of Schaumburg-Lippe to Pauline, the wife of Leopold I, Prince of Lippe.

== See also ==
- List of consorts of Lippe
