= Simon VI of Lippe =

Simon VI, Count of Lippe
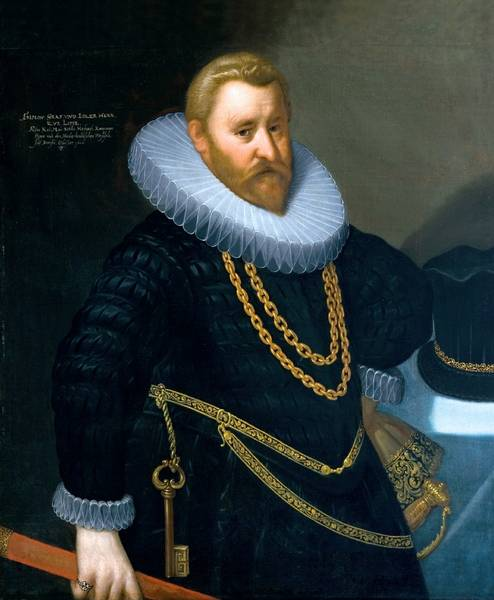
- Simon VI of Lippe
- Born: 15 April 1554; Detmold
- Died: 7 December 1613 (aged 59); Brake, now part of Lemgo
- Noble family: House of Lippe
- Spouses: Armgard, Countess of Rietberg; Elizabeth of Schaumburg and Holstein-Pinneberg
- Issue Detail: Simon VII; Otto; Philip I
- Father: Bernhard VIII, Count of Lippe
- Mother: Catherine of Waldeck-Eisenberg

Count Simon VI of Lippe (15 April 1554 in Detmold – 7 December 1613 in Brake (now part of Lemgo)) was an imperial count and ruler of the County of Lippe from 1563 until his death.

== Life ==
Simon was the son of Count Bernhard VIII of Lippe (1527–1563) and his wife Catherine (1524–1583), daughter of the Count Philip III of Waldeck-Eisenberg and Anna of Cleves. Since he was still a minor when his father died, his uncle Hermann Simon of Pyrmont took up the regency until 1579.

Simon was an intelligent prince, a man after the renaissance ideal. He corresponded with many leading scientists of his time, among them Tycho Brahe and Jost Bürgi. He acted as a counselor and chamberlain to the Holy Roman Emperor Rudolph II, for whom he undertook diplomatic missions, such as mediation in inheritance disputes between princes. He acted as an intermediary and an agent in the trade of Dutch paintings.

The castle at Brake had been pledged to Christoph von Donop from 1562 to 1570. In 1584–1589, Simon had it expanded in the style of the Weser Renaissance. He used it as his residence until his death. In September 1599 he suffered a severe defeat at the Siege of Rees by the Spaniards. From 1600, he employed the Dutch military architect Johan van Rijswijk. Under Simon VI, the county converted to Calvinism in 1605. Using his monarchic privilege of cuius regio, eius religio he prompted the conversion of the Church of Lippe to Calvinism. This led to a dispute with many of his subjects, especially the Free and Hanseatic City of Lemgo, which had been Lutheran since 1522. Lemgo defied the edict to convert to Calvinism, leading to the Revolt of Lemgo. This religious dispute was resolved by the Peace of Röhrentrup in 1617, granting Lemgo the right to determine its faith independently. The Lutheran minority only joined the else Reformed Church of Lippe again in 1882.

Simon owned an extensive library. It served as a court library as well as a collection of a professional politician and diplomat. It contained theological and historical works as well as philosophical and jurisprudential literature. It later became the basis for the Lippe State Library at Detmold, where the collection is still kept.

Simon died in 1613 and was succeeded by his eldest surviving son, Simon VII, who moved the seat of government back to Detmold. Simon VI's youngest son, Philip I later found the Schaumburg-Lippe line, whose seat of government was in Bückeburg.

== Marriage and issue ==
In 1578, Simon married Countess Armgard of Rietberg (died: 13 July 1584). This marriage remained childless.

In 1585, he married Elisabeth, a daughter of Count Otto IV of Schaumburg and Holstein-Pinneberg. They had the following children:

- Bernhard (1586–1602)
- Simon VII (1587–1627), first marriage in 1607, Anna Catherine of Nassau-Wiesbaden, second marriage in 1623, Maria Magdalene of Waldeck-Wildungen
- Otto (1589–1657), Count of Lippe-Brake, married Margaret of Nassau-Dillenburg (1606–1661)
- Herman van Lippe-Schwalenberg of Lippe-Schwalenberg
- Elisabeth (1592–1646), married 1612 Count George Hermann of Holstein-Schaumburg
- Catherine (1594–1600)
- Magdalena (1595–1640)
- Ursula (1598–1638), married in 1617 Prince John Louis of Nassau-Hadamar
- Sophie (1599–1653), married in 1626 Prince Louis of Anhalt-Köthen
- Philip I (1601–1681), Count of Schaumburg-Lippe, married Landgravine Sophie of Hesse-Kassel

== Footnotes ==
Simon VI of Lippe House of Lippe Born: 15 April 1554 Died: 7 December 1613
Preceded by Bernhard VIII	Count of Lippe; 1563–1613	Succeeded by Simon VII as Count of Lippe-Detmold
Preceded by Bernhard VIII	Count of Lippe; 1563–1613	Succeeded by Otto as Count of Lippe-Brake
Preceded by Bernhard VIII	Count of Lippe; 1563–1613	Succeeded by Philip I as Count of Lippe-Alverdissen, later Count of Schaumburg-Lippe
