= Schieder-Schwalenberg =

- Town
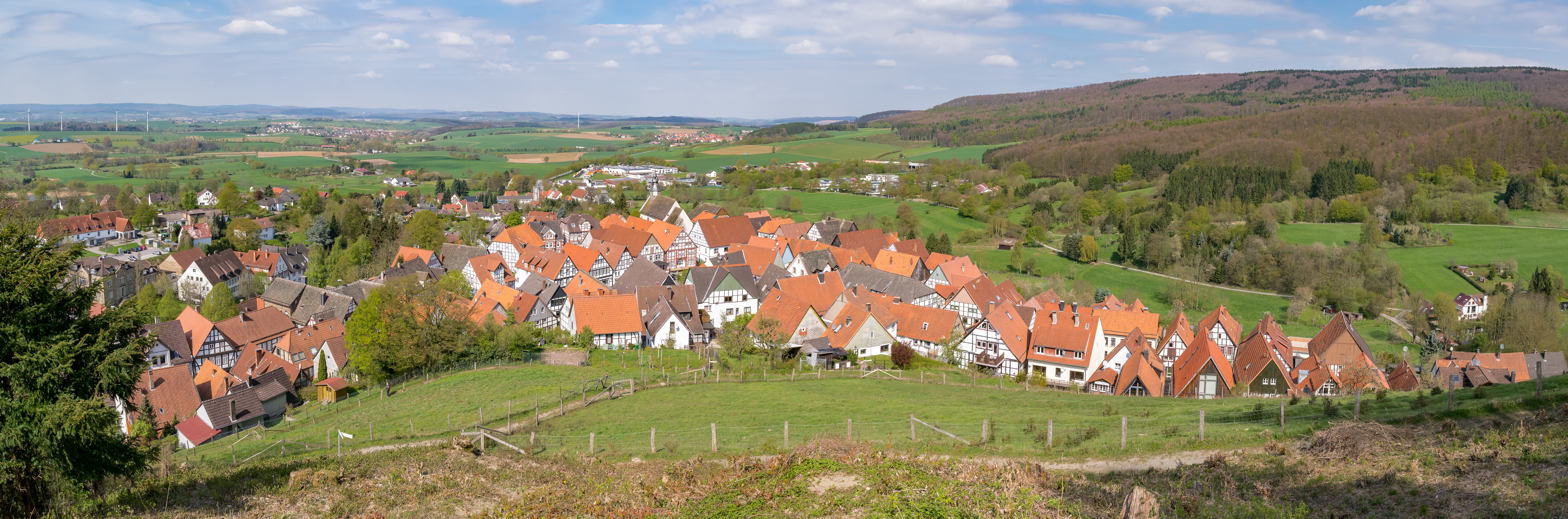

- Coat of arms

- Location of Schieder-Schwalenberg within Lippe district
- Interactive map of Schieder-Schwalenberg
- Location within Germany Location within North Rhine-Westphalia
- Coordinates: 51°53′N 09°11′E
- Country: Germany
- State: North Rhine-Westphalia
- Admin. region: Detmold
- District: Lippe
- Subdivisions: 9

Government
  - Mayor (2020–25): Jörg Bierwirth (Ind.)

Area
  - Total: 60.04 km^{2} (23.18 sq mi)
- Elevation: 213 m (699 ft)

Population (2025-12-31)
  - Total: 7,986
  - Density: 133.0/km^{2} (344.5/sq mi)
- Time zone: UTC+01:00 (CET)
  - Summer (DST): UTC+02:00 (CEST)
- Postal codes: 32816
- Dialling codes: 05282, 05284, 05233
- Vehicle registration: LIP
- Website: www.schieder-schwalenberg.de

Schieder-Schwalenberg (German pronunciation: [ˈʃiːdɐ ˈʃvaːlənˌbɛʁk]; Low German: Schüer-Schwalenberg) is a town in the Lippe district, in North Rhine-Westphalia, Germany. It is situated approximately 20 km (12 mi) east of Detmold.

It consists of 8 communes, which have been combined to a town in 1970. The names of the communes are Schieder, Brakelsiek, Schwalenberg, Lothe, Ruensiek, Wöbbel, Siekholz and Kreienberg, the district Schieder together with Glashütte is a Kneipp health resort. Together they have c. 8,400 residents (2020).

== Geography ==
Schieder-Schwalenberg is located between the Teutoburger Wald and the Weserbergland. The district of Schieder is situated on the banks of Schiedersee, an artificial lake that is fed and drained by the River Emmer.

== Population ==
Historical population

Year	Pop.	±% p.a.
1965	7,687	—
1970	8,242	+1.40%
1975	8,480	+0.57%
1980	8,454	−0.06%
1985	8,222	−0.55%
1990	8,865	+1.52%
1995	9,636	+1.68%

Year	Pop.	±% p.a.
2000	9,619	−0.04%
2005	9,287	−0.70%
2010	8,779	−1.12%
2015	8,708	−0.16%
2020	8,355	−0.82%
2025	7,986	−0.90%

Source: Landesdatabank Nordrhein-Westfalen

== Coat of arms ==
The swallow on the red ground depicts Schwalenberg's municipal coat of arms. On the blue ground the crown represents the summer residence of the House of Lippe, the castle at Schieder. The white line in between represents the River Emmer.

== Economy ==
The main industrial sector is the furniture industry. Schieder Möbel are the main producer of furniture. Apart from the furniture branch tourism plays an important part in the economy. Tourists, mainly from Germany, Denmark and the Netherlands, often come to rent holiday flats for a short break. The Schiedersee and the Glashütte district attract many visitors.

== History ==
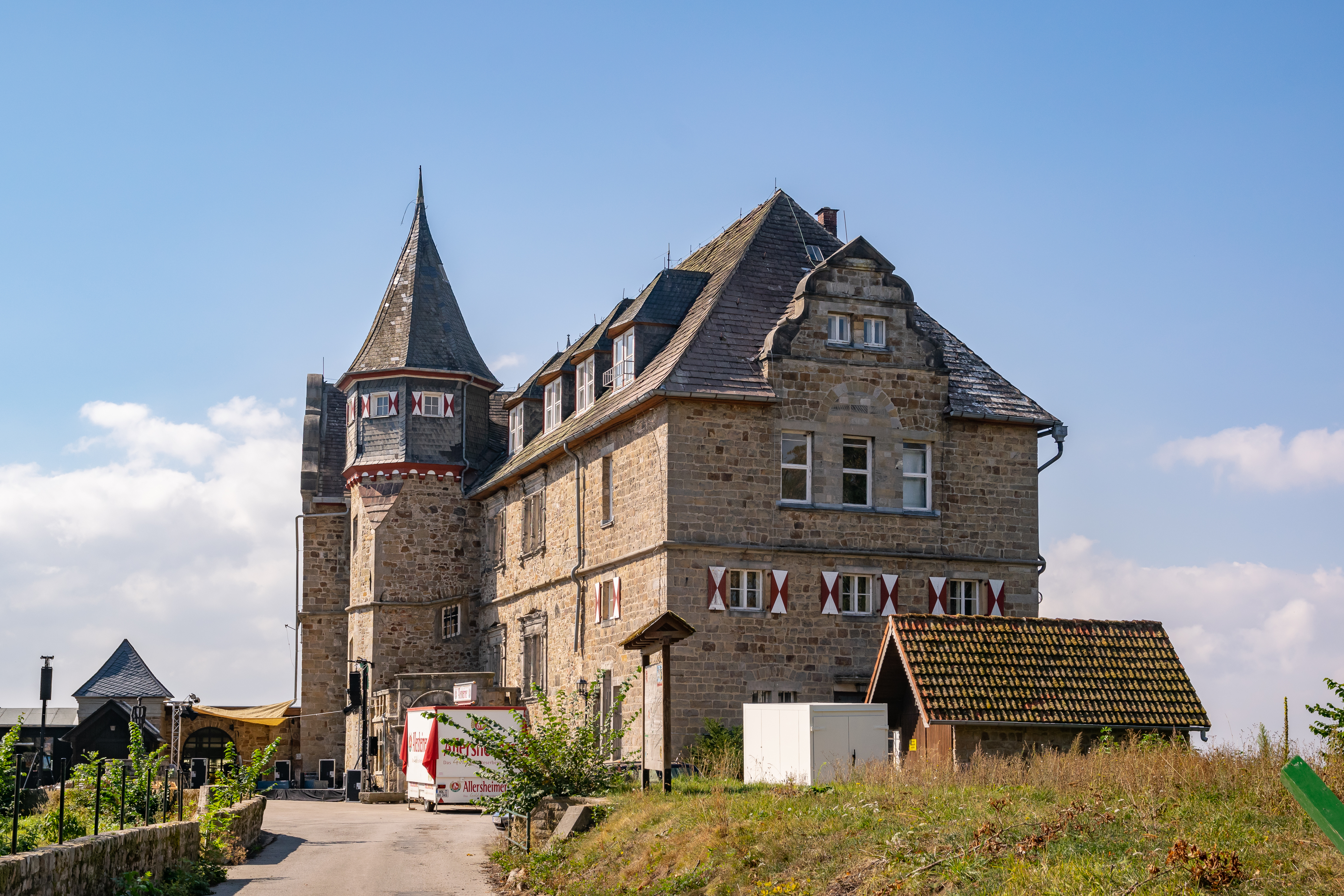
Schwalenberg Castle

The County of Schwalenberg was first mentioned with count Widekind I in 1127. The original seat of the counts had been Oldenburg Castle at Marienmünster. The monastery of Marienmünster was founded by the counts in 1128. Schwalenberg Castle was built between 1228 and 1231 by count Volkwin III. During the 13th century the territory of the counts was split between several branches, creating the county of Schwalenberg itself (then mainly restricted to a small territory around Schwalenberg Castle), the county of Pyrmont (existing from 1194 until 1495), the county of Waldeck (existing as a principality until 1918) and the county of Sternberg (existing from 1243 until 1377, later disputed between the counts of Schaumburg and the counts of Lippe). When the Schwalenberg branch extinguished in 1365, its territory was divided between the House of Lippe (which used Schwalenberg Castle as a seat of junior branches and later distributed parts of the county to its branches Lippe-Biesterfeld and Lippe-Weissenfeld), and the Prince-Bishopric of Paderborn.
