= Barntrup =

- Town
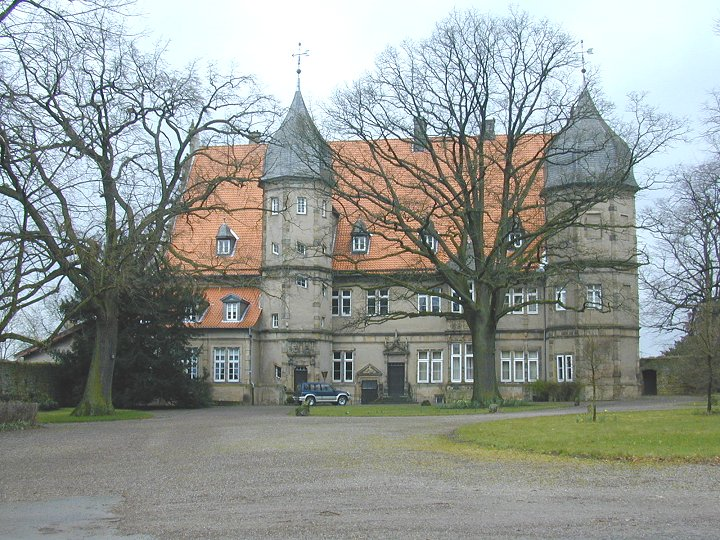

- Coat of arms

- Location of Barntrup within Lippe district
- Interactive map of Barntrup
- Location within Germany Location within North Rhine-Westphalia
- Coordinates: 51°58′59″N 09°07′00″E
- Country: Germany
- State: North Rhine-Westphalia
- Admin. region: Detmold
- District: Lippe
- Subdivisions: 5

Government
  - Mayor (2025–30): Borris Ortmeier (Ind.)

Area
  - Total: 59.46 km^{2} (22.96 sq mi)
- Elevation: 203 m (666 ft)

Population (2025-12-31)
  - Total: 8,248
  - Density: 138.7/km^{2} (359.3/sq mi)
- Time zone: UTC+01:00 (CET)
  - Summer (DST): UTC+02:00 (CEST)
- Postal codes: 32683
- Dialling codes: 05263, 05262 (Alverdissen)
- Vehicle registration: LIP
- Website: www.barntrup.de

Barntrup (German pronunciation: [ˈbaʁntʁʊp]) is a town in the Lippe district of North Rhine-Westphalia, Germany. It has an area of 59.46 km^{2} and 8,501 inhabitants (2019). It lies 40 km east from Bielefeld and 9 km west from Bad Pyrmont at the east border of NRW to Lower Saxony.

== Town division ==
- Alverdissen, a former residence of the House of Lippe-Alverdissen
- Barntrup
- Selbeck
- Sommersell
- Sonneborn

== History ==
Barntrup and Alverdissen were founded by the Earl of Sternberg in the year 1220. Originally Barntrup was called Barendorf and was a village at the Schratweg. Between 1317 and 1359 Barntrup was built on the highest point of the "Thornesberg" which is 189 m high above sea level. This is the central point of Barntrup.

Kerssenbrock Castle (also called Schloss Kerssenbrock or Barntrup Castle, see picture) was constructed from 1584-1588 by Anna von Kerssenbrock (maiden name Anna von Canstein). Her husband, Franz von Kerssenbrock, had been a mercenary in the French Wars of Religion, where he had made much money. The Kerssenbrock family was one of the main noble families in the region. It is still today owned by the von Kerssenbrock-Krosigk family.

== Population ==
Historical population

Year	Pop.	±% p.a.
1965	8,417	—
1970	8,931	+1.19%
1975	8,851	−0.18%
1980	8,742	−0.25%
1985	8,761	+0.04%
1990	8,989	+0.52%
1995	9,616	+1.36%

Year	Pop.	±% p.a.
2000	9,774	+0.33%
2005	9,431	−0.71%
2010	8,910	−1.13%
2015	8,846	−0.14%
2020	8,501	−0.79%
2025	8,248	−0.60%

Source: Landesdatabank Nordrhein-Westfalen

== Politics ==
The current mayor of Barntrup is Borris Ortmeier, an independent. He has been serving as mayor of Barntrup since 2020 and was reelected with 78,33 % of votes in the 2025 local elections.

=== City council ===
After the 2025 local elections, the Barntrup city council is composed as follows:

Party	Votes	%	+/-	Seats	+/-
Christian Democratic Union (CDU)	2,049	48.4	▲3.2	13	±0
Social Democratic Party (SPD)	999	23.6	▲0.4	7	±0
Alliance 90/The Greens (Grüne)	434	10.3	▼5.6	3	▼1
Independent Voters' Association Barntrup (UWB)	287	6.8	▼0.7	2	±0
Free Democratic Party (FDP)	260	6.1	▼2.1	2	±0
Alternative for Germany (AfD)	206	4.9	New	1	New
Valid votes	4,235	97.0			
Invalid votes	130	3.0			
Total	4,365	100.0		28	±0
Electorate/voter turnout	6,764	64.5			
Source: City of Barntrup

== Education ==
- Primary school "von-Haxthausen Grundschule" has at this time 420 pupils and 21 teachers.
- High school "Städtisches Gymnasium Barntrup" has about 920 pupils and 50 teachers.
- Junior high school "Hauptschule des Schulverbandes Barntrup-Dörentrup" has about 350 pupils.

== Sons and daughters of the town ==
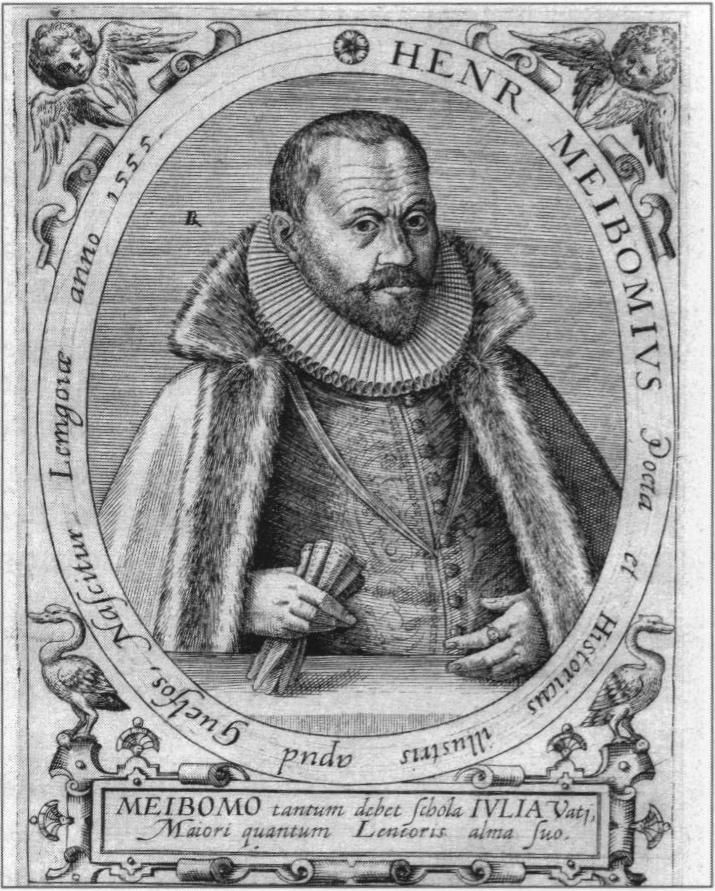
Heinrich Meibom

- Hermann von Kerssenbroch (1519-1585), longtime rector of the High School Paulinum in Münster (Westfalen)
- Heinrich Meibom (1555-1625), poet and historian
- Ulrich Born (born 1950), lawyer and politician (CDU)

== Literature ==
- Böttcher, Martin und Erika, ed. (1976), 600 Jahre Barntrup 1376–1976 (in German), Barntrup: Lippischer Heimatbund
- Dedo von Kerßenbrock-Krosigk (2009), Schloss Barntrup (Lippische Kulturlandschaften, Heft 12) (in German), Detmold, ISBN 978-3-941726-09-3
- Knese, Louis (1977), Zauberwahn und Hexenprozesse in Barntrup (in German), Detmold: Lippischer Heimatbund (u. a.)
- Hartwig Walberg; Michael Tönsing (1988), Heinz Stoob; Wilfried Ehbrecht (eds.), Westfälischer Städteatlas (in German), vol. Band: III, 1. Teilband, Altenbeken: GSV-Städteatlas-Verlag, ISBN 3-89115-121-7

== Economy ==
The power transmission and industrial automation company KEB Automation KG is located in Barntrup.
