= Philipp-Ernst, Prince of Schaumburg-Lippe =

Philipp-Ernst
- Prince of Schaumburg-Lippe

Head of the House Schaumburg-Lippe
- Tenure: 15 June 1962 – 28 August 2003
- Predecessor: Prince Wolrad
- Successor: Prince Alexander
- Born: July 26, 1928; Hagenburg
- Died: August 28, 2003 (aged 75); Bückeburg
- Spouse: Eva-Benita Baroness von Tiele-Winckler (m. 1955)
- Issue: Georg-Wilhelm of Schaumburg-Lippe; Alexander, Prince of Schaumburg-Lippe
Names
- Friedrich August Philipp-Ernst Wolrad
- House: Lippe
- Father: Prince Wolrad
- Mother: Princess Bathildis of Schaumburg-Lippe

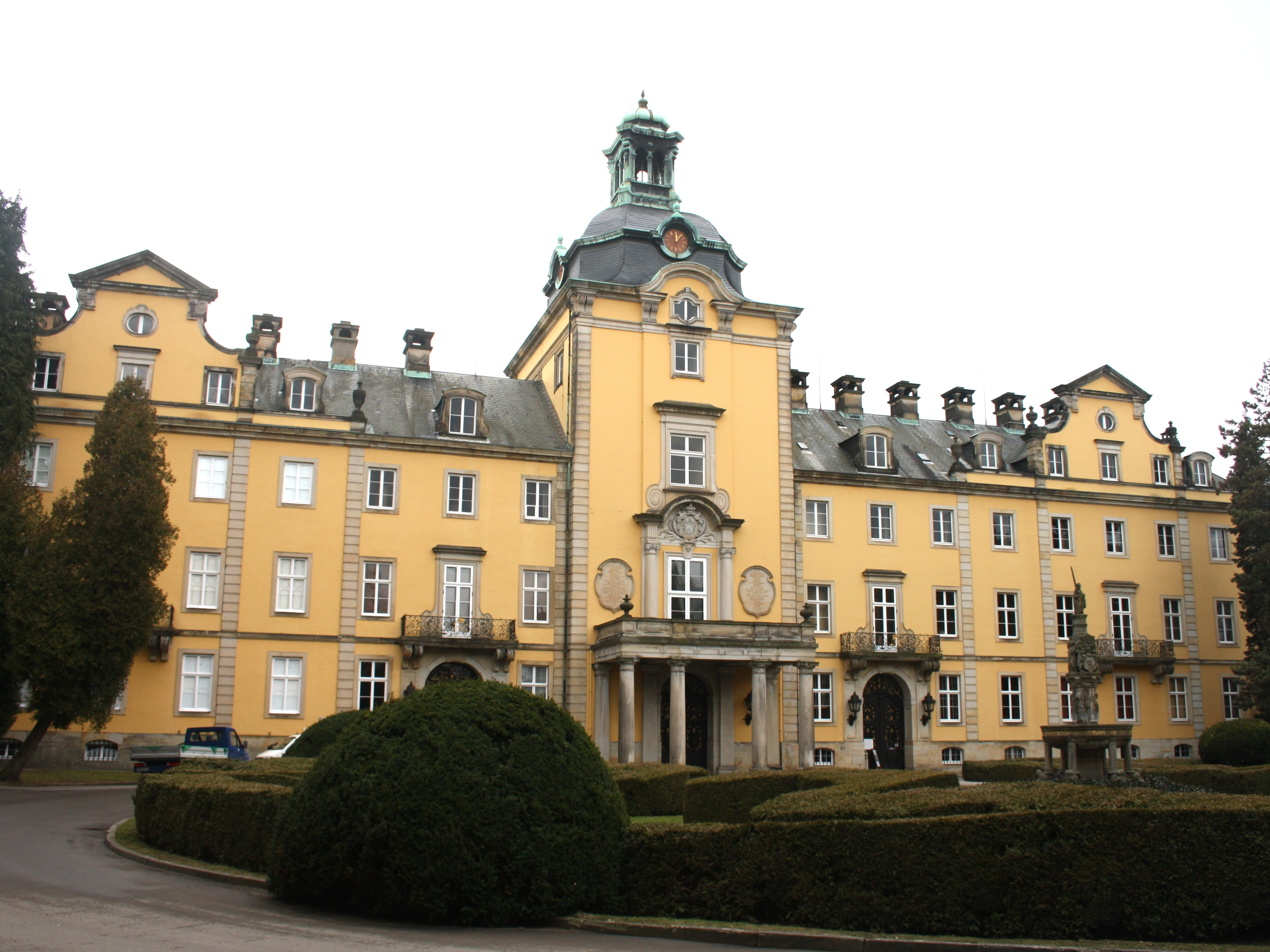
Bückeburg castle

Philipp-Ernst, Prince of Schaumburg-Lippe (Friedrich August Philipp-Ernst Wolrad; 26 July 1928 – 28 August 2003) was a head of the Princely House of Schaumburg-Lippe.

== Biography ==
He was born in Hagenburg, the second son of Prince Wolrad of Schaumburg-Lippe and his wife Princess Bathildis of Schaumburg-Lippe (1903–1983). Following the death of his uncle Prince Adolf II in a plane crash in 1936, Philipp-Ernst's father Wolrad became the new head of the House of Schaumburg-Lippe.

After his older brother, Hereditary Prince Georg-Wilhelm, was killed in action at Nössige, Saxony, on 29 April 1945 during the second world war, Philipp-Ernst became the new heir apparent to the House of Schaumburg-Lippe. Philipp-Ernst succeeded to the headship of the house on the death of his father on 15 June 1962.

Prince Philipp-Ernst visited Schaumburg, Illinois, the sister city of Schaumburg-Lippe, several times. The last time he visited was in 1998.

He remained head until his death at Bückeburg, when he was succeeded by his only surviving son, Alexander.

== Marriage and children ==
He was married to Eva-Benita Baroness von Tiele-Winckler (1927–2013) at Bückeburg on 3 October 1955. She was the eldest daughter of Hans-Werner, Count von Tiele-Winckler and his wife, Countess Elisabeth von Bassewitz. They had two sons, with the elder Georg-Wilhelm dying in a motorcycle accident in 1983.

- Georg-Wilhelm (1956–1983), died unmarried and without issue.
- Alexander (born 1958)

== Ancestry ==
Ancestors of Philipp-Ernst, Prince of Schaumburg-Lippe

16. George William, Prince of Schaumburg-Lippe
8. Adolf I, Prince of Schaumburg-Lippe
17. Princess Ida of Waldeck and Pyrmont
4. George, Prince of Schaumburg-Lippe
18. George II, Prince of Waldeck and Pyrmont
9. Princess Hermine of Waldeck and Pyrmont
19. Princess Emma of Anhalt-Bernburg-Schaumburg-Hoym
2. Wolrad, Prince of Schaumburg-Lippe
20. Georg, Duke of Saxe-Altenburg
10. Prince Moritz of Saxe-Altenburg
21. Duchess Marie Louise of Mecklenburg-Schwerin
5. Princess Marie Anne of Saxe-Altenburg
22. Bernhard II, Duke of Saxe-Meiningen
11. Princess Augusta of Saxe-Meiningen
23. Princess Marie Frederica of Hesse-Kassel
1. Philipp Ernst, Prince of Schaumburg-Lippe
24. George William, Prince of Schaumburg-Lippe (= 16)
12. Prince William of Schaumburg-Lippe
25. Princess Ida of Waldeck and Pyrmont (= 17)
6. Prince Albrecht of Schaumburg-Lippe
26. Prince Frederick Augustus of Anhalt-Dessau
13. Princess Bathildis of Anhalt-Dessau
27. Princess Marie Luise Charlotte of Hesse-Kassel
3. Princess Bathildis of Schaumburg-Lippe
28. Duke Eugen of Württemberg
14. Duke Eugen of Württemberg
29. Princess Mathilde of Schaumburg-Lippe
7. Duchess Elsa of Württemberg
30. Grand Duke Konstantin Nikolayevich of Russia
15. Grand Duchess Vera Constantinovna of Russia
31. Princess Alexandra of Saxe-Altenburg

Philipp-Ernst, Prince of Schaumburg-Lippe House of Lippe Born: 26 July 1928 Died: 28 August 2003
Titles in pretence
Preceded by Prince Wolrad	— TITULAR — Prince of Schaumburg-Lippe; 15 June 1962 – 28 August 2003	Succeeded by Prince Alexander
