= Countess Johanna Sophia of Hohenlohe-Langenburg =

Johanna Sophia of Hohenlohe-Langenburg
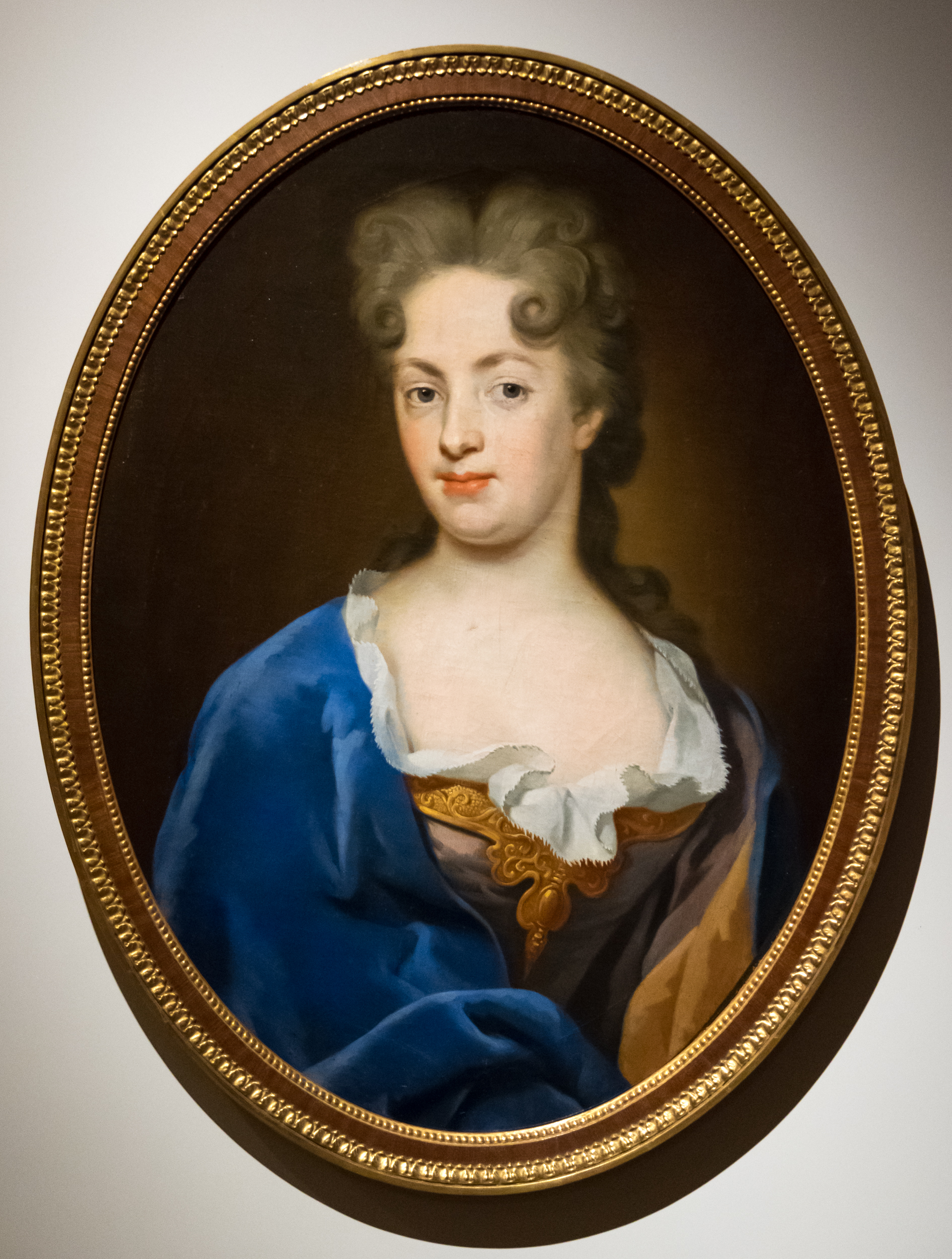
- Portrait by Hans Hinrich Rundt
- Born: 16 December 1673; Langenburg
- Died: 18 August 1743 (aged 69); Stadthagen
- Noble family: House of Hohenlohe
- Spouse: Frederick Christian, Count of Schaumburg-Lippe
- Father: Henry Frederick, Count of Hohenlohe-Langenburg
- Mother: Dorothea Juliana Countess of Castell-Remlingen

Countess Johanna Sophia of Hohenlohe-Langenburg (16 December 1673 in Langenburg – 18 August 1743 in Stadthagen) was a German noblewoman, by birth member of the House of Hohenlohe and by marriage Countess of Schaumburg-Lippe.

== Early life ==
Countess Johanna Sophia von Hohenlohe-Langenburg was the sixth daughter of Count Henry Frederick of Hohenlohe-Langenburg and his second wife, Dorothea Juliana, Countess of Castell-Remlingen (1640–1706). Besides her beauty, she was also said to be a clever and apt pupil.

== Marriage and issue ==
On 4 January 1691 in Langenburg Johanna Sophia married Count Frederick Christian of Schaumburg-Lippe (1655–1728). Early in their marriage, she was allowed to accompany her husband, who traveled a great deal, but later was left behind more often. When disagreements erupted between Johanna Sophie and her husband, she moved with her two sons to Hanover. The marriage ended in divorce in 1723. Two years later, on 3 December 1725 Frederick Christian married his mistress, Maria Anna Victoria von Gall (1707–1760), daughter of Johann Michael von Gall and his wife, Maria Anna von Enzenberg.

Johanna Sophia and Frederick Christian had the following children:

- Frederick August (1693–1694)
- Wilhelm Ludwig (1695-1695)
- Sophie Charlotte (1697–1697)
- Philip (1697–1698)
- Albert Wolfgang (1699–1748), Count of Schaumburg-Lippe 1728–1748
- Frederick Charles Louis (1702–1776)

== Later life ==
Johanna Sophia became friends with the Electoral Princess Caroline of Brandenburg-Ansbach (1683–1737), later wife of King George II and accompanied her to the United Kingdom. The Countess was a Lady-in-waiting at the English court of the Kings of Hanover in London.
