= Prince Friedrich Christian of Schaumburg-Lippe =

Prince of Schaumburg-Lippe (1906–1983)

Prince Friedrich Christian
- Friedrich Christian in 1922
- Born: 5 June 1906; Bückeburg, Schaumburg-Lippe, German Empire
- Died: 20 September 1983 (aged 77); Wasserburg, West Germany
- Burial: Bückeburg Mausoleum
- Spouse: Countess Alexandra Hedwig zu Castell-Rüdenhausen (m. 1927; died 1961) Princess Marie Louise of Schleswig-Holstein-Sonderburg-Glücksburg (m. 1962; died 1969) Helene Mayr (m. 1971)
- Issue: Marie Elisabeth; Albrecht-Wolfgange; Christine
Names
- Friedrich Christian Wilhelm Alexander Prinz zu Schaumburg-Lippe
- House: House of Lippe
- Father: Georg, Prince of Schaumburg-Lippe
- Mother: Princess Marie Anne of Saxe-Altenburg

Prince Friedrich Christian of Schaumburg-Lippe (5 June 1906 – 20 September 1983) was a German prince, the youngest son of Georg, Prince of Schaumburg-Lippe and his consort Princess Marie Anne of Saxe-Altenburg.

Unhappy and disillusioned with the state of Germany after World War I, Friedrich Christian turned to the Nazi Party as a solution for the country's ills. As an ardent Party supporter, he worked vigorously to gain noble and royal support for it, and eventually became an upper privy councillor and adjutant to Propaganda Minister Joseph Goebbels. In 1939, Friedrich Christian was asked to become king of Iceland by Icelanders sympathetic to the Nazi party, but refused due to the opposition of Foreign Minister Joachim von Ribbentrop.

After World War II, the prince devoted his writings to defending the record of the Third Reich, producing such works as Was Hitler Really a Dictator? (a personal account of the German leader) and "Als die goldne Abendsonne..." Aus meinen Tagebüchern der Jahre 1933–1937 (the prince's personal diaries).

== Family and early life ==
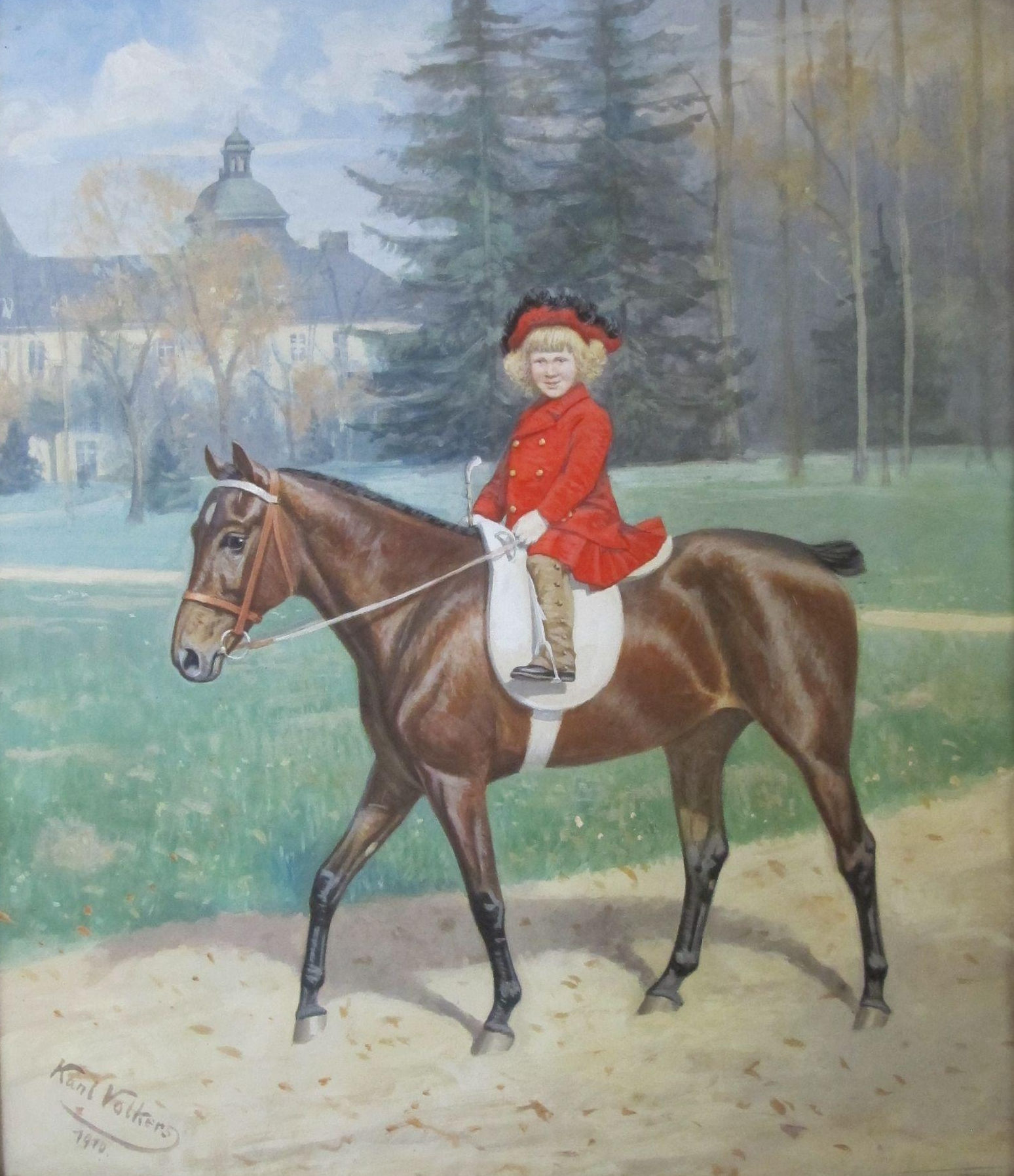
Prince Friedrich Christian 4 years old. Portrait by Karl Volkers, 1910.

Prince Friedrich Christian of Schaumburg-Lippe was the eighth and youngest son of Georg, the reigning Prince of Schaumburg-Lippe, and his consort Princess Marie Anne of Saxe-Altenburg. During the German Revolution of 1918–19, Friedrich's brother Adolf II was the "last German prince forced to abdicate... With regard to his property, the prince [Adolf II] and the small state divided it half and half. Enough money therefore remained for him to throw full handfuls out the window." As a consequence of this compromise, and the fact that the family's wealth historically came from land and investments in Eastern Europe, the Schaumburg-Lippes were decidedly better off than many other royal families – they were even allowed to maintain their residence at Schloss Bückeburg.

== Association with Nazism ==
=== Background ===
Like much of Germany during that period, Prince Friedrich Christian had felt disillusioned and disgusted by the abdication and flight of Emperor Wilhelm II at the end of World War I, and had felt even more unhappy over what he viewed as the "cowardly abdications" of the German princes to the revolutionaries in 1918. Under the Weimar regime, many of these same princes "abandoned ancient principles of honor and fidelity and accommodated themselves to the egotistical, materialist values of the despised" new government, to Friedrich Christian's further disgust and anger. The prince wished for a restoration of the monarchy, but for it to be unlike anything it had been before; he believed that Adolf Hitler was also in tandem with these views, writing in his diary, "Hitler was in principle for the monarchy, but not for the continuation of that which, in his opinion, had failed totally." Friedrich Christian later wrote in his 1934 work Der Adel ist tot - es lebe der Adel:

"The German nobility miserably missed its last opportunity to demonstrate its right to exist. Exceptions here only prove the rule. The question the people puts to you today is harsh and clear: Where were you noble gentlemen when Germany was in its last throes?... Where did you fight, and what sacrifices did you make? You thought of yourselves and of the welfare of your families. Maybe you lamented the wretchedness of the people, maybe it distressed you, but you did nothing! Nothing! And you still dare today to claim a leadership role?"

By the mid-1920s, Friedrich Christian was fundamentally convinced that those who still treasured the old values of the nobility needed to break down the ancient barriers separating them from the common people, reach out to the masses, and side with the Nazis and their message. The prince "liked to think of his own class as an 'avant-garde' of National Socialism" and of the "National Socialists as true heirs of the old nobility."

Unlike many other royalty during that time, who were cautious at first of showing support to the new ideological movement, Friedrich Christian, like his brother Prince Stephan, was an early supporter of the Nazi party, officially joining the rising political group in 1929; another source however has the prince actually working with the Nazis as early as August 1928 after a relative, Hereditary Prince Ernst of Lippe, had joined three months earlier. The House of Schaumburg-Lippe would eventually come to have ten members in the Nazi party. Hitler wanted these high-ranking members of society for propaganda reasons - the more who joined, the more socially acceptable his new regime would be. Like Friedrich and his brother Prince Wolrad, Hitler appointed many of these new members to the Sturmabteilung as stormtroopers, as he wanted the organization to bring together individuals from all levels of society. In its early years, Hitler was more concerned with votes and finances than consistent ideology, and consequently did his best to ease and hasten the process for new members. As a result, Hitler made various assurances to its new and prospective members, stating the movement had room for republicans and monarchists alike and leading them to believe he intended to restore the monarchy.

=== Official member ===
Friedrich Christian was an ardent supporter of the Nazi party, becoming a speaker for the party in 1929, and working vigorously to gain the support of other noble families behind Hitler. He worked closely with Propaganda Minister Joseph Goebbels. Goebbels made a concerted effort to gain the prince's help, and gave him a position in the newly created Ministry of Public Enlightenment and Propaganda. By April 1933, Friedrich Christian was both an upper privy councillor and Goebbels' adjutant. In May of that year, the prince arranged for the Minister's involvement in the Berlin University book burning. In 1938, the prince was sent to Sweden to drum up support for the German government; as is evident from photographs and diaries during that time, Hitler and Goebbels both held Friedrich Christian in high esteem.

As World War II continued with German military defeats, Hitler became increasingly more suspicious of these high-ranking and cosmopolitan members of royal and noble families, questioning their loyalties. By 1943 he secretly ordered all branches of the Nazi bureaucracies to compile a record of members with "international contacts" (often by way of a spouse), and then personally made the decision as to whether they should be "retired" or allowed to stay. Most of the princes were unwillingly booted out of the party as a result. Goebbels attempted to protect Friedrich Christian from these new demands by trying to obtain a special waiver; Hitler's secretary had doubts about the prince however and refused the request. Goebbels thus had to go to Hitler directly and ask for the prince's "future deployment in the Propaganda Ministry", vouching that he was "the holder of the golden badge of honor and a trusted National Socialist"; In January 1944, Hitler relented by declaring his May 1943 decree did not apply to the prince, thus allowing Friedrich Christian to continue his service to the party. Unlike other Nazi-associated royalty, Friedrich Christian retained his post until 17 July 1944, when he also relinquished his commission in the SA.

Although he was from one of Germany's wealthiest noble families and resided in a villa near Bonn with several servants, Friedrich Christian associated himself with the left wing of the Nazi party, stressing socialist elements in his speeches and writings.

=== King of Iceland ===
Three Icelandic Nazi sympathizers visited Friedrich Christian in 1939 and asked him to become king of Iceland when Germany took control of their country, as they hoped would happen in order to win Iceland's independence from Denmark. Friedrich Christian treated this as a realistic prospect and brought it to the attention of Joseph Goebbels. In his 1952 autobiography, Zwischen Krone und Kerker, the prince recalled that Goebbels had reacted favorably to the idea, but Foreign Minister Joachim von Ribbentrop did not.

In his memoirs, Friedrich Christian did not name the three Icelanders, though he identified them as an orchestra conductor, a renowned writer and a conservative politician. The conductor is generally believed to have been Jón Leifs, who was living in Germany at the time and had publicly advocated for Iceland to become an independent monarchy with its own king.

== Later years ==
In 1947, four German princes (Friedrich Christian, Prince August Wilhelm of Prussia, Prince Philipp of Hesse, and Hereditary Prince Ernst of Lippe) were brought under arrest to the war crimes jail at Nuremberg in order to appear as witnesses in a portion of the 16 trials of high-ranking Nazi criminals. Viewed as an "old-line party member" who made propaganda excursions to many foreign countries on Goebbels' behalf, Friedrich Christian was the last of the four to testify.

Friedrich Christian had an unwavering adherence to Nazi ideology (both the nationalist and racist aspects), something that was unchanged even after the German regime fell in 1945. Consequently, like his distant cousin and fellow Nazi party member Princess Marie Adelheid of Lippe, Friedrich Christian was outspoken in his defense of the Third Reich. He wrote numerous books and articles on the subject, including Zwischen Krone und Kerker (Wiesbaden, 1952) and Souveräne Menschen. Kleine Lebensregeln, grossgeschrieben (Druffel, Leonie am Starnberger See 1955, 1962).

Both in his works and direct overtures to the press, Friedrich Christian gave detailed accounts of his time in the Nazi party. In 1963 for instance, he claimed that Hitler refused to shave his famous mustache because people would think he was "sick". He said his wife Alexandra commented to Hitler that "his haircut and little mustache were always openings for cartoonists", but that Hitler replied "one shouldn't change a company's trademark, even if one doesn't like it any longer. The public has become so used to it over the years that it would rebel if he suddenly looked completely different."

== Personal life ==
On 25 September 1927 in Seeläsgen, Prince Friedrich Christian married Countess Alexandra Hedwig Johanna Bertha Marie zu Castell-Rüdenhausen, daughter of Count Wolfgang zu Castell-Rüdenhausen and his wife, Baroness Hedwig von Faber. They had three children.

Prince Friedrich Christian's wife Princess Alexandra died on 9 September 1961.

On 15 October 1962, Prince Friedrich Christian married secondly Princess Marie Louise Schleswig-Holstein-Sonderburg-Glücksburg, eldest child of Prince Albrecht of Schleswig-Holstein-Sonderburg-Glücksburg and his wife, Countess Ortrud of Ysenburg-Büdingen-Meerholz; it was the second marriage for both of them. They had no children, and the princess died on 29 December 1969.

On 6 March 1971, Prince Friedrich Christian married for the third and final time, to Helene Mayr. She was daughter of Lieutenant Georg Maximillian Mayr and his wife, Baroness Antonie Barth von Bartolf, former wife of Duke Ludwig Wilhelm in Bavaria.

== List of works ==
- "Der Adel ist tot - es lebe der Adel" in Woe war der Adel? (Berlin, 1934).
- Deutsche Sozialisten am Werk. Ein sozialistisches Bekenntnis deutscher Männer (Berlin, 1935)
- Gegen eine Welt von Vorurteilen (Reihe: Hirts deutsche Sammlung, 1937)
- Fahnen gegen Fetzen (Berlin, 1938)
- Zwischen Krone und Kerker (Wiesbaden, 1952)
- Souveräne Menschen. Kleine Lebensregeln, grossgeschrieben (Druffel, Leonie am Starnberger See 1955, 1962)
- „Dr. G.“. Ein Porträt des Propagandaministers (Wiesbaden, 1964); (Lizenz für Arndt Kiel 1990)
- Verdammte Pflicht und Schuldigkeit: Weg und Erlebnis 1914-1933 (Leoni am Starnberger See, 1966).
- Damals fing das Neue an. Erlebnisse und Gedanken eines Gefangenen 1945–1948 (Pfeiffer, Hannover, 1969)
- Sonne im Nebel. Aus eigenen Erlebnissen geschildert, als Beweis gegen den Zufall und für die Ordnung allen Seins {H. F. Kathagen, Witten 1970}
- "Als die goldne Abendsonne..." Aus meinen Tagebüchern der Jahre 1933–1937 (Wiesbaden, 1971). These are his published diaries.
- Ich stehe und falle mit meinem deutschen Volke. Das ist mein Sozialismus!, (1985)
- Was Hitler Really a Dictator? (in English and German), translated by Victor Diodon (Nordwind, 1994). As someone who knew Hitler personally, the prince's work produces a different perspective on the German leader.

== Ancestry ==
Ancestors of Prince Friedrich Christian of Schaumburg-Lippe

Georg Wilhelm, Prince of Schaumburg-Lippe
Adolf I, Prince of Schaumburg-Lippe
Princess Ida of Waldeck and Pyrmont
Georg, Prince of Schaumburg-Lippe
Georg II, Prince of Waldeck-Pyrmont
Princess Hermine of Waldeck and Pyrmont
Princess Emma of Anhalt-Bernburg-Schaumburg-Hoym
Prince Friedrich Christian of Schaumburg-Lippe
Georg, Duke of Saxe-Altenburg
Prince Moritz of Saxe-Altenburg
Duchess Marie Louise of Mecklenburg-Schwerin
Princess Marie Anne of Saxe-Altenburg
Bernhard II, Duke of Saxe-Meiningen
Princess Augusta of Saxe-Meiningen
Princess Marie Frederica of Hesse-Kassel
