= County of Schaumburg =

State of the Holy Roman Empire (1110–1640)

Coordinates: 52.2500°N 9.1700°E

County of Schaumburg Grafschaft Schaumburg (German)
- 1110–1640
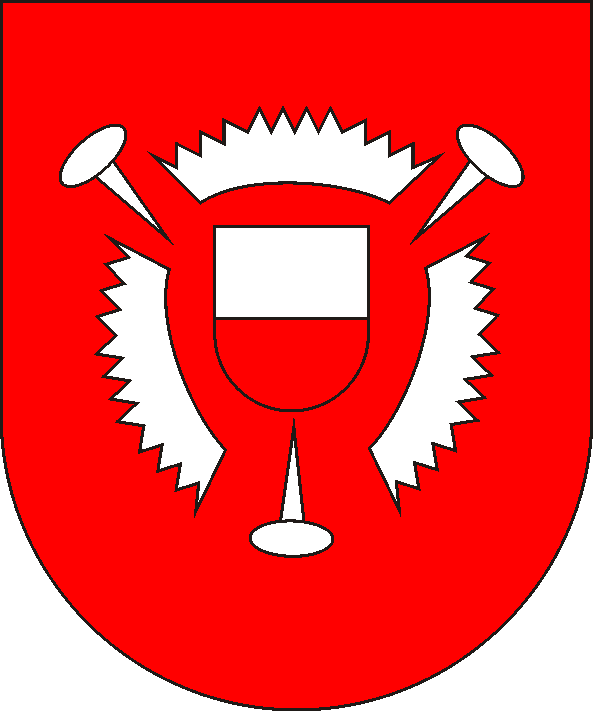
- Coat of arms

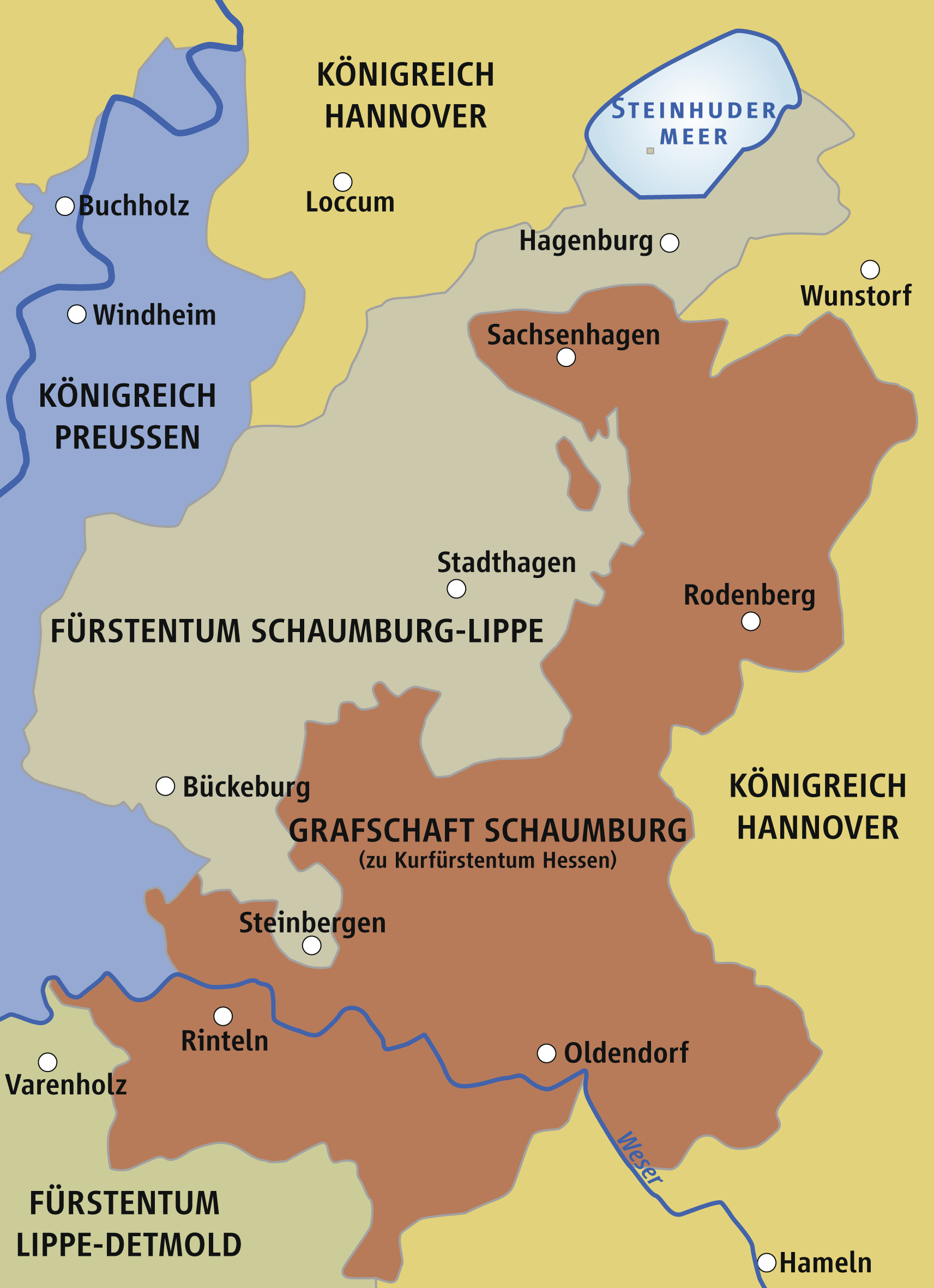
- Map of the two successor territories Principality of Schaumburg-Lippe and County of Schaumburg Hessian share from 1866
- Status: State of the Holy Roman Empire
- Capital: Rinteln
- Common languages: Northern Low Saxon
- Government: County
- Historical era: Middle Ages
  - Established: 1110
  - Partitioned to create Schaumburg-Lippe; remainder to Hesse-Kassel (or Hesse-Cassel): 1640
Preceded by	Succeeded by
Duchy of Saxony	Principality of Schaumburg-Lippe; Landgraviate of Hesse-Kassel

The County of Schaumburg (German: Grafschaft Schaumburg), until ca. 1485 known as Schauenburg, was a state of the Holy Roman Empire, located in the present German state of Lower Saxony. Its territory was more or less congruent with the present district Landkreis Schaumburg.

== History ==
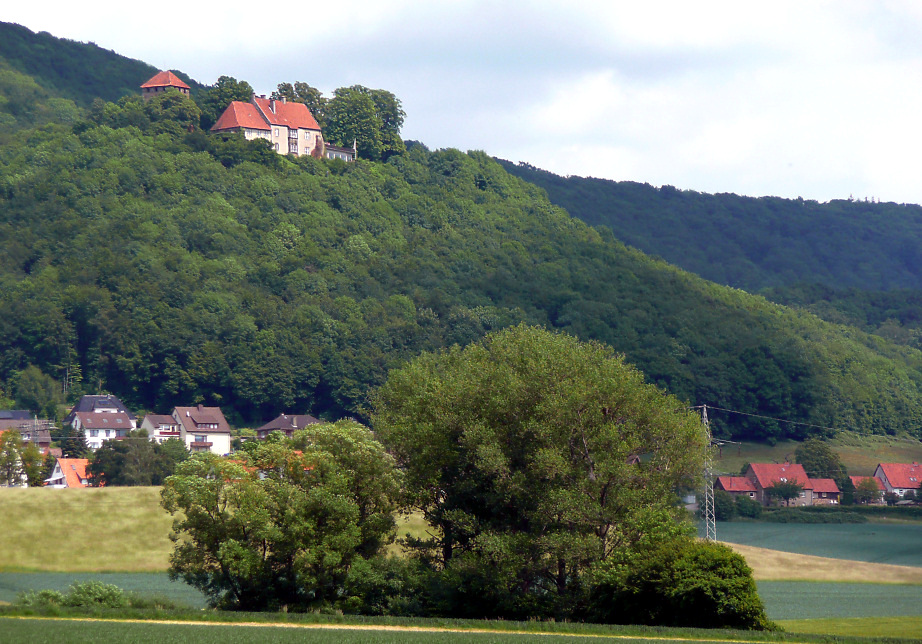
Schaumburg Castle photographed in 2009.

Schaumburg originated as a medieval county, which was founded at the beginning of the 12th century. Adolf I probably became the first Lord of Schauenburg around this time. It was named after Schauenburg Castle, near Rinteln on the Weser, where the owners started calling themselves Lords (from 1295 Counts) of Schauenburg.

Nettle leaf ancestral coat of arms of the Counts of Schaumburg

In 1110, Adolf I, Lord of Schauenburg was appointed by Lothair, Duke of Saxony to hold Holstein and Stormarn, including Hamburg, as fiefs. Subsequently, the House of Schaumburg were also counts of Holstein and its partitions Holstein-Itzehoe, Holstein-Kiel, Holstein-Pinneberg (until 1640), Holstein-Plön, Holstein-Segeberg and Holstein-Rendsburg (until 1460) and through the latter at times also the dukes of Schleswig.

Count Adolf IV was an active ruler and founded the cities of Stadthagen and Rinteln.

From 1500 the County of Schaumburg belonged to the Lower Rhenish-Westphalian Circle of the Holy Roman Empire.

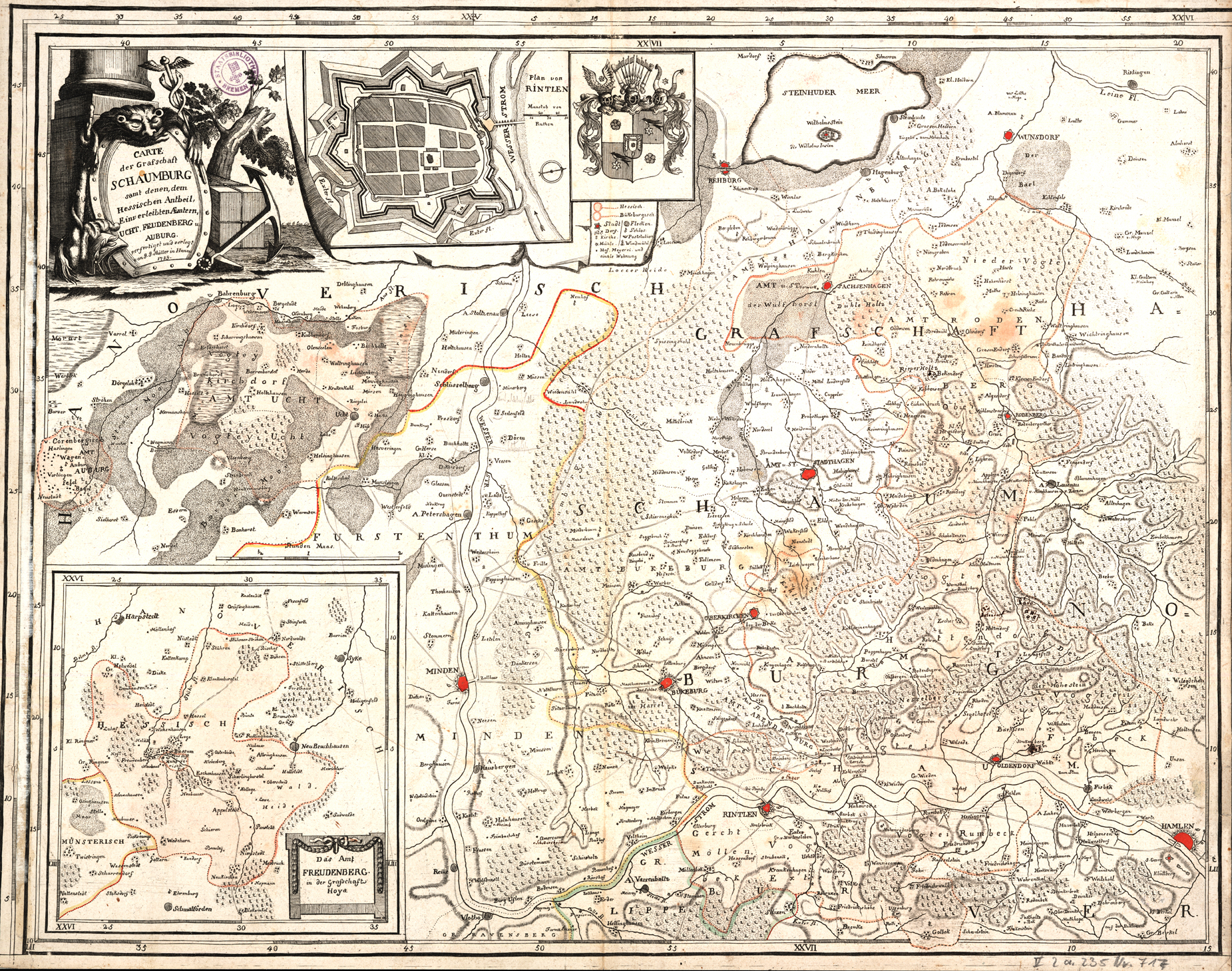
Historic map of the County of Schaumburg from 1789 – showing both the Schaumburg-Lippe and the Hessian parts.

After the childless death in 1640 of Count Otto V, the House of Schaumburg became extinct. The County of Holstein-Pinneberg was merged with the Duchy of Holstein. The County of Schaumburg proper was partitioned among the agnatic Schaumburg heirs into three parts, one incorporated into the ducal Brunswick and Lunenburgian Principality of Lüneburg, the largest portion becoming the County of Schaumburg-Lippe, and the eastern territory continuing the name County of Schaumburg (Grafschaft Schaumburg hessischen Anteils, 'County of Schaumburg Hessian portion'), ruled in personal union by Hesse-Cassel. Even after the Prussian annexation of both Hanover (the successor to Brunswick-Lüneburg) and Electoral Hesse (the successor to Hesse-Cassel) the Hessian part remained an exclave of the Province of Hesse-Nassau until it was transferred to the Province of Hanover in 1932. All three are now part of the state of Lower Saxony.

When the District of Schaumburg (Landkreis Schaumburg) was formed in middle Lower Saxony in 1977, it chose to use a coat of arms derived from the ancient arms of the Counts of Schaumberg.

Landkreis Schaumburg coat of arms.

== Counts of Schauenburg ==
- 1106–1130 Adolf I
- 1130–1164 Adolf II
- 1164–1225 Adolf III
- 1225–1238 Adolf IV
- 1238–1290 Gerhard I
- 1290–1315 Adolf VI
- 1315–1354 Adolf VII
- 1354–1370 Adolf VIII
- 1370–1404 Otto I
- 1404–1426 Adolf IX
- 1426–1464 Otto II (1400–1464)
- 1464–1474 Adolf X (1419–1474)
- 1474–1492 Erich (1420–1492)
- 1492–1510 Otto III (1426–1510)
- 1510–1526 Antonius (1439–1526)
- 1526–1527 John IV (1449–1527)
- 1527–1531 Jobst I (1483–1531)
- 1531–1560 John V (joint rule with his brother Otto IV since 1544)
  - 1531–1581 Jobst II (ca. 1520–1581) ruled the Herrschaft of Gemen
- 1544–1576 Otto IV (1517–1576), prince-bishop of Hildesheim in 1531–1537 as Otto III, converted to the teachings of Martin Luther and began Reformation in 1559, jointly with his brother John V until 1560
- 1576–1601 Adolf XI (1547–1601)
- 1601–1622 Ernst (1569–1622)
- 1622–1635 Jobst Herman (1593–1635)
- 1635–1640 Otto V (1614–1640)

== See also ==
- Schaumburg-Lippe
- Schaumburg

== Bibliography ==
- Matthias Blazek: Die Grafschaft Schaumburg 1647–1977. ibidem, Stuttgart 2011 ISBN 978-3-8382-0257-0
- Walter Maack: Die Geschichte der Grafschaft Schaumburg, 3. Aufl., Rinteln 1986
