= Von Donop =

Von Donop is a German surname. Notable people with the surname include:

- Carl von Donop (1732–1777), Hessian soldier who fought in the American Revolutionary War
- Georg von Donop (1767–1845), German statesman and historian
- Pelham George von Donop (1851–1921), British soldier and Chief Inspector of Railways
- Sir Stanley von Donop (1860–1941), British soldier who became Master-General of the Ordnance

== See also ==
- Von Donop Marine Provincial Park, now Háthayim Marine Provincial Park, a provincial park in British Columbia
