= Marie Kreft =

German politician (1876–1963)

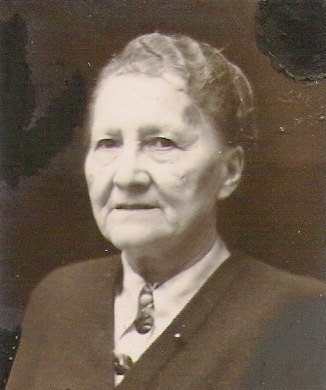
- Kreft c. 1930

Member of the Landtag of Schaumburg-Lippe for Stadthagen
- In office February 1919 – July 1933

Personal details
- Born: Marie Fahsing; 4 November 1876 Stadthagen, Schaumburg-Lippe, German Empire
- Died: 4 September 1963 (aged 86) Stadthagen, Lower Saxony, West Germany
- Party: SPD (after 1910)
- Spouse: Wilhelm Kreft (m. 1899; died 1915)
- Children: 2

Marie Kreft (née Fahsing; 4 November 1876 – 4 September 1963) was a German politician of the Social Democratic Party. She was the only woman ever elected to the Landtag of Schaumburg-Lippe, serving from 1919 until 1933.

== Biography ==
Marie Kreft (née Fahsing) was born on 4 November 1876 in Stadthagen, then part of the Principality of Schaumburg-Lippe in the German Empire. Her father was a bricklayer. In 1899, she married carpenter Wilhelm Kreft, who later became a prominent member of the local Social Democratic Party (SPD) and the director of a consumer cooperative in Stadthagen. Her husband and one of their sons were killed in action during World War I. She was Protestant.

Kreft joined the SPD in August 1910, becoming the first female member of the party in Schaumburg-Lippe. She became a prominent member of the party's women's movement in 1915. In the 1919 election – the first elections in the newly-established Free State of Schaumburg-Lippe – Kreft was elected to the Stadthagen constituency in the Landtag of Schaumburg-Lippe, becoming the only woman to ever serve in the body. She was a member of the Landtag until 1933, when women were barred from holding political office by the Nazi Party following their seizure of power.

Kreft was arrested twice during the Nazi era. In 1933, she was imprisoned for two weeks at the city prison in Stadthagen. In 1944, she was imprisoned for two months as part of Aktion Gitter, during which the Gestapo arrested and killed several Weimar era politicians in the aftermath of the 20 July plot. Despite this, Kreft still met with Franz Reuther, a prominent local opponent of the Nazi Party. In 1945 – after the end of World War II – Kreft was involved in the rebuilding of the Workers' Welfare Association, becoming the director of the organization's local branch.

Kreft died in Stadthagen on 4 September 1963. Her house on the Echternstraße was the headquarters of the local SPD from 1930 to 1933. Numerous documents and artifacts were hidden in her house during the Nazi era, including a party flag which was rediscovered in 2011.
