= Princess Marie Anne of Saxe-Altenburg =

Princess Marie Anne
- Princess consort of Schaumburg-Lippe
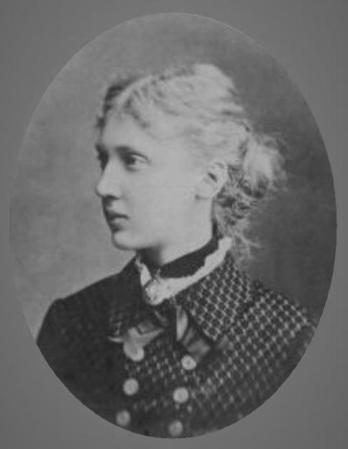
- Marie Anne, c. 1885
- Born: 14 March 1864; Altenburg
- Died: 3 May 1918 (aged 54); Bückeburg
- Burial: Bückeburg Mausoleum
- Spouse: Georg, Prince of Schaumburg-Lippe (m. 1882; died 1911)
- Issue Detail: Adolf II, Prince of Schaumburg-Lippe; Prince Moritz Georg; Prince Peter; Wolrad, Prince of Schaumburg-Lippe; Prince Stephan; Prince Heinrich; Princess Margaretha; Prince Friedrich Christian; Princess Elisabeth
- House: House of Saxe-Altenburg (by birth); House of Lippe (by marriage)
- Father: Prince Moritz of Saxe-Altenburg
- Mother: Princess Augusta of Saxe-Meiningen

Princess Marie Anne of Saxe-Altenburg (14 March 1864 – 3 May 1918) was the consort of Georg, Prince of Schaumburg-Lippe. As the eldest daughter of Prince Moritz of Saxe-Altenburg and Princess Augusta of Saxe-Meiningen, and the sister of Ernest II, Duke of Saxe-Altenburg, Marie Anne was a member of the Ducal House of Saxe-Altenburg.

== Marriage and issue ==
On 16 April 1882 at Altenburg, Marie Anne married Georg, Hereditary Prince of Schaumburg-Lippe. He was the eldest son of Adolf I, Prince of Schaumburg-Lippe, and succeeded as Prince of Schaumburg-Lippe in 1893.

The couple had nine children together:

- Prince Adolf II (1883–1936); married Ellen von Bischoff-Korthaus
- Prince Moritz Georg (1884–1920); there were rumors of an engagement to Princess Olga of Hanover, the youngest daughter of Crown Prince Ernest Augustus of Hanover in 1913, but it did not materialize; he died unmarried in Wrocław.
- Prince Peter (1886–1886)
- Prince Wolrad (1887–1962); married Princess Bathildis of Schaumburg-Lippe, a distant cousin
- Prince Stephan (1891–1965); married Duchess Ingeborg of Oldenburg, daughter of Frederick Augustus II, Grand Duke of Oldenburg; their children included Princess Marie Alix of Schaumburg-Lippe.
- Prince Heinrich (1894–1952); married Countess Marie-Erika von Hardenberg
- Princess Margaretha (1896–1897)
- Prince Friedrich Christian (1906–1983); married Countess Alexandra Hedwig Johanna Bertha Marie zu Castell-Rüdenhausen
- Princess Elisabeth (1908–1933); married Baron Johann Herring von Frankensdorff

=== Silver wedding anniversary ===
On the occasion of their silver wedding anniversary in 1907, Emperor Wilhelm II presented to Georg and Marie Anne the family ancestral seat, Castle Schaumburg. The castle had been controlled by the Hohenzollerns ever since Georg's grandfather sided with the Austrians in the 1866 Austro-Prussian War. The gift was also meant to be in recognition of Georg's support in the dispute over the succession to the Lippe-Detmold throne.

Prince George died on 29 April 1911. Princess Marie Anne died seven years later, on 3 May 1918 at age 54.

== See also ==
- List of consorts of Lippe

Princess Marie Anne of Saxe-Altenburg House of Saxe-Altenburg Cadet branch of the House of Wettin Born: 14 March 1864 Died: 3 May 1918
German royalty
Preceded by Hermine of Waldeck and Pyrmont	Princess consort Schaumburg-Lippe; 8 May 1893 – 29 April 1911	None; Principality abolished
