= Alexander, Prince of Schaumburg-Lippe =

Prince of Schaumburg-Lippe

Alexander
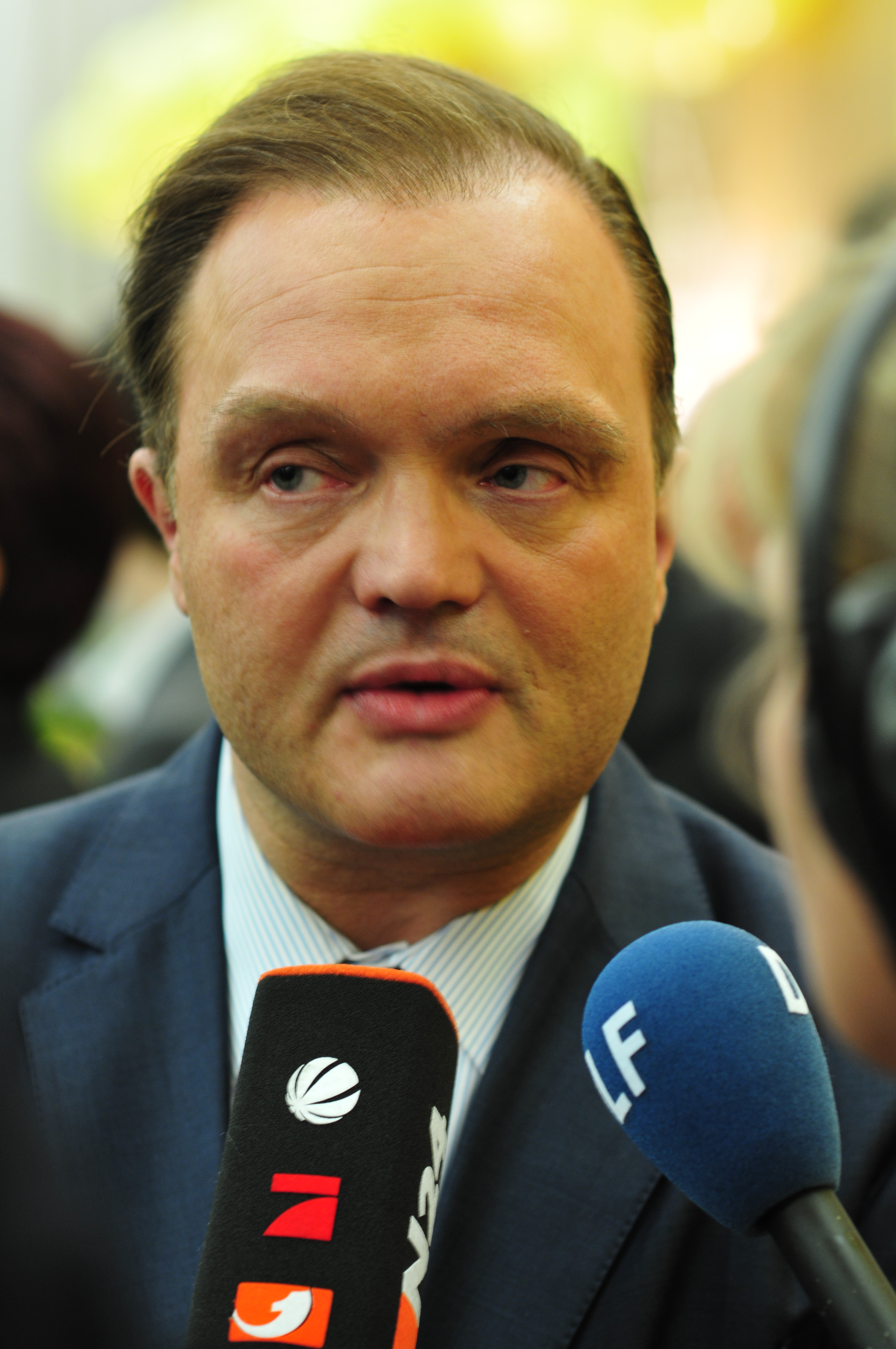
- Alexander in 2013

Head of the House Schaumburg-Lippe
- Tenure: 28 August 2003–present
- Predecessor: Philipp-Ernst, Prince of Schaumburg-Lippe
- Heir apparent: Heinrich Donatus, Hereditary Prince of Schaumburg-Lippe
- Born: 25 December 1958 (age 67); Düsseldorf, Germany
- Spouse: Princess Marie Luise of Sayn-Wittgenstein-Berleburg (m. 1993; div. 2002) Nadja Anna Zsoeks (m. 2007; div. 2018) Mahkameh Navabi (m. 2020)
- Issue: 3
- House: Lippe
- Father: Philipp-Ernst, Prince of Schaumburg-Lippe
- Mother: Baroness Eva-Benita von Tiele-Winckler

Alexander, Prince of Schaumburg-Lippe (Ernst August Alexander Christian Viktor Hubert; born 25 December 1958) is the head of the House of Schaumburg-Lippe.

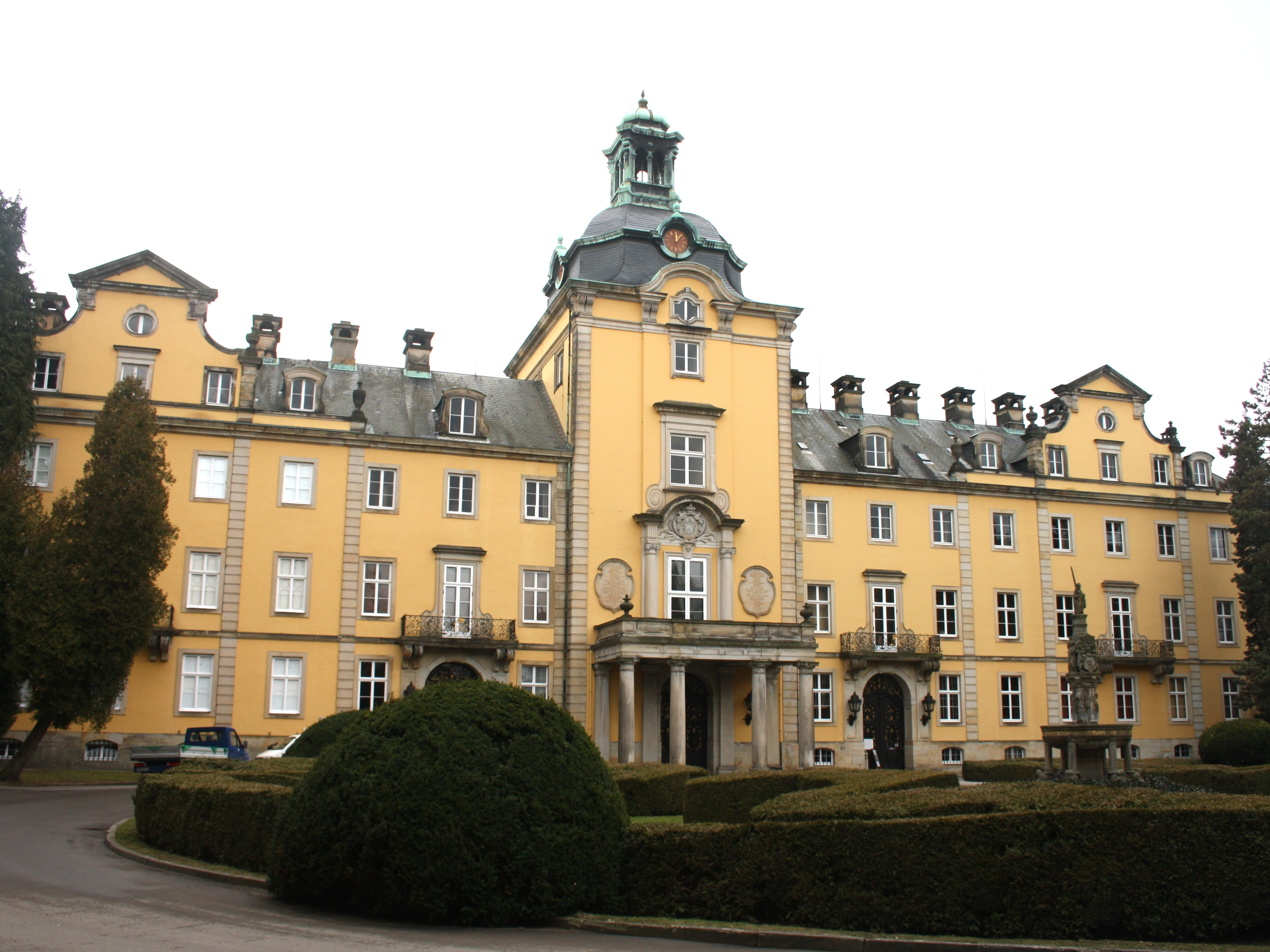
Bückeburg Palace

== Biography ==
He was born in Düsseldorf, the second son of Philipp-Ernst, Prince of Schaumburg-Lippe (1928-2003) and his wife Baroness Eva-Benita von Tiele-Winckler (1927-2013). At the time of the death of his grandfather, Prince Wolrad in 1962, Alexander was unlikely to succeed to the headship of the princely house. However following the death of his older brother Hereditary Prince Georg-Wilhelm in a motorcycle accident on 31 July 1983, Alexander became the heir apparent and new Hereditary Prince. He succeeded as head of the princely house following his father's death on 28 August 2003.

He studied law at Göttingen and moved into Bückeburg Palace upon his succession, managing the properties of the House. He is also known as a devoted jazz pianist, and has occasionally given concerts together with his friend Karl Friedrich, Prince of Hohenzollern, a saxophonist.

== Marriage and children ==
Alexander married Princess Marie Luise "Lilly" of Sayn-Wittgenstein-Berleburg (born 25 September 1972), daughter of Prince Otto Ludwig of Sayn-Wittgenstein-Berleburg and Baroness Annette von Cramm, at Bückeburg on 27 August 1993; they had one son before divorcing in 2002.

Alexander married Nadja Anna Zsoeks (born 20 February 1975) civilly at the Bückeburg City Hall on 28 June 2007 and religiously at the Lutheran Bückeburg Town Church two days later, on 30 June. They officially announced that they had separated on 27 March 2015. Before their divorce in June 2018, the couple had two daughters.

At Bückeburg Palace, the family seat, Alexander married Iranian pianist Mahkameh Navabi (born 18 March 1981) on 12 September 2020, in a small gathering due to the health measures relating to the COVID-19 pandemic, and religiously at the Bückeburg Town Church on 9 October 2021.

Alexander, Prince of Schaumburg-Lippe House of Lippe Born: 25 December 1958
Titles in pretence
Preceded by Prince Philipp-Ernst	— TITULAR — Prince of Schaumburg-Lippe; 28 August 2003 – present Reason for succession failure: Monarchy abolished in 1918	Incumbent; Heir: Heinrich-Donatus
