= Schaumburg Castle, Lower Saxony =

Coordinates: 52.2011°N 9.2009°E

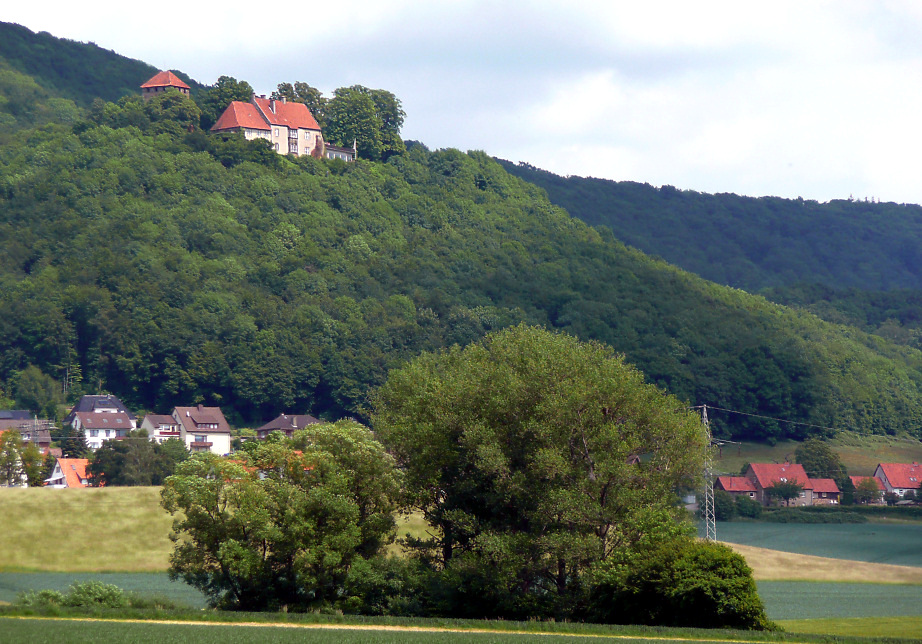
Schaumburg Castle as seen from below in 2009

Schaumburg Castle (German: Burg Schaumburg) is a castle in the town of Rinteln in the district of Schaumburg in Lower Saxony, Germany. It is owned by the former ruling family of Schaumburg-Lippe.

== History ==
The castle became the property of the Hohenzollerns when Adolphus I, Prince of Schaumburg-Lippe sided with the Austrians in the 1866 Austro-Prussian War.

However, in 1907, Emperor Wilhelm II returned Schaumburg Castle to George, Prince of Schaumburg-Lippe on the occasion of his silver wedding anniversary. The gift was also meant to be in recognition of Georg's support in the dispute over the succession to the throne of Lippe-Detmold. The castle was until recently owned by the Head of the House, Alexander, Prince of Schaumburg-Lippe. In 2022 The Schaumburg Castle was acquired from the Prince Schaumburg Lippe by the entrepreneur Pieter Haitsma Mulier and his wife Vanessa Princess zu Sayn-Wittgenstein Berleburg, an immediate family member.
