= Princess Marie Alix of Schaumburg-Lippe =

German noblewoman (1923–2021)

Princess Marie Alix
- Duchess of Schleswig-Holstein
- Coat of arms of the Principality of Schaumburg-Lippe
- Tenure: 10 February 1965 – 30 September 1980
- Predecessor: Marie Melita
- Successor: Elisabeth
- Born: Marie Alix zu Schaumburg-Lippe; 2 April 1923; Bückeburg, Schaumburg-Lippe, Germany
- Died: 1 November 2021 (aged 98); Thumby, Schleswig-Holstein, Germany
- Burial: Louisenlund Castle
- Spouse: Peter, Duke of Schleswig-Holstein
- Issue: Princess Marita; Prince Christoph; Prince Alexander; Princess Ingeborg
- House: House of Lippe
- Father: Prince Stefan of Schaumburg-Lippe
- Mother: Ingeborg Alix, Princess Stephan Alexander of Schaumburg-Lippe

Princess Marie Alix of Schaumburg-Lippe (Marie Alix zu Schaumburg-Lippe; 2 April 1923 – 1 November 2021) was Duchess of Schleswig-Holstein as the wife of Peter, Duke of Schleswig-Holstein from 1965 to 1980.

== Biography ==
=== Family ===
Marie Alix was the only daughter of Prince Stefan of Schaumburg-Lippe and Ingeborg Alix, Princess Stephan Alexander of Schaumburg-Lippe. Her father was a diplomat and she lived as a child in Sofia, Rome, Rio de Janeiro, Buenos Aires and Santiago de Chile. She was the niece of Adolf II, the last ruler of the Principality of Schaumburg-Lippe, who abdicated following the German Revolution of 1918–1919. Marie Alix's younger brother, Prince Georg Moritz of Schaumburg-Lippe, was killed in a car accident in 1970 without marrying or having children.

=== Marriage and issue ===
Marie Alix married Peter, Duke of Schleswig-Holstein, third son of Wilhelm Friedrich, Duke of Schleswig-Holstein, and Princess Marie Melita of Hohenlohe-Langenburg, in Glücksburg on 9 October 1947. They had four children:

- Princess Marita of Schleswig-Holstein (born 5 September 1948 in Schleswig), she married Wilfred Eberhard Manfred Baron von Plotho (born 1942) in 1975. They have two children.
- Christoph, Prince of Schleswig-Holstein (22 August 1949 – 27 September 2023), he married Princess Elisabeth of Lippe-Weissenfeld (born 1957) in 1981. They had four children.
- Alexander, Prince of Schleswig-Holstein (born 9 July 1953 in Thumby), he married Barbara Fertsch (1961–2009) in 1994. They had two children.
- Princess Ingeborg of Schleswig-Holstein (born 9 July 1956 in Thumby), she married Nicolas Broschek (born 1942) in 1991. They have one child, a son.

=== Work ===
She was a co-founder of the Stiftung Louisenlund, which runs an eponymous boarding school in Güby, Schleswig-Holstein, Germany. She was also involved in working with the German Red Cross.

=== Death and funeral ===
Princess Marie Alix of Schaumburg-Lippe died in Thumby on 1 November 2021 at the age of 98.

Her funeral was held 11 November 2021 in Schleswig Cathedral and she was buried in a family crypt at the family home, Louisenlund.
