= George, Prince of Schaumburg-Lippe =

George
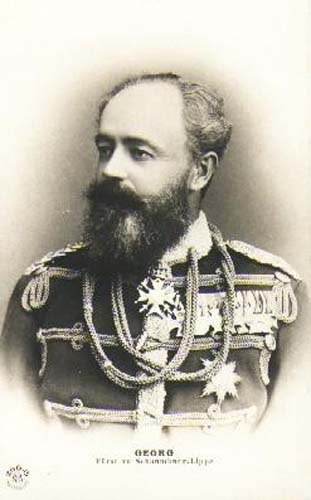
- Prince George, c. 1893–1911

Prince of Schaumburg-Lippe
- Reign: 8 May 1893 – 29 April 1911
- Predecessor: Adolf I
- Successor: Adolf II
- Born: 10 October 1846; Schloss Bückeburg, Bückeburg, Schaumburg-Lippe
- Died: 29 April 1911 (aged 64)
- Spouse: Princess Marie Anne of Saxe-Altenburg (m. 1882)
- Issue Detail: Adolf II; Prince Wolrad; Prince Friedrich Christian
Names
- Stephan Albrecht Georg
- House: House of Lippe
- Father: Adolphus I, Prince of Schaumburg-Lippe
- Mother: Princess Hermine of Waldeck and Pyrmont

George, Prince of Schaumburg-Lippe (10 October 1846 – 29 April 1911) was the ruler of the small Principality of Schaumburg-Lippe within the German Empire from 1893 to 1911, succeeding his father Adolf I, and being succeeded by his son Adolf II.

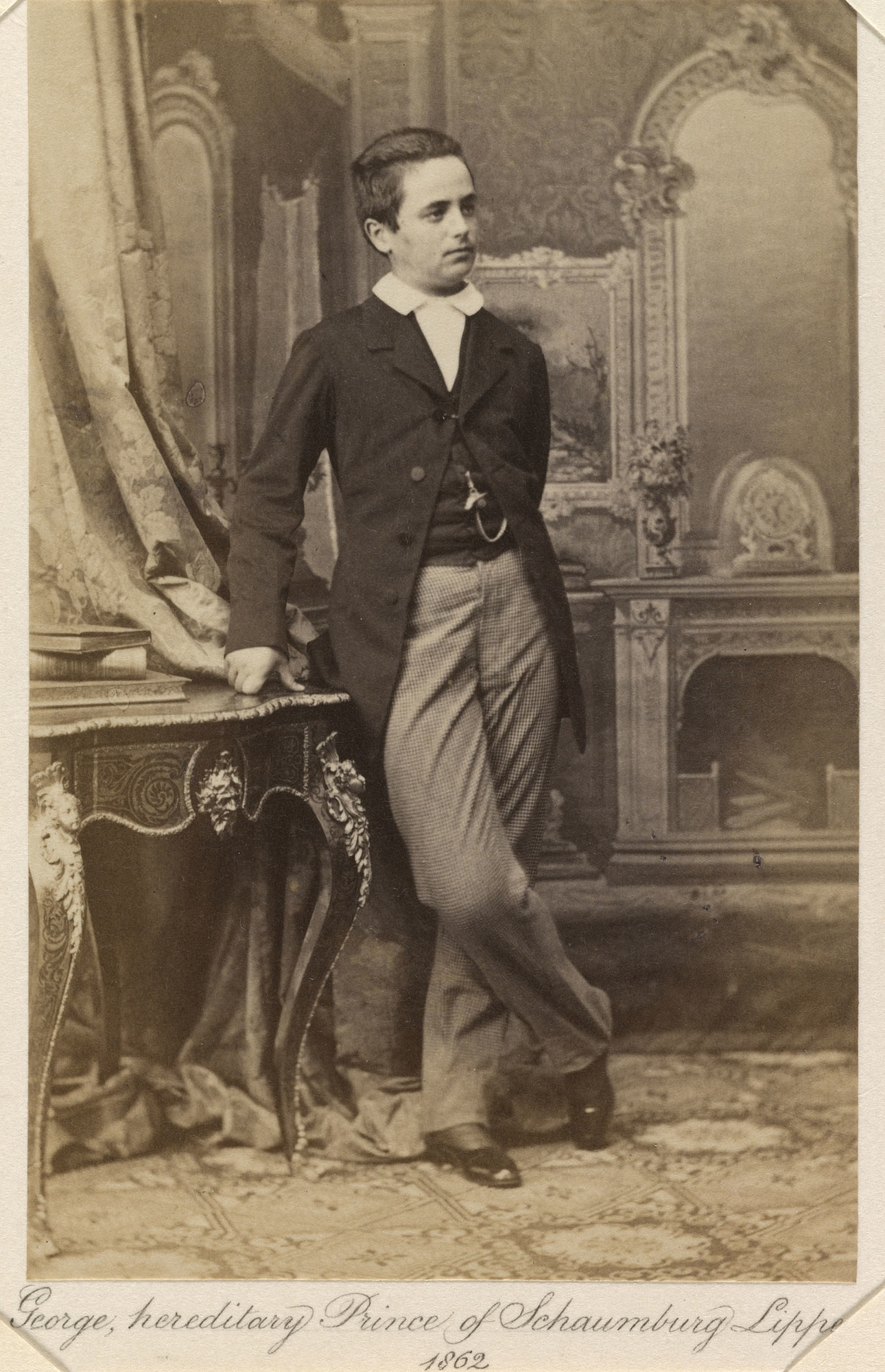
George in 1862 at 16 years old

== Biography ==
Stephan Albrecht Georg was born at Bückeburg Castle, in Bückeburg, Principality of Schaumburg-Lippe as the eldest of four sons to Adolphus I, Prince of Schaumburg-Lippe and Princess Hermine of Waldeck and Pyrmont. George had seven siblings, but only five of them survived childhood.

He succeeded as Prince of Schaumburg-Lippe on the death of his father on 8 May 1893 and reigned until his death on 29 April 1911 at Bückeburg and was succeeded by his son who became Adolphus II.

== Family ==
George was married on 16 April 1882 at Altenburg to Princess Marie Anne of Saxe-Altenburg, a daughter of Prince Maurice of Saxe-Altenburg.

They had nine children:

- Prince Adolf II (1883–1936)
- Prince Moritz Georg (1884–1920)
- Prince Peter (1886–1886)
- Prince Wolrad (1887–1962)
- Prince Stephan (1891–1965), who was the father of Princess Marie Alix of Schaumburg-Lippe
- Prince Heinrich (1894–1952)
- Princess Margaretha (1896–1897)
- Prince Friedrich Christian (1906–1983)
- Princess Elisabeth (1908–1933)

=== Silver wedding anniversary ===
On the occasion of their silver wedding anniversary in 1907, Emperor Wilhelm II presented to Georg and Marie Anne the family ancestral seat, Schaumburg Castle. The castle had been controlled by the Hohenzollerns ever since Georg's father sided with the Austrians in the 1866 Austro-Prussian War. The gift was also meant to be in recognition of Georg's support in the dispute over the succession to the Lippe-Detmold throne.

== Orders and decorations ==
- Kingdom of Prussia:
  - Knight of the Order of the Red Eagle, 1st Class, 8 January 1867
  - Knight of Honour of the Johanniter Order, 27 July 1884
  - Knight of the Order of the Black Eagle, 6 January 1894; with Collar, 17 January 1894
- Württemberg: Grand Cross of the Order of the Württemberg Crown, 1872
- Baden:
  - Knight of the House Order of Fidelity, 1893
  - Knight of the Order of Berthold the First, 1893
- Kingdom of Bavaria: Knight of the Royal Order of Saint Hubert, 1893
- Kingdom of Saxony: Knight of the Order of the Rue Crown, 1895
- Denmark: Knight of the Order of the Elephant, 5 May 1896
- (Austrian Empire) (Kingdom of Hungary) Austria-Hungary: Grand Cross of the Royal Hungarian Order of St. Stephen, 1899

== Ancestry ==
Ancestors of George, Prince of Schaumburg-Lippe

8. Philip II, Count of Schaumburg-Lippe
4. George William, Prince of Schaumburg-Lippe
9. Landgravine Juliane of Hesse-Philippsthal
2. Adolf I, Prince of Schaumburg-Lippe
10. George I, Prince of Waldeck and Pyrmont
5. Princess Ida of Waldeck and Pyrmont
11. Princess Augusta of Schwarzburg-Sondershausen
1. Georg, Prince of Schaumburg-Lippe
12. George I, Prince of Waldeck and Pyrmont ( = 10)
6. George II, Prince of Waldeck and Pyrmont
13. Princess Augusta of Schwarzburg-Sondershausen (= 11)
3. Princess Hermine of Waldeck and Pyrmont
14. Victor II, Prince of Anhalt-Bernburg-Schaumburg-Hoym
7. Princess Emma of Anhalt-Bernburg-Schaumburg-Hoym
15. Princess Amelie of Nassau-Weilburg

George, Prince of Schaumburg-Lippe House of Lippe Born: 10 October 1846 Died: 29 April 1911
German royalty
| Preceded by Adolf I | Prince of Schaumburg-Lippe; 1893–1911 | Succeeded by Adolf II |
