= Vanessa Hegelmaier =

German fashion model (born 1987)

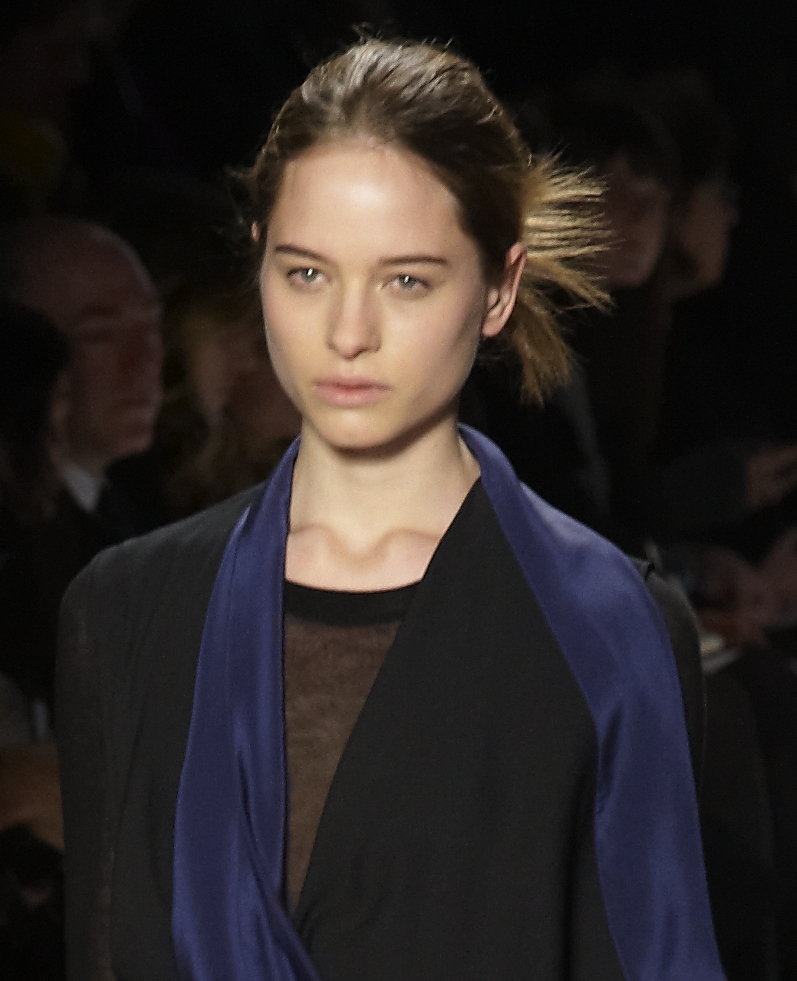
- Hegelmeier walks for BCBG Max Azria in 2010.
- Born: Anna Vanessa Hegelmaier; 18 June 1987 (age 39); Stadthagen, Lower Saxony, West Germany
- Years active: 2008–
- Modeling information
- Height: 1.80 m (5 ft 11 in)
- Hair color: Brown
- Eye color: Green/Grey
- Agency: Place Model Management; Why Not Model Agency; IMG Models New York & Paris; D Models

Anna Vanessa Hegelmaier (born 18 June 1987) is a German fashion model, who placed ninth in the third cycle of the reality television show Germany's Next Top Model after withdrawing due to a brain concussion.

== Early life ==
She was born in Stadthagen, Lower Saxony, Germany. Prior to her participation on the show in 2008 she was studying mathematics at the University of Bielefeld.

== Germany's Next Topmodel ==
Without her knowledge, friends of Hegelmaier applied for her to be on the show. She was invited to be featured in the first episode among the top 100 and was selected to be part of the final 19 in Episode 2.

Despite her quiet personality that resulted in a lack of screen time, she started to dominate the competition when she won the very first casting for Bree handbags. Later on she was also featured in an editorial in the German issue of Cosmopolitan alongside two other contestants and Heidi Klum due to a challenge win.

In the beginning of episode 9 the remaining nine finalists where about to fly to Australia when it was announced that Hegelmaier would not be able to attend the flight due to a brain concussion. That incident took place at her home where she was staying during a break of taping for the show. One episode later, she withdrew from the competition for good placing 9th overall.

She later stated that she did not regret her participation on the show but had no intention of winning.

== Career ==
After GNTM Hegelmaier returned to study before getting signed with Place Models Management in Hamburg in 2009 which is her mother agency since then. She is currently signed with IMG Models in New York City and Paris, Why Not Model Agency in Milan and D Models in Athens.

She made her runway debut during Spring/Summer 2010 shows in New York, London, Milan, and Paris walking for more than 20 different labels. During the next season she walked 30 shows, among them the presentations of Missoni, Dolce & Gabbana, and Louis Vuitton.

She walked for Moschino, Jonathan Saunders, Missoni, Alberta Ferretti, BCBG Max Azria, Christopher Kane, Topshop Unique and others.

Her print work includes editorials for international issues of Amica, Vogue, V, Elle, and Cosmopolitan.

She was booked for campaigns by labels such as Bogner Jeans, Bree, DKNY, DKNY WATCH and Escada Sport.
