= Albert Wolfgang, Count of Schaumburg-Lippe =

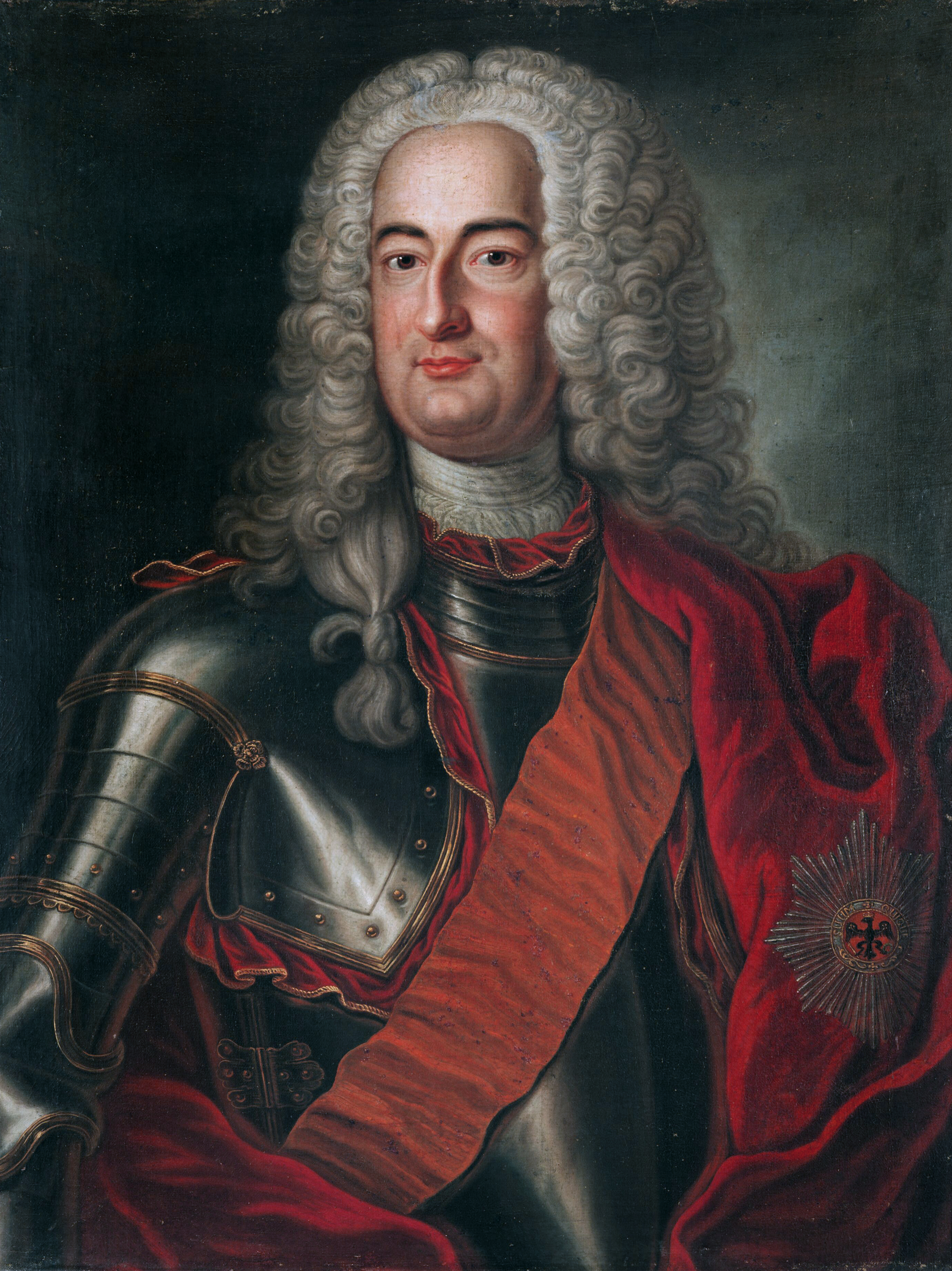
Albert Wolfgang, Count of Schaumburg-Lippe

Albrecht Wolfgang, Count of Schaumburg-Lippe (27 April 1699 – 24 September 1748) was a ruler of the County of Schaumburg-Lippe.

== Biography ==
He was born in Bückeburg the son of Friedrich Christian, Count of Schaumburg-Lippe and his first wife, Countess Johanna Sophia of Hohenlohe-Langenburg (1673–1743). He succeeded his father as Count on 13 June 1728. In 1743, he joined Maria Theresa of Austria and Schaumburg-Lippe led during the War of the Austrian Succession. He died at Bückeburg and was succeeded as Count by his son Wilhelm.

== Marriages and children ==
He was married firstly to Countess Margarete Gertrud of Oeynhausen (1701–1726), an illegitimate daughter of George I of Great Britain and his mistress Melusine von der Schulenburg, Duchess of Kendal, on 30 October 1721 at London. They had two children:

- Count Georg Wilhelm (1722–1742), killed in a duel at age 20
- Count William (1724–1777)

He was married secondly to Princess Charlotte of Nassau-Siegen (1702–1785) on 26 April 1730 at Varel. She was the eldest daughter of Frederick William Adolf, Prince of Nassau-Siegen and his wife, Landgravine Elisabeth Juliana Francisca of Hesse-Homburg.

He had one legitimate son

- Johann Christoph

at least two illegitimate sons:

- August Wolfrath von Campen (1730-1779), who married Countess Wilhelmine von Anhalt, morganatic daughter of Prince William Gustav of Anhalt-Dessau
  - Wolfradine von Campen (1773-1794), married Count Adolf Friedrich Werner von der Schulenburg (1759-1825)
- Karl Wilhelm Wolfgang von Donop (1740-1813), illegitimate son with Charlotte Sophie of Aldenburg
  - Georg von Donop.

Albert Wolfgang, Count of Schaumburg-Lippe House of Lippe Born: 27 April 1699 Died: 24 September 1748
Regnal titles
Preceded by Friedrich Christian	Count of Schaumburg-Lippe; 1728–1748	Succeeded by Wilhelm
