= Frederick Christian, Count of Schaumburg-Lippe =

Count of Schaumburg-Lippe (1681-1728)

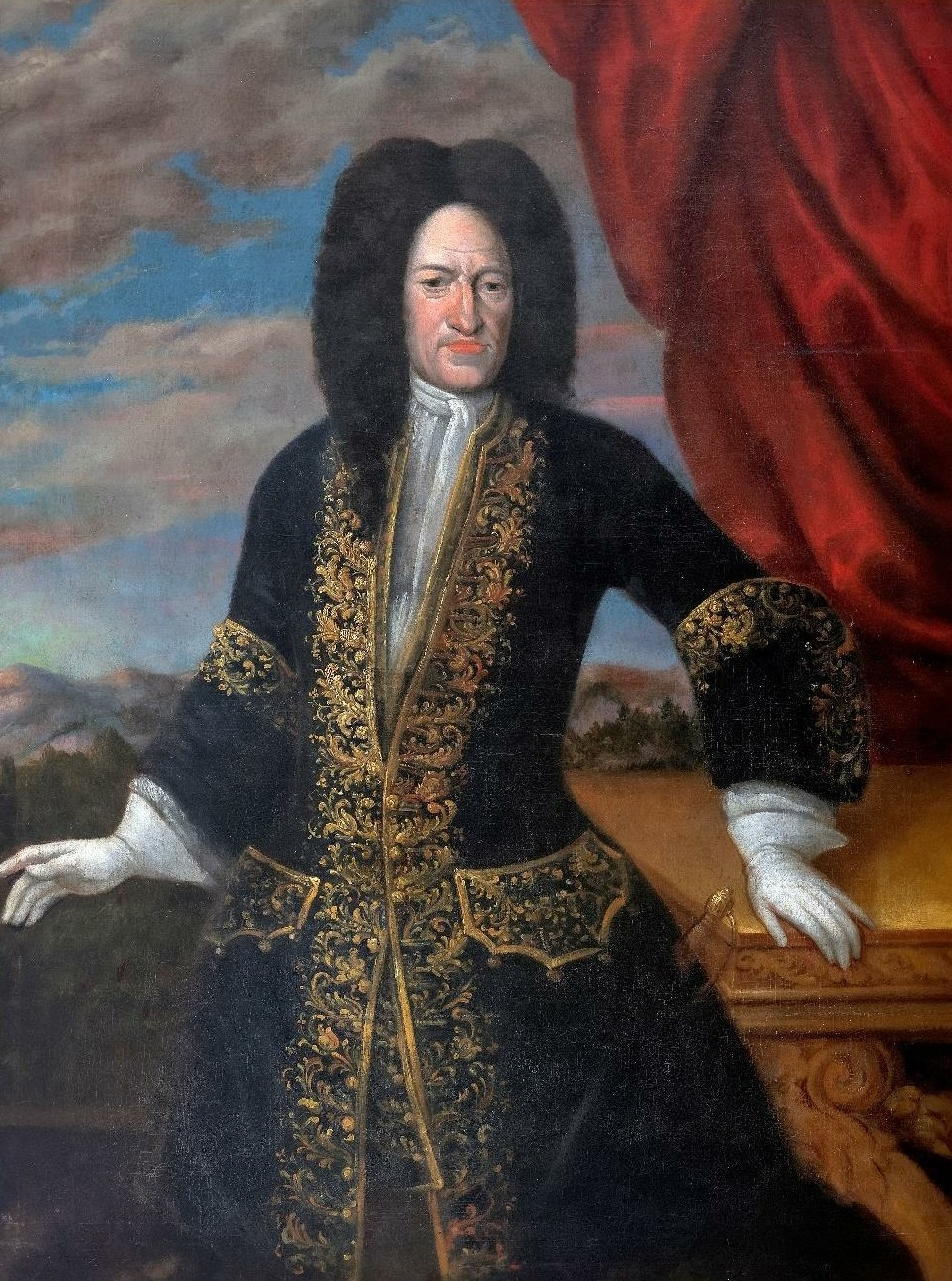
Friedrich Christian, Count of Schaumburg-Lippe

Friedrich Christian, Count of Schaumburg-Lippe (16 August 1655 – 13 June 1728) was the second ruler of the County of Schaumburg-Lippe.

== Biography ==
He was born in Bückeburg, the son of Philip I, Count of Schaumburg-Lippe and Landgravine Sophie of Hesse-Kassel (or Hesse-Cassel) (1615–1670).

He became Count on his father's death on 10 April 1681, and reigned until his death at Bückeburg. He was succeeded by his elder surviving son Albert Wolfgang.

== Marriage and children ==
He was married on 4 January 1691 at Langenburg to Countess Johanna Sophia of Hohenlohe-Langenburg (1673–1743). They divorced in 1723. They had six children:

- Count Friedrich August (1693–1694)
- Count Wilhelm Ludwig (1695–1695)
- Countess Sophie Charlotte (1696–1697)
- Count Philipp (1698–1698)
- Count Albert Wolfgang (1699–1748)
- Count Friedrich (1702–1776)

On 3 December 1725 at Brixen, he subsequently married his mistress, Maria Anna Victoria von Gall (1707–1760), daughter of Johann Michael von Gall and his wife, Maria Anna von Enzenberg.

Frederick Christian, Count of Schaumburg-Lippe House of Lippe Born: 16 August 1655 Died: 13 June 1728
Regnal titles
Preceded by Philipp I	Count of Schaumburg-Lippe; 1681–1728	Succeeded by Albrecht Wolfgang
