= Georg von Donop =

German statesman and historian

Georg Karl Wilhelm Philipp, Baron von Donop (18 March 1767 – 18 August 1845) was a German statesman and historian.

Von Donop was born in Sonneberg into a noble family from Hesse-Kassel. He was the eldest of six sons born to Baron Karl Wilhelm Wolfgang von Donop (1740-1813), an illegitimate son of Charlotte Sophie of Aldenburg and Albert Wolfgang, Count of Schaumburg-Lippe. and his mother was born von Tilemann.

Members of the von Donop clan were prominent in state and military matters and included Colonel Carl von Donop (1732–1777), who fought in the American Revolutionary War. The von Donops married into prominent families in France and Great Britain. Wilhelm Heinrich Baron von Donop married Frances Mary, eldest daughter of Sir Edward Hamilton, 1st Baronet, in 1831.

His British relatives included Pelham George von Donop (1851–1921), Chief Inspector of Railways, and Sir Stanley von Donop (1860–1941), a soldier who became Master-General of the Ordnance.

He inherited a significant coin collection from his grandmother Charlotte and was a writer on the subject.

== Bibliography ==
- Das Magusanische Europa, four volumes
- Les Médailles Gallo-Gaëliques. Description of the trouvaille de l'Ile de Jersey: Avec XXXII planches, 1838.
