= Wolrad, Prince of Schaumburg-Lippe =

Ernst Wolrad
- Prince of Schaumburg-Lippe
- Wolrad in 1915

Head of the House Schaumburg-Lippe
- Reign: 26 March 1936 – 15 June 1962
- Predecessor: Adolf II, Prince of Schaumburg-Lippe
- Successor: Philipp-Ernst, Prince of Schaumburg-Lippe
- Born: 19 April 1887; Stadthagen, Schaumburg-Lippe
- Died: 15 June 1962 (aged 75); Hanover
- Spouse: Princess Bathildis of Schaumburg-Lippe (m. 1925)
- Issue: Georg-Wilhelm, Hereditary Prince of Schaumburg-Lippe; Philipp-Ernst, Prince of Schaumburg-Lippe; Prince Konstantin; Princess Viktoria Luise
Names
- Ernst Wolrad
- House: Schaumburg-Lippe
- Father: Georg, Prince of Schaumburg-Lippe
- Mother: Princess Marie Anne of Saxe-Altenburg

Ernst Wolrad, Prince of Schaumburg-Lippe (19 April 1887 – 15 June 1962) was head of the Princely House of Schaumburg-Lippe.

== Biography ==
He was born at Stadthagen, the fourth son of Georg, Prince of Schaumburg-Lippe and his wife, Princess Marie Anne of Saxe-Altenburg. He succeeded his brother Prince Adolf II as head of the Princely House following his death in a plane crash in Mexico on 26 March 1936. Following his death at Hanover, he was succeeded as head of the Princely House by his second son, Philipp-Ernst.

== Marriage and children ==
He was married at Simbach am Inn in April 1925 to his second cousin, Princess Bathildis of Schaumburg-Lippe, only daughter of Prince Albert of Schaumburg-Lippe and Duchess Elsa of Württemberg. They had four children:

- Adolf Friedrich Georg-Wilhelm Wolrad Hans-Werner, Hereditary Prince of Schaumburg-Lippe (1926–1945)
- Friedrich August Philipp-Ernst Wolrad, Prince of Schaumburg-Lippe (1928–2003)
- Prince Konstantin Karl-Eduard Ernst-August Stephan Alexander of Schaumburg-Lippe (1930-2008)
- Princess Elsa Viktoria Luise Marie Barbara Elisabeth Bathildis Wera of Schaumburg-Lippe (1940)

== Ancestry ==
Ancestors of Wolrad, Prince of Schaumburg-Lippe

Georg Wilhelm, Prince of Schaumburg-Lippe
Adolf I, Prince of Schaumburg-Lippe
Princess Ida of Waldeck and Pyrmont
Georg, Prince of Schaumburg-Lippe
George II, Prince of Waldeck and Pyrmont
Princess Hermine of Waldeck-Pyrmont
Princess Emma of Anhalt-Bernburg-Schaumburg-Hoym
Wolrad, Prince of Schaumburg-Lippe
Georg, Duke of Saxe-Altenburg
Prince Moritz of Saxe-Altenburg
Marie Luise of Mecklenburg-Schwerin
Princess Marie Anne of Saxe-Altenburg
Bernhard II, Duke of Saxe-Meiningen
Princess Augusta of Saxe-Meiningen
Princess Marie Frederica of Hesse-Kassel

Wolrad, Prince of Schaumburg-Lippe House of Lippe Born: 19 April 1887 Died: 15 June 1962
Titles in pretence
Preceded by Prince Adolf II	— TITULAR — Prince of Schaumburg-Lippe; 1936–1962	Succeeded by Prince Philipp-Ernst
