= Stanley von Donop =

British Army general

Major-General Sir Stanley von Donop KCB KCMG
- Born: 22 February 1860; Bath, Somerset
- Died: 17 October 1941 (aged 81); Bath, Somerset
- Relatives: P. G. von Donop (brother)
- Military career
- Allegiance: United Kingdom
- Branch: British Army
- Rank: Major-General
- Conflicts: Second Boer War; First World War
- Awards: Knight Commander of the Order of the Bath; Knight Commander of the Order of St Michael and St George; Mentioned in Despatches

Major-General Sir Stanley Brenton von Donop, KCB, KCMG (22 February 1860 – 17 October 1941), was a British Army officer who served as master-general of the Ordnance from 1913 to 1916.

== Early life and education ==
Donop was born in Bath, Somerset, the youngest of four sons of Vice Admiral Edward von Donop and his wife, Louisa Mary Diana Brenton. His eldest brother was P. G. von Donop, and his grandfather was the German official and historian Georg von Donop, an illegitimate grandson of Charlotte Sophie of Aldenburg. He was educated at Wimbledon College and at the Royal Somersetshire College at Bath before attending the Royal Military Academy, Woolwich.

== Military career ==
Donop was commissioned into the Royal Garrison Artillery as a lieutenant on 18 January 1880, was promoted to captain on 1 April 1888, and was promoted to major on 9 October 1897. He was a professor at the Royal Military Academy until early 1900, when he resigned for active service in South Africa during the Second Boer War. In November 1900 he was appointed commanding officer of Lord Methuen's Composite Regiment of Australian Bushmen, with the local rank (in South Africa) of lieutenant colonel. He led an important action at Kleinfontein the following year. For his service in the war, he was mentioned in despatches (dated 8 April 1902) and received a brevet promotion to lieutenant colonel in the South Africa honours list published on 26 June 1902.

After his return to the United Kingdom, von Donop was on 18 April 1903 appointed assistant superintendent of experiments at the Royal Artillery School of Gunnery at Shoeburyness. In April 1904 he was appointed secretary of the Ordnance Committee and in January 1907 was promoted to lieutenant colonel. In 1908, Donop was appointed chief instructor at the School of Gunnery.

In October 1910 he relinquished this assignment when he was made an assistant director at the War Office in London. In February 1911, he was promoted to the temporary rank of brigadier general and appointed director of artillery at the War Office, in the place of W. E. Blewitt.

Donop had a key role in the First World War, having been appointed master-general of the Ordnance in 1913. He was promoted to major general in October 1914. He ordered 6-inch howitzers, which were the main instrument for the bombardments on the Western Front. He was also colonel commandant of the Royal Artillery.

== Personality ==
Donop is described by a modern writer as being competent and hardworking, but as having a cold manner and showing a "barely concealed contempt for politicians". During the First World War, these characteristics made him disliked by civilian colleagues who did not share his technical expertise, especially Prime Minister David Lloyd George.

Military offices
| Preceded by Sir Charles Hadden | Master-General of the Ordnance; 1913–1916 | Succeeded by Sir William Furse |
