= Adolf II of Schaumburg-Lippe =

Adolf II
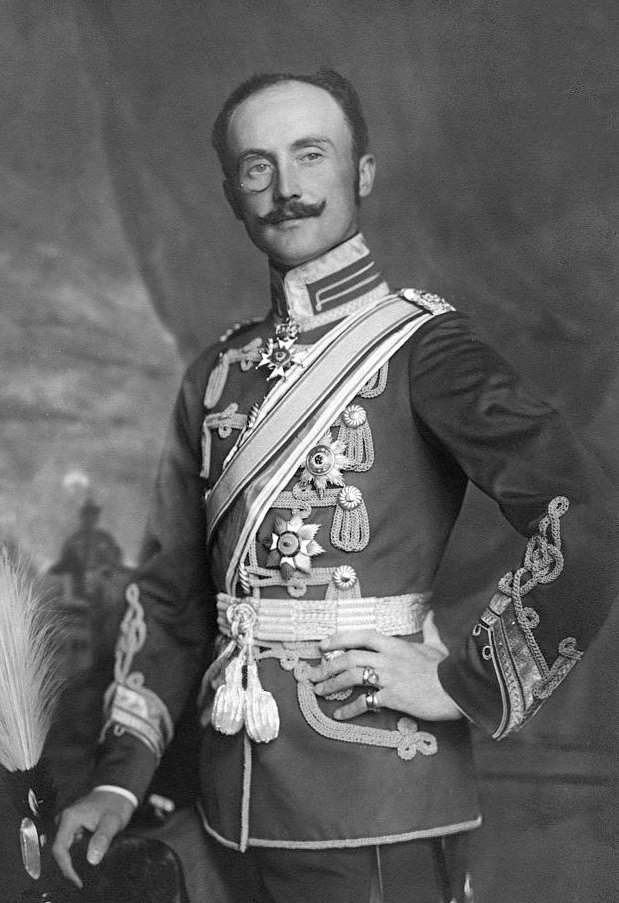
- Portrait circa 1917

Prince of Schaumburg-Lippe
- Reign: 29 April 1911 – 15 November 1918
- Predecessor: George
- Successor: Monarchy abolished
- Born: 23 February 1883; Stadthagen, Schaumburg-Lippe
- Died: 26 March 1936 (aged 53); Zumpango, Mexico (plane crash)
- Spouse: Ellen Bischoff-Korthaus (m. 1920)
Names
- Adolf Bernhard
- House: Schaumburg-Lippe
- Father: Prince Georg
- Mother: Princess Marie Anne of Saxe-Altenburg

Adolf II (23 February 1883 – 26 March 1936) was the last ruler of the small Principality of Schaumburg-Lippe in northwestern Germany from 29 April 1911 until his abdication on 15 November 1918.

Adolf was the eldest son of Georg, Prince of Schaumburg-Lippe, and succeeded his father as prince on 29 April 1911. His short reign came to an end seven years later when he was forced to abdicate on 15 November 1918 following the German revolution. He and his wife were both killed in a plane crash in Mexico on 26 March 1936.

== Biography ==
=== Early life ===
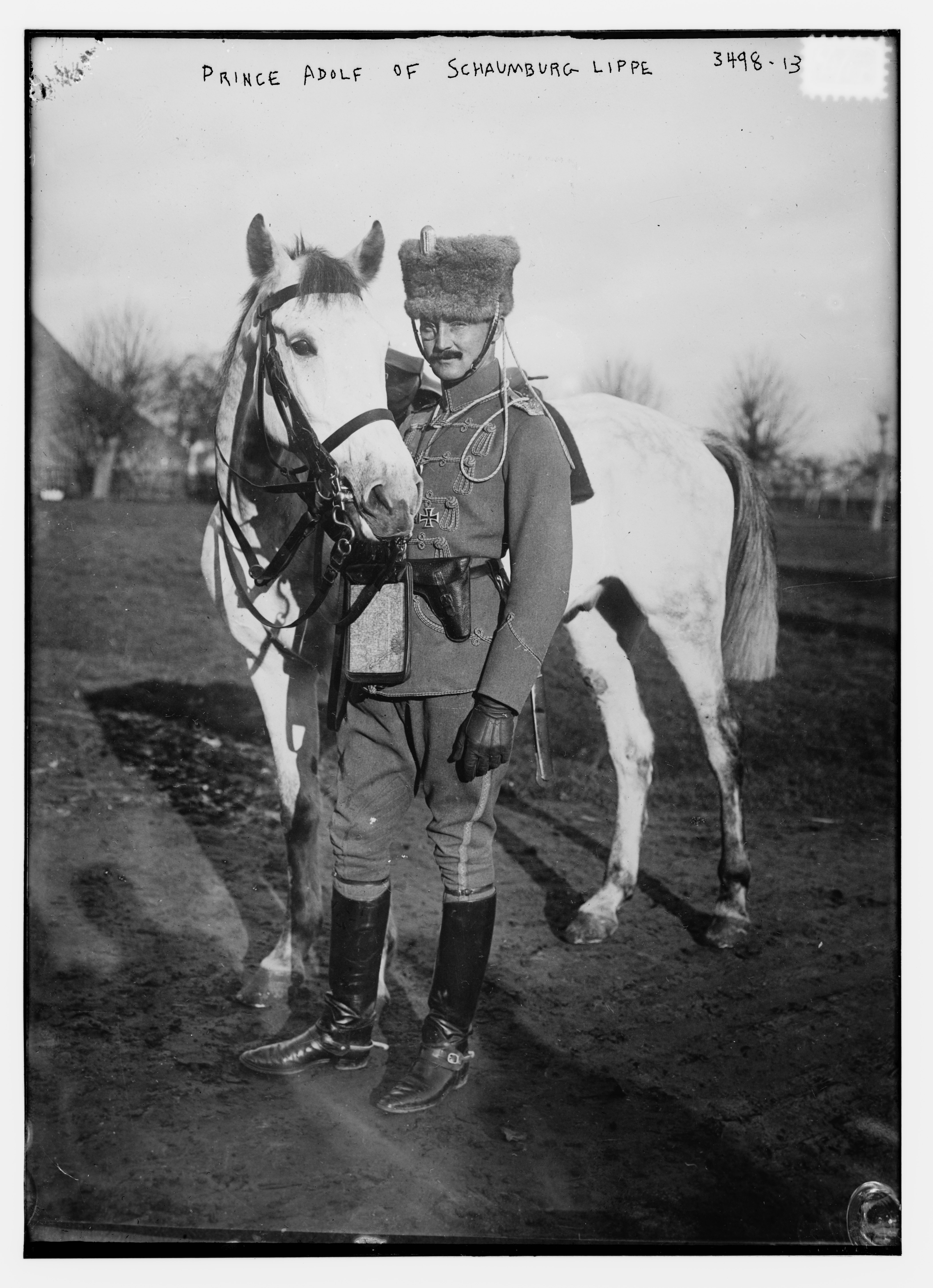
Adolf as Hereditary Prince in 1910.

Adolf was born in Stadthagen, the only other town in the principality apart from the capital Bückeburg, to the then hereditary Prince Georg (1846–1911) and Princess Marie Anne of Saxe-Altenburg (1864–1918). He was born during the reign of his grandfather Prince Adolf I, and became heir apparent to Schaumburg-Lippe at the age of 10 on 8 May 1893 following the death of his grandfather, and the accession of his father. In 1904, while studying at the University of Bonn, he became a member of the German Student Corps Corps Borussia Bonn.

=== Reign ===
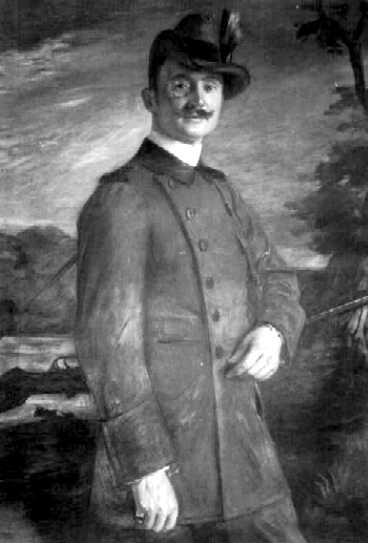
Prince Adolf II in hunting attire.

Upon the death of Prince George on 29 April 1911, Adolf succeeded his father as prince of Schaumburg-Lippe at the age of 28. During his reign he developed the spa of Bad Eilsen and was responsible for many buildings there.

He was forced to abdicate on 15 November 1918 following the German revolution: the principality became the Free State of Schaumburg-Lippe. Adolf was exiled to Brioni in Istria.

=== Marriage and death ===
Adolf married the actress Elisabeth Franziska (Ellen) Bischoff-Korthaus (1894–1936) on 10 January 1920 in Berlin. Ellen had previously been married (from 1918 to 1919) to Prince Eberwyn of Bentheim and Steinfurt (1882–1949), eldest son of Alexis, Prince of Bentheim and Steinfurt.

They were both killed in a plane crash in Zumpango, Mexico, on 26 March 1936, while flying from Mexico City to Guatemala City in a Ford Trimotor airplane. The New York Times from 27 March 1936 reported that it was the worst Mexican air crash. All fourteen people on board the airplane, ten tourists from Europe and four crew members, died when the plane crashed between two volcanos.

Adolf's youngest brother Friedrich Christian, who served as an adjutant to Joseph Goebbels, spoke out against letting Ellen be buried in Bückeburg Mausoleum next to her husband, because she was not of "Aryan origin".

As he had no children, Adolf was succeeded as head of the House of Schaumburg-Lippe by his younger brother Prince Wolrad.

== Ancestry ==
Ancestors of Adolf II of Schaumburg-Lippe

8. George William, Prince of Schaumburg-Lippe
4. Adolf I, Prince of Schaumburg-Lippe
9. Princess Ida of Waldeck and Pyrmont
2. Georg, Prince of Schaumburg-Lippe
10. George II, Prince of Waldeck and Pyrmont
5. Hermine of Waldeck and Pyrmont
11. Emma of Anhalt-Bernburg-Schaumburg-Hoym
1. Adolf II, Prince of Schaumburg-Lippe
12. Georg, Duke of Saxe-Altenburg
6. Prince Moritz of Saxe-Altenburg
13. Marie Louise of Mecklenburg-Schwerin
3. Princess Marie Anne of Saxe-Altenburg
14. Bernhard II, Duke of Saxe-Meiningen
7. Princess Augusta of Saxe-Meiningen
15. Princess Marie Frederica of Hesse-Kassel

Adolf II of Schaumburg-Lippe House of Lippe Born: February 23 1883 Died: March 26 1936
German royalty
Preceded by Georg	Prince of Schaumburg-Lippe; 1911–1918	Monarchy abolished
Titles in pretence
Monarchy abolished	— TITULAR — Prince of Schaumburg-Lippe; 1918–1936	Succeeded by Wolrad
