= Stadthagen =

- Town
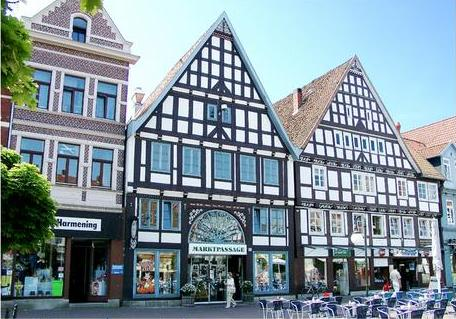
- Market square. The photo shows the entrance to the Marktpassage, an indoor shopping arcade.

- Coat of arms

- Location of Stadthagen within Schaumburg district
- Interactive map of Stadthagen
- Location within Germany Location within Lower Saxony
- Coordinates: 52°19′29″N 9°12′25″E
- Country: Germany
- State: Lower Saxony
- District: Schaumburg

Government
  - Mayor (2021–26): Oliver Theiß (Ind.)

Area
  - Total: 60.27 km^{2} (23.27 sq mi)
- Elevation: 72 m (236 ft)

Population (2025-12-31)
  - Total: 22,556
  - Density: 374.2/km^{2} (969.3/sq mi)
- Time zone: UTC+01:00 (CET)
  - Summer (DST): UTC+02:00 (CEST)
- Postal codes: 31655
- Dialling codes: 05721
- Vehicle registration: SHG
- Website: www.stadthagen.de

Stadthagen (German pronunciation: [ʃtatˈhaːɡn̩]) is the capital of the district of Schaumburg, in Lower Saxony, Germany. It is situated approximately 20 km east of Minden and 40 km west of Hanover. The city consists of the districts Brandenburg, Enzen-Hobbensen, Hörkamp-Langenbruch, Krebshagen, Obernwöhren, Probsthagen, Reinsen and Wendthagen-Ehlen. Earlier, there were also the districts Habichhorst, Bruchhof, Blyinghausen, Enzen and Hobbensen.

Stadthagen is located on the German Timber-Frame Road.

== History ==
Count Adolf III of Holstein created a new settlement at the foot of the Bückeberg around 1224. Its site near the Hellweg route testifies to his strategic and commercial wisdom. After the successful clearances of the Dülwald forest around 1224, a new settlement by the name of indago comitis (the count's enclosure - the same name as The Hague) was first recorded in 1244 when it was described as a city and fort. In 1287 the town changed its name to Grevenalveshagen (Count Adolf's enclosure) and it finally acquired its current name of Stadthagen in 1378. Further highlights of the town's early history are the acquisition of the town seal in 1320 and the bestowal of the privileges of a town in 1344.

Around 1400 stone fortifications were erected. The surviving remnants of these include the tower at the Cattle Market, a small tower at the Castle, and sections of the town wall.

In 1501 coal mining began nearby, and lasted until 1961.

In 1559 the resident Count Otto IV introduced the Lutheran denomination. His predecessor Count Adolf XI had commissioned the current castle from architect Jörg Unkair of Tübingen. It was built between 1534 and 1538 on the site of the previous castle, and is one of the most notable examples of an Early Renaissance castle in Lower Saxony. The official entrance was built in 1553 at the then Upper Gate. In 1607 Prince Ernst of Schaumburg moved his residence from Stadthagen to Bückeburg. The year 1609 saw the erection of the count's mausoleum at the back of the St Martini church, a domed heptagon with a famous resurrection group by Adriaen de Vries. The grammar school of 1610 was elevated to the status of a university in 1620, although this soon moved to Rinteln.

About 1700, at the ducal court of Hanover, in the presence of the duke, the dowager duchess, the princes, clergy, and all the distinguished personages of the city, Landesrabbiner Joseph Stadthagen (born in Metz about 1645, died in Stadthagen in 1715), disputed against the conversionist purposes of Eliezer Edzard, who had been the instigator of the disputation. The rabbi refuted all the arguments of Edzard from Jewish Scripture and the Midrash and under full approval of the court declined to answer under oath the question as to which religion was the best: "We condemn no creed based upon the belief in the Creator of heaven and earth. We believe what we have been taught; let the Christians adhere to what they have been taught".

The first drains were installed in the Upper and Lower Streets in 1825. In 1847 the building of the Hanover–Minden railway line commenced, and the current station was built.

In 1864 the first street lighting, in the form of lanterns directed at the street, was installed. There followed gas lighting in 1899 and electric lighting in 1955.

At the end of the 19th century work commenced to change the rampart area into a park with trees.

The Free State of Schaumburg-Lippe was founded after the end of the monarchy in 1918.

As in many German towns, on 9 November 1938, the "Kristallnacht", the Nazis burnt down the synagogue of the Jewish community in the Lower Street, which had been built in 1857. Immediately afterwards, Jewish citizens were excluded from public life and society. Thus the store of Elias Lion was "aryanised" after numerous boycotts and taken over by Thomas (today the Hagemeyer store). During World War II the RAF bombed the city twice at night. Two bombs fell behind city hall, and six bombs parallel to Windmuehlenstrasse. On 9 April 1945 the town was captured without opposition by American troops, and thus escaped war damage.

In 1948 Stadthagen became the administrative centre of the newly formed district of Schaumburg-Lippe and in 1977 of the new district of Schaumburg. The population of Stadthagen increased to 23,000 in 1973 due to the amalgamation with surrounding communities under the local government reform. Subsequently, in 1982, the town's new administrative centre was built on the site of the former town brewery. Between 1980 and 1990 the streets in the town centre were converted to pedestrian zones.

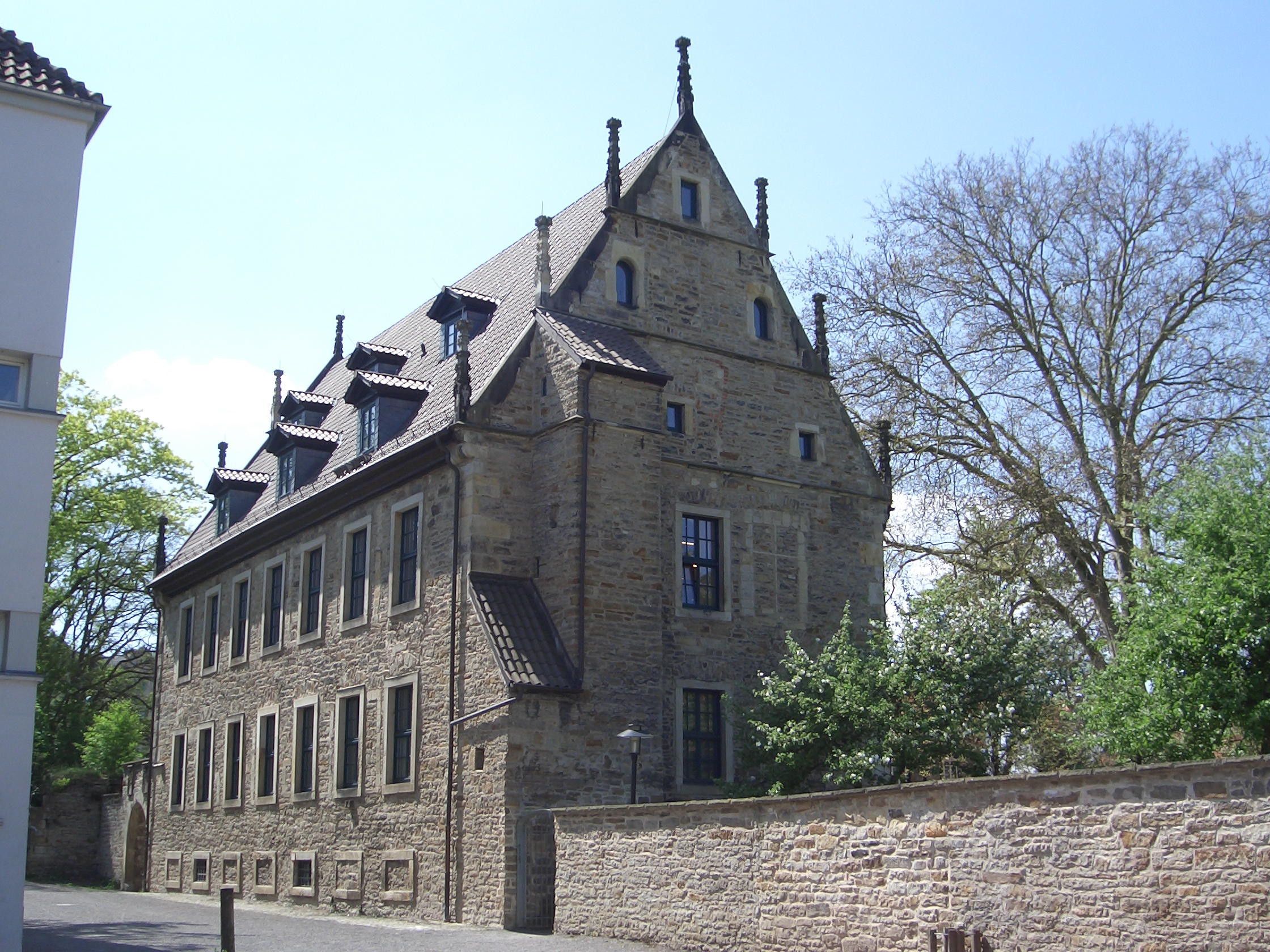
Landsbergscher Hof (Public library)

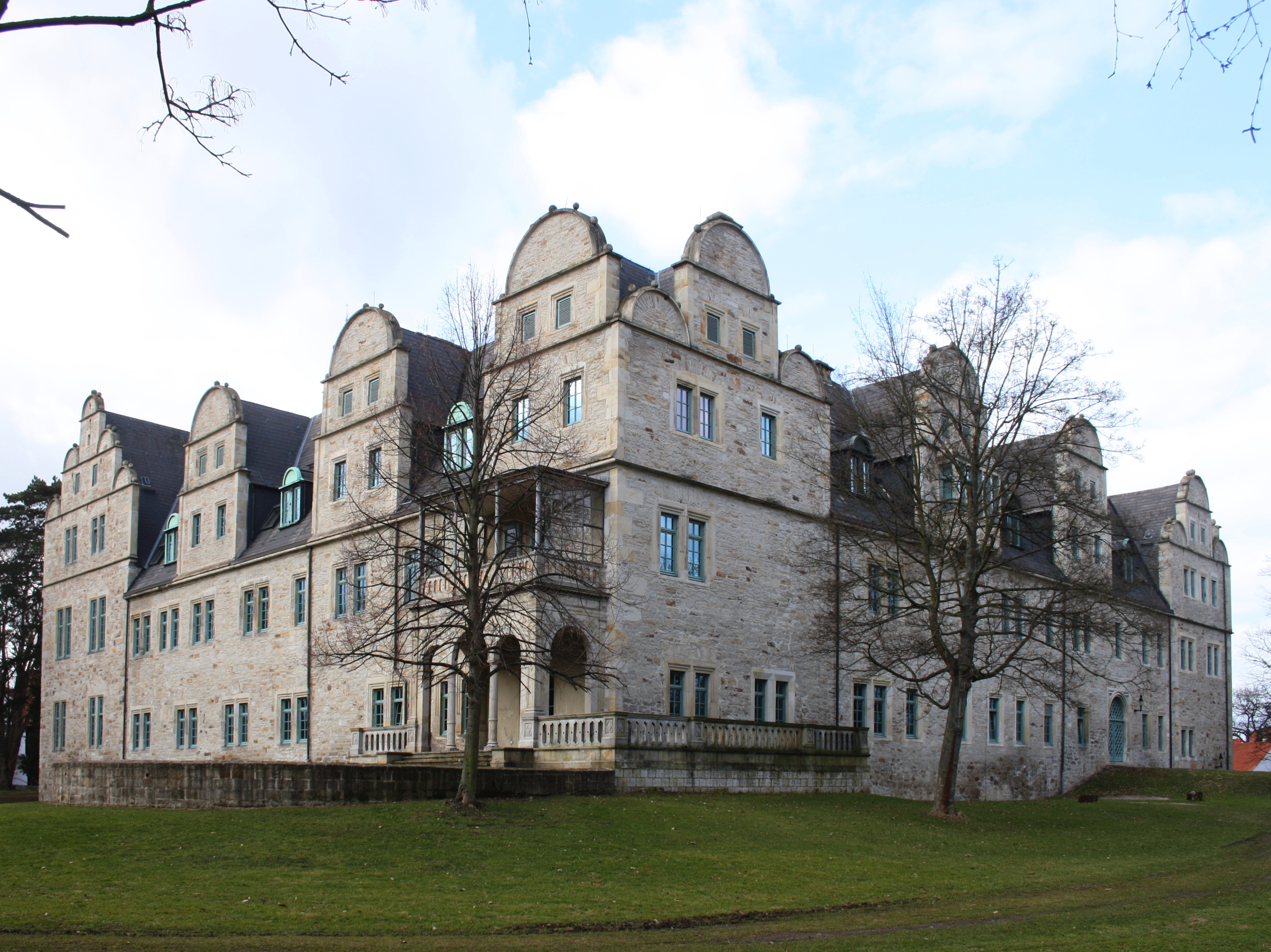
Stadthagen castle

== Population development ==
Year	Inhabitants
1961	20,097
1970	22,228
1987	22,109
1990	22,778
1995	23,556
2000	23,802
2005	23,181
2010	22,272
2013	21,594
2015	21,814
2016	22.707

== Notable people ==
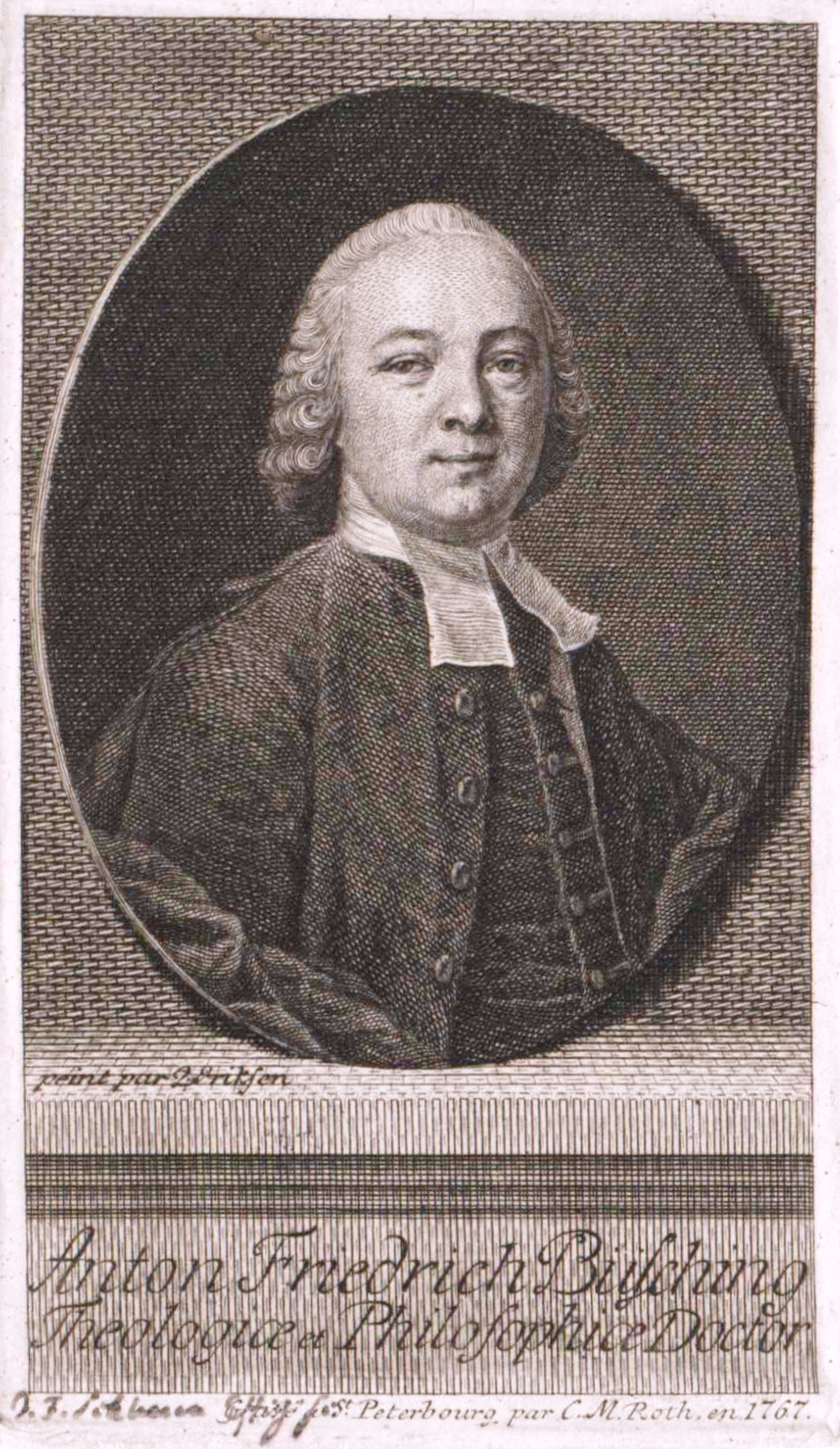
Anton Friedrich Busching, 1767

- Anton Friedrich Büsching (1724–1793), geographer, historian, theologian, pedagogue and biographer.
- Rudolf Westphal (1826–1892), classical scholar, died locally.
- Marie Kreft (1876–1963), politician
- Adolf II, Prince of Schaumburg-Lippe (1883–1936), the last ruler of Principality of Schaumburg-Lippe, 1911 to 1918.
- Wolrad, Prince of Schaumburg-Lippe (1887–1962), head of the House of Schaumburg-Lippe, 1936 to 1962
- Werner Schwier (1921–1982), lawyer, actor and presenter of the ARD television series "Es darf gelacht werden"
- Peter Schilling (1939–2017), synthpop musician; 1983 hit single Major Tom (Coming Home)
- Erik Spiekermann (born 1947), designer, typographer, writer and author
- Katja Flint (born 1959), film actress
- Vanessa Hegelmaier (born 1987), model

=== Sport ===
- Jutta Heine (born 1940), sprinter; won two silver medals at the 1960 Summer Olympics
- Detlev Dammeier (born 1968), football coach and a former player, played 520 games
- Marco Schikora (born 1994), footballer who has played over 270 games
- Timo Kastening (born 1995), handball player, played 52 games for Germany men's national handball team

== See also ==
- Metropolitan region Hannover-Braunschweig-Göttingen-Wolfsburg
