= Schaumburg-Lippe =

German principality (1647–1918)

County (Principality) of Schaumburg-Lippe Grafschaft (Fürstentum) Schaumburg-Lippe (German)
- 1647–1918
- Flag (c. 1880–1918) Coat of Arms
- Anthem: Heil unserm Fürsten, heil Hail to our Prince, hail!
- Schaumburg-Lippe within the German Empire

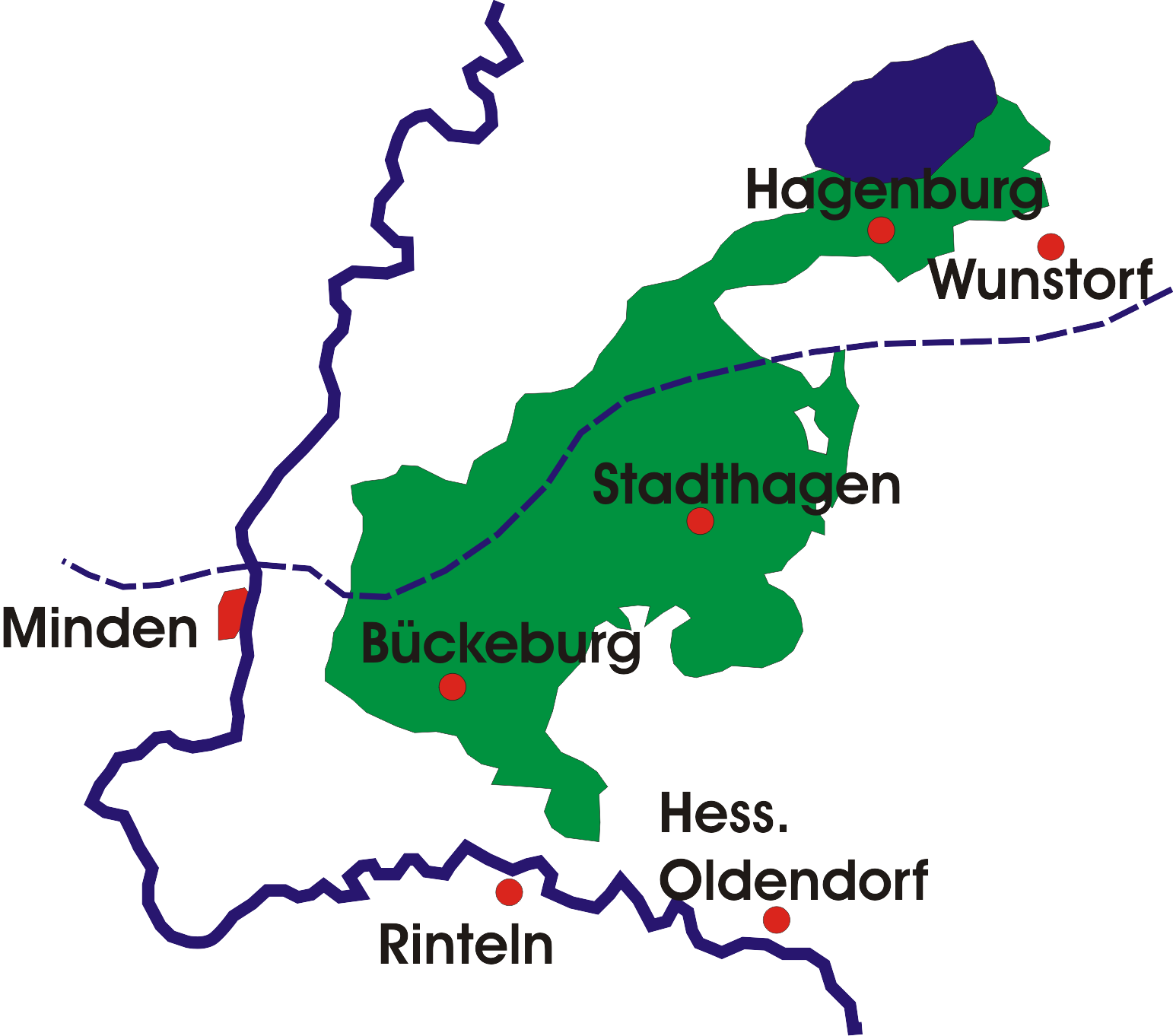
- Status: State of the Holy Roman Empire (1789–1806); State of the Confederation of the Rhine (1806–1813); State of the German Confederation (1815–1866); State of the North German Confederation (1867–1871); State of the German Empire (1871–1918)
- Capital: Bückeburg
- Prince
  - 1807–1860: George William (first)
  - 1911–1918: Adolf II (last)
- Historical era: Early modern Europe
  - Partitioned from Schaumburg: 1647
  - Inherited Lippe-Alverdissen: 1777
  - Raised to principality: 1807
  - German Revolution: 1918
  - Merged into Lower Saxony: 1946

Population
  - 1861: 29,000
Preceded by	Succeeded by
County of Schaumburg	Free State of Schaumburg-Lippe

Schaumburg-Lippe, also called Lippe-Schaumburg, was created as a county in 1647, became a principality in 1807 and a free state in 1918, and was until 1946 a small state in Germany, located in the present-day state of Lower Saxony, with its capital at Bückeburg, an area of 340 km^{2} (130 sq mi) and over 40,000 inhabitants.

== History ==
Schaumburg-Lippe was formed as a county in 1647 through the division of the County of Schaumburg by treaties between the Duke of Brunswick-Lüneburg, the Landgrave of Hesse-Kassel and the Count of Lippe. The division occurred because Count Otto V of Holstein-Schaumburg had died in 1640 leaving no male heir. Initially Schaumburg-Lippe's position was somewhat precarious: it had to share a wide variety of institutions and facilities with the County of Schaumburg (which belonged to Hesse-Kassel), including the representative assembly and the highly productive Bückeberg mines, and the Landgrave of Hesse-Kassel retained some feudal rights over it. It was further threatened by the headstrong policies of the ruling Count, Frederick Christian. To counter these threats, Frederick's grandson, Count William (who reigned 1748–1777) retained a standing army of up to 1000 troops – quite a lot for such a small territory.

With William's death in 1777, the junior line Schaumburg-Lippe-Alverdissen inherited the county, thereby reuniting Schaumburg-Lippe with Lippe-Alverdissen.

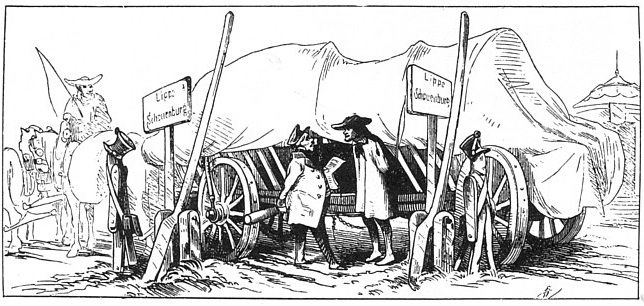
German cartoon from 1834 poking fun at the microscopic size of Schaumburg-Lippe by exaggeration, before the Zollverein

Schaumburg-Lippe was a county until 1807, when it became a principality; from 1871 it was a state within the German Empire. In 1913, it was the least populous state in the German Empire. The capital was Bückeburg, while Stadthagen was the only other town. Under the constitution of 1868, there was a legislative diet of 15 members with ten elected by the towns and rural districts, one each by the nobility, clergy and educated classes and the remaining two nominated by the prince. Schaumburg-Lippe sent one member to the Bundesrat (federal council) and one deputy to the Reichstag. The principality lasted until the end of the German monarchies in 1918, when it became a free state as the Free State of Schaumburg-Lippe.

== Rulers of Schaumburg-Lippe ==
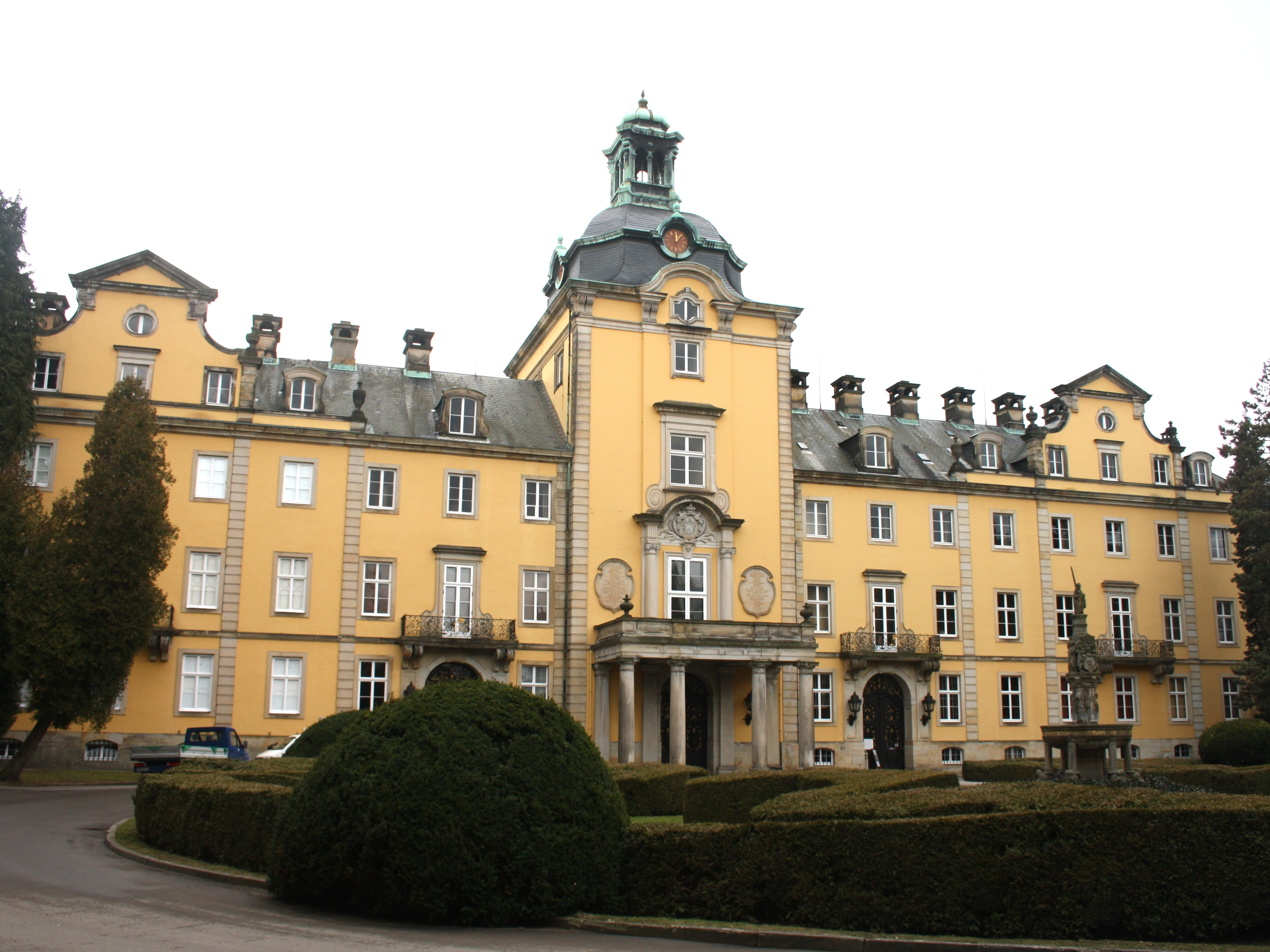
Bückeburg Palace, former residence of the ruling princes, still owned by the princely family

Princely standard

=== Counts of Schaumburg-Lippe (1640–1807) ===
- Philip I, Count of Schaumburg-Lippe (1601–1681), Count of Lippe-Alverdissen 1613–1640, of Schaumburg-Lippe 1640–1681
  - Frederick Christian, Count of Schaumburg-Lippe (1655–1728), Count of Schaumburg-Lippe 1681–1728
    - Albert Wolfgang, Count of Schaumburg-Lippe (1699–1748), Count of Schaumburg-Lippe 1728–1748
      - William, Count of Schaumburg-Lippe (1724–77), Count of Schaumburg-Lippe 1748–1777
  - Philip Ernest, Count of Lippe-Alverdissen (1659–1753)
    - Frederick Ernest, Count of Lippe-Alverdissen (1694–1777)
      - Philip II, Count of Schaumburg-Lippe (1723–87), Count of Schaumburg-Lippe 1777–1787
        - George William, Count of Schaumburg-Lippe (1784–1860), Count of Schaumburg-Lippe 1787–1807, became Prince in 1807

=== Princes of Schaumburg-Lippe (1807–1918) ===
- George William, Prince of Schaumburg-Lippe (1784–60), 1st Prince 1807–1860
  - Adolf I, Prince of Schaumburg-Lippe (1817–1893), 2nd Prince 1860–1893
    - George, Prince of Schaumburg-Lippe (1846–1911), 3rd Prince 1893–1911
      - Adolf II, Prince of Schaumburg-Lippe (1883–1936), 4th Prince 1911–1936, abdicated 1918

== See also ==
- List of consorts of Lippe
