= Rund =

Rund is a surname. Notable people with the surname include:

- Cathleen Rund (born 1977), German swimmer
- Hanno Rund (1925–1993), German mathematician
- Thorsten Rund (born 1976), German road and track cyclist

== See also ==
- Rand (surname)
- Ruud
