= Rand (surname) =

Family name

Rand is a surname. Notable people with the surname include:

- Archie Rand (born 1949), American painter and muralist
- Austin L. Rand (1905–1982), Canadian zoologist
- Ayn Rand (1905–1982), Russian-American philosopher and author
- Benjamin H. Rand (1827–1883), American physician
- Dave Rand (born 1973), Welsh cyclist
- Dick Rand (1936–1996), American baseball player
- Edgar E. Rand (c. 1905–1955), American business executive
- Frank C. Rand (1876–1949), American businessman and philanthropist
- Gloria Rand, Canadian actor
- Isaac Rand (1674–1743), English botanist and apothecary
- Ivan Rand (1884–1969), Canadian lawyer and politician
- Jack Rand (1902–1970), English football player
- James Rand, Jr. (1886–1968), American industrialist
- Joanne Rand (1969/70–2017), English acid attack victim
- John G. Rand (1801–1873), American inventor of paint tube
- John L. Rand (1861–1942), American politician and jurist
- Johnathan Rand (born 1964; Christopher Wright), American children's writer
- Keith Rand (1956–2013), English sculptor
- Kristjan Rand (born 1987), Estonian ice dancer
- Leander Rand (1827–1900), Canadian politician
- Mary Rand (1940–2026), British track-and-field athlete
- Nelson Rand, Canadian journalist
- Paul Rand (1914–1996), American graphic designer
- Philinda Rand (1876–1972), American English-language teacher in the Philippines
- Reili Rand (born 1991), Estonian politician
- Ripley Rand (born 1967), American jurist
- Rose Rand (1903–1980), Austrian-American logician and philosopher
- Sally Rand (1904–1979), American burlesque dancer and film actress
- Scott Rand (darts player) (born 1975), British darts player
- Shuli Rand (born 1962), Israeli film actor
- Sidney Rand (ambassador) (1916–2003), American diplomat
- Sidney Rand (rower) (1934–2008), English rower
- Silas Tertius Rand (1810–1889), Canadian clergyman, ethnologist, linguist and translator
- Taavi Rand (born 1992), Estonian ice dancer
- Ted Rand (1916–2005), American book illustrator
- Theodore Harding Rand (1835–1900), Canadian educator and poet
- Tom Rand (costume designer), British costume designer
- Tony Rand (1939–2020), American lawyer and politician
- Tuuli Rand (born 1990), Estonian singer
- Tyler Rand (born 1991), American arts executive
- Walter Rand (1919–1995), American politician
- William Rand (athlete) (1886–1981), American hurdler
- William Rand (physician) (fl. 1650–1660), English physician
- William Rand (printer) (1828–1915), American publisher and businessman
- Yvonne Rand (1935–2020), American Zen Buddhist priest

Fictional characters

- Atton Rand, from Star Wars: Knights of the Old Republic II
- Janice Rand, in the Star Trek universe
- Iron Fist (character) (Daniel Rand), a Marvel Comics character
- Ben Rand, from Being There (1979) performed by Melvyn Douglas
- Bronya Rand, from the Honkai Star Rail videogame

== See also ==
- Rands (surname), an English surname
