= Westendorf =

Westendorf may refer to:

== Places ==
- Westendorf, Tyrol, Kitzbühel district, Austria
- Westendorf (Allgäu), Ostallgäu district, Bavaria, Germany
- Westendorf (Schmutter), Augsburg district, Bavaria, Germany
- Westendorf (Rinteln), Schaumburg district, Lower Saxony, Germany

== People ==
- Anke Westendorf (later Maukel) (born 1954), German volleyball player
- Thomas Westendorf (1848–1923), American composer
- Uwe Westendorf (born 1966), German freestyle wrestler
- Wolfhart Westendorf (1924–2018), German Egyptologist
