= Ruurd =

Ruurd is a given name. Notable people with the given name include:

- Ruurd Dirk Hoogland (1922–1994), Dutch explorer
- Ruurd Leegstra (1877–1933), Dutch rower and Olympian

== See also ==
- Ruud
