= Ryan Preece =

American racing driver (born 1990)

- Preece at Las Vegas Motor Speedway in 2026
- Born: Ryan Jeffrey Preece; October 25, 1990 (age 36); Berlin, Connecticut, U.S.
- Height: 6 ft 0 in (1.83 m)
- Weight: 154 lb (70 kg)
- Achievements: 2013 NASCAR Whelen Modified Tour Champion; 2026 Cook Out Clash Winner; 2015, 2016, 2017 World Series of Asphalt Tour-Type Modified Champion; 2011 Race of Champions Winner; 2012, 2014 North-South Shootout Winner; 2015 SK 5K Winner; 2015 Turkey Derby Winner; 2017, 2018 Spring Sizzler Winner; 2017 All-Star Shootout Winner; 2018, 2020 Islip 300 Winner; 2019 Twisted Tea Open Modified 80 Winner; 2023 Virginia is for Racing Lovers 200 Winner; 2025 New England 900 Winner

NASCAR Cup Series career
- 259 races run over 9 years
- Car no., team: No. 6 (RFK Racing)
- 2026 position: 15th
- Best finish: 15th (2026)
- First race: 2015 Sylvania 300 (New Hampshire)
- Last race: 2026 Season Finale 400 (Homestead)
- First win: 2026 Coke Zero Sugar 400 (Daytona)
Wins	Top tens	Poles
1	40	2

NASCAR O'Reilly Auto Parts Series career
- 62 races run over 7 years
- 2022 position: 82nd
- Best finish: 17th (2016)
- First race: 2013 CNBC Prime's The Profit 200 (New Hampshire)
- Last race: 2022 Tennessee Lottery 250 (Nashville)
- First win: 2017 U.S. Cellular 250 (Iowa)
- Last win: 2018 Fitzgerald Glider Kits 300 (Bristol)
Wins	Top tens	Poles
2	21	1

NASCAR FedEx Freight Truck Series career
- 12 races run over 2 years
- 2022 position: 18th
- Best finish: 18th (2022)
- First race: 2021 Rackley Roofing 200 (Nashville)
- Last race: 2022 Baptist Health 200 (Homestead)
- First win: 2021 Rackley Roofing 200 (Nashville)
- Last win: 2022 Rackley Roofing 200 (Nashville)
Wins	Top tens	Poles
2	11	1

ARCA Menards Series East career
- 4 races run over 3 years
- Best finish: 36th (2016)
- First race: 2015 UNOH 100 (Richmond)
- Last race: 2017 Busch North Throwback 100 (Thompson)
Wins	Top tens	Poles
0	3	0

ARCA Menards Series West career
- 2 races run over 2 years
- Best finish: 36th (2023)
- First race: 2019 Procore 200 (Sonoma)
- Last race: 2023 General Tire 200 (Sonoma)
- First win: 2023 General Tire 200 (Sonoma)
Wins	Top tens	Poles
1	1	1
- Statistics up to date as of November 8, 2026.

Ryan Jeffrey Preece (born October 25, 1990) is an American professional stock car racing driver. He competes full-time in the NASCAR Cup Series, driving the No. 6 Ford Mustang Dark Horse SC for RFK Racing.

Preece has previously competed in the NASCAR Xfinity Series, NASCAR Camping World Truck Series, ARCA Menards Series East, and the ARCA Menards Series West.

Preece is also a veteran of the NASCAR Whelen Modified Tour and won the series championship in 2013 after being the runner-up in 2009 and 2012. He also made multiple starts in the defunct NASCAR Whelen Southern Modified Tour.

== Racing career ==
=== Early career ===
Preece began racing in 2007 and became 32nd in the championship in the Northeastern Midget Association with the Bertrand team. A year later, he finished on the podium for the first time in his career with a third place finish at Monadnock in his only Northeastern Midget race that year.

Preece competed in and won the championship in the SK Modified Series in 2011 at Stafford Motor Speedway, while his future wife, Heather, was the series' Rookie of the Year.

=== Whelen Modified Tour ===
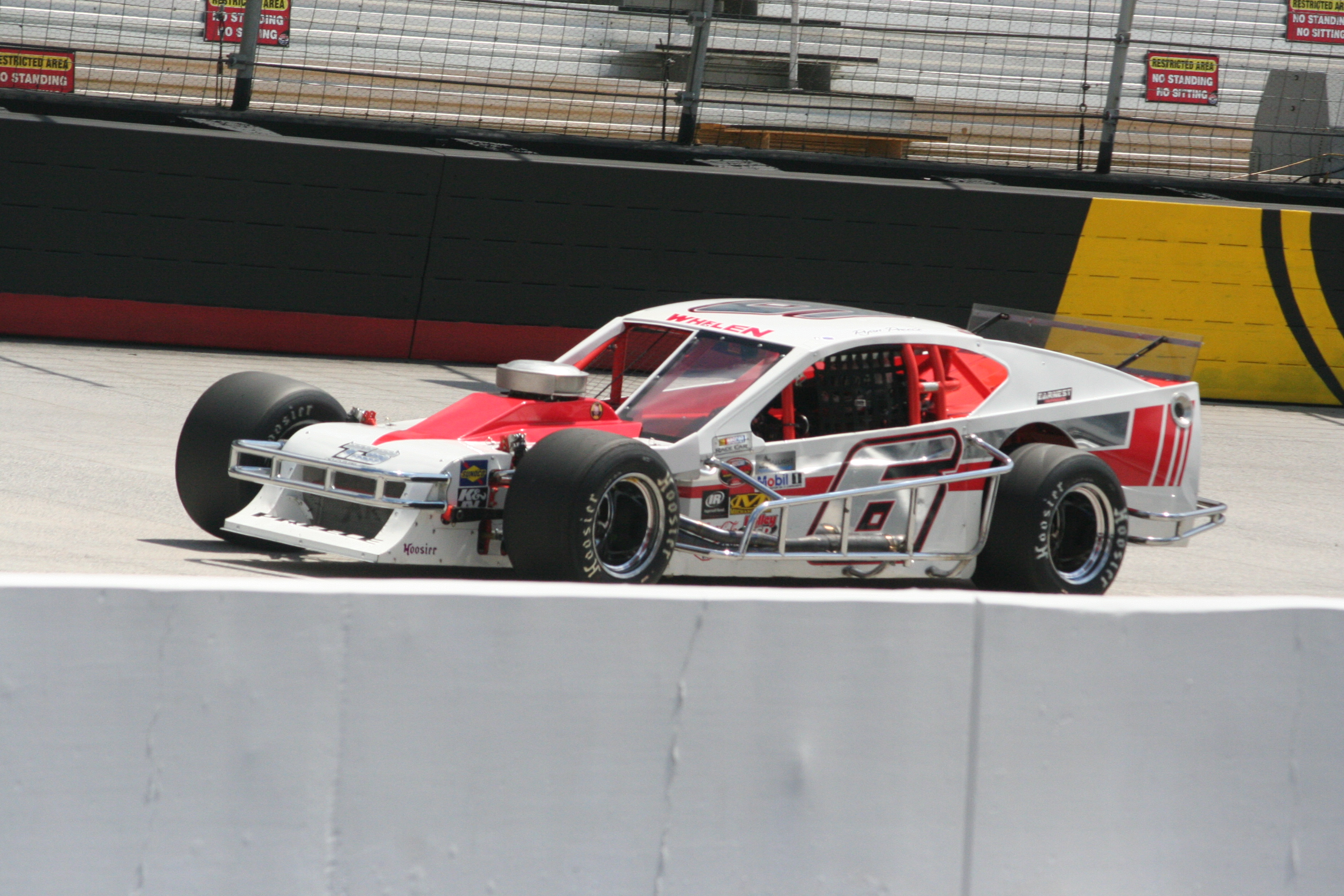
Preece's Modified Tour car in 2015

That same year, Preece got his first career victory in the Whelen Modified Tour after dominating the Made In America Whelen 300 at Martinsville. In 2009 and 2012, he was runner-up in the NASCAR Whelen Modified Tour, but he became champion in 2013 with four wins in fourteen races, driving for Flamingo Motorsports, owned by Eric Sanderson. In 2014, he returned to the team and won the last two races of the year, coming home in second place in the final standings. In 2015, he drove for TS Haulers Racing, owned by Ed Partridge.

On November 24, 2016, it was announced that Preece would remain at JD Motorsports for another full season in 2017. However, on December 8, 2016, it was announced that Preece and JD Motorsports had parted ways, letting Preece explore other opportunities. The primary reason why Preece left JD is that he wanted to be on a team to win races and expected to be back in the Whelen Modified Tour in 2017. He rejoined Partridge's team in the Modified Tour.

=== Xfinity Series ===
==== 2013–2017 ====
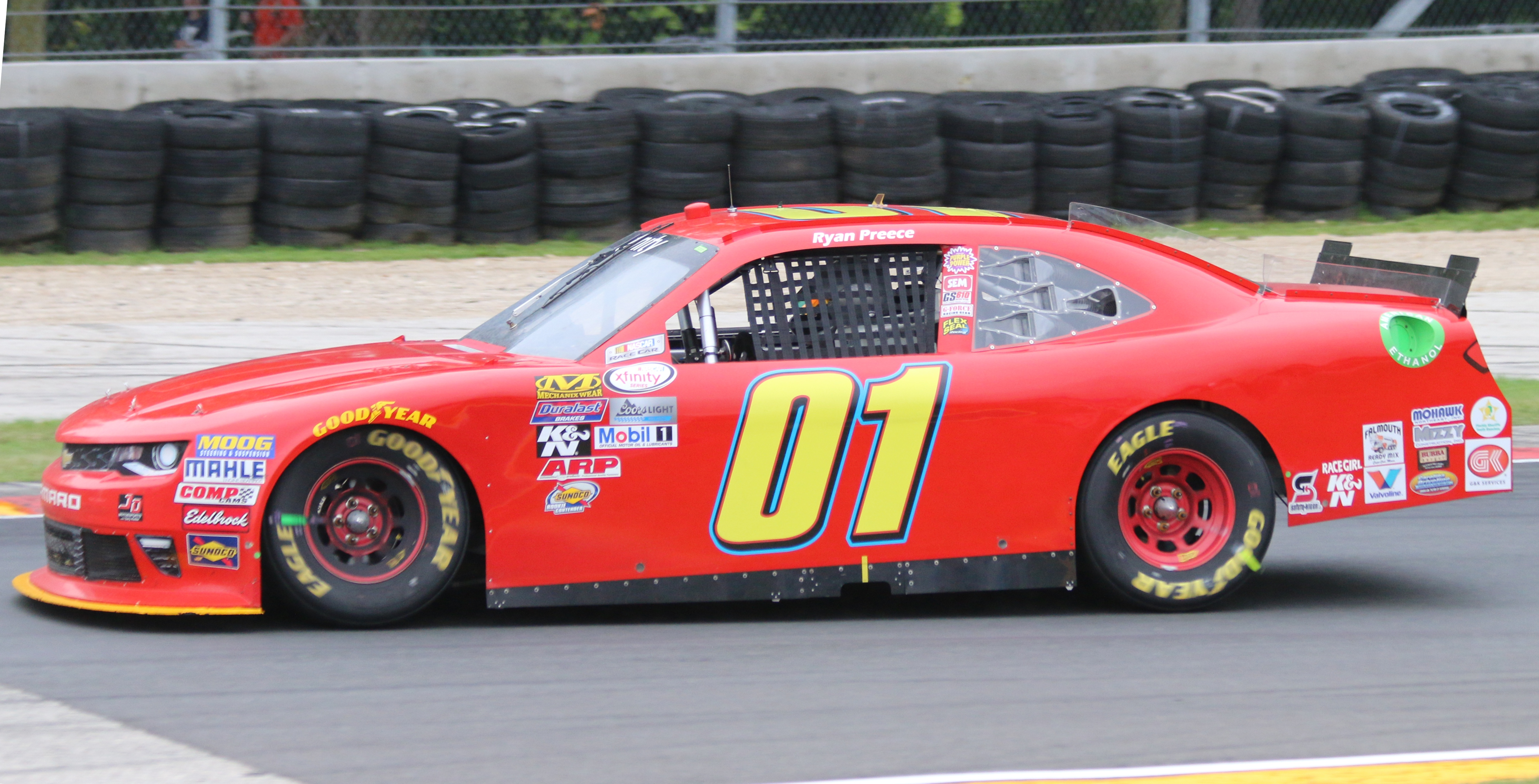
Preece in the No. 01 at Road America in 2016

Preece made his debut in the Nationwide Series in 2013 and finished 24th at Loudon driving the No. 8 Chevrolet Camaro for Tommy Baldwin Racing. In 2014, he drove two races driving the No. 36 Camaro for TBR at Loudon and Homestead, with a best finish of fourteenth.

On August 8, 2015, Preece announced he would make his NASCAR Cup Series debut for TBR at Loudon. Preece joined JD Motorsports full-time in 2016, driving the No. 01 Chevrolet in the Xfinity Series. The primary sponsor was Flex Seal. Preece had several decent runs for the mid-pack organization in 2016, just missing the first-ever Xfinity playoffs.

==== 2017–2018: Joe Gibbs Racing ====
In July 2017, Preece returned to the Xfinity Series, racing at Loudon in the No. 20 Toyota Camry for Joe Gibbs Racing with sponsorship from Mohawk Northeast and Mizzy Construction, finishing a career-best second behind teammate Kyle Busch. The opportunity originally came after Kevin Manion contacted Preece about openings at JGR after the retirement of Carl Edwards.

At Iowa, Preece returned to the No. 20 with Mohawk and Falmouth Construction sponsoring. Preece won the pole and held off teammate Kyle Benjamin on a late restart to win his first career Xfinity race.

After his Iowa win, JGR announced that Preece would also drive for the team at Kentucky Speedway in September (a standalone Xfinity race), and later Homestead (where Cup drivers, regardless of experience, are prohibited from participating). Preece, with the American Red Cross on the No. 20 car, finished fourth at Kentucky.

Preece moved to Gibbs' No. 18 Safelite Toyota at Homestead. Preece was involved in a controversy, as championship contender Elliott Sadler placed the blame on Preece for blocking him on the final restart of the season. Preece still managed a top-five finish.

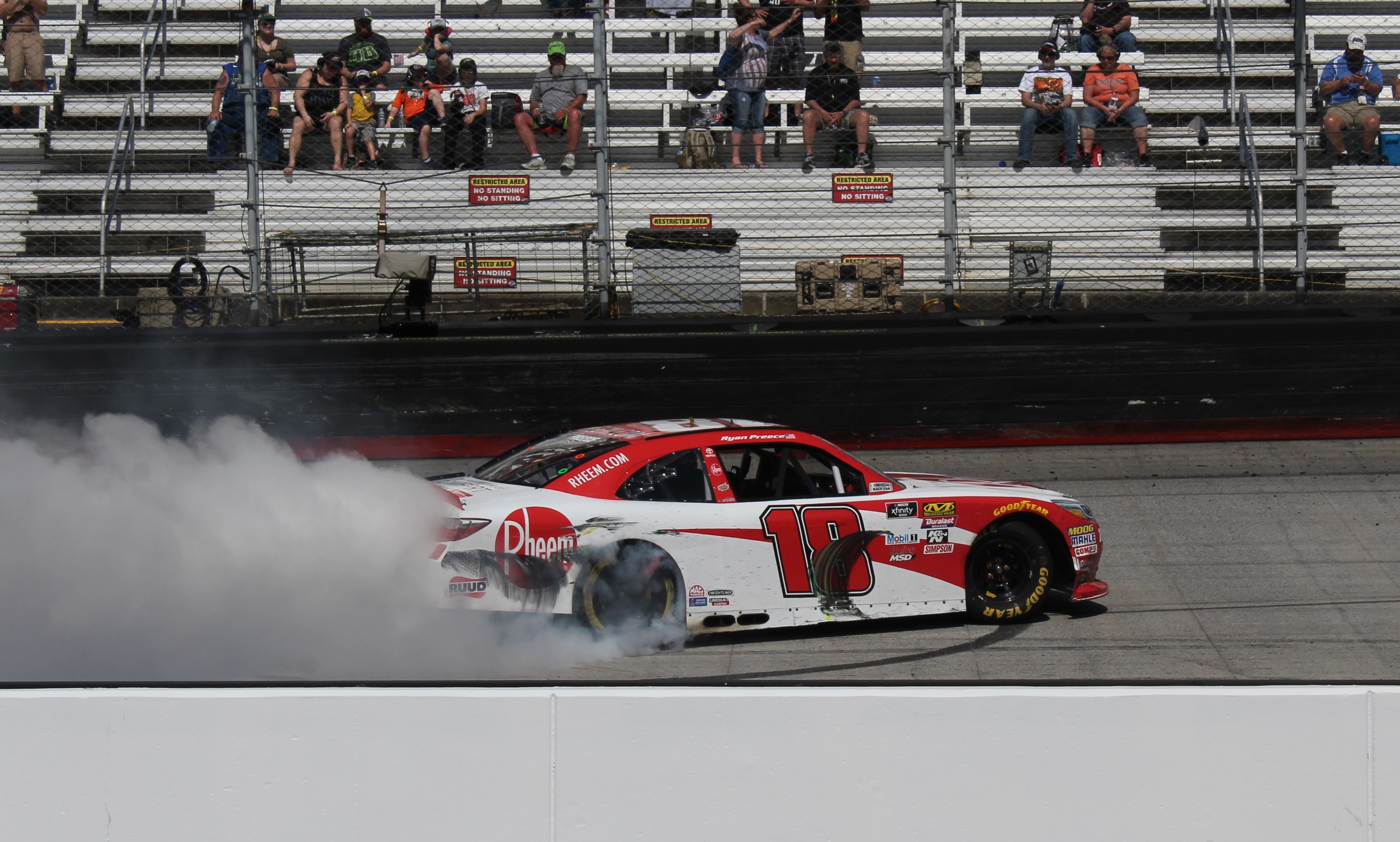
Preece after winning the 2018 Fitzgerald Glider Kits 300

On November 15, 2017, it was announced that Preece would run another partial schedule with JGR in 2018, running at least ten races in the No. 18 car, sharing it with JGR Cup drivers Kyle Busch, Erik Jones and Daniel Suárez, JGR development driver Kyle Benjamin, and Australian James Davison. While he was listed for ten races, more races were possible. Sponsorship of Preece's races in the No. 18 would come primarily from Rheem. A few of the races were instead supported by Ruud and its affiliate businesses.

Preece began his season with a ninth-place finish at California, his first time finishing outside the top five at Gibbs. He got back in the top five a week later at Texas.

Preece became eligible for the Xfinity Dash 4 Cash after his good run at Texas. The next week at Bristol, Preece won the race and the bonus, taking home the $100,000. It was Preece's second career Xfinity Series win.

Preece did not run any of the other Dash 4 Cash races. He returned to the No. 18 car at Daytona.

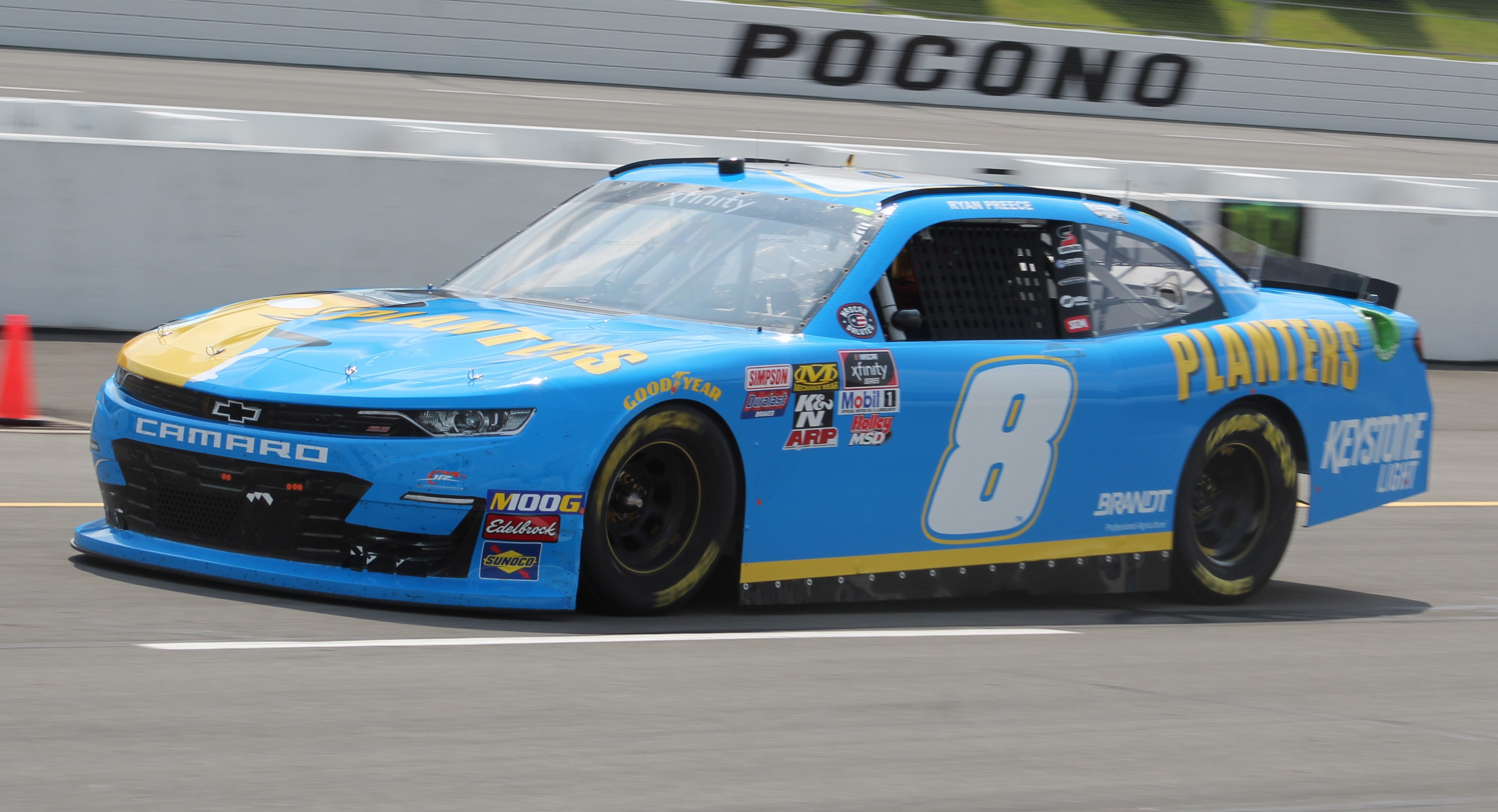
Preece in the No. 8 for JR Motorsports in 2019 at Pocono

==== 2019: JR Motorsports ====
For 2019, Preece joined JR Motorsports to drive their No. 8 part-time. He competed in four events, all finishing in the top ten with a highest of fourth at Pocono.

=== Cup Series ===
==== 2015: Premium Motorsports ====
Preece drove the No. 98 Chevy out of the TBR shop in partnership with Premium Motorsports. After starting 37th, he finished 32nd in the Sylvania 300. Preece returned to the Cup Series for the final four races of the season with Premium. TBR did not assist his races at Martinsville, Texas, and Phoenix, though they returned to help field the No. 98 at Homestead out of their shop.

==== 2019–2021: JTG Daugherty Racing ====
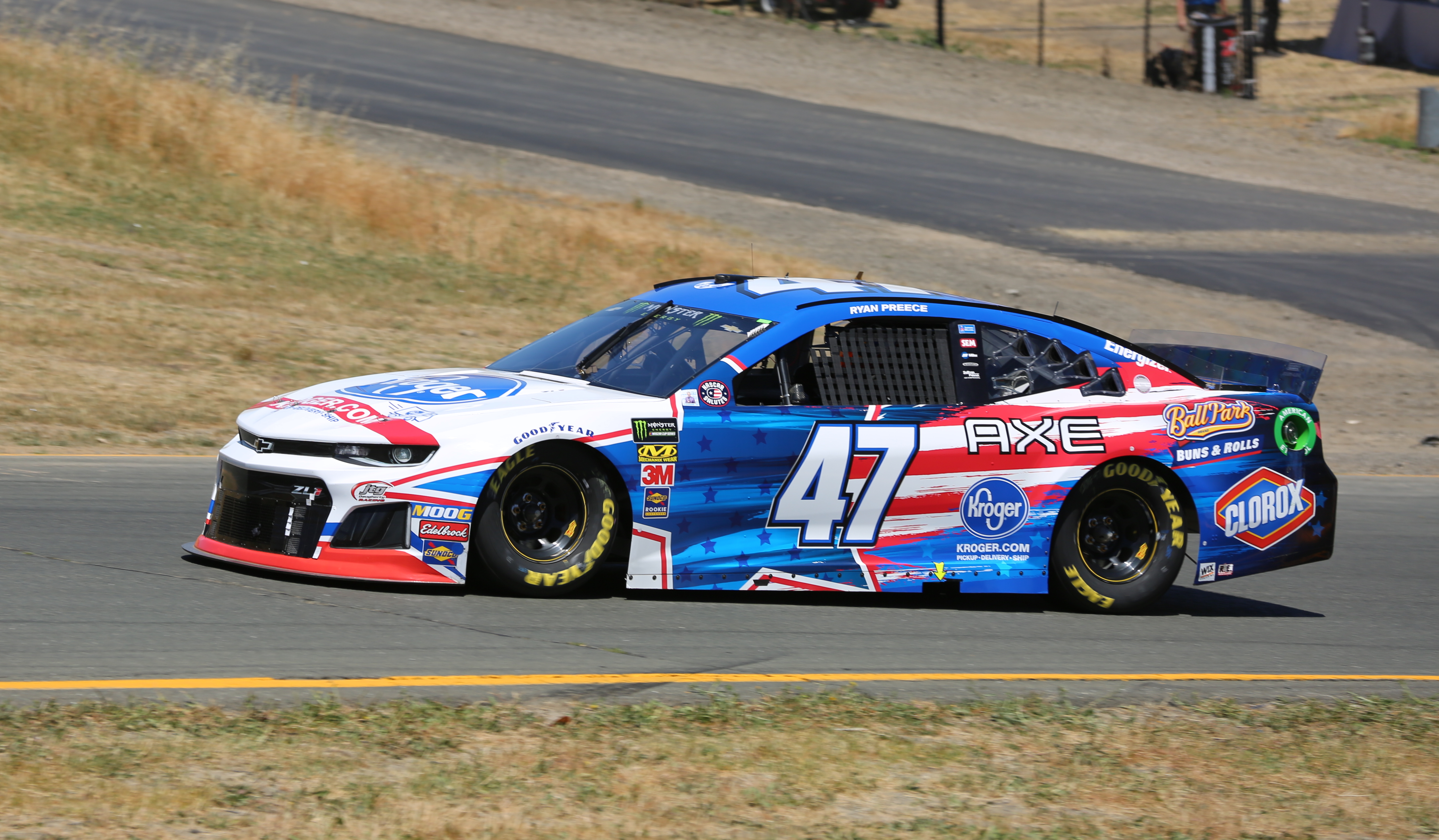
Preece's No. 47 during the 2019 Toyota/Save Mart 350

On September 28, 2018, Preece was announced as the new full-time driver of the No. 47 Chevrolet Camaro ZL1 for JTG Daugherty Racing in 2019, replacing the departing A. J. Allmendinger and competing for 2019 Rookie of the Year honors. Preece also joined JR Motorsports for a part-time Xfinity Series schedule in the No. 8 Camaro.

On August 16, 2019, Preece confirmed that he would remain with the team for the 2020 season. However, he moved to JTG's No. 37 car as new teammate Ricky Stenhouse Jr. took over the No. 47. For the Toyota 500 at Darlington Raceway, Preece started on the pole via field inversion, unofficially marking his first career pole at the Cup level; he had finished twentieth in the previous race, and a field inversion placed him in first. Despite running with the leaders for much of the Toyota 500's early stages, he finished last after his engine failed on lap 69. Preece was involved in a violent crash on a restart at Kansas Speedway in July 2020. On a restart down the backstretch, Christopher Bell came up in front of Ryan Newman, sending Bell into the outside wall. Bell came back across traffic, where Newman tagged Preece, and Preece hit the inside wall head-on and nearly sent Preece on his side. Fortunately, Preece walked out unscathed. It was Preece's fourth straight DNF, but he broke a string of last-place finishes. Preece scored a total of eight DNFs during the season and finished out the year 29th in points.

Preece returned to the No. 37 in 2021, but the car did not have a charter that would have guaranteed it a spot in every race and only carried enough sponsorship for 24 of 36 races. The performance and funding of the team suffered. The No. 37 would be shut down after 2021, leaving Preece without a ride.

==== 2022: Part-time driver ====
On January 6, 2022, Stewart–Haas Racing hired Preece as a reserve driver, as the backup driver for all related teams and simulator driver for SHR. Preece will also race two Cup races for Rick Ware Racing at Dover and Charlotte, three Xfinity races for B. J. McLeod Motorsports at Richmond, Charlotte, and Nashville, and seven Truck races for David Gilliland Racing. Preece started thirteenth in the No. 15 Rick Ware Racing car for his Cup Series start in the 2022 DuraMAX Drydene 400 at Dover and finished 25th. Preece would run all three races during the Coke 600 weekend. He finished eleventh in the Truck Series event after being involved in an accident with Carson Hocevar. On June 24, 2022, Preece would win his first career NASCAR Camping World Truck Series pole at Nashville Superspeedway. He would go on to lead 74 of the 150 laps, winning Stage 2 and his second career Truck Series race. He would also race in the Xfinity Series event the following day.

==== 2023–2024: Stewart–Haas Racing ====
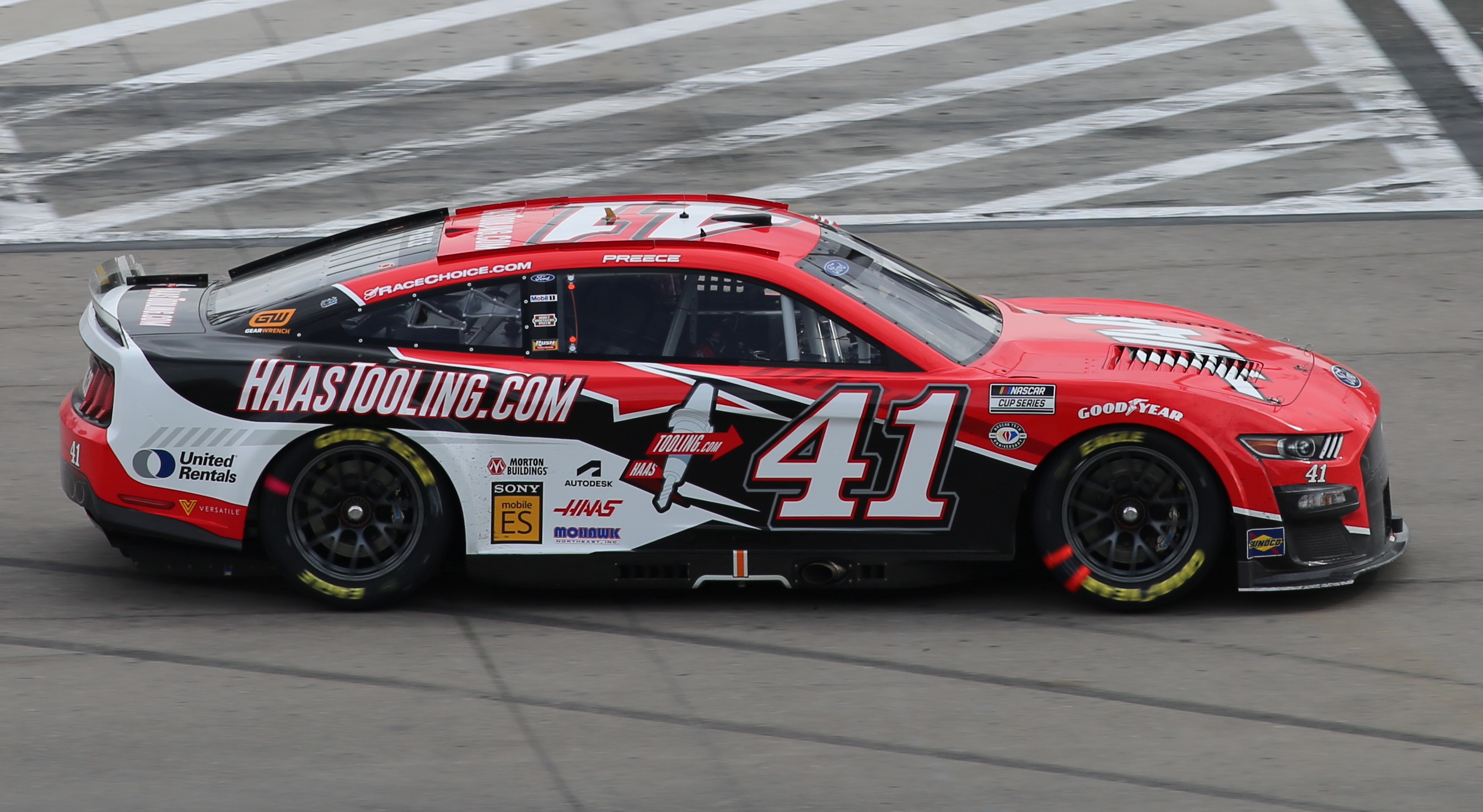
Preece's No. 41 at Las Vegas Motor Speedway in 2023

On November 16, 2022, Stewart–Haas Racing announced that Preece would replace Cole Custer in the No. 41 for the 2023 season while Custer would return to the 00 Xfinity Series entry. In December, Chad Johnston returned to SHR to replace Mike Shiplett as crew chief of the No. 41, after Shiplett moved to Richard Childress Racing.

Preece started the 2023 season with a 36th-place DNF at the 2023 Daytona 500. He scored his first career pole at Martinsville. He struggled throughout the regular season, scoring only one top-five finish at Richmond.

On August 26, at the Daytona summer race, Preece was running toward the tail of the lead pack in the closing stages of the race. On lap 157, while racing down the backstretch, he was pushed from the rear by Erik Jones. The contact sent Preece down the track, where he collided with teammate Chase Briscoe and spun onto the apron. As the car slid, aerodynamic forces lifted the car off the ground and rolled it onto its roof. The car landed upside-down in the grass before violently barrel-rolling roughly ten times before finally coming to a rest on its wheels. After a few moments, Preece exited the car under his own power, was put on a stretcher, and taken to a nearby hospital for further evaluation. During his time in the hospital, he tweeted that he would be coming back to race again and expressed disappointment that his race ended in the fashion it did. He was discharged the next morning and would be in the next race at Darlington. Preece would come into the next race at Darlington revealing in his interviews that he had two black eyes and both of his eyes were bloodshot from the wreck. The car was taken back to the NASCAR Research and Development center to be studied. Safety concerns emerged as film of the crash showed that the roof hatch, designed to allow the driver to escape from the car through a method other than via the driver's side window, was detached from the car early in the crash, exposing the cockpit during the remainder of the crash. Given his points situation entering the race, the crash eliminated Preece's chances of contending in the NASCAR playoffs.

Preece started the 2024 season with a 23rd-place finish at the 2024 Daytona 500. Following the Atlanta race, the No. 41 was hit with an L1 penalty and docked 35 owner and driver points after pre-race inspection revealed unapproved roof rails.

On May 28, 2024, Stewart–Haas Racing announced it would shut down its NASCAR operations at the end of the season.

==== 2025–present: RFK Racing ====
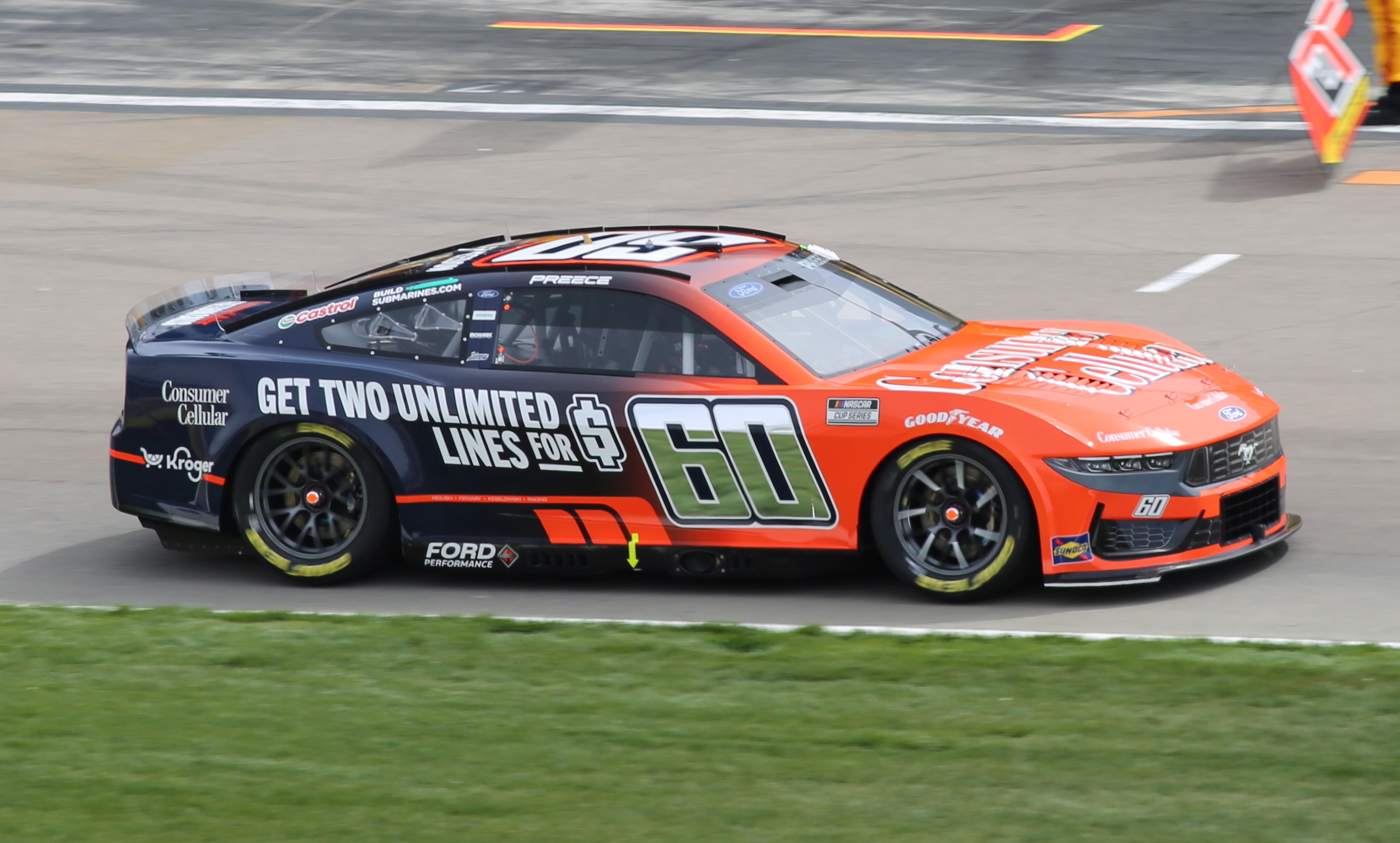
Preece's No. 60 car at Las Vegas Motor Speedway in 2025

On November 19, 2024, RFK Racing announced that Preece would drive the No. 60 car full-time in 2025. During the Daytona 500, Preece was involved in another airborne crash at Daytona. The incident occurred when Christopher Bell spun on lap 196, making contact with Preece and causing his car to lift into a wheelie before going airborne and flipping over. Preece then hit the wall, narrowly missing Erik Jones before it came back on all four wheels. After the wreck Preece climbed out of the car and was uninjured. A few weeks later at Las Vegas, Preece would earn his first top-five of the season, a third place finish, tying his career best finish since Talladega in 2019. At Talladega, Preece finished second to Austin Cindric by 0.022 seconds, but was disqualified after post-race inspection revealed the spoiler had three shims instead of two.

Preece started the 2026 season with a win at the Cook Out Clash. Following the race at Texas, he was penalized 25 points and fined US$50,000 for wrecking Ty Gibbs. NASCAR determined Preece's actions were premeditated during a radio conversation with his team after an earlier run-in with Gibbs during the race.

Throughout the summer, Preece and the No. 60 team found themselves in contention for a coveted spot in the Chase for the Cup, newly rebranded from the elimination-style playoff format used in the NASCAR Cup Series from 2014 to 2025. Going into the final race of the regular season at Daytona, Preece sat 17th in the championship points standings with a 31-point deficit to Shane Van Gisbergen, who held the 16th and final spot in the Chase. After recovering from an early-race incident, Preece took the race lead on an overtime finish, and held it to a race-ending caution to secure his first points-paying victory and the final spot in the Chase. The win was Preece's first in 249 starts over seven years of full-time Cup series competition.

On November 4, 2026, RFK announced that Preece would move from the No. 60 to the No. 6 car starting in the 2027 season.

=== Camping World Truck Series ===
Preece made his debut in the NASCAR Camping World Truck Series in 2021, driving the No. 17 for David Gilliland Racing in the races at Nashville Superspeedway and Pocono Raceway. Despite driving for a Chevrolet team in the Cup Series, Preece drove for DGR, a Ford team, in these starts. At Nashville, he passed Grant Enfinger with six laps remaining, which enabled him to become the fifth driver in series history to win in his first career start.

== Personal life ==
Preece was born in Berlin, Connecticut to Jeff and Jodie Preece. He is the youngest of three sons. In 2009, he graduated from Xavier High School.

Preece married his longtime girlfriend, Heather DesRochers, in 2017. Together, Ryan and Heather have two children, Rebecca Marie (born August 7, 2023) and Bentley (born October 8, 2025). DesRochers is also a racing driver and was a participant in NASCAR's Drive for Diversity combine in 2009 and 2010, attempting to become one of the drivers selected to be in the D4D program, although she was not selected either year. The two met at Stafford Motor Speedway in 2009 and competed against each other in the SK Modified Series in 2011, where Preece won the championship, and DesRochers was the Rookie of the Year.

== Motorsports career results ==
=== Stock car career summary ===
Season	Series	Team	Races	Wins	Top 5	Top 10	Points	Position
2007	NASCAR Whelen Southern Modified Tour	Jeff Preece	1	0	1	1	155	38th
2007	NASCAR Whelen Modified Tour	Jeff Preece	14	0	0	3	1573	19th
2008	NASCAR Whelen Modified Tour	Jan Boehler	16	1	4	7	1948	10th
2008	NASCAR Camping World West Series	Maxie Bush	0	0	0	0	0	NC†
2008	NASCAR Camping World East Series	Maxie Bush	0	0	0	0	0	NC†
2009	NASCAR Whelen Modified Tour	Jan Boehler	13	2	10	12	2004	**2nd**
2010	NASCAR Whelen Modified Tour	Jan Boehler	14	0	6	8	1933	6th
2011	NASCAR Whelen Modified Tour	John Lukosavage	3	0	1	1	1310	22nd
2011	NASCAR Whelen Modified Tour	Jeff Preece	5	0	2	3	1310	22nd
2011	NASCAR Whelen Modified Tour	Barbara Park	1	0	1	1	1310	22nd
2011	NASCAR Whelen Modified Tour	Eric Sanderson	1	0	0	0	1310	22nd
2012	NASCAR Whelen Southern Modified Tour	Jodie Preece	2	0	1	1	75	27th
2012	NASCAR Whelen Modified Tour	Eric Sanderson	14	2	8	10	545	**2nd**
2013	NASCAR Whelen Southern Modified Tour	Jodie Preece	3	1	2	2	123	20th
2013	NASCAR Whelen Modified Tour	Eric Sanderson	14	4	10	10	549	**1st**
2013	NASCAR Nationwide Series	Tommy Baldwin Racing	1	0	0	0	20	72nd
2014	NASCAR Whelen Southern Modified Tour	Jodie Preece	2	0	1	2	102	22nd
2014	NASCAR Whelen Southern Modified Tour	Mike Curb	1	0	0	0	102	22nd
2014	NASCAR Whelen Modified Tour	Eric Sanderson	13	2	6	10	489	**2nd**
2014	NASCAR Nationwide Series	Tommy Baldwin Racing	2	0	0	0	46	53rd
2015	NASCAR Whelen Southern Modified Tour	Mike Curb	3	0	2	2	206	13th
2015	NASCAR Whelen Southern Modified Tour	Ed Partridge	2	1	2	2	206	13th
2015	NASCAR Whelen Modified Tour	Ed Partridge	15	4	7	14	602	**2nd**
2015	NASCAR K&N Pro Series East	Ranier Racing with MDM	1	0	0	0	30	51st
2015	NASCAR Sprint Cup Series	Premium Motorsports	5	0	0	0	35	44th
2016	NASCAR Whelen Southern Modified Tour	Mike Curb	1	1	1	1	81	18th
2016	NASCAR Whelen Southern Modified Tour	Ed Partridge	1	0	0	0	81	18th
2016	NASCAR Whelen Modified Tour	Ed Partridge	8	0	3	6	277	24th
2016	NASCAR K&N Pro Series East	Marsh Racing	2	0	0	2	72	36th
2016	NASCAR Xfinity Series	JD Motorsports	33	0	0	1	597	17th
2017	NASCAR Whelen Modified Tour	Ed Partridge	14	5	12	12	562	6th
2017	NASCAR K&N Pro Series East	Marsh Racing	1	0	0	1	38	46th
2017	NASCAR Xfinity Series	Joe Gibbs Racing	4	1	4	4	202	29th
2018	NASCAR Whelen Modified Tour	Mike Curb	1	0	1	1	381	13th
2018	NASCAR Whelen Modified Tour	Ed Partridge	10	2	6	6	381	13th
2018	NASCAR Xfinity Series	Joe Gibbs Racing	15	1	7	10	483	21st
2019	NASCAR Whelen Modified Tour	Ed Partridge	2	0	0	0	55	49th
2019	NASCAR K&N Pro Series West	Jefferson Pitts Racing	1	0	0	0	26	59th
2019	NASCAR Xfinity Series	JR Motorsports	4	0	1	4	0	NC†
2019	Monster Energy NASCAR Cup Series	JTG Daugherty Racing	36	0	1	3	495	26th
2020	NASCAR Whelen Modified Tour	Ed Partridge	1	0	0	0	26	43rd
2020	NASCAR Cup Series	JTG Daugherty Racing	36	0	0	2	477	29th
2021	NASCAR Whelen Modified Tour	Ed Partridge	7	3	4	4	268	17th
2021	NASCAR Camping World Truck Series	David Gilliland Racing	2	1	1	2	0	NC†
2021	NASCAR Cup Series	JTG Daugherty Racing	36	0	1	4	557	27th
2021	SMART Modified Tour	N/A	2	1	1	1	58	21st
2022	SMART Modified Tour	Ryan Preece	2	0	2	2	0	NC†
2022	NASCAR Whelen Modified Tour	Ryan Preece	1	0	0	1	151	30th
2022	NASCAR Whelen Modified Tour	Jan Boehler	3	0	0	1	151	30th
2022	NASCAR Whelen Modified Tour	Lawney Tinio	1	0	0	1	151	30th
2022	NASCAR Camping World Truck Series	David Gilliland Racing	10	1	7	9	410	18th
2022	NASCAR Xfinity Series	B. J. McLeod Motorsports	3	0	1	2	0	NC†
2022	NASCAR Cup Series	Rick Ware Racing	2	0	0	0	0	NC†
2023	SRX Series	N/A	1	0	0	0	0	NC†
2023	NASCAR Whelen Modified Tour	Jeff Preece	1	1	1	1	48	54th
2023	ARCA Menards Series West	Stewart–Haas Racing	1	1	1	1	49	36th
2023	NASCAR Cup Series	Stewart–Haas Racing	36	0	1	2	637	23rd
2024	SMART Modified Tour	Curb Racing	1	0	0	0	27	50th
2024	NASCAR Whelen Modified Tour	Jeff Preece	2	0	0	0	49	52nd
2024	NASCAR Cup Series	Stewart–Haas Racing	36	0	1	5	584	26th
2025	NASCAR Whelen Modified Tour	Jeff Preece	1	0	0	1	37	53rd
2025	NASCAR Cup Series	RFK Racing	36	0	3	14	861	18th
2026	NASCAR Whelen Modified Tour	Jeff Preece	2	0	1	2	79	34th
2026	NASCAR Cup Series	RFK Racing	36	1	1	10	2226	15th

^{†} As Preece was a guest driver, he was ineligible for championship points.

=== NASCAR ===
(key) (Bold – Pole position awarded by qualifying time. Italics – Pole position earned by points standings or practice time. * – Most laps led. ** – All laps led.)

==== Cup Series ====
NASCAR Cup Series results
Year	Team	No.	Make	1	2	3	4	5	6	7	8	9	10	11	12	13	14	15	16	17	18	19	20	21	22	23	24	25	26	27	28	29	30	31	32	33	34	35	36	NCSC	Pts	Ref
2015	Premium Motorsports	98	Chevy	DAY	ATL	LVS	PHO	CAL	MAR	TEX	BRI	RCH	TAL	KAN	CLT	DOV	POC	MCH	SON	DAY	KEN	NHA	IND	POC	GLN	MCH	BRI	DAR	RCH	CHI	NHA; 32	DOV	CLT	KAN	TAL		TEX; 36		HOM; 38	44th	35	
2015	Premium Motorsports	98	Ford																																	MAR; 42		PHO; 37		44th	35	
2019	JTG Daugherty Racing	47	Chevy	DAY; 8	ATL; 35	LVS; 25	PHO; 34	CAL; 23	MAR; 16	TEX; 22	BRI; 25	RCH; 20	TAL; 3	DOV; 28	KAN; 25	CLT; 31	POC; 23	MCH; 25	SON; 29	CHI; 28	DAY; 32	KEN; 21	NHA; 21	POC; 37	GLN; 36	MCH; 7	BRI; 18	DAR; 22	IND; 16	LVS; 27	RCH; 32	ROV; 21	DOV; 19	TAL; 18	KAN; 12	MAR; 19	TEX; 23	PHO; 26	HOM; 25	26th	495	
2020	JTG Daugherty Racing	37	Chevy	DAY; 29	LVS; 37	CAL; 30	PHO; 18	DAR; 20	DAR; 39	CLT; 22	CLT; 24	BRI; 12	ATL; 26	MAR; 26	HOM; 24	TAL; 15	POC; 20	POC; 25	IND; 40	KEN; 38	TEX; 40	KAN; 34	NHA; 16	MCH; 25	MCH; 16	DRC; 23	DOV; 25	DOV; 26	DAY; 37	DAR; 17	RCH; 20	BRI; 9	LVS; 19	TAL; 10	ROV; 14	KAN; 29	TEX; 18	MAR; 19	PHO; 34	29th	477	
2021	JTG Daugherty Racing	37	Chevy	DAY; 6	DRC; 9	HOM; 21	LVS; 15	PHO; 26	ATL; 25	BRD; 18	MAR; 36	RCH; 29	TAL; 14	KAN; 32	DAR; 25	DOV; 18	COA; 15	CLT; 26	SON; 21	NSH; 32	POC; 23	POC; 8	ROA; 40	ATL; 25	NHA; 22	GLN; 28	IRC; 35	MCH; 21	DAY; 4	DAR; 12	RCH; 25	BRI; 17	LVS; 28	TAL; 32	ROV; 19	TEX; 36	KAN; 21	MAR; 36	PHO; 20	27th	557	
2022	Rick Ware Racing	15	Ford	DAY	CAL	LVS	PHO	ATL	COA	RCH	MAR	BRD	TAL	DOV; 25	DAR	KAN	CLT; 37	GTW	SON	NSH	ROA	ATL	NHA	POC	IRC	MCH	RCH	GLN	DAY	DAR	KAN	BRI	TEX	TAL	ROV	LVS	HOM	MAR	PHO	55th	0^{1}	
2023	Stewart–Haas Racing	41	Ford	DAY; 36	CAL; 33	LVS; 23	PHO; 12	ATL; 28	COA; 32	RCH; 18	BRD; 24	**MAR**; 15*	TAL; 34	DOV; 17	KAN; 27	DAR; 15	CLT; 13	GTW; 17	SON; 13	NSH; 16	CSC; 15	ATL; 24	NHA; 28	POC; 31	RCH; 5	MCH; 22	IRC; 31	GLN; 17	DAY; 31	DAR; 28	KAN; 18	BRI; 12	TEX; 23	TAL; 8	ROV; 11	LVS; 26	HOM; 13	MAR; 20	PHO; 14	23rd	637	
2024	Stewart–Haas Racing	41	Ford	DAY; 23	ATL; 16	LVS; 23	PHO; 23	BRI; 14	COA; 23	RCH; 28	MAR; 9	TEX; 12	TAL; 14	DOV; 37	KAN; 28	DAR; 17	CLT; 26	GTW; 29	SON; 18	IOW; 27	NHA; 11	NSH; 4	CSC; 34	POC; 30	IND; 26	RCH; 25	MCH; 11	DAY; 39	DAR; 12	ATL; 18	GLN; 9	BRI; 7	KAN; 16	TAL; 35	ROV; 25	LVS; 22	HOM; 10	MAR; 14	PHO; 37	26th	584	
2025	RFK Racing	60	Ford	DAY; 32	ATL; 18	COA; 33	PHO; 15	LVS; 3	HOM; 9	MAR; 7	DAR; 26	BRI; 20	TAL; 38	TEX; 29	KAN; 7	CLT; 9	NSH; 28	MCH; 9	MXC; 15	POC; 8	ATL; 15	CSC; 7	SON; 12	DOV; 19	IND; 4	IOW; 5	GLN; 13	**RCH**; 35	DAY; 14	DAR; 16	GTW; 13	BRI; 21	NHA; 14	KAN; 26	ROV; 6	LVS; 9	TAL; 15	MAR; 6	PHO; 9	18th	861	
2026	RFK Racing	60	Ford	DAY; 25	ATL; 9	COA; 18	PHO; 13	LVS; 11	DAR; 13	MAR; 12	BRI; 8	KAN; 11	TAL; 18	TEX; 14	GLN; 14	CLT; 34	NSH; 36	MCH; 28	POC; 28	COR; 11	SON; 8	CHI; 32	ATL; 24	NWS; 10	IND; 8	IOW; 20	RCH; 17	NHA; 9	DAY; 1	DAR; 10	GTW; 17	BRI; 10	KAN; 10	LVS; 28	CLT; 15	PHO; 18	TAL; 13	MAR; 23	HOM; 25	15th	2226	

===== Daytona 500 =====
Year	Team	Manufacturer	Start	Finish
2019	JTG Daugherty Racing	Chevrolet	21	8
2020	JTG Daugherty Racing	Chevrolet	31	29
2021	JTG Daugherty Racing	Chevrolet	11	6
2023	Stewart–Haas Racing	Ford	20	36
2024	Stewart–Haas Racing	Ford	25	23
2025	RFK Racing	Ford	27	32
2026	RFK Racing	Ford	19	25

==== Xfinity Series ====
NASCAR Xfinity Series results
Year	Team	No.	Make	1	2	3	4	5	6	7	8	9	10	11	12	13	14	15	16	17	18	19	20	21	22	23	24	25	26	27	28	29	30	31	32	33	NXSC	Pts	Ref
2013	Tommy Baldwin Racing	8	Chevy	DAY	PHO	LVS	BRI	CAL	TEX	RCH	TAL	DAR	CLT	DOV	IOW	MCH	ROA	KEN	DAY	NHA; 24	CHI	IND	IOW	GLN	MOH	BRI	ATL	RCH	CHI	KEN	DOV	KAN	CLT	TEX	PHO	HOM	72nd	20	
2014	Tommy Baldwin Racing	36	Chevy	DAY	PHO	LVS	BRI	CAL	TEX	DAR	RCH	TAL	IOW	CLT	DOV	MCH	ROA	KEN	DAY	NHA; 14	CHI	IND	IOW	GLN	MOH	BRI	ATL	RCH	CHI	KEN	DOV	KAN	CLT	TEX	PHO	HOM; 28	53rd	46	
2016	JD Motorsports	01	Chevy	DAY; 40	ATL; 22	LVS; 18	PHO; 21	CAL; 25	TEX; 28	BRI; 19	RCH; 23	TAL; 15	DOV; 39	CLT; 22	POC; 17	MCH; 19	IOW; 32	DAY; 34	KEN; 15	NHA; 19	IND; 25	IOW; 34	GLN; 27	MOH; 17	BRI; 15	ROA; 11	DAR; 10	RCH; 26	CHI; 17	KEN; 30	DOV; 18	CLT; 23	KAN; 32	TEX; 22	PHO; 22	HOM; 21	17th	597	
2017	Joe Gibbs Racing	20	Toyota	DAY	ATL	LVS	PHO	CAL	TEX	BRI	RCH	TAL	CLT	DOV	POC	MCH	IOW	DAY	KEN	NHA; 2	IND	**IOW**; 1*	GLN	MOH	BRI	ROA	DAR	RCH	CHI	KEN; 4	DOV	CLT	KAN	TEX	PHO		29th	202	
2017	Joe Gibbs Racing	18	Toyota																																	HOM; 5	29th	202	
2018	Joe Gibbs Racing	18	Toyota	DAY	ATL	LVS	PHO	CAL; 9	TEX; 5	BRI; 1	RCH	TAL	DOV	CLT	POC	MCH	IOW	CHI	DAY; 39	KEN	NHA; 3	IOW	GLN; 4	MOH	BRI	ROA	DAR	IND; 28	LVS; 6	RCH; 18	ROV; 4	DOV; 4	KAN; 21	TEX; 31	PHO; 5	HOM; 6	21st	483	
2019	JR Motorsports	8	Chevy	DAY	ATL; 7	LVS	PHO	CAL; 8	TEX	BRI	RCH	TAL	DOV	CLT	POC; 4	MCH	IOW	CHI	DAY	KEN	NHA	IOW	GLN; 10	MOH	BRI	ROA	DAR	IND	LVS	RCH	ROV	DOV	KAN	TEX	PHO	HOM	86th	0^{1}	
2022	B. J. McLeod Motorsports	5	Ford	DAY	CAL	LVS	PHO	ATL	COA	RCH; 16	MAR	TAL	DOV	DAR	TEX	CLT; 5	PIR	NSH; 6	ROA	ATL	NHA	POC	IRC	MCH	GLN	DAY	DAR	KAN	BRI	TEX	TAL	ROV	LVS	HOM	MAR	PHO	82nd	0^{1}	

==== Camping World Truck Series ====
NASCAR Camping World Truck Series results
Year	Team	No.	Make	1	2	3	4	5	6	7	8	9	10	11	12	13	14	15	16	17	18	19	20	21	22	23	NCWTC	Pts	Ref
2021	David Gilliland Racing	17	Ford	DAY	DRC	LVS	ATL	BRD	RCH	KAN	DAR	COA	CLT	TEX	NSH; 1	POC; 9	KNX	GLN	GTW	DAR	BRI	LVS	TAL	MAR	PHO		94th	0^{1}	
2022	David Gilliland Racing	17	Ford	DAY	LVS; 4	ATL; 7	COA	MAR	BRD	DAR; 7	KAN	TEX; 3	CLT; 11	GTW	SON	KNX	**NSH**; 1*	MOH	POC; 2	IRP	RCH	KAN; 3	BRI	TAL; 4	HOM; 4	PHO	18th	410	

^{*} Season still in progress
^{1} Ineligible for series points

==== K&N Pro Series East ====
NASCAR K&N Pro Series East results
Year	Team	No.	Make	1	2	3	4	5	6	7	8	9	10	11	12	13	14	NKNPSEC	Pts	Ref
2008	Maxie Bush	28	Ford	GRE	IOW; DNQ	SBO	GLN	NHA	THO	FAI	ADI	LIM	MFD	NHA	DOV	STA		N/A	0	
2015	Ranier Racing with MDM	41	Chevy	NSM	GRE	BRI	IOW	BGS	LGY	COL	NHA	IOW	GLN	MOT	VIR	RCH; 14	DOV	51st	30	
2016	Marsh Racing	31	Chevy	NSM; 7	MOB	GRE	BRI	VIR	DOM	STA	COL	NHA; 9	IOW	GLN	GRE	NJM	DOV	36th	72	
2017	Marsh Racing	31	Chevy	NSM	GRE	BRI	SBO	SBO	MEM	BLN	TMP; 6	NHA	IOW	GLN	LGY	NJM	DOV	46th	38	

==== Whelen Modified Tour ====
NASCAR Whelen Modified Tour results
Year	Car owner	No.	Make	1	2	3	4	5	6	7	8	9	10	11	12	13	14	15	16	17	18	NWMTC	Pts	Ref
2007	Jeff Preece	40	Chevy	TMP; DNQ	STA; DNQ	WTO; 27	STA; 11	TMP; 31	NHA; 18	TSA; 14	RIV; 10	STA; 30	TMP; 10	MAN; 17	MAR; 18	NHA; 14	TMP; 29	STA; 31	TMP; 7			19th	1573	
2008	Jan Boehler	3	Chevy	TMP; 19	STA; 29	STA; 7	TMP; 10	NHA; 8	SPE; 25	RIV; 5	STA; 18*	TMP; 24	MAN; 3	TMP; 27	NHA; 3	MAR; 1*	CHE; 18	STA; 28	TMP; 14			10th	1948	
2009	Jan Boehler	3	Chevy	TMP; 4	**STA**; 3	STA; 10	NHA; 24	SPE; 5	**RIV**; 1**	STA; 1	BRI; 3	TMP; 10	**NHA**; 3	MAR; 3	STA; 3	TMP; 2						2nd	2004	
2010	Jan Boehler	3	Chevy	TMP; 2	STA; 23	STA; 4	MAR; 16*	NHA; 3	LIM; 4	MON; 23	RIV; 2	STA; 16	TMP; 22	BRI; 8	NHA; 20	STA; 6	TMP; 2					6th	1933	
2011	John Lukosavage	11	Ford	TMP; 4	STA; 17	STA; 24	MON	TMP														22nd	1310	
2011	Jeff Preece	40	Chevy						NHA; 26			NHA; 7	BRI	DEL	**TMP**; 3	LIM	NHA; 14	STA; 2				22nd	1310	
2011	Barbara Park	20	Chevy							RIV; 4	STA											22nd	1310	
2011	Eric Sanderson	16	Ford																**TMP**; 26			22nd	1310	
2012	Eric Sanderson	16	Ford	**TMP**; 16*	**STA**; 2*	**MON**; 1**	STA; 11	WAT; 3	NHA; 12	**STA**; 6	TMP; 17	BRI; 3	**TMP**; 3*	**RIV**; 1*	NHA; 10	STA; 5	TMP; 2*					2nd	545	
2013	Eric Sanderson	16	Ford	TMP; 3	STA; 4	STA; 1	WAT; 1	RIV; 1*	NHA; 3	MON; 5	STA; 16	TMP; 13	BRI; 4	RIV; 1	NHA; 12	STA; 17	TMP; 3					1st	549	
2014	Eric Sanderson	16	Ford	TMP; 9	STA; 24	STA; 9	WAT; 6	RIV; 4	NHA; 5	MON; 2*	STA; 9	TMP; 4	BRI; 11	NHA; 12	STA; 1*	TMP; 1*						2nd	489	
2015	Ed Partridge	6	Chevy	TMP; 5	**STA**; 3*	WAT; 1*	STA; 1*	TMP; 7	RIV; 8	NHA; 6*	**MON**; 10	STA; 1*	TMP; 6	BRI; 1	RIV; 8	NHA; 19	STA; 2*	TMP; 7				2nd	602	
2016	Ed Partridge	6	Chevy	TMP; 2*	STA; 30	WAT	STA	TMP; 6	RIV; 23	NHA; 6	MON	STA	TMP; 5	BRI; 6	RIV	OSW	SEE	NHA	STA	TMP; 2		24th	277	
2017	Ed Partridge	6	Chevy	MYR; 4	TMP; 28	STA; 1	LGY	TMP; 1*	RIV; 4	**NHA**; 2*	STA; 1	TMP; 1*	BRI; 5	SEE; 3	OSW; 1	RIV; 4	NHA	**STA**; 2*	TMP; 26			6th	562	
2018	Ed Partridge	6	Chevy	MYR	TMP; 4	STA; 1*	SEE; 27	TMP; 4	**LGY**; 1*	RIV; 2	NHA; 28	STA	TMP; 23	BRI	OSW; 19	RIV			TMP; 4			13th	381	
2018	Mike Curb	77	Chevy														NHA; 5	STA				13th	381	
2019	Ed Partridge	6	Chevy	MYR	SBO	TMP	STA	WAL	SEE	TMP; 14	RIV	NHA; 19	STA	TMP	OSW	RIV	NHA	STA	TMP			49th	55	
2020	Ed Partridge	6	Chevy	JEN	WMM	WMM	JEN	MND	TMP; 19	NHA	STA	TMP										43rd	26	
2021	Ed Partridge	6	Chevy	**MAR**; 12*	STA; 17	RIV; 23	JEN	OSW; 2	RIV	NHA; 1	NRP	**STA**; 1*	BEE	OSW	RCH; 1*	RIV	STA					17th	268	
2022	Jan Boehler	3	Chevy	NSM; 10	RCH	RIV	LEE	JEN	MND	RIV	WAL							TMP; 17	MAR; 31			30th	151	
2022	Ryan Preece	40	Chevy									NHA; 6	CLM									30th	151	
2022	Lawney Tinio	44	Chevy											TMP; 6	LGY	OSW	RIV					30th	151	
2023	Jeff Preece	40	N/A	NSM	RCH	MON	RIV	LEE	SEE	RIV	WAL	NHA	LMP	THO	LGY	OSW	MON	RIV	NWS	THO	MAR; 1*	54th	48	
2024	Jeff Preece	40	N/A	NSM; 13	RCH	THO	MON	RIV	SEE	NHA; 26	MON	LMP	THO	OSW	RIV	MON	THO	NWS	MAR			52nd	49	
2025	Jeff Preece	40	N/A	NSM	THO	NWS	SEE	RIV	WMM	LMP	MON	MON	THO	RCH; 8	OSW	NHA	RIV	THO	MAR			53rd	37	
2026	Jeff Preece	40	N/A	NSM; 7	MAR	THO	SEE	RIV	OXF	SEE	CLM	WMM	MON	THO	NHA; 3	STA	OSW	RIV	THO			34th	79	

==== Whelen Southern Modified Tour ====
NASCAR Whelen Southern Modified Tour results
Year	Car owner	No.	Make	1	2	3	4	5	6	7	8	9	10	11	12	13	14	NWSMTC	Pts	Ref
2007	Jeff Preece	40	Chevy	CRW; 5	FAI	GRE	CRW	CRW	BGS	MAR	ACE	CRW	SNM	CRW	CRW			38th	155	
2012	Jodie Preece	41	Chevy	CRW	CRW	SBO	CRW	CRW	BGS; 11	BRI	LGY	THO	CRW	CLT; 2				27th	75	
2013	Jodie Preece	41	Chevy	CRW	**SNM**; 2*	SBO	CRW	CRW	**BGS**; 1**	BRI	LGY	CRW	CRW	SNM	**CLT**; 15*			20th	123	
2014	Jodie Preece	41	Chevy	CRW	SNM	SBO	**LGY**; 5	CRW	BGS	BRI	**LGY**; 9*	CRW	SBO	SNM	CRW	CRW		22nd	102	
2014	Mike Curb	98	Chevy														**CLT**; 20	22nd	102	
2015	Ed Partridge	6	Chevy	CRW; 14	**CRW**; 3				**BGS**; 2	BRI	LGY	SBO						13th	206	
2015	Mike Curb	98	Chevy			**SBO**; 1*	LGY	CRW					CLT; 2					13th	206	
2016	Ed Partridge	6	Chevy	CRW	CON; 12*	SBO	CRW	CRW	BGS	BRI	ECA	SBO	CRW					18th	81	
2016	Mike Curb	77	Chevy											CLT; 1				18th	81	

=== ARCA Menards Series West ===
(key) (Bold – Pole position awarded by qualifying time. Italics – Pole position earned by points standings or practice time. * – Most laps led.)

ARCA Menards Series West results
Year	Team	No.	Make	1	2	3	4	5	6	7	8	9	10	11	12	13	14	AMSWC	Pts	Ref
2008	Maxie Bush	28	Ford	AAS	PHO	CTS	IOW; DNQ	CNS	SON	IRW	DCS	EVG	MMP	IRW	AMP	AAS		N/A	0	
2019	Jefferson Pitts Racing	47	Chevy	LVS	IRW	TUS	TUS	CNS	SON; 20*	DCS	IOW	EVG	GTW	MER	AAS	KCR	PHO	59th	26	
2023	Stewart–Haas Racing	9	Ford	PHO	IRW	KCR	PIR	**SON**; 1*	IRW	SHA	EVG	AAS	LVS	MAD	PHO			36th	49	

=== Superstar Racing Experience ===
(key) * – Most laps led. ^{1} – Heat 1 winner. ^{2} – Heat 2 winner.

Superstar Racing Experience results
Year	No.	1	2	3	4	5	6	SRXC	Pts
2023	41	STA	STA II; 13*	MMS	BER	ELD	IRP	27th	0^{1}

=== SMART Modified Tour ===
SMART Modified Tour results
Year	Car owner	No.	Make	1	2	3	4	5	6	7	8	9	10	11	12	13	14	SMTC	Pts	Ref
2021	N/A	6	N/A	CRW	FLO	SBO; 1*												21st	58	
2021	N/A	2	N/A				FCS; 12	CRW	DIL	CAR	CRW	DOM	PUL	HCY	ACE			21st	58	
2022	Ryan Preece	40	N/A	FLO	SNM	CRW	SBO	FCS	CRW	NWS; 4	NWS; 4	CAR	DOM	HCY	TRI	PUL		N/A	0	
2024	Curb Racing	77	N/A	FLO	CRW	SBO	TRI	ROU	HCY	FCS; 17	CRW	JAC	CAR	CRW	DOM	SBO	NWS	50th	27	

Sporting positions
Preceded by Doug Coby	NASCAR Whelen Modified Tour Champion; 2013	Succeeded by Doug Coby
Achievements
Preceded by Kevin Smith	New England 900 Winner; 2025	Succeeded by Zach Walker
