= Rands (surname) =

Rands is an English surname. Notable people with this surname include:

- Bernard Rands (1934–2026), British and American classical composer
- E. M. Rands (1856–1922), American politician in the state of Washington
- Leslie Rands (1900–1972), English opera singer and actor
- Linda Rands (born 1953), English television personality and retired opera singer
- Lisa Rands (born 1975), American rock climber
- Mike Rands (born 1956), British conservation biologist
- Robert Delafield Rands (1890–1970), American agronomist and mycologist
- William Brighty Rands (1823–1882), British writer

== See also ==
- Rands, pen name and alter ego of Michael Lopp (born 1970), American webcomic creator and computer programmer
- Rand (surname)
