= Portrait of Professor Benjamin H. Rand =

1874 painting by Thomas Eakins

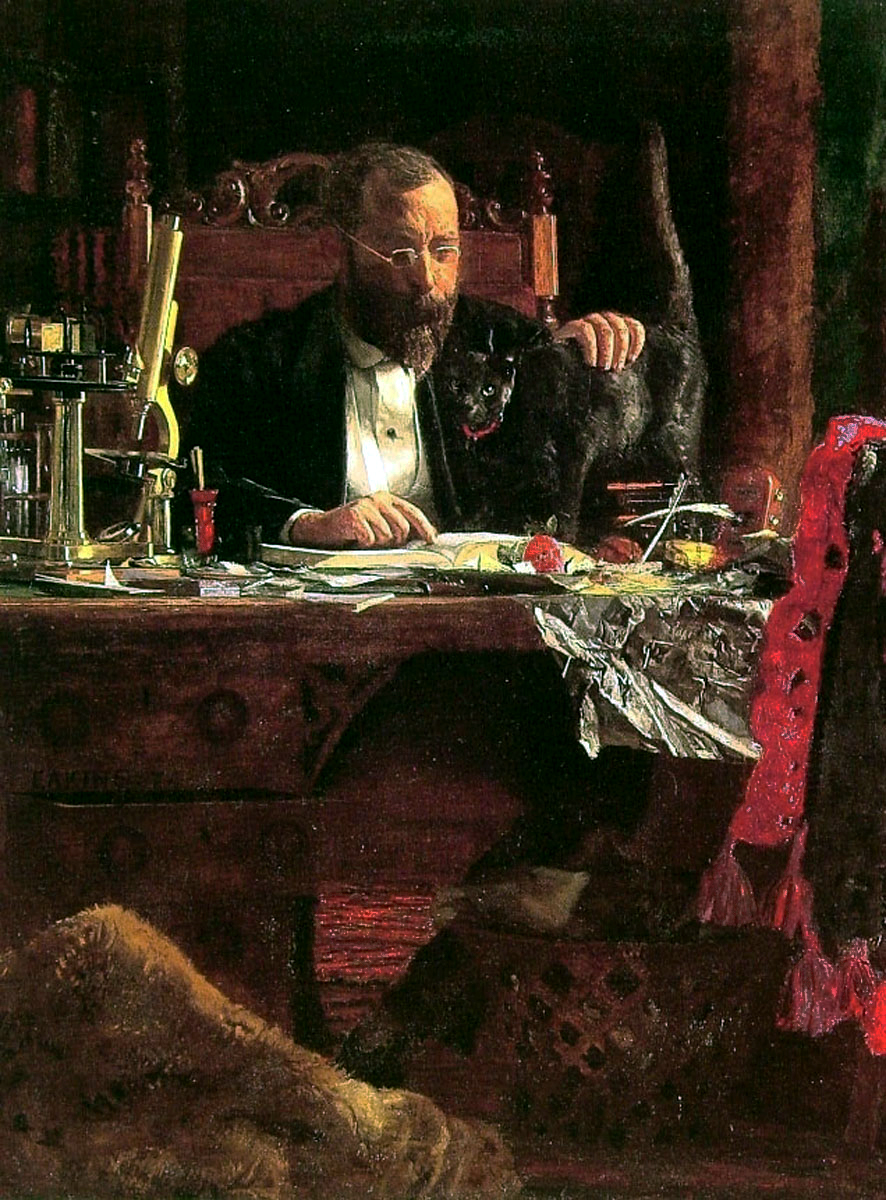
- Artist: Thomas Eakins
- Year: 1874
- Medium: oil on canvas
- Dimensions: 152 cm × 123 cm (60 in × 48 in)
- Location: Crystal Bridges Museum of American Art; Bentonville

The Portrait of Professor Benjamin H. Rand is an 1874 painting by the American artist Thomas Eakins. It is an oil on canvas that depicts Benjamin H. Rand, a doctor at Jefferson Medical College who taught Eakins anatomy. It is held at the Crystal Bridges Museum of American Art, in Bentonville, Arkansas.

== History and description ==
In the painting, Rand is sitting at the desk in his home office, which appears cluttered with both scientific and academic objects as well as everyday things, while reading a book and absentmindedly petting his cat. The doctor thus finds himself between the world of intellectual effort and home comfort.

The portrait was the first made by Eakins of someone outside of his family. It was exhibited at the 1876 Philadelphia World's Fair, where it was praised by critics. It is a prelude to what he considered his most important painting, The Gross Clinic (1875).

== Provenance ==
Rand donated it to Jefferson Medical College when he retired for health reasons in 1877. It was subsequently purchased by Alice L. Walton for an estimated US$20 million in April 2007, to be housed at the Crystal Bridges Museum of American Art.

== See also ==
- List of works by Thomas Eakins
