= Rinteln =

- Town
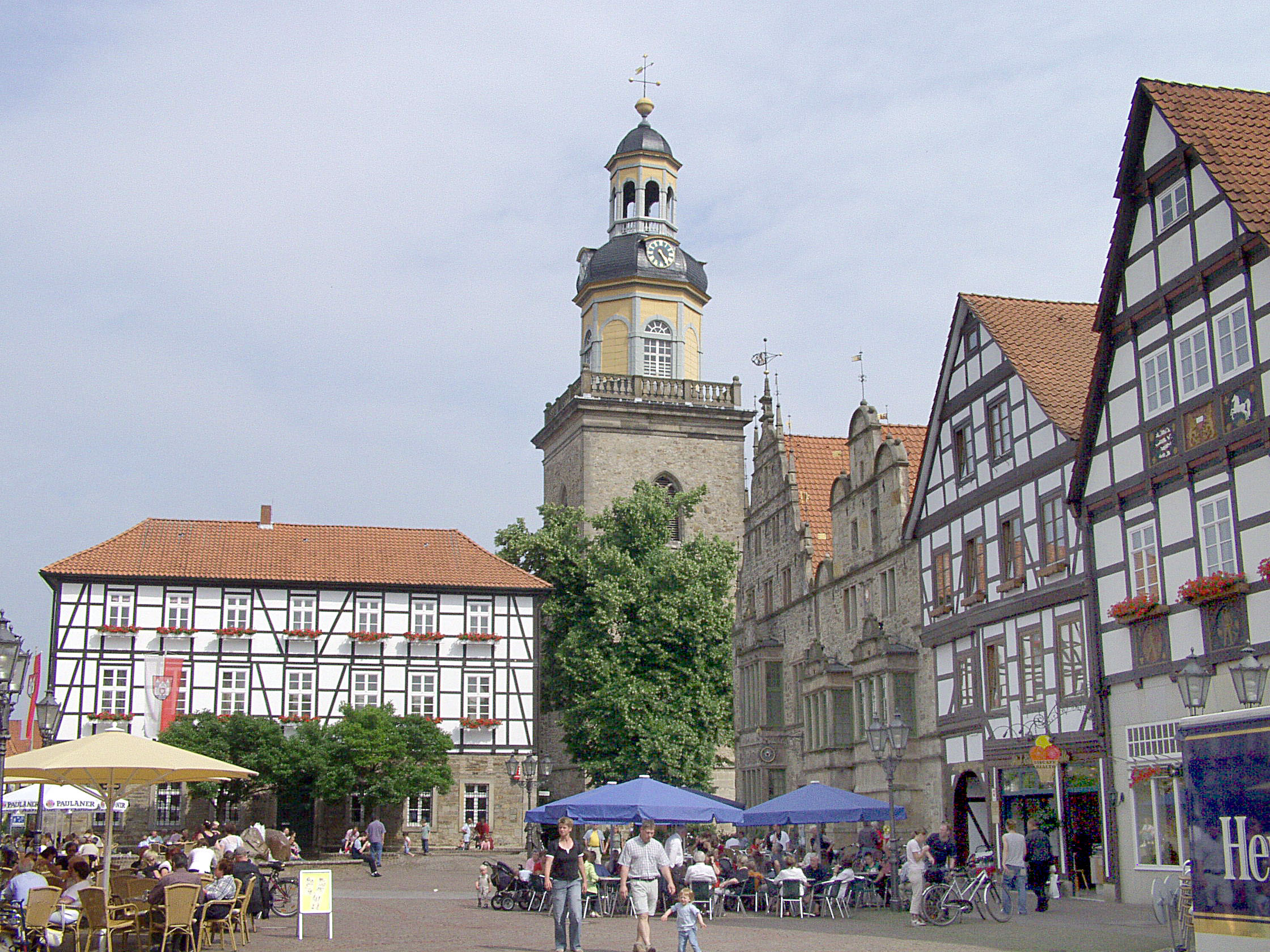

- Coat of arms

- Location of Rinteln within Schaumburg district
- Interactive map of Rinteln
- Location within Germany Location within Lower Saxony
- Coordinates: 52°11′26″N 9°4′53″E
- Country: Germany
- State: Lower Saxony
- District: Schaumburg
- Subdivisions: 10 Stadtteile

Government
  - Mayor (2021–26): Andrea Lange (Ind.)

Area
  - Total: 109.02 km^{2} (42.09 sq mi)
- Elevation: 56 m (184 ft)

Population (2025-12-31)
  - Total: 25,382
  - Density: 232.82/km^{2} (603.00/sq mi)
- Time zone: UTC+01:00 (CET)
  - Summer (DST): UTC+02:00 (CEST)
- Postal codes: 31737
- Dialling codes: 05751
- Vehicle registration: SHG, RI
- Website: www.rinteln.de

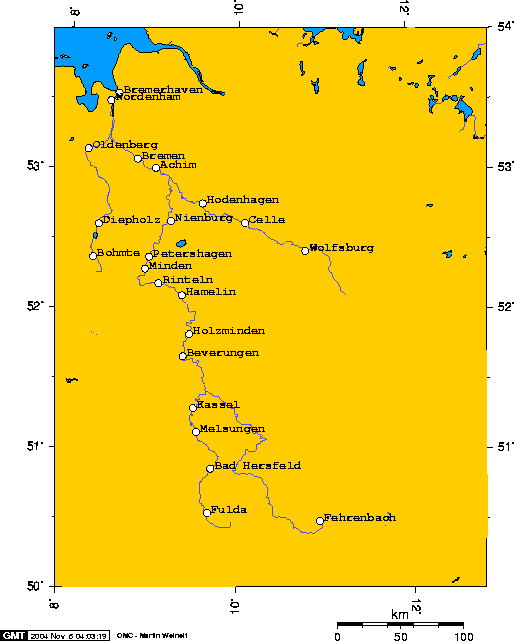
Weser watershed with Rinteln (left center)

Rinteln (German: [ˈʁɪntl̩n]) is a small town in Lower Saxony, Germany. It is located on the banks of the Weser river north of the Porta Westfalica. The town of Rinteln is in the broad valley between the hills of the Weserbergland and the North Lippe Bergland. In relation to some well known places, it is 60 kilometers west of Hanover, and just 20 kilometers from Hamelin of Pied Piper fame. Its population is about 28,500.

It is accessed by the A2 autobahn (E30).

== History ==
The settlement of Rinteln was founded about 1150 on the northern bank of the Weser. Later, in 1235, the village of Neu-Rinteln ("New Rinteln") was founded on the southern bank. It is the origin of the modern town, since the northern village was abandoned in 1350 due to the plague. The village grew to a fortified town, that served as a southern stronghold of the Counts of Schaumburg.

From 1621 until its dissolution in 1810 during the Westphalian rule under Jérôme Bonaparte, Rinteln was the seat of Ernestina University. When the County of Schaumburg was divided in 1640, Rinteln became the capital of the eastern part which retained the name Grafschaft Schaumburg hessischen Anteils. The Eulenburg in Rinteln became the seat of the counts. Rinteln remained the capital of the county and later of the district, until it was merged with the neighboring district of Schaumburg-Lippe in 1977. There was a British Forces hospital in Rinteln during the 1960s.

In 1875, the railway station was opened.

== Villages ==
- Ahe
- Deckbergen
- Engern
- Exten
- Friedrichshöhe
- Friedrichswald
- Goldbeck
- Hohenrode
- Kohlenstädt
- Krankenhagen
- Möllenbeck
- Rinteln
- Schaumburg
- Steinbergen
- Strücken
- Todenmann
- Uchtdorf
- Volksen
- Wennenkamp
- Westendorf

== International relations ==
Rinteln is twinned with:

- (United Kingdom) Kendal, Cumbria
- (Poland) Sławno, Pomerania

== Notable people ==
- Friedrich Wilhelm von Lossberg (1720–1800), a Hessian Lieutenant General fighting with the British-allied German contingents in the American Revolutionary War.
- Philip II, Count of Schaumburg-Lippe (1723–1787), a ruler of the counties of Lippe-Alverdissen and Schaumburg-Lippe.
- Diederik Lodewijk Bennewitz (1764–1826), a Dutch goldsmith, silversmith and jeweller.
- Friedrich Kohlrausch (1840–1910), physicist who investigated the conductive properties of electrolytes.
- Margrit Brückner (born 1946) a feminist German sociologist
- Cajus Julius Caesar (born 1951), politician (CDU). He served in the Bundestag three times
- Paul McGuinness (born 1951), talent manager, the manager of the rock band U2 from 1978 to 2013.
- Keith Rand RSA (1956–2013), an English wood sculptor and a Royal Scottish academician.
- Graham Coxon (born 1969), musician, singer-songwriter and painter; founding member of the rock band Blur.
- Marcus Pretzell (born 1973), politician

=== Sport ===
- Paul Casey (born 1961), former footballer who played over 450 games
- Darren Barnard (born 1971), former footballer and manager who played 609 games
- Mark Jermyn (born 1981), former footballer who played 695 games for Dorchester Town F.C.
- Michael Gash (born 1986), footballer who has played over 600 games
- Stephanie Goddard (born 1988), former footballer, played for SV Werder Bremen (women); she played over 250 games
- Julian Stöckner (born 1989), footballer who played over 230 games
