= Julian Stöckner =

German footballer

Personal information
- Date of birth: 16 March 1989 (age 37)
- Place of birth: Rinteln, West Germany
- Height: 1.89 m (6 ft 2 in)
- Position: Centre-back

Youth career
- TuS Almena
- –2004: TBV Lemgo
- 2004–2008: Arminia Bielefeld

Senior career*
Years	Team	Apps	(Gls)
2008–2011	Arminia Bielefeld II	35	(0)
2011–2012	TuS Dornberg		
2012–2014	SV Lippstadt	38	(5)
2014–2021	SC Verl	157	(7)
Total		230+	(12+)
- * Club domestic league appearances and goals

Julian Stöckner (born 16 March 1989) is a German former professional footballer who played as a centre-back.

== Career ==
Stöckner was born in Rinteln.

He has played youth football for TuS Almena, TBV Lemgo and Arminia Bielefeld and senior football with Arminia Bielefeld II, TuS Dornberg and SV Lippstadt 08 before joining his current club, SC Verl in 2014. He became club captain at SC Verl in July 2019.

Stöckner retired in July, a month after extending his contract with SC Verl, to become a policeman.
