= Paul Casey (footballer, born 1961) =

English footballer (born 1961)

Personal information
- Full name: Paul Casey
- Date of birth: 6 October 1961 (age 65)
- Place of birth: Rinteln, West Germany
- Position: Full-back

Youth career
- Sheffield United

Senior career*
Years	Team	Apps	(Gls)
1979–1982	Sheffield United	25	(1)
1982–1988	Boston United	217	(11)
1988–1991	Lincoln City	59	(4)
1991–1996	Boston United	156	(2)
1996–1999	Lincoln United		
1999–?	Wyberton		
- * Club domestic league appearances and goals

Paul Casey (born 6 October 1961) is an English former footballer who played as a full-back, making 74 appearances in the Football League for Sheffield United and Lincoln City.

== Career ==
Casey was born in Rinteln, Lower Saxony. He began his football career as an apprentice with Sheffield United, playing 25 times for the club in the league and helping the club win the Fourth Division title in 1981–82, but was then released and joined Alliance Premier League club Boston United. He played more than 250 first-team games, including an appearance in the 1985 FA Trophy final, and was the club's player of the season in 1983–84, before moving to Lincoln City in April 1988 for a £13,000 fee. He played the last ten matches of that season as Lincoln clinched the Football Conference title, and went on to make 69 first-team appearances before returning to Boston in 1991. He stayed at Boston for another five seasons, in the Conference and the Northern Premier League, then moved on to Lincoln United.

== Honours ==
Sheffield United

- Football League Fourth Division: 1981–82
