= Mark Jermyn =

Footballer (born 1981)

Personal information
- Full name: Mark Stephen Jermyn
- Date of birth: 16 April 1981 (age 45)
- Place of birth: Rinteln, West Germany
- Position: Defender

Youth career
- –1999: Torquay United

Senior career*
Years	Team	Apps	(Gls)
1999–2000	Torquay United	1	(0)
2000	Bideford	5	(0)
2000–2014	Dorchester Town	695	(28)
2014–2015	Poole Town	23	(0)
2015–2017	Dorchester Town	26	(1)

Managerial career
- 2011: Dorchester Town (joint-caretaker)
- 2015–2017: Dorchester Town (player-manager)
- * Club domestic league appearances and goals as of 1 October 2015

Mark Stephen Jermyn (born 16 April 1981) is a British former professional footballer who played as a defender.

== Career ==
Jermyn began his career as a trainee with Torquay United, making his league debut on 6 March 1999, as a substitute for Steve Tully in the 4–0 win at home to Halifax Town, while still a trainee. He turned professional in July 1999, but was released by manager Wes Saunders in February 2000 without adding to his single league appearance.

He joined Bideford in March 2000, but joined Dorchester Town in the following July. Since joining Dorchester he has been named the club's player of the year three times and has helped them to promotion from the Southern League Eastern Division and to consolidation in the Conference South.

After 11 years and 489 appearances, Jermyn was granted a testimonial match, which was played against Portsmouth on 2 August 2011.

Prior to the start of the 2014–15 Southern League Premier Division season, Jermyn signed for Poole Town.

After a spell with Poole Town, Jermyn returned to Dorchester Town as player-manager in January 2015. On 17 December 2016, it was confirmed, that Jermyn would leave the club at the new year.

== Career statistics ==
Appearances and goals by club, season and competition
Club	Season	League		Cup		Total	
Club	Season	Apps	Goals	Apps	Goals	Apps	Goals
Torquay United	1998–1999	1	0	1	0	1	0
Torquay United	1999–2000	0	0	0	0	0	0
Torquay United	Total	1	0	1	0	2	0
Bideford	1999–2000						
Dorchester Town	2000–2001	30	0	10	0	40	0
Dorchester Town	2001–2002	41	1	12	0	53	1
Dorchester Town	2002–2003	41	6	9	2	50	8
Dorchester Town	2003–2004	34	2	10	0	44	2
Dorchester Town	2004–2005	41	9	5	0	46	9
Dorchester Town	2005–2006	32	5	8	0	43	5
Dorchester Town	2006–2007	37	1	7	0	44	1
Dorchester Town	2007–2008	40	0	6	0	46	0
Dorchester Town	2008–2009	31	0	7	0	38	0
Dorchester Town	2009–2010	39	2	3	3	42	5
Dorchester Town	2010–2011	41	2	6	1	47	3
Dorchester Town	Total	407	28	78	6	493	34
