= Margrit Brückner =

German sociologist and professor

Margrit Brückner (born 1946) is a feminist German sociologist and a retired professor of the Frankfurt University of Applied Sciences. Her publications on girls and women at work, and, especially, her work on violence against women, have become core academic texts. Another of her more notable specialities involves her contributions to the international debate on (social) care.

== Life ==
Margrit Brückner was born during the aftermath of war at Mennighüffen or Rinteln, in the countryside between Bielefeld and Hannover. She studied Sociology at Mainz, Frankfurt and the London School of Economics between 1966 and 1972. In 1979 she accepted an appointment as a Professor for Sociology and Women's Studies at the Fachhochschule Frankfurt am Main (as the Applied Sciences University was then known). At Frankfurt she participated actively in the Socialist Student League. In 1969 she joined with others to establish the first "Frankfurt Women's Council" ("Frankfurter Weiberrat"), described later by one authority as "the nucleus of the Frankfurt women's movement".

As a sixteen year old she had been a beneficiary of a new schools exchange programme and spent time at a school in a small town in the United States, enabling her to improve her English language skills and acclimatize to the very different unwritten social rules governing the behaviour of school-age girls. She returned across the Atlantic after receiving her first degree, undertaking a two-year research stay at the Institute for the Study of Social Change (University of California). Brückner then received her doctorate from Frankfurt University in 1983. Adumbrating her subsequent academic career, her prize-winning dissertation was entitled "Liebe der Frauen – über das Verhältnis von Weiblichkeit und Misshandlung" (loosely "Love of women - on the relationship of the female condition and abuse"). She also trained to become group analyst and supervisor (" Gruppenanalytikerin und Supervisorin"), terms which even she has subsequently struggled to translate into English. It was again at Frankfurt University that in 2000 she received her habilitation (higher academic qualification), also receiving "Venia legendi" (loosely: "teaching rights") in Sociology. She has continued to teach and support sociology students at the Hochschule in Frankfurt up to and beyond her retirement in 2012. Her research and campaigning work has continued to focus on care-work and care-networks, along with the life situations of women working in the sexual services field.

Since 2001, with Monika Simmel-Joachim, she has chaired the working group on Domestic violence, an expert crime-prevention group established by the regional Ministry for Justice.

== Celebrations ==
- 1984 Elisabeth Selbert Prize for her doctoral dissertation, "Die Liebe der Frauen...."
- 2008 Laura Maria Bassi Prize from the Frankfurt University of Applied Sciences
- 2013 Tony Sender Prize

== Publications (selection) ==
- Die Liebe der Frauen – Über Weiblicheit und Mißhandlung. Verlag Neue Kritik, Frankfurt 1983. Zweitveröffentlichung: Fischer Taschenbuch Verlag, Reihe: Die Frau in der Gesellschaft, 1. Auflage 1988, 2. Auflage 1990, 3. Auflage 1991, ISBN 978-3-596-24708-0.
- Frauen- und Mädchenprojekte. Von feministischen Gewissheiten zu neuen Suchbewegungen. Leske + Budrich, Opladen, 2. Auflage 1998.
- Wege aus der Gewalt gegen Frauen und Mädchen. Eine Einführung. 2., veränderte Auflage, Fachhochschulverlag, Frankfurt a.M. 2002, ISBN 978-3-931297-59-6,
- produced with Lothar Bönisch: Geschlechterverhältnisse, gesellschaftliche Konstruktionen und Perspektiven ihrer Veränderung, Juventa, Weinheim/ München 2001, ISBN 978-3-7799-1368-9.
- with Christa Oppenheimer: Lebenssituation Prostitution – Sicherheit, Gesundheit und soziale Hilfen. Ulrike Helmer, Königstein 2006, ISBN 978-3-89741-205-7.

Essays

- Understanding Professional Care from the Viewpoint of Care Receivers and Care Givers – The Necessity of a Special Care Rationality. In: Social Work & Society, International Online Journal. Vol. 10, No 2 (2012) Special Issue: „Working at the Border“
- Selbst(für)sorge im Spannungsfeld von Care und Caritas. In: Mechtild Jansen and others (ed.): Selbstsorge als Themen in der (un)bezahlten Arbeit. Broschüre der Hessischen Landeszentrale für politische Bildung. 2012, S. 9–28
- Diversitätsblockaden in asymmetrischen Care Prozessen. In: Herbert Effinger and others (ed.): Diversität und soziale Ungleichheit, analytische Zugänge und professionelles Handeln in der Sozialen Arbeit. Barbara Budrich, Opladen 2012, S. 119–130

Contributions to compendia

- Care. In: Gudrun Ehlert et al. (Hrsg.): Wörterbuch Geschlecht und Soziale Arbeit. Juventa, Weinheim: 2011
- Care – Sorgen als sozialpolitische Aufgabe und als soziale Praxis. In: Hans-Uwe Otto, Hans Thiersch and others (ed.) Handbuch Sozialarbeit/ Sozialpädagogik. Ernst Reinhardt Verlag, 2011
