= Edwin Ruud =

Norwegian-American mechanical engineer and inventor

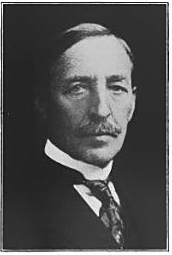
- Edwin Ruud
- Born: Edvin Ruud; June 9, 1854; Askim in Østfold, Norway
- Died: December 9, 1932 (aged 78); Pittsburgh, Pennsylvania, US
- Education: Horten Technical School (Horten tekniske skole); Vestfold, Norway
- Occupations: Mechanical Engineer; Inventor
- Spouse: Minna Kaufmann
- Engineering career
- Discipline: Mechanical Engineering
- Employers: Fuel Gas and Manufacturing Company; Ruud Manufacturing Company
- Significant design: Ruud Instantaneous Automatic Water Heater
- Awards: Louisiana Purchase Exposition Gold Medal, 1904; Edward Longstreth Medal of Merit, 1905

Signature
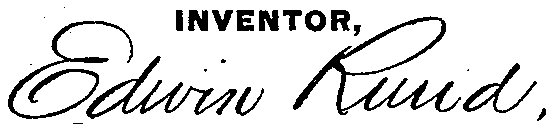

Edwin Ruud (9 June 1854 – 9 December 1932) was a Norwegian-American mechanical engineer and inventor who immigrated to the United States where he designed, sold, and popularized the tankless water heater. He was the founder and President of Ruud Manufacturing Company, now a division of Rheem Manufacturing Company.

== Biography ==
=== Early life ===
Edwin Ruud was born in the parish of Askim in Østfold, Norway. He was educated in engineering at the Horten Technical School (Horten tekniske skole) in Vestfold, Norway.

=== Fuel Gas and Manufacturing Company ===
In the 1880s, Ruud began working for George Westinghouse at the Fuel Gas and Manufacturing Company in Pittsburgh, Pennsylvania. Eight years after filing his first US patent, Ruud filed the first of five patents he would assign to Westinghouse's Fuel Gas and Manufacturing company.

In 1889, Ruud engineered a design for an automatic storage tank-type gas water heater that used a bottom gas heater and temperature controlled gas-valve. He later patented the design in 1890. In October 1890, he expanded on his first water heater design, under the Fuel Gas and Manufacturing Company.

=== Ruud Manufacturing Company ===
On January 22, 1897, Ruud filed a patent separate from the Fuel Gas and Manufacturing Company for an Automatic Water Heater. His new design consisted of a cast iron shell, enclosing burners, heating surfaces (a coil of copper tubing through which water flows), and thermostat controlling gas-valves. The object of the design improvement was, "to maintain the supply of water at the desired temperature at all times."

With this new design, Ruud left the Fuel Gas and Manufacturing Company to start Ruud Manufacturing, his own engineering and manufacturing shop where he began to manufacture and popularize in home, as well as commercial and industrial water heaters. Ruud was issued his patent for the coiled tube Automatic Water Heater on September 6, 1898.

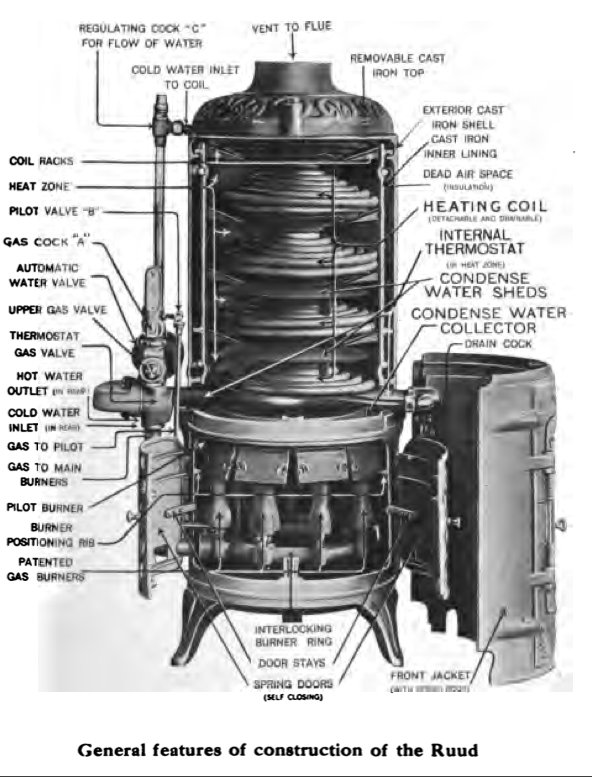
A 1915 diagram showing the innards of a Ruud instantaneous water heater

Ruud's business expanded as he popularized and improved on his instant water heater design. In 1908, Ruud Manufacturing acquired two local heating and plumbing firms. James Hay of the James Hay Company, heating and plumbing engineers, closed his business in order to operate as president of the Ruud Manufacturing Company in 1908. and J.H. Folsom of Folsom-Webster Co., heating and plumbing contracting firm, dissolved his partnership in Folsom-Webster Company in 1908 to serve as chief of the Cincinnati branch of the Ruud Manufacturing Company. By 1915, the Ruud Manufacturing Company had offices in Pittsburgh, Pennsylvania; Kalamazoo, Michigan; Toronto, Canada; and Hamburg, Germany.

=== Ruud Instantaneous Automatic Water Heater ===
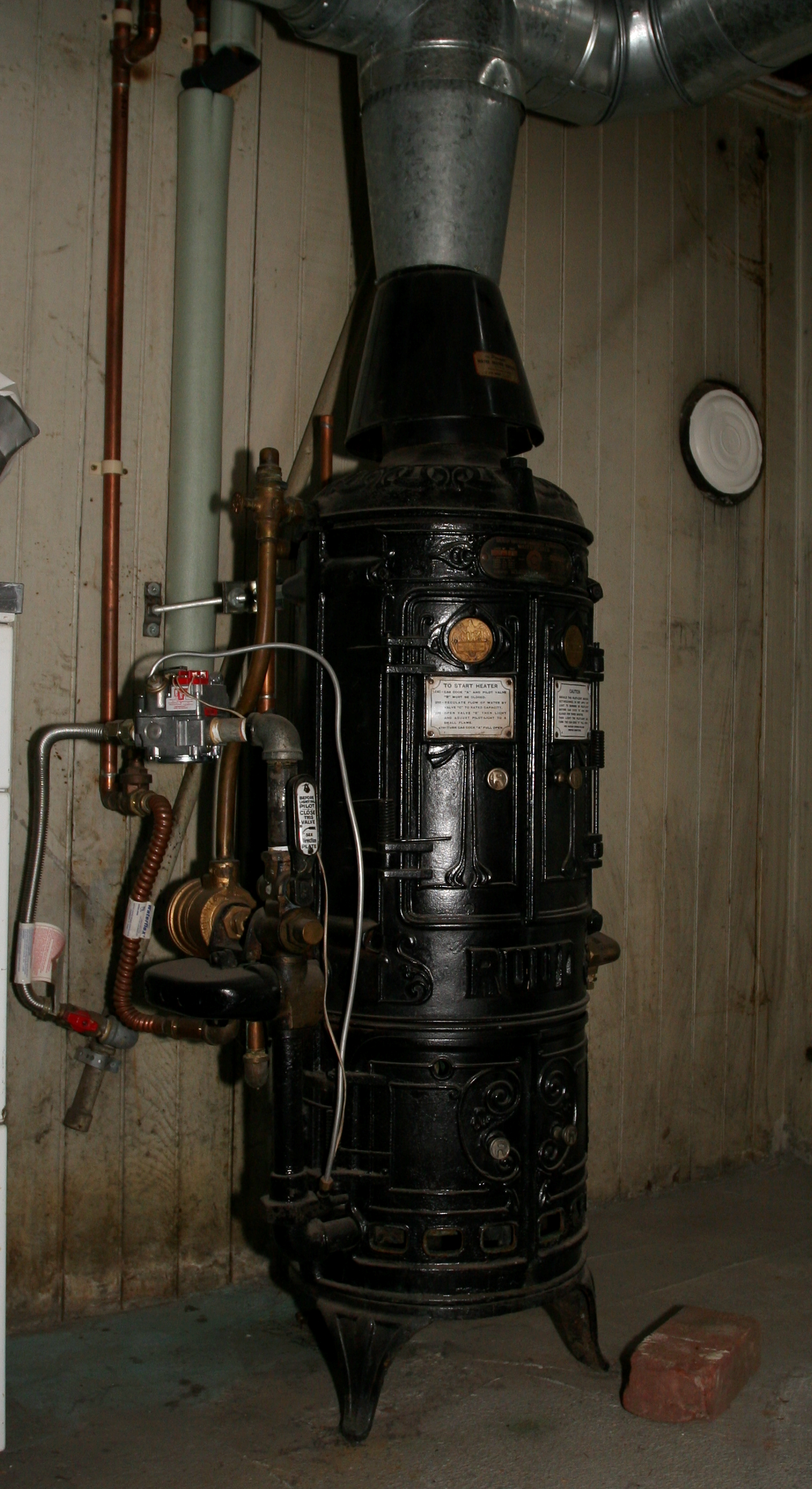
A Ruud Type F Size no. 3 instantaneous and automatic water heater from 1906

The Thermal Valve Model, Type F, of the Ruud Instantaneous Automatic Water Heater is a design that allows the user to instantaneously heat water for on demand applications while not heating, thus saving fuel, when not in use. The Type F was able to use LP gas, natural gas, and gasoline, requiring only a change of burner spud orifices, and was manufactured in two variations, the "Standard Pressure Heaters," designed to operate in conditions where pressure was at least twenty-five pounds per square inch (1.7 bar), and "Low Pressure Heaters," where operational water pressure could be as low as four pounds per square inch (0.3 bar). Thermal Valve Model, Type F heaters were manufactured in four residential sizes reflective of their output in gallons per minute: 3, 4, 6, 8. In 1915, there were approximately one-hundred-thousand of the Type F installed throughout the United States and Canada.

=== Ruud Heating and Air Conditioning Equipment ===
Edwin Ruud died in 1932 and his widow, Minna Kaufmann Ruud died in 1953. In 1959, the water heater arm of the Ruud Manufacturing Company was purchased by Rheem Manufacturing Company and continued operation as a division of Rheem.

=== Awards ===
- 1904 - Louisiana Purchase Exposition (St. Louis World’s Fair) Gold Medal for his automatic water heater
- 1905- Franklin Institute presented him with the Edward Longstreth Medal of Merit for the Ruud Instantaneous Automatic Water Heater.
- 1927 - Honorary doctorate at University of Pittsburgh
- 1929 - Appointed Knight of the Order of St Olav

=== Patents ===
- Balanced Slid-Valve: July 4, 1882 - US260612
- Stuffing Box: August 5, 1890 - US433824
- Water Heater: December 30, 1890 - US443797
- Fluid Meter: May 5, 1891 - US451881
- Water Heater: September 29, 1891 - US460513
- Automatic Steam Regulator for Gas Producers: September 6, 1892 - US482320
- Automatic Water-Heater: September 6, 1898 - US610281
- Automatic Cut-off For Gas-Service Pipes: September 10, 1901 - US682345
- Storage Water-Heater: May 14, 1907 - US853738
- Thermostatic-Valve-Operating Mechanism: December 31, 1907 - US875217
- Automatic Temperature Control for Self-heating Flat Irons: September 30, 1913 - US1074467
- Water Valve for Instantaneous Water Heaters: February 26, 1918 - US1257932
- Fluid-Mixing Apparatus: April 6, 1920 - USRE14836
