= Rheem Manufacturing Company =

American HVAC manufacturer

- Type: Private
- Industry: Plumbing, heating, and cooling
- Founded: Rheem - Richmond, California, (1925; 101 years ago); Ruud - Pittsburgh, Pennsylvania (1897; 129 years ago)
- Founder: Richard Rheem, Donald Rheem; Edwin Ruud
- Headquarters: Atlanta, Georgia, United States
- Area served: North and South America, Australasia, Middle East
- Key people: Chris Peel (CEO)
- Products: Water heaters, air conditioners, Household furnaces
- Revenue: ▲US$6 Billion (2022)
- Owner: Paloma Rheem
- Number of employees: 14,000
- Divisions: Rheem, Rheem Water, Rheem Air, Ruud, Raypak Inc, Intergas, HTPG, Friedrich Air Conditioning, De Jong, Richmond, RPD | Rheem Parts Division
- Website: www.rheem.com

Rheem Manufacturing Company is a privately held manufacturer that produces residential and commercial heating, cooling, water heating, pool & spa heating and commercial refrigeration products and solutions. The company also produces and sells products under the Ruud brand name. Rheem is headquartered in Atlanta, Georgia, and is an independent subsidiary of Paloma Industries. Chris Peel is Rheem’s president and CEO.

Rheem started in 1925 as a packaging supplier to the petroleum industry. The company also manufactures water heating and HVAC equipment in the United States. It also sells products in Argentina, Armenia, Australia, Bahrain, Chile, Brazil, Canada, Iraq, Kuwait, Mexico, New Zealand, Perú, Oman, Qatar, Saudi Arabia, Singapore, UAE, and Ukraine.

== History ==
=== 1920s-1930s ===
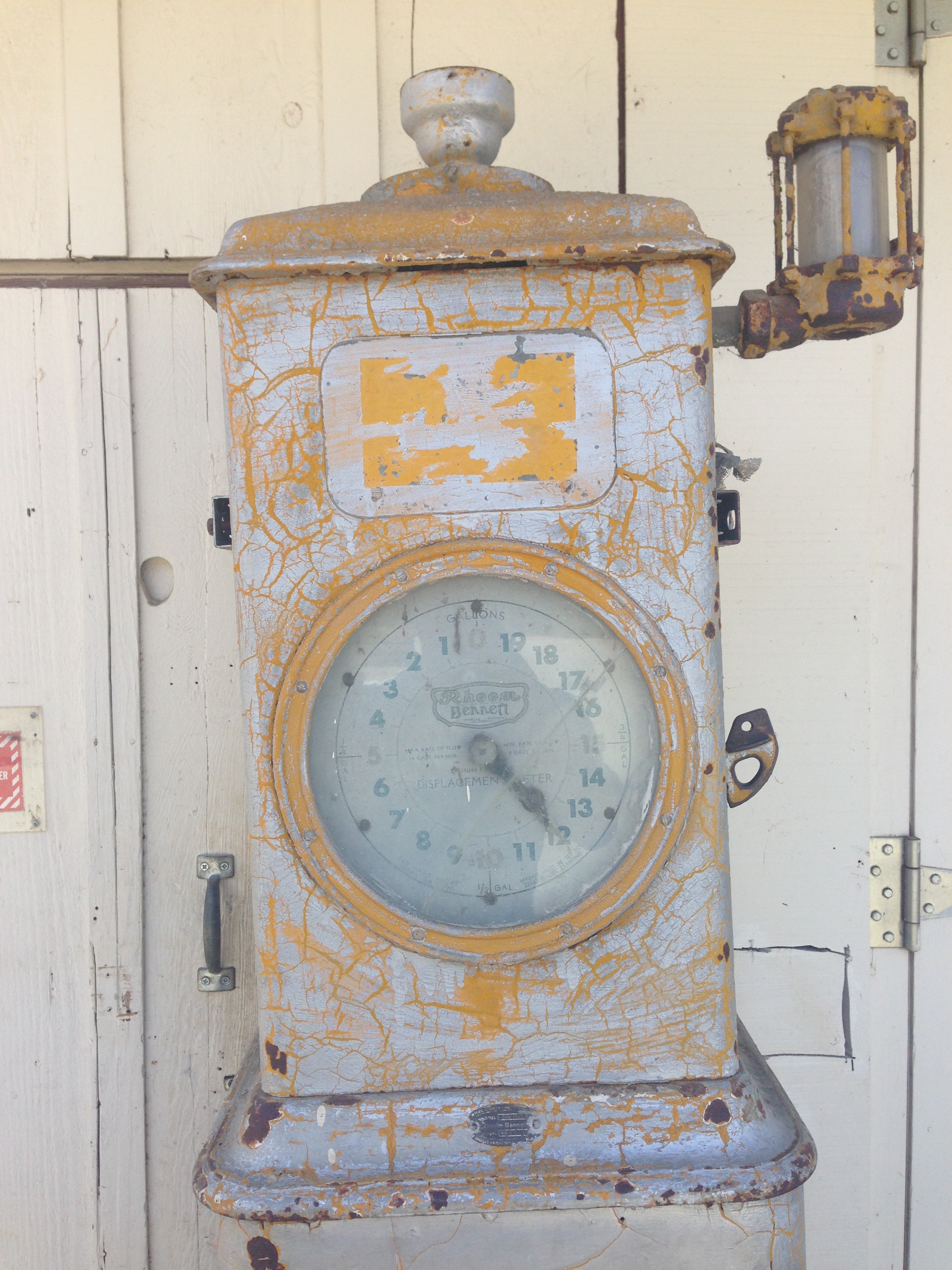
Rheem Bennett Displacement Meter at Deer Hollow Farm at Rancho San Antonio Open Space Preserve in California

Rheem is named after its founders, brothers Richard "R. S." Rheem and Donald "D. L." Rheem. A third brother, William "W.K." Rheem, helped finance the company at its start. They are the sons of William S. Rheem (1862–1919), former president of Standard Oil Company of California who led the construction of a major oil refinery for the company in Richmond, California.

The brothers began manufacturing galvanized steel drums in 1925 as a co-partnership with Pacific Galvanizing Company in Emeryville, California. The Rheem Manufacturing Company was organized on January 22, 1930, buying out Pacific Galvanizing. Rheem additionally acquired the Republic Steel package company, which also had a plant in Richmond. Republic Steel made boilers and tanks, which allowed Rheem to enter the water heating business.

=== Mid-1930s – mid-1980s ===
The company expanded overseas to Australia in 1936, building a plant in Sydney to make water heaters. In 1941, Rheem became the largest manufacturer of automatic water heaters in the United States.

During World War II, much of the company's efforts went towards wartime production, the manufacturing of shell casings, a liberty ship and aircraft parts. In 1942, Rheem Manufacturing took over a mill from Bethlehem Steel in Danville, Pennsylvania, to begin manufacturing munitions for World War II. The plant was sold to the American Steel Corporation of New York in 1946.

In 1954, Rheem introduced "glass-lining," which coated the interior of a water heater tank with porcelain to extend the life of the tank. One of the most significant events for the company came in 1956 with the introduction of "Rheemaire" central air conditioning and heating systems for homes. This eventually became one of the company's primary business areas.

In 1968 a plant was opened in Bergum (Burgum in Frisian) in the Netherlands. The plant was successful but had to close its doors by the end of 1983.

Beginning in August 1970, Rheem began producing Heat pumps and HVAC units for residential applications based in Fort Smith, Arkansas. In 1983, Rheem introduced the Richmond Water Heaters brand, positioned to sell at hardware stores and home improvement centers.

=== 1984-2007 ===
In 1984, Rheem was acquired by Pace Industries, Inc. The company discontinued its container line in 1985, ending 60 years of making steel drums and other containers.

In 1987, it was reported that MLX Corporation would acquire Rheem for a reported $825 million. That deal crashed, however, with the collapse of the stock market, and in 1988, Pace Industries, the parent company of Rheem, was purchased by Paloma Ltd., a privately held Japanese company with headquarters in Nagoya, Japan, which wished to expand globally.

Rheem was the first residential HVAC company to begin using scroll compressors throughout their lineup in 1994, and air conditioners and heat pumps continue to use Copeland Scroll Compressors. Rheem was also the first to introduce a 14 SEER remote condensing unit in 1997. In 1998, the company began supplying the Home Depot with a line of GE branded water heaters.

=== 2008-2018 ===
J.R. Jones succeeded I.S. Farwell as company president and CEO in March 2008.

Rheem's market share of the central air conditioner market had been as high as 16% in the 1980s and dropped to about 11% by 2000. By 2008, a report by the United States Department of Energy ranked the firm as fifth in the US in the central air conditioner and heat pump market with a 12% market share, while in the residential gas furnace market as of 2008, the company was also ranked fifth with a 12% market share.

In 2009, Rheem and Ruud were the first to sell a Hybrid Heat Pump Water Heater, which was more than twice as efficient as similar electric water heaters. Also in the same year, Rheem and Ruud central air conditioners were reported to have the fewest percentage of units requiring repair among all major HVAC brands according to Consumer Reports.

Chris Peel was promoted to president and CEO in June 2018.

=== 2019-present ===
In 2019, Rheem Manufacturing announced sustainability goals for its manufacturing processes, products, and plants it wanted to achieve by its 100th anniversary in 2025.

In 2022, the company received two GOOD DESIGN Awards. In August of that year, the company was named an Eco-Leader by Green Builder Media for the fifth year in a row.

In 2023, the company won awards from the IoT Breakthrough Awards and Good Design. In April of that year, the company won a silver and bronze medal at the internationally recognized 2023 Edison Awards. Then in August 2023, Rheem was recognized as an eco-leader for the sixth consecutive year by Green Builder magazine.

In 2024, Rheem released its sixth annual sustainability report. The report detailed Rheem’s progress toward reducing GHG emission rates and moving its manufacturing sites to a Zero Waste to Landfill status. Also that year, Rheem Manufacturing was named the ENERGY STAR Partner of the Year, an award it has received for four consecutive years. In July of that year, Rheem's Fort Smith facility highlighted its sustainability initiatives, which include reducing energy consumption and minimizing waste. In July 2024, Rheem donated $10,000 to Habitat for Humanity International headquartered in Atlanta. In September at the Sustainability Innovation Awards, Rheem was awarded the Sustainable Heating, Ventilation, and Air Conditioning (HVAC) Product of the Year for Rheem Manufacturing Middle East for their ducted inverter air-conditioning units. In September 2024 and 2025, Rheem employees packed meals for the 9/11 Day Meal Pack program that honors the 9/11 National Day of Service and Remembrance. In October, the company established a regional headquarters in Saudi Arabia and opened its 27th Innovation Learning Center (ILC) in the country. Through the ILCs, Rheem offers hands-on training to meet regional sustainability needs. In December 2024, the company partnered with Plumbing Express to donate water heaters across Sarasota. This was part of a hurricane relief initiative.

In 2025, Rheem celebrated its one hundredth anniversary. As part of the celebration, Rheem partnered with Habitat for Humanity to build a home for a military veteran in Atlanta. In February, Rheem was included as one of Forbes America’s Best Large Employers. In March 2025, Rheem was included on Newsweek’s list of the Most Trustworthy Companies in America. In May 2026, Rheem partnered with Habitat for Humanity to provide HVAC and water heating systems along with volunteers for the 2026 Jimmy and Rosalynn Carter Work Project.

== Acquisitions ==
1960

- Ruud Manufacturing Company

1969

- National Heater Company

1985

- Raypak

2002

- Southcorp Holdings

2005

- Solahart

2013

- Heat Transfer Products Group (HTPG): producer of the Russell, Witt, ColdZone, and Kramer commercial refrigeration brands

2014

- CEM SA (based in Chile)
- Eemax Inc.: manufacturer of tankless water heaters

2017

- Grupo Industrial Saltillo’s (GIS) water heating business

2019

- Intergas, a manufacturer of high-efficiency gas boilers and water heaters (acquired through Paloma Rheem Global Inc.)

2021

- Friedrich Air Conditioning

2022

- DEJONG, an independent manufacturer and supplier of stainless steel hot water tanks headquartered in the Netherlands

2024

- Rheem acquired Nortek Global HVAC

== Brands and products ==
Rheem Manufacturing Company manufactures heating, cooling, water heating, pool & spa heating, and commercial refrigeration products under a family of almost 50 brands. These include Rheem (air conditioning, heating, and water heating), Ruud (air conditioning and heating), Friedrich (air conditioning), Raypak (pool and spa heating and commercial boilers), Eemax (electric tankless water heaters), WeatherKing (air conditioning and heating), Richmond (water heaters), Sure Comfort (air conditioning and heating), HTPG (Heat Transfer Products Group, manufacturer of commercial refrigeration brands such as Witt, ColdZone, and Kramer), and Intergas (high-efficiency gas boilers and water heaters).

Rheem and Ruud produce and sell a wide range of heating and cooling products for homes and businesses, including high-efficiency gas and oil furnaces, air conditioners up to 20 SEER, heat pumps, thermostats, air handlers, and indoor air quality products such as media filters, UV lamps, and humidifiers.

In Australia, Solarhart, which trades in solar hot water, solar power, and battery storage systems, is owned by Rheem Australia. Around the world, companies sell numerous types of water heating equipment, under the Rheem, Ruud, Richmond, Paloma, Splendid, and GE brands.

Swimming pool-related products include gas-fired and heat pump heaters sold under the Rheem and Raypak brands. Protech replacement parts for HVAC systems are sold through the PROSTOCK retail program. Rheem Parts Division, launched in 2001, sells replacement parts for HVAC systems.

=== Ruud ===
Ruud was founded by Edwin Ruud (1854–1932), a Norwegian immigrant who lived in Pittsburgh, Pennsylvania. He developed the first automatic storage tank gas-fired water heater, which went into production in 1889. Ruud worked for George Westinghouse (1846–1914), but eventually bought the rights to produce the product he invented and formed his own company in 1897. In 1913, Ruud merged and absorbed the Humphrey Company of Kalamazoo, Michigan, which also manufactured water heaters. The Humphrey Company had a large manufacturing operation in Kalamazoo, which Ruud continued to operate and expand. In 1954, Ruud moved all operations from Pittsburgh to Kalamazoo, where they were headquartered until the purchase by Rheem in 1960.

== NASCAR ==
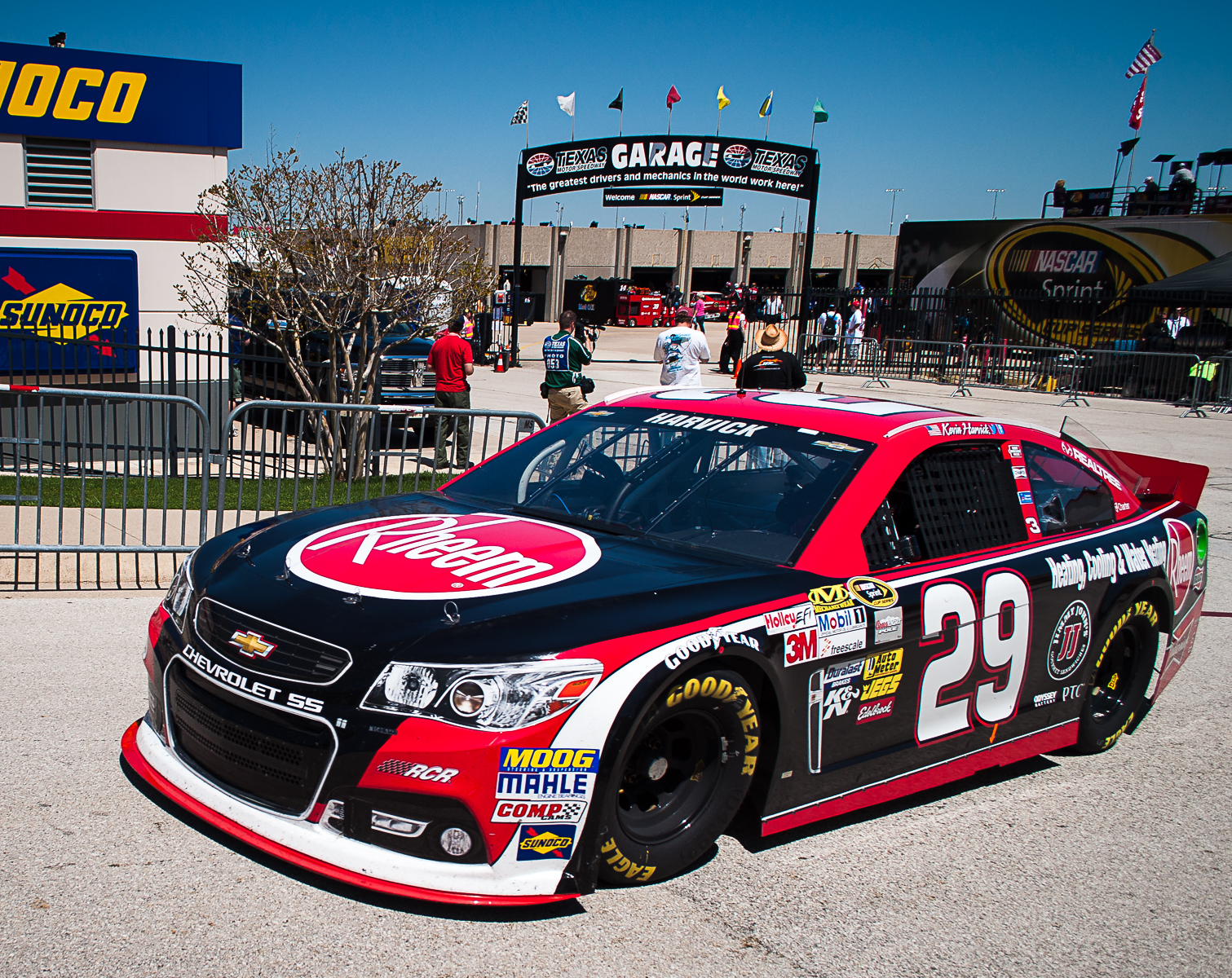
The Rheem-sponsored car of Kevin Harvick in 2013

The Rheem Racing program began in 2007. Their first sponsorship was with Kevin Harvick and his racing team/company, Kevin Harvick Incorporated (KHI). In 2012, Kevin Harvick would merge his company (KHI) with Richard Childress Racing. In 2013, Kevin Harvick would leave RCR, and Rheem would continue to sponsor RCR with drivers such as Ron Hornaday Jr., Cale Gale and other former RCR & KHI drivers in the Cup, Xfinity, and Camping World Truck Series.

In 2017, Rheem Manufacturing Company was named the official heating and cooling provider for the Sonoma and Pocono Raceways.

In 2018, Rheem joined Joe Gibbs Racing with Ryan Preece & Christopher Bell for 36 races. Rheem was also an associate sponsor to the No. 18. Cup car driven by Kyle Busch. Rheem would continue to sponsor Bell in the NO. 95 Leavine Family Racing Toyota Camry in the Cup Series in 2020.

In 2022, Rheem and Kevin Harvick would reunite to commemorate Rheem’s 15th anniversary in racing. Rheem partnered with Harvick and the No. 4 team for three NASCAR Cup Series races.

In February 2024, the company announced its sponsorship of Andrew “Bubba” Pollard in the NASCAR Xfinity Series debut.

In 2025, Rheem continued to sponsor the Joe Gibbs racing team and driver Christopher Bell.

They formerly sponsored James Buescher in the Xfinity Series and Truck Series. Brandon Jones, the son of former Rheem CEO J.R. Jones, currently competes in the Xfinity Series.

== Former divisions ==
Rheem Califone manufactured audiovisual equipment under the Rheem, Califone, and Roberts brands. These were used in schools and institutions, and included public address systems, reel-to-reel audio tape recorders, phonographs, and Combo organs. Rheem and Ruud also sold re-branded Briggs & Stratton residential Emergency power systems beginning in 2007.
