= Keith Rand =

British sculptor (1956–2013)

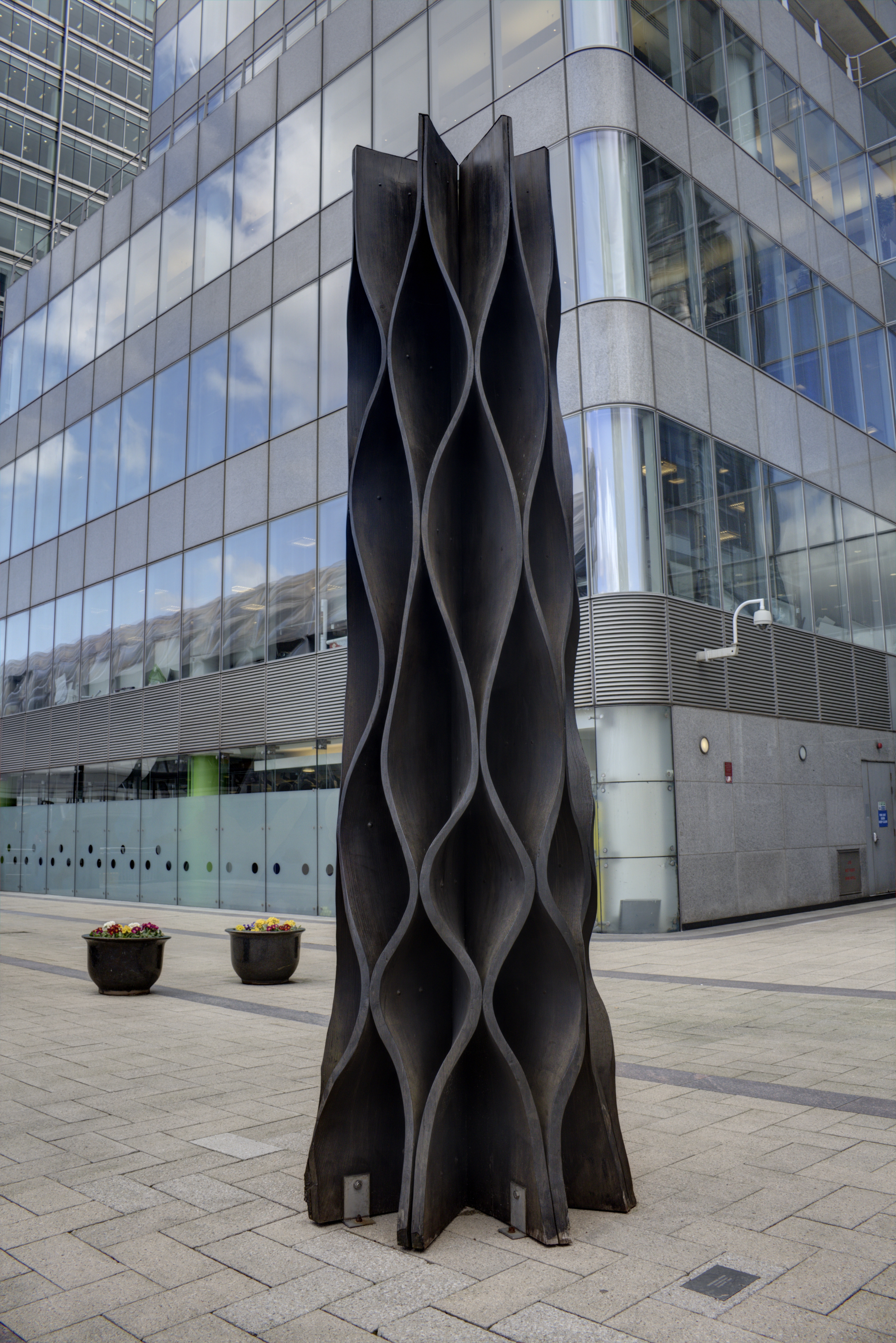
Original Form (1999) at Canary Wharf, London

Keith Rand RSA (25 October 1956 – 17 March 2013) was an English wood sculptor and a Royal Scottish academician.

Born in Rinteln, West Germany, the son of a lieutenant colonel of the British Army and the second of four children, Rand had a military childhood, before entering Woodroffe School as a boarder at the age of 13. On leaving he trained as a cartographic surveyor for the Ordnance Survey, Southampton, before enrolling in 1979 at the Winchester School of Art and graduating in 1982 with first class honours. Around this time his first solo show, Sculpture In The Woods, was held at the Crabwood Nature Reserve, Winchester.

After leaving Winchester, Rand worked as a part-time sculpture technician for the Scottish Sculpture Workshop in Lumsden as well as teaching at the Gray's School of Art in Aberdeen from 1987 to 1991. His contribution to contemporary sculptural practice in Scotland and internationally was recognised through the many awards he received. In 1996 he was made an associate of the Royal Scottish Academy.

From 1996 to 1998 he was artist in residence at Cannington Agricultural College in Somerset, creating a series of landscape structures for the River Parrett Trail. Following a visit to Japan in 1998, where he developed his "original form" motif, he established a studio at Clarendon Park near Salisbury.

In 1999 one of his largest public works, standing more than four metres high, was bought for Canary Wharf. He went on to create a series of tensile carvings that were exhibited in his first solo exhibition in London, with the Stephen Lacey Gallery. It was at this time that he was invited to develop a concept carving Ridgeline for Sculpture at Goodwood, which was exhibited at the Guggenheim in Venice in 2002.

In 2005 he was made a Royal Scottish academician, and moved to Cranbourne Chase in Dorset. His later sculpture commissions included: By The Downs for ArtCare, Salisbury District Hospital; In The Balance for the Brecklands in Norfolk; Heartwood for Bournemouth University; and The Grain for Sainsbury's in Edinburgh .
