= Westendorf (Rinteln) =

- Ortsteil of Rinteln
- Interactive map of Westendorf
- Location within Germany Location within Lower Saxony
- Coordinates: 52°12′13″N 9°08′49″E
- Country: Germany
- State: Lower Saxony
- District: Schaumburg
- Town: Rinteln
- Time zone: UTC+01:00 (CET)
  - Summer (DST): UTC+02:00 (CEST)
- Postal codes: 31737
- Dialling codes: 05751

Westendorf (German pronunciation: [ˈvɛstn̩ˌdɔʁf]) is a village in the town of Rinteln, in the Lower Saxon district of Schaumburg.

== Geography and Transportation ==
The village is east of the main core of Rinteln. The Weser flows along the southern border. To the west, north, and east is the 452 hectare Wesergebirge Ridge Naturschutzgebiet.

Along the southern edge of town runs the B 83, and along the northern edge is the A 2.
