= Ruud =

Ruud and Rud are surnames of Norwegian origin. Both are also Norwegian place names of numerous farmsteads named Rud or Ruud from Old Norse ruð meaning clearing. Ruud is also a Dutch masculine given name meaning "famous wolf" although it is also often short for Rudolf.

== Ruud ==
- Asbjørn Ruud (1919–1986), Norwegian ski jumper
- Barrett Ruud (born 1983), American football linebacker
- Birger Ruud (1911–1998), Norwegian ski jumper
- Bo Ruud (born 1984), American football linebacker
- Casper Ruud (born 1998), Norwegian tennis player
- Christian Ruud (born 1972), Norwegian tennis player
- David Ruud (born 1980), Swedish motorcycle speedway rider
- Edwin Ruud (1854–1932), Norwegian-American mechanical engineer and inventor
- Espen Ruud (born 1984), Norwegian football defender
- Joseph Ruud (born 1981), American professional wrestler better known as (Erick) Rowan
- Maria Ruud (born 1960), American politician and a member of the Minnesota House of Representatives
- Millard Ruud (1917–1997), legal scholar
- Ole Ruud (born 1958), Norwegian conductor
- Roger Ruud (born 1958), Norwegian ski jumper
- Sif Ruud (1916–2011), Swedish film actress
- Sigmund Ruud (1907–1994), Norwegian ski jumper
- Tom Ruud (born 1953), American professional football player
- William Ruud (born 1952), American educator, president of University of Northern Iowa

== Rud ==
- Adolf Rüd, Hauptscharführer in the Waffen SS during World War II
- Jon Rud (born 1986), Danish swimmer who participated at the 2008 Summer Olympics
- Nils Johan Rud (1908–1993), Norwegian novelist, writer of short stories children's writer, and magazine editor
- Ove Rud (1923–2007), Danish film actor

== Given name ==
- Ruud Boffin (born 1987), Belgian footballer
- Ruud Brood (born 1962), Dutch footballer
- Ruud de Wild (born 1969), Dutch radio host
- Ruud Geels (1948–2023), Dutch footballer
- Ruud Gullit (born 1962), Dutch footballer
- Ruud Hesp (born 1965), Dutch football goalkeeper
- Ruud Heus (born 1961), Dutch footballer
- Ruud Janssen (born 1959), Dutch blogger
- Ruud Jolie (born 1976), Dutch musician
- Ruud Kaiser (born 1960), Dutch footballer
- Ruud Kleinpaste (born 1952), New Zealand TV presenter
- Ruud Knol (born 1981), Dutch footballer
- Ruud Krol (born 1949), Dutch footballer
- Ruud Kuijten (born 1973), Belgian badminton player
- Ruud Lubbers (1939–2018), Dutch Prime minister
- Ruud Misdorp (born 1952), Dutch water polo player
- Ruud Stokvis (born 1943), Dutch rower
- Ruud van Nistelrooy (born 1976), Dutch footballer
- Ruud Vormer (born 1988), Dutch footballer

== Other ==
- Ruud Heating, Cooling & Water Heating, a division of Rheem Industries

== See also ==
- Rudolph (disambiguation)
