= Benjamin H. Rand =

American physician and academic

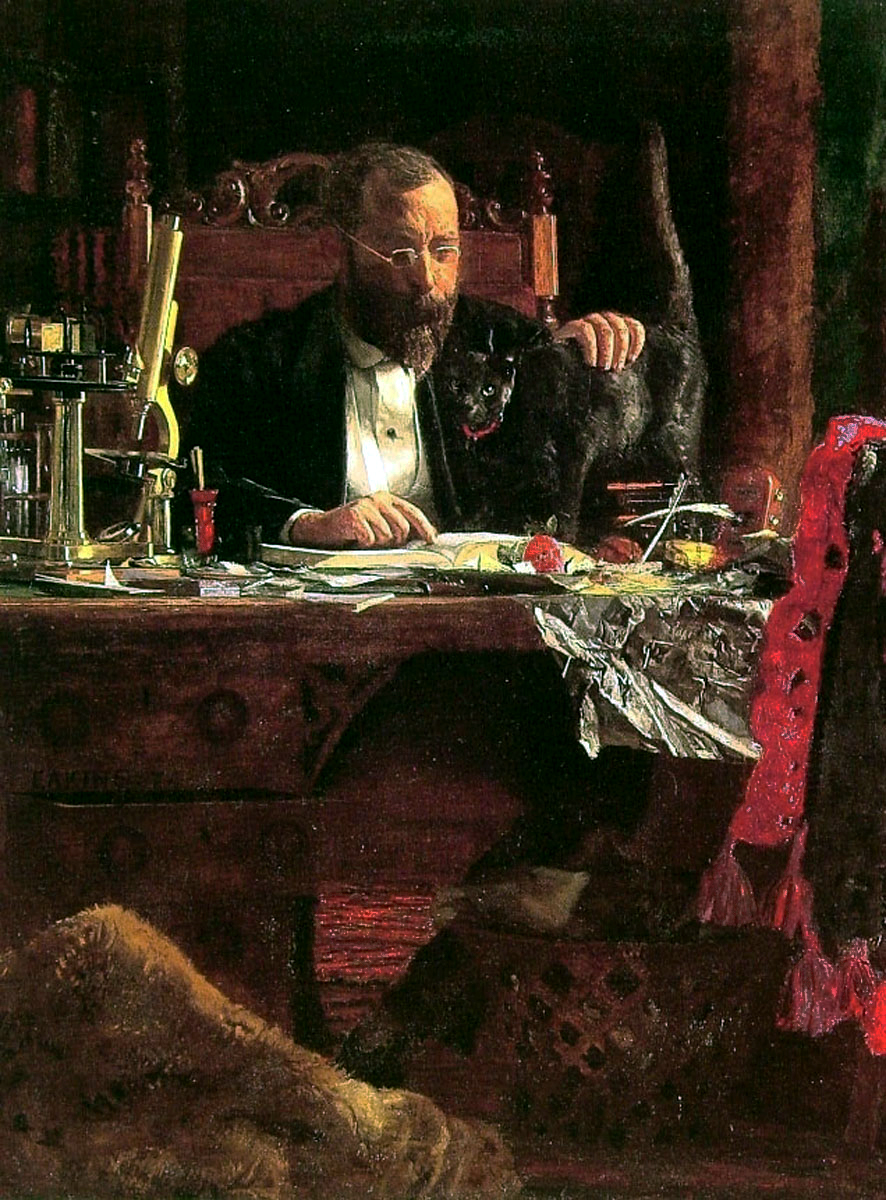
Benjamin H. Rand in Portrait of Professor Benjamin H. Rand by Thomas Eakins

Benjamin Howard Rand (October 1, 1827 – February 14, 1883) was an American academic medical doctor at Jefferson Medical College. He is depicted in Portrait of Professor Benjamin H. Rand, an 1874 painting by Thomas Eakins. It is oil on canvas and depicts Rand reading a book while petting a cat.

== Background ==
Rand was born in Philadelphia and graduated from Jefferson in 1848. Rand had taught Eakins high school chemistry. From 1852 to 1864, Rand was secretary to the Academy of Natural Sciences. Rand later became the chair of chemistry at the Franklin Institute, the Philadelphia Medical College until its closure in 1861, and served as Dean of Jefferson Medical College from 1864 to May 1877. He retired at the age of fifty for health reasons.

In April 2007, the portrait of Rand was purchased by Alice L. Walton for an estimated US$20 million and will be housed at the Crystal Bridges Museum of American Art.
