= Fennec =

Fennec or Fennek may refer to:

== Arts and entertainment ==
- Fennec (DJ), an American DJ and producer
- Fennec (TV series), a French 1998 cartoon series
- Fennec Shand, a bounty huntress in the Star Wars universe
- Silas Fennec, a character in China Miéville's novel The Scar

== Science ==
- Fennec (climate program), a climate program in the central Sahara
- Fennec fox, a small nocturnal fox found in the Sahara desert

== Other uses ==
- Fennec, a fork of the Firefox for Android web browser
- Les Fennecs, a nickname for the Algeria national football team

== Military vehicles ==
- T-28S Fennec, a variant of the T-28 Trojan piston-engined aeroplane
- Eurocopter Fennec, a lightweight helicopter
- LGS Fennek, a four-wheeled armed reconnaissance vehicle
