= J. Timmons Roberts =

American sociologist

J. Timmons Roberts is an American sociologist, currently the Ittleson Professor of Environmental Studies at Brown University and formerly the James Martin 21st Century Professor of Environmental Change Institute, Oxford University and Chancellor professor at College of William and Mary.
