= Jan Rosenow =

Professor of energy and climate policy

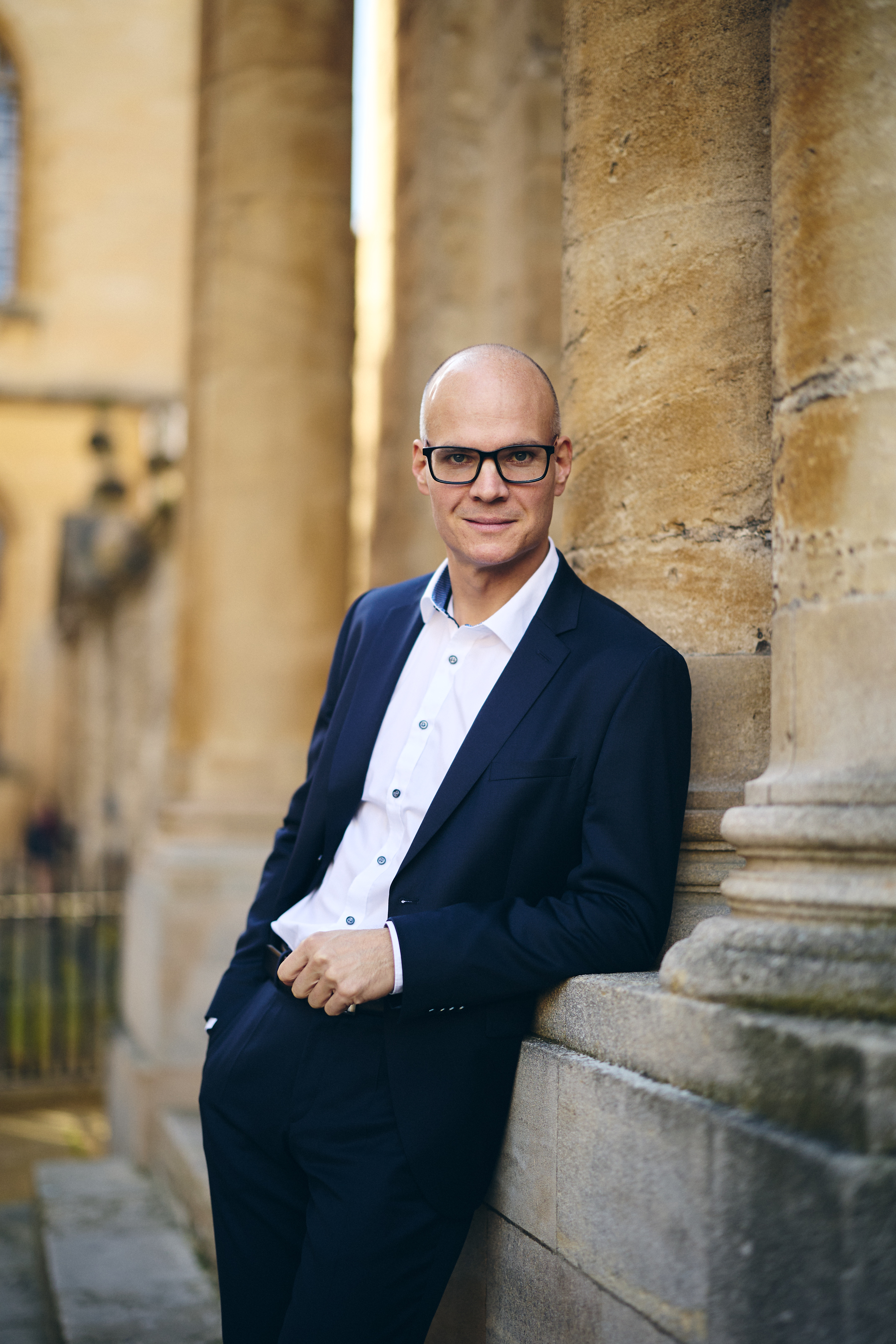
- Rosenow in 2025
- Born: 1979 (age 46–47)
- Awards: Fellow, Royal Society of Arts; Fellow, Energy Institute

Academic background
- Education: St Hilda's College, Oxford; London School of Economics; University of Münster
- Thesis: Politics of Change: Energy Efficiency Policy in Britain and Germany (2013)

Academic work
- Institutions: University of Oxford; Environmental Change Institute; Oriel College, Oxford; Cambridge Institute for Sustainability Leadership, University of Cambridge; University of Sussex
- Main interests: Energy policy, energy efficiency, electrification, renewable energy, decarbonisation

Jan Rosenow is a British-German academic who is Professor of Energy and Climate Policy at the University of Oxford. He leads the Energy Programme at the Environmental Change Institute and serves as a Jackson Senior Research Fellow at Oriel College, Oxford. He is also a Senior Associate at the Cambridge Institute for Sustainability Leadership at the University of Cambridge and Affiliate Faculty at the University of Sussex.

Rosenow's research spans energy demand, energy efficiency, electrification and climate policy. He has published over 150 peer-reviewed articles. He appears in Stanford University's database of the top 2% most cited scientists worldwide and ranked in the top 0.25% in the energy subfield for citation impact in 2025. He has advised organisations including the World Bank, the World Economic Forum and the International Energy Agency, and has provided expert testimony to both the UK Parliament and the European Parliament.

His work has been featured in The New York Times, The Economist and The Guardian.

== Early life and education ==
Rosenow was born in 1979, he grew up in Lemgo, Germany where he founded a local environmental group at the age of eight. He went on to study Geosciences at the University of Münster, graduating with a Diplom. He then completed an MSc in Environmental Policy at the London School of Economics.

In 2009, Rosenow began a doctorate in energy policy at the University of Oxford's School of Geography and the Environment, where he was a member of St Hilda's College. His thesis, Politics of Change: Energy Efficiency Policy in Britain and Germany, supervised by Nick Eyre and Miranda Schreurs, was submitted in 2013. He completed executive training at the University of Cambridge and the Florence School of Regulation.

== Career ==
In June 2015, Rosenow joined the Centre on Innovation and Energy Demand and SPRU (Science and Technology Policy Research Unit) at the University of Sussex as a Senior Fellow, while also holding Honorary Research Associate positions at the Environmental Change Institute at the University of Oxford and at the Freie Universität Berlin's Environmental Policy Research Centre.

Rosenow also conducted research at Lawrence Berkeley National Laboratory in the summer of 2012, the Wuppertal Institute for Climate, Environment and Energy and the Öko-Institut. He taught in nature, society and environmental policy at the School of Geography and the Environment and in economics and policy of energy and the environment at University College London's Energy Institute. His research focuses on energy demand, energy efficiency, electrification, renewable energy, and energy and climate policy.

Rosenow served as vice president and European Programme Director at the Regulatory Assistance Project (RAP), a global non-profit organisation working on energy and climate policy, later continuing as a Senior Advisor to RAP through a collaboration with the Environmental Change Institute (ECI).

In March 2025, Rosenow was appointed Energy Programme Lead at the ECI and Jackson Senior Research Fellow at Oriel College, Oxford, returning to the department where he completed his doctorate. The position is supported by the Frank Jackson Foundation, a grant-giving trust funding research on energy systems, conservation and the environment. He is also a Visitor at the ZERO Institute (Zero-carbon Energy Research Oxford) at the University of Oxford. After only 3 months in post, on 18 July 2025, he was conferred the title of Professor of Energy and Climate Policy by Oxford's Vice-chancellor, Irene Tracey.

== Research ==
Rosenow's research focuses on energy demand, energy efficiency and the decarbonisation of heating systems, spanning energy efficiency policy, heat pump deployment and the role of hydrogen in building decarbonisation.

=== Energy efficiency policy ===
Rosenow has examined energy efficiency obligations, schemes that require energy suppliers to deliver energy savings at the customer end. In an early study he traced the evolution of the United Kingdom's supplier obligations from their introduction in 1994 through the Energy Efficiency Commitment and the Carbon Emissions Reduction Target, examining how the instrument changed over time and what drove those changes. With Nick Eyre he assessed the transition from these schemes to the Green Deal and the Energy Company Obligation, analysing the institutional changes involved and the implications of introducing a private-finance mechanism for household energy efficiency.

With Edith Bayer he carried out a comparative review of the costs, cost-effectiveness and wider benefits of energy efficiency obligations across several European countries, and led the first systematic evaluation of Poland's white-certificate scheme, drawing on a database of more than 4,000 delivered projects.

In 2017 he was the lead author of a report for the International Energy Agency, commissioned by the G7 energy ministers, which the IEA described as the first global overview of market-based instruments for energy efficiency, including energy efficiency obligations, auctions and white-certificate programmes. A peer-reviewed companion study found that the number of such instruments had roughly quadrupled over the preceding decade, to around 50 obligation and auction schemes worldwide, with the investment they mobilised reaching some US$26 billion in 2015.

In work with Florian Kern and Karoline Rogge, he argued that stimulating energy transitions requires policy instrument mixes that are both comprehensive and well-targeted, supporting simple, cost-effective efficiency measures alongside more complex and costly technologies.

=== Electrification ===
Rosenow uses the term "electrofficiency" to describe the inherent efficiency gains of electric technologies over the fossil-fuelled equipment they replace. He has estimated that a global switch to electrification would roughly halve global energy demand.

In 2022, Rosenow co-authored Heating up the global heat pump market in Nature Energy with Duncan Gibb, Thomas Nowak and Richard Lowes, arguing that heat pumps would play a central role in decarbonising buildings worldwide and that stronger policy support would be needed to accelerate deployment at the scale required to meet climate targets.

He has examined how taxes and levies on electricity and fossil fuels influence technology adoption and affect the competitiveness of electric heating technologies. He has also examined the role of industrial electrification in reducing dependence on imported fossil fuels while supporting climate objectives.

=== Hydrogen for heating ===
In a 2022 evidence review published in Joule, Rosenow assessed 32 independent studies, defined as those not carried out by or on behalf of a specific industry, on hydrogen heating and found that none supported its widespread use for residential and commercial heating. A subsequent meta-review of 54 independent studies, published in Cell Reports Sustainability in 2024, reached a similar conclusion: no studies supported heating with hydrogen at scale, and the evidence suggested it would be less efficient and more costly than alternatives such as heat pumps and district heating.

== Advisory roles ==
Rosenow has advised international organisations on energy and climate policy, including the World Economic Forum, the United Nations, the World Bank and the International Energy Agency. Through his work at RAP, he also advised the European Bank for Reconstruction and Development, the United States Agency for International Development, the Deutsche Gesellschaft für Internationale Zusammenarbeit, and the European Commission.

Rosenow has served as a Special Advisor to the UK House of Commons Business, Energy, and Industrial Strategy Committee, submitting written evidence on heat decarbonisation policy in July 2020, giving oral evidence to the Public Accounts Committee on household energy efficiency measures in May 2016, and advising the European Parliament and the European Commission on climate neutrality policy. In May 2025, giving evidence to the Scottish Parliament's Net Zero, Energy and Transport Committee on hydrogen policy, Rosenow argued that Scotland's wind resources gave it a strategic advantage for green hydrogen production.

In October 2025, at the invitation of the Danish EU Presidency, Rosenow addressed the Energy Council in Luxembourg, briefing the 27 EU energy ministers on Europe's industrial electrification strategy. Rosenow concluded that "by putting the right policy framework in place, we will not just decarbonise our industry; we will build a 21st‑century industrial powerhouse that is modern, competitive, and secure."

In January 2026, Rosenow participated in the World Economic Forum Annual Meeting in Davos, Switzerland, facilitating discussions on the future of global electricity systems and moderating sessions on clean energy competitiveness and the ASEAN Power Grid.

== Recognition ==
In November 2025, Rosenow was included in Stanford University's database of the world's top 2% most cited scientists. He is a Fellow of the Royal Society of Arts and a Fellow of the Energy Institute.

== Selected publications ==
Rosenow has published over 150 peer-reviewed articles, book chapters, conference papers, and technical reports.

- Rosenow, Jan; Barnes, Jacob; Galvin, Ray; O'Mara, Samuel; Lowes, Richard (2025). "Total cost of ownership of heat pumps and policy choice: The case of Great Britain". iScience. 28 (2) 111784. Elsevier BV. Bibcode:2025iSci...28k1784R. doi:10.1016/j.isci.2025.111784. ISSN 2589-0042. PMC 11803245. PMID 39925429.
- Rosenow, Jan; Stobbe, Marc; Braungardt, Sibylle (2025). "Gas grid regulation in the context of net zero transitions: A review of seven European countries". Energy Research & Social Science. 122 103987. Elsevier BV. Bibcode:2025ERSS..12203987R. doi:10.1016/j.erss.2025.103987. ISSN 2214-6296.
- Rosenow, Jan; Lowes, Richard; Kemfert, Claudia (2024). "The elephant in the room: How do we regulate gas transportation infrastructure as gas demand declines?". One Earth. 7 (7). Elsevier BV: 1158–1161. doi:10.1016/j.oneear.2024.05.022. ISSN 2590-3322.
- Rosenow, Jan (2024). "A meta-review of 54 studies on hydrogen heating". Cell Reports Sustainability. 1 (1) 100010. Elsevier BV. doi:10.1016/j.crsus.2023.100010. ISSN 2949-7906.
- Rosenow, Jan; Thomas, Sam; Gibb, Duncan; Baetens, Ruben; De Brouwer, Andries; Cornillie, Jan (2023-02-02). "Clean heating: Reforming taxes and levies on heating fuels in Europe". Energy Policy. 173 (C) 113367. Elsevier. Bibcode:2023EnPol.17313367R. doi:10.1016/j.enpol.2022.113367.
- Rosenow, Jan; Gibb, Duncan; Nowak, Thomas; Lowes, Richard (2022-09-07). "Heating up the global heat pump market". Nature Energy. 7 (10). Springer Science and Business Media LLC: 901–904. Bibcode:2022NatEn...7..901R. doi:10.1038/s41560-022-01104-8. ISSN 2058-7546.
- Rosenow, Jan; Eyre, Nick (2022). "Reinventing energy efficiency for net zero". Energy Research & Social Science. 90 102602. Elsevier BV. Bibcode:2022ERSS...9002602R. doi:10.1016/j.erss.2022.102602. ISSN 2214-6296.

== Media ==
Rosenow's work has been featured in ARD, the BBC, Capital, Der Spiegel, El País, The Economist, the Financial Times, Forbes, The Guardian, The New York Times, Time and WIRED. In a 2025 Financial Times report on the global energy transition, he argued that reversing dependence on fossil fuels "requires a whole set of reforms far beyond just supporting clean energy rollout".

Having published extensively on heat pump deployment and the decarbonisation of heating systems, Rosenow was quoted in a 2025 New York Times article on heat pump performance in cold climates, stating that "even when it's really cold, heat pumps have at least double the efficiency of the fossil fuel heating system". In 2026, amid the Iran war, he was quoted in The Guardian warning of a "carbon lock-in effect" from rushed fossil fuel expansion, appeared on France 24's The Debate programme discussing alternatives to Gulf oil, and was quoted in the German business magazine Capital warning that price subsidies risk worsening energy shortages by suppressing the price signal needed to reduce demand.
