= Walter Kern =

Walter Kern may refer to:

- Walter M. D. Kern (1937–1998), American politician, member of the New Jersey General Assembly
- Walter Kern (German politician) (1954–2025), member of the Landtag of North Rhine-Westphalia

== See also ==
- Walter Kirn (born 1962), American novelist, literary critic, and essayist
