= Richard Washington (disambiguation) =

Richard Washington (born 1955) is an American basketball player.

Richard Washington may also refer to:

- Richard Washington (provost) (1592–1666), English academic
- Richard Washington (American football) (born 1985), American football player
- Richard Washington (climatologist), South African climate scientist
