= Environmental Change Institute =

Part of Oxford University

Environmental Change Institute, University of Oxford
- Formation: 1991
- Purpose: to organise and promote interdisciplinary research on the nature, causes and impact of environmental change and to contribute to the development of management strategies for coping with future environmental change
- Headquarters: Oxford University Centre for the Environment, South Parks Road, Oxford, OX1 3QY, United Kingdom
- Location: Oxford
- Members: 60 researchers, 60 graduate students, 350 partners
- Director: Professor Michael Obersteiner
- Website: www.eci.ox.ac.uk
- Formerly called: Environmental Change Unit

The Environmental Change Institute (ECI) at the University of Oxford in England was founded in 1991 "to organize and promote interdisciplinary research on the nature, causes and impact of environmental change and to contribute to the development of management strategies for coping with future environmental change". The ECI is part of the School of Geography and the Environment, University of Oxford, ranked as the world’s top department in Geography.

In 2013/14 it had a research income of £4.7million, 50 active projects, 350 partners and 60 researchers working across 40 countries.

The ECI's research is interdisciplinary in both outlook and approach. The institute has an international track record for research in climate, ecosystems and energy and a growing expertise in the fields of food, water and health.

ECI is involved in several long-term research projects, including the UK Climate Impacts Programme (UKCIP) which develops new tools to link climate science with business and government for innovations that can adaptat to the impacts of climate change and Climateprediction.net, the world's largest citizen science climate project with 350,000 individuals running climate simulations in order to better understand regional climate patterns. Staff of the institute have led EU consortium programmes including Impressions, studying the impacts and risks of extreme climate change; and co-ordinated GEM, a global ecological monitoring programme across remote forest locations in South America, Africa and Asia.

The ECI also runs an MSc in Environmental Change and Management (ECM). The MSc is heavily oversubscribed attracting 400 applications for 25 places in 2024/25.

== History ==
The Institute was established in 1991, following a £1M fundraising effort by the Campaign for Oxford . It was originally called the Environmental Change Unit, and the first director was Martin Parry, who was in post from 1991 to 1994. The next director was Richard Macrory, from 1994 to 1995, followed by Jim Briden, from 1996 to 2003. In 1999, the unit was renamed the Environmental Change Institute.

The Institute was led by Professor Jim Hall from 2011 until September 2018. He was replaced by Professor Michael Obersteiner following Dr Friederike Otto's acting directorship.

== Research ==
The ECI's research is organised around five main themes in climate, ecosystems, energy, food and water.

There are expert teams in:

- Biodiversity and climate adaptation
- Climate impacts and adaptation
- Ecosystem dynamics and ecosystem services
- Energy demand management
- Extreme climate event attribution
- Food security
- Sustainable infrastructure systems
- Tropical forests and carbon dynamics
- Water security

The ECI is also home to two internationally recognised research collaborations:

The Leverhulme Centre for Nature Recovery (LCNR) serves as a hub for innovative thinking, dialogue and analysis on restoring nature in the UK and globally. It brings together experts from across the University of Oxford and beyond to tackle urgent questions around biodiversity and ecosystem recovery.

TABLE is a global platform focused on food systems, helping to clarify the evidence, values, and assumptions that shape debates around sustainable and resilient food futures.

== Notable people ==
Several notable people work at the ECI including:

- Professor Michael Obersteiner
- Professor Yadvinder Malhi
- Professor Jim Hall
- Professor Myles Allen
- Professor Jan Rosenow
- Dr Brenda Boardman (emeritus)

Former notable ECI staff include

- Dr Friederike Otto
- Professor Diana Liverman
