= James C. Briden =

British geophysicist

- Born: 30 December 1938 (age 87); Hendon, Middlesex
- Education: University of Oxford (BA), Australian National University (PhD, 1964)
- Awards: Murchison Medal (1984)
- Scientific career
- Fields: Paleomagnetism, geology
- Workplaces: University of Rhodesia; University of Leeds; University of Oxford
- Thesis: Palaeolatitudes and palaeomagnetic studies, with special reference to pre-Carboniferous rocks in Australia (1964)
- Doctoral advisor: Ted Irving

James Christopher Briden is a British geophysicist, known for his work on paleoclimate and paleomagnetism. He was awarded the Murchison Medal of the Geological Society of London in 1984.

== Education ==
Briden attended the Royal Grammar School, High Wycombe from 1949 to 1957 and won a State Scholarship in Mathematics to St Catherine's College, Oxford. At school he read Arthur Holmes' principles of physical geology, and became interested in the intersection of geology and physics. Briden was an undergraduate in Oxford. Following a lecture by Patrick Blackett on paleomagnetism and continental drift, Briden was inspired to undertake a PhD in paleomagnetism at the Australian National University to work with Ted Irving. This worked involved the documentation of 'polar wander paths' for the continents of Gondwaland, through the analysis of their ancient magnetic signatures. He completed his PhD thesis on paleolatitudes and paleomagnetic studies in 1964.

== Career ==
From Australia, Briden moved to Southern Rhodesia, now Zimbabwe, where he became interested in the geological structure and history of Africa. From there, Briden went to the University of Leeds, which had a strong African geology research group led by Robert Shackleton. Briden continued his paleomagnetic work, extending deeper in time to the Proterozoic, and leading to the idea that there had been another ancient supercontinent at that time. He wrote papers on the intensity of paleomag field through time, and on plate movement and continental magmatism in Africa. He also began to use paleomagnetic techniques in younger rocks to look at the cooling, uplift and erosion histories of the Caledonian mountains.

Briden was appointed professor of geophysics in Leeds in 1975, and was awarded the Murchison Medal in 1984 in recognition of his work on paleomagnetism.

== Later career ==
In 1986, Briden was appointed to the new position of director of Earth Sciences for the UK research funding agency, NERC. In this role, he was a member of the board of the British Geological Survey from 1989 to 1994. In 1996, he was appointed director of the Environmental Change Institute, Oxford, and contributed to contemporary discussions around climate change. Briden was professor of environmental studies in Oxford and fellow of Linacre College from 1997 until his retirement in 2003.
