= Edward A. Irving =

Canadian geologist (1927 – 2014)

Ted Irving
- Born: 27 May 1927; Colne, Lancashire, England
- Died: 25 February 2014 (aged 86); Saanich, British Columbia, Canada
- Education: University of Cambridge (BA, MSc, DSc)
- Spouse: Sheila (née Irwin)
- Children: Kate, Susan, Martin, George
- Awards: CM; FRSC; FRS (1979); Wollaston Medal (2005)
- Scientific career
- Fields: Paleomagnetism
- Workplaces: Geological Survey of Canada, Pacific Geosciences Center
- Doctoral students: Jim Briden

Edward A. "Ted" Irving, CM FRSC FRS (27 May 1927 – 25 February 2014) was a British-Canadian geologist. He was a scientist with the Geological Survey of Canada. His studies of paleomagnetism provided the first physical evidence of the theory of continental drift. His efforts contributed to our understanding of how mountain ranges, climate, and life have changed over the past millions of years.

== Education ==
Irving was born on 25 May 1925 and raised in Colne in the Pennine Hills of east Lancashire, England. In 1945, he was conscripted into the British Army. Irving served in the Middle East infantry. In 1948, he began studying geology at the University of Cambridge and obtained his Bachelor of Arts degree in 1951. He spent the next year at Cambridge as a research assistant with Keith Runcorn in the geology and geophysics department before entering the graduate program.

When Irving started his graduate studies, the history of the Earth's magnetic field was known for the few centuries since the first magnetic observatories had been established. With fellow students Kenneth Creer and Jan Hospers, he looked to extend this record back in time. Irving used a magnetometer, recently designed by Patrick Blackett, to analyze the magnetic directions imparted to rocks by their iron minerals. He found large discrepancies between the directions of the present magnetic field direction and those recorded in Precambrian rock in the highlands of Scotland. He surmised the only explanation could be that Scotland had shifted relative to the geomagnetic pole. Irving also determined that India had moved northward by 6000 km and rotated by more than 30°. These results confirmed the predictions Alfred Wegener had put forth in his theory of continental drift in 1912.

In 1954, Irving attempted to obtain a PhD for his graduate work. Unfortunately the field was so new that his doctoral examiners were not familiar enough with the subject matter to recognize his research achievements. They refused to give him the degree. Not having a PhD did not stop him from obtaining a position as a research fellow at the Australian National University in Canberra.

== Career ==
For the next ten years Irving studied Australia's ancient latitudes and published around 30 papers. He was able to demonstrate the continent's southward movement since the Permian period. In 1965, he submitted some of his papers to Cambridge and obtained a ScD, the highest earned degree at the time.

Irving met his wife Sheila while in Australia. She was a Canadian citizen. In 1964, they moved to Ottawa, Ontario, Canada, and Irving began work as a research officer for Dominion Observatory with the Department of Mines and Technical Surveys. In 1966, Irving returned to England to teach geophysics at the University of Leeds. He returned to Ottawa in 1967 to work as a research scientist in the Earth Physics Branch of the Department of Energy, Mines, and Resources. In 1981, Irving moved to Sidney, British Columbia, to establish a paleomagnetism laboratory at the Pacific Geoscience Centre with the Earth Physics Branch. The branch would later be incorporated into the Geological Survey of Canada. He mapped the movements of Vancouver Island and other parts of the Cordillera that have moved sideways and rotated relative to the Precambrian Canadian Shield.

In 2005, Irving was semi-retired, investigating the nature of the geomagnetic field in the Precambrian to understand how the crust was being deformed and how the latitudes varied. He and his wife Sheila had four children. He died during the night of 24 February 2014 in Saanich, British Columbia.

== Selected works ==
Irving published a total of 205 papers, including:

- — (January 1956). "Palaeomagnetic and palaeoclimatological aspects of polar wandering". Geofisica Pura e Applicata. 33 (1): 23–41. Bibcode:1956GeoPA..33...23I. doi:10.1007/BF02629944. S2CID 129781412.
- —; Parry, L. G. (May 1963). "The Magnetism of some Permian Rocks from New South Wales". Geophysical Journal International. 7 (4): 395–411. Bibcode:1963GeoJ....7..395I. doi:10.1111/j.1365-246X.1963.tb07084.x.
- — (24 November 1977). "Drift of the major continental blocks since the Devonian". Nature. 270 (5635): 304–309. Bibcode:1977Natur.270..304I. doi:10.1038/270304a0. S2CID 4188381.
- — (March 1979). "Paleopoles and paleolatitudes of North America and speculations about displaced terrains". Canadian Journal of Earth Sciences. 16 (3): 669–694. Bibcode:1979CaJES..16..669I. doi:10.1139/e79-065.
- —; Irving, G. A. (July 1982). "Apparent polar wander paths carboniferous through cenozoic and the assembly of Gondwana". Geophysical Surveys. 5 (2): 141–188. Bibcode:1982GeoSu...5..141I. doi:10.1007/BF01453983. S2CID 129721379.
- —; Woodsworth, G. J.; Wynne, P. J.; Morrison, A. (1985). "Paleomagnetic evidence for displacement from the south of the Coast Plutonic Complex, British Columbia". Canadian Journal of Earth Sciences. 22 (4): 584–598. Bibcode:1985CaJES..22..584I. doi:10.1139/e85-058.

In addition, he published the first book on paleomagnetism:

- — (1964). Paleomagnetism and its application to geological and geophysical problems. Wiley.

== Honors and awards ==
Irving was awarded the Gondwanaland Gold Medal by the Mining, Geological, and Metallurgical Society of India, the Logan Medal by the Geological Association of Canada (1975), the Walter H. Bucher Medal by the American Geophysical Union (1979), the J. Tuzo Wilson Medal by the Canadian Geophysical Union (1984), the Arthur L. Day Medal by the Geological Society of America (1997), and the Wollaston Medal by the Geological Society of London (2005). He was made a fellow of the Royal Society of Canada (FRSC) in 1973 and of the Royal Society of London (FRS) in 1979. In 1998 he was elected to the National Academy of Sciences and in 2003 invited to be a Member of the Order of Canada. He received an honorary degree from the University of Victoria in 1999.
