= Heinrich Schacht =

German pedagogue and ornithologist

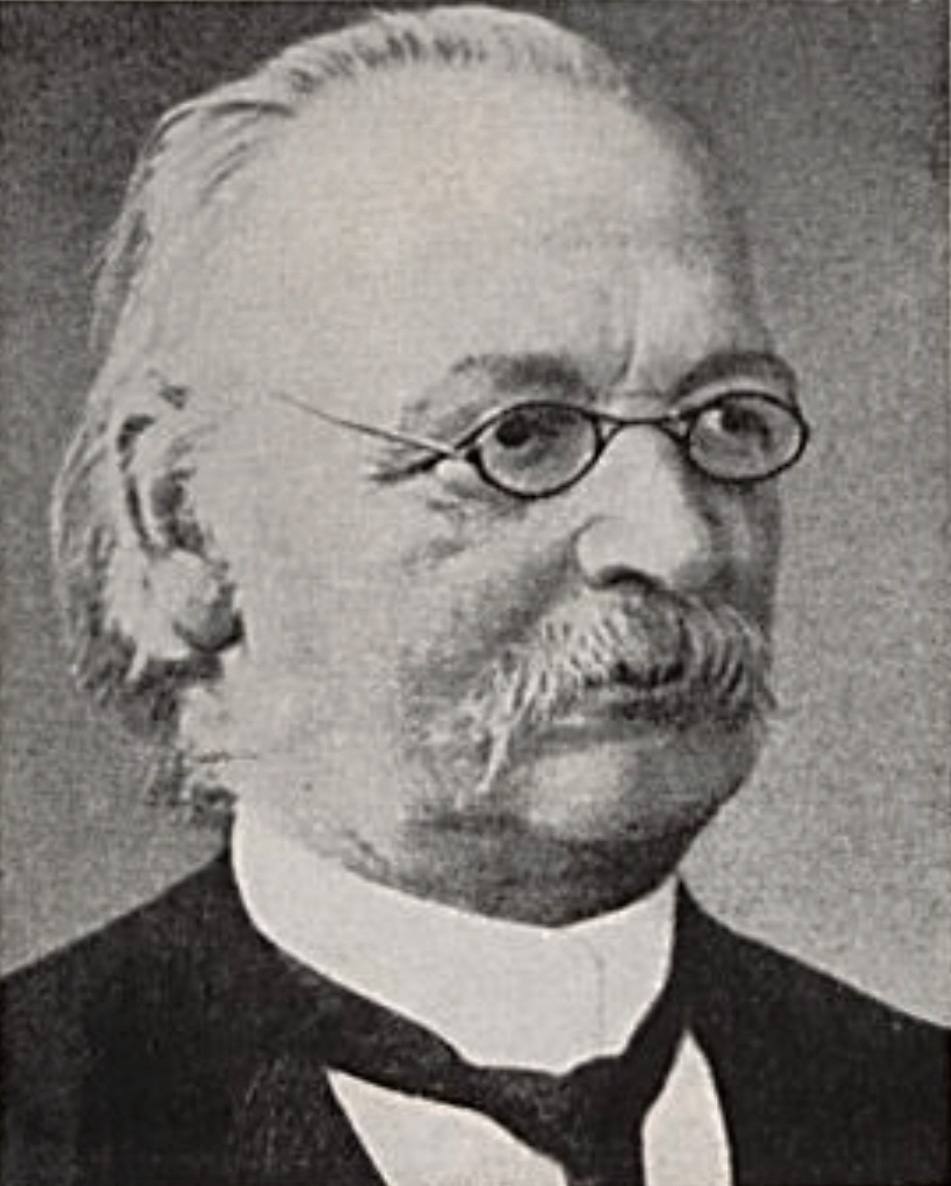
Heinrich Schacht

Heinrich Schacht (born 26 January 1840 in Lemgo, Germany, and died 8 February 1912 in Jerxen/Detmold) was a German pedagogue and ornithologist.

== Biography ==
Schacht's father worked as a master turner. Early on, Schacht became interested in the world of birds. He attended the primary schools in Lemgo and from 1855 the teacher's seminar in Detmold, in North-Rhine-Westphalia, Germany. Here he was taught by Carl Weerth (founder of the Detmold museum), graduated in 1857 and became an assistant teacher at the Kantorschule Oerlinghausen. From 1858 to 1865, he was teacher in Lieme, 1865 to 1890 teacher in Veldrom. His first scientific lectures from 1870 were on the bird life of Lippe at the Natural Science Association of Lippe.

From 1890 until 1912 he was the main teacher at the then newly founded Jerxer-School (Jerxen nearby Detmold). 1892 Schacht was responsible for 93 pupils (44 girls, 49 boys). In 1902 102 pupils attended the school. In 1909 Schacht was assisted by a secondary teacher, August Räker. The schools still exists today as a primary school and is called Oetternbachschule. Schacht was a board member of the Zoological Section and wrote articles in the journals Ornithologische Monatsschrift and Der Zoologischer Garten. He was involved in the Lippischer Lehrerverein, was a long-standing member and chairman of the Lippischer Verein für Tierschutz.

He also wrote poems, also in Lippisch Platt. From 1891 until about 1912 he was the leader of the male choral society "Arion" in Jerxen-Orbke (today: male and female choir "Arion" Jerxen-Orbke). For health reasons he had to resign from his position as conductor. He died a short time later. His colleague, Gustav Wolff, wrote an obituary for Heinrich Schacht in the Ornithologische Monatsschrift.

== Publications ==
- Die Baukünste unserer Vögel. (Der Zool. Garten 10.1969)
- Der Hirschschröter <Lucanus cervus> als Vogelmörder. (Der Zool. Garten 11.1870)
- Der Zug der Vögel. <Mit Berücksichtigung d. Vogelzuges im Jahre 1872> (Der Zool. Garten 14.1873)
- Die Vogelwelt des Teutoburgerwaldes. Detmold: Meyer, 1877 (LLB Detmold)
- Die regulären Wandervögel des Teutoburger Waldes (Der Zool. Garten 20.1879)
- Die Geburtshelferkröte (Der Zool. Garten 21.1880)
- Wachtelkönig <Crex pratensis> im Stalle. (Der Zool. Garten 25.1884)
- Die Feinde unserer Singvögel. (Der Zool. Garten 25.1884)
- Fang eines Siebenschläfers <Myoxus glis> (Der Zool. Garten 25.1884)
- Die Raubsäugertiere des Teutoburger Waldes. (Der Zool. Garten 28.1887; 31.1890; 32.1891; 33.1892)
- Das erste Storchennest in Lippe. [1855] (LippBlHeim. 2.1901)
- Ende des Mufflons <Ovis tragelaphus> im Teutoburger Walde. (Der Zool. Garten 45.1904)
