= Walter Kern (German politician) =

German politician (1954–2025)

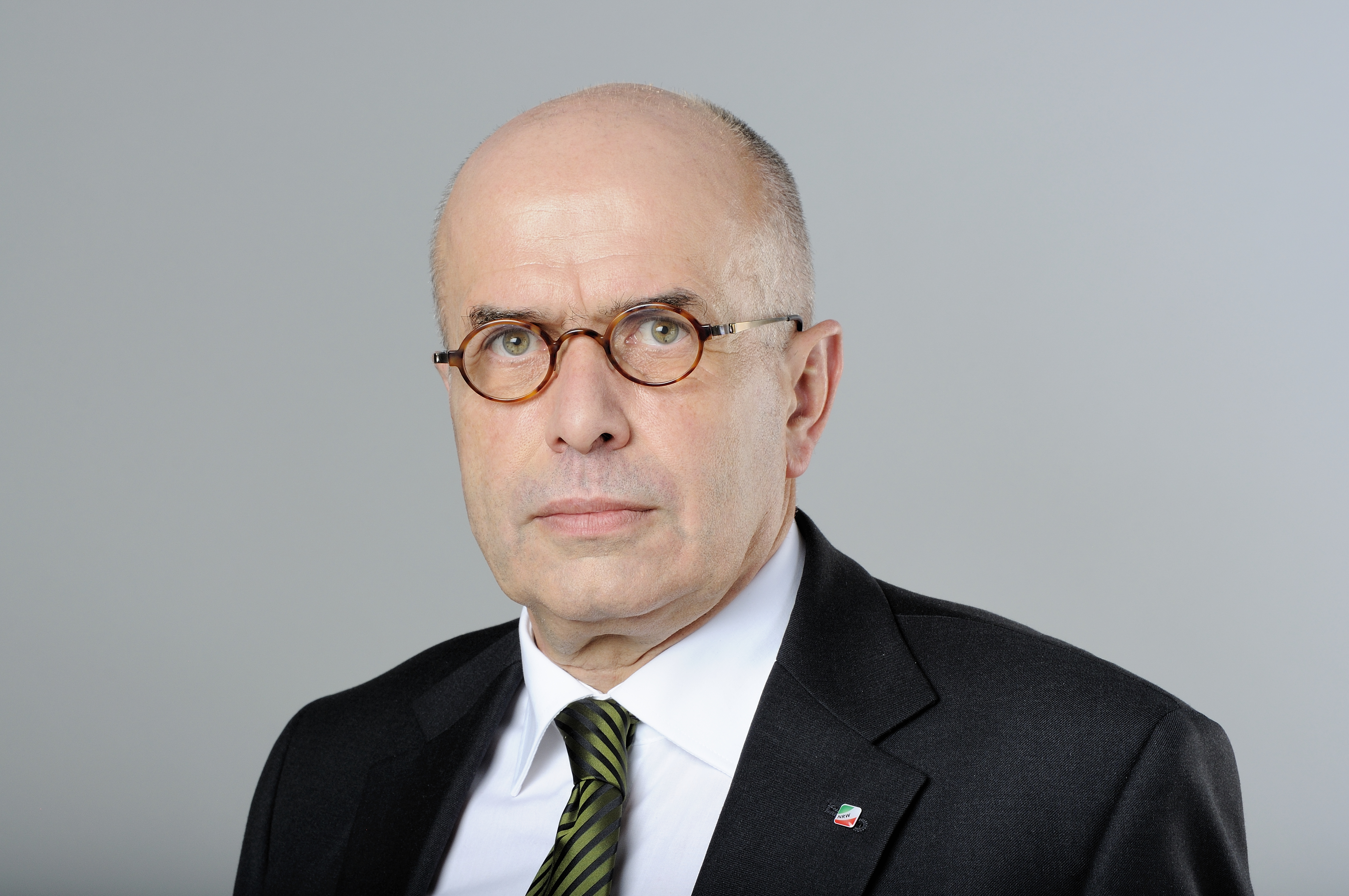
- Kern in 2013

Member of the Landtag of North Rhine-Westphalia
- In office 31 May 2012 – 31 May 2017
- In office 8 June 2005 – 8 June 2010

Personal details
- Born: 9 February 1954 Beckum, North Rhine-Westphalia, West Germany
- Died: 9 November 2025 (aged 71) Lemgo, North Rhine-Westphalia, Germany
- Political party: CDU
- Occupation: Banker

Walter Kern (9 February 1954 – 9 November 2025) was a German politician. A member of the Christian Democratic Union, he served in the Landtag of North Rhine-Westphalia from 2005 to 2010 and again from 2012 to 2017.

Kern died in Lemgo on 9 November 2025, at the age of 71.
