= Richard Washington (climatologist) =

South African climate scientist and meteorologist

Richard Washington is a South African climate scientist and meteorologist. He is Professor of Climate Science at the School of Geography and the Environment at the University of Oxford, as well as being the Director of the Radcliffe Meteorological Station, which has the longest single-site weather records in the United Kingdom. He is a fellow of Keble College, Oxford.

== Background ==
Washington has been involved in a number of major projects in the field of climatology, specialising in African climate science. He gained degrees from the University of Natal and the University of Oxford and has taught at the University of Natal, University of Cape Town, Stellenbosch University and the University of Oxford. He served as external examiner on the University of East Anglia climate change MSc programme for several years and has also been the external examiner on a number of undergraduate degree courses in the British Isles. He has examined more than 25 PhD theses.

== Representation on Science Committees ==
He was a panel member of the World Climate Research Programme African Climate Variability Panel (CLIVAR-VACS) from 2003–2006, before becoming co-chair from 2006–2010 . He is an author of several IPCC reports, including both Working Groups I and II. He also served as a representative for the World Climate Research Program to the International Council for Science in southern Africa, and as a member of multiple external steering committees including the Commonwealth Scholarship Commission, The Scientific Steering Group of CLIVAR (World Climate Research Programme), The Met Office Climate Science Research Partnership, African Earth System Science (AFRICANNESS) and the Stockholm Environment Institute.

== Career ==
Washington took up the position of lecturer at Christ Church, Oxford in 1993, departmental lecturer in the School of Geography and the Environment at the University of Oxford in 1995, University Lecturer and Fellow of Keble College in 1999, Readership in 2006, and a Professorship in 2010. In the same year as obtaining professorship he also received the teaching excellence award from The University of Oxford. Washington has supervised more than 20 PhD students to successful completion, almost all of whom have focused on African climate science. He has published more than 150 peer-reviewed articles in scientific journals and has a Google Scholar h-index of 63 in 2026.

== Role in Observational Field Programmes in Africa ==
A key feature of his research has entailed field observation programmes in Africa which have aimed at improving weather forecast and climate models. In 2005, the Royal Geographical Society funded Bodele Dust Experiment (BoDEX) in Chad recovered the first observational data from the world’s largest single dust source. These data led to the discovery of the Bodele Low Level Jet. He was Principal Investigator of the NERC funded consortium grant Fennec programme which focused on the central Sahara (Algeria, Mali and Mauritania). The Fennec programme included 200 hours of flying time in the UK’s Bae-146 research aircraft and ground observations on the Mali-Algerian border at Bordj Badji Mokhtar from flux tower, Lidar, sodar and radiosondes. A matching site was established as part of the programme near Zouérat in Mauritania. The programme yielded the most comprehensive data set to date from the core of the central Sahara in summer. Washington was Principal Investigator of the NERC funded Dust Observations for Models (DO4Models) project which secured mineral aerosol observations from the Makgadikgadi Pan in Botswana and Etosha pan in Namibia and the dry river valleys of the Skeleton Coast. The project ran from 2010 to 2016. He continued field observations at Etosha and the dry river valleys in Namibia as part of the NERC funded CLARIFY campaign which also featured the operation of the Bae-146 research aircraft in the subtropical South Atlantic Ocean. In 2018, Washington secured NERC funding for a new Lidar system which was set up in Yaounde, Cameroon in collaboration with Wilfried Pokam. The Lidar system was run for a year in conjunction with one minute automatic weather station data. His most recent field campaign is the NERC funded DRYCAB project of which he is also Principal Investigator. This project involves the release of around 800 radiosondes and the deployment of Lidar both on the DRC/Angola/Zambian border near Ikelenge and at Solwezi airport. DRYCAB is aimed at understanding rainfall onset in the austral summer. The project is run with the collaboration of the Zambian Meteorological Department.

== Other Climate Science Research ==
Aside from projects aimed at obtaining observational data in the field, Washington has led the climate science component of the 5 year NERC and DFID funded UMFULA project and the climate model evaluation component of the 4 year NERC and DFID funded IMPALA project. He was Principal Investigator of the DFID funded LaunchPAD project which involved climate scientists in East, southern, central and West Africa in climate model evaluation.

== External Roles ==
In 2020, Washington was appointed as a scientific advisor and lead desert scientist for the Extreme E motorsport series. In his role, he has been praised by a wide range of journalists for his ability to satisfactorily address a number of issues related to Extreme E. He has especially cited the series' potential to divert the attention of large worldwide audiences towards climate-related issues as a key reason for his involvement. In 2022, Washington was appointed as Chair of the Extreme E Science Committee. He has been on the Panel of Expert Advisors of the Earthshot Prize since 2023.
