= Simon Peter Tilemann =

German artist (1601–1668)

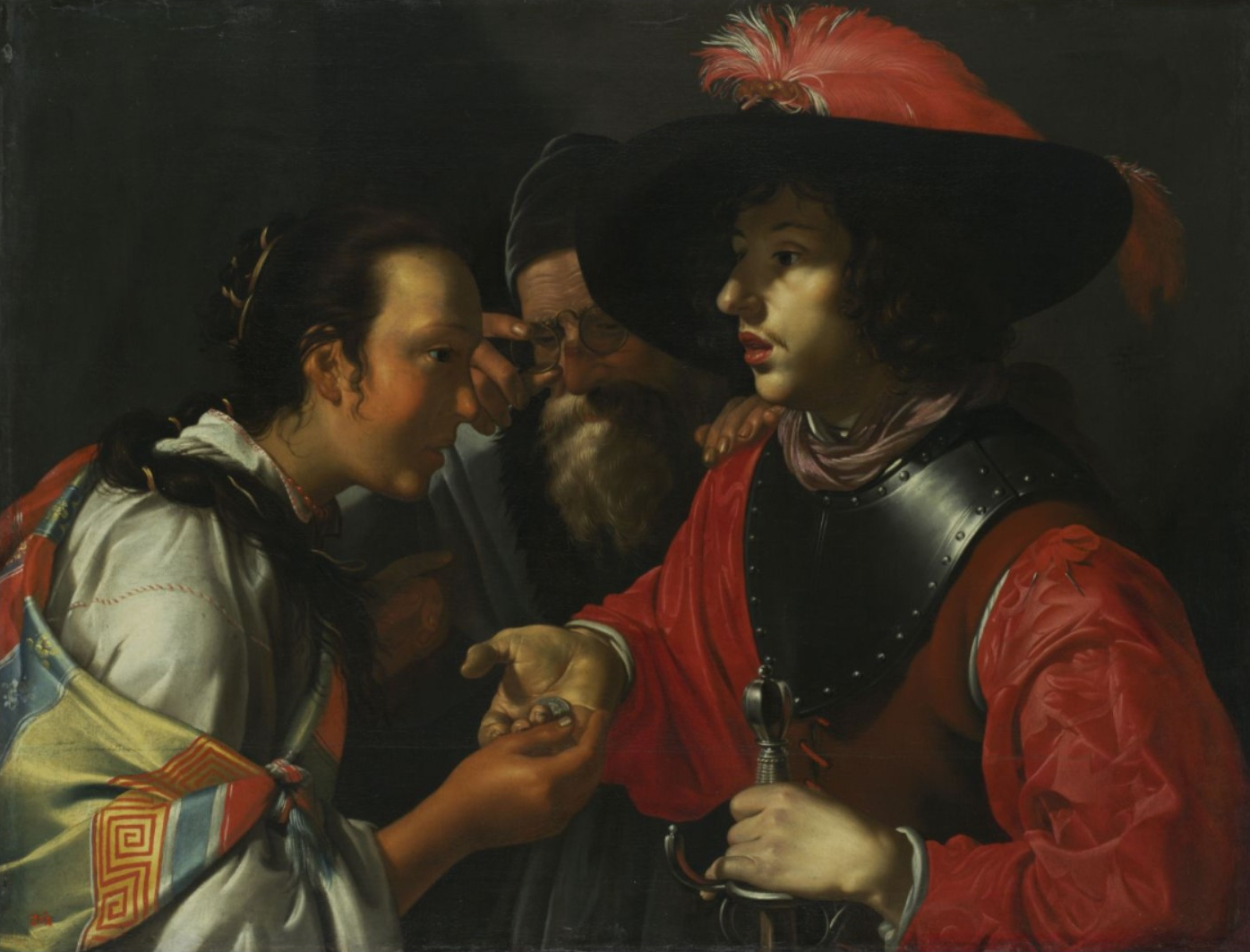
The Fortune Teller

Simon Peter Tilemann or Simon Peter Tilman, called Schenk (1601, Lemgo – 1668, Vienna), was a German Baroque painter who was active in Bremen, Utrecht, Kassel, and Italy. He was mainly known for his portraits and genre scenes, and to a lesser extent his history and still life paintings. His work was influenced by the Caravaggist movement during his stay in Italy in subject matter as well as style.

== Life ==
Tilimann was the son f Johann Tilemann, bailiff and painter to Count Simon VI at Lippe (now in the east of North Rhine-Westphalia, Germany) and Margareta Borggrefings, a citizen of Bremen. His father travelled regularly to the Netherlands as art agent. After the death of his wife in 1614, his father, who had acquired Bremen citizenship in 1596, moved to Bremen with his five children. Tileman grew up and was trained as a painter by his father in Bremen. He first learned to paint flowers.

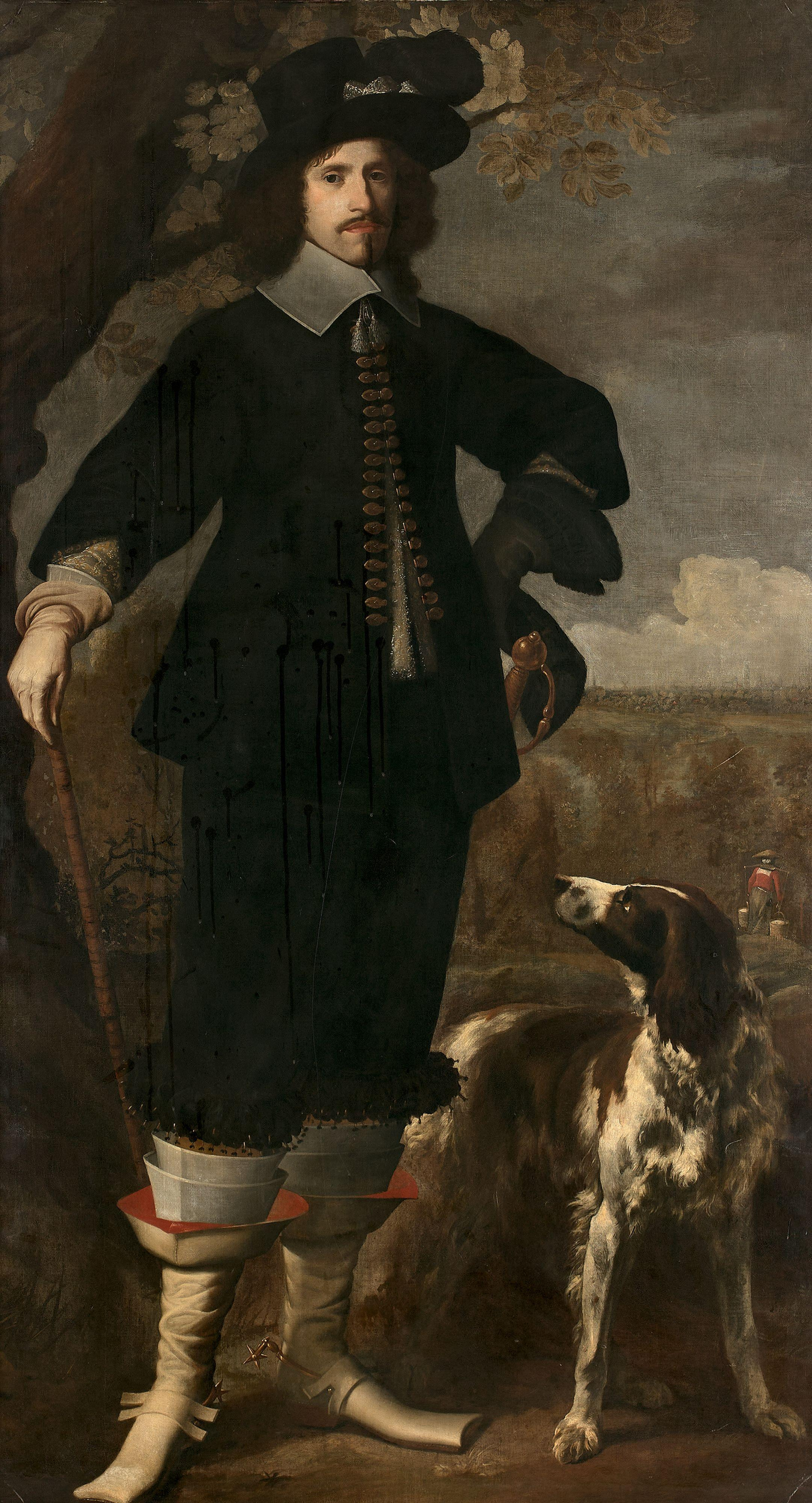
Portrait of Lodewijk Filips, 9th count of Egmont

During the years 1625 to 1632, he travelled through the Northern Netherlands, the Rhineland, Bohemia and Italy. In Vienna he is said to have painted a portrait of Emperor Ferdinand III.

He married Clara Glandorp in Bremen before 23 August 1632. After her death in 1645, he married Barbara de Herlin on 23 February 1647. Their daughter Clara Tilman (1648-1698) became a painter of flowers in watercolors. He was a good landscape painter who spent many years in Italy, but later switched to portrait painting and who painted the portrait of while in Vienna.

== Work ==
He was mainly known for his portraits and genre scenes, and to a lesser extent his history and still life paintings.
