= Fennec (DJ) =

American house music producer

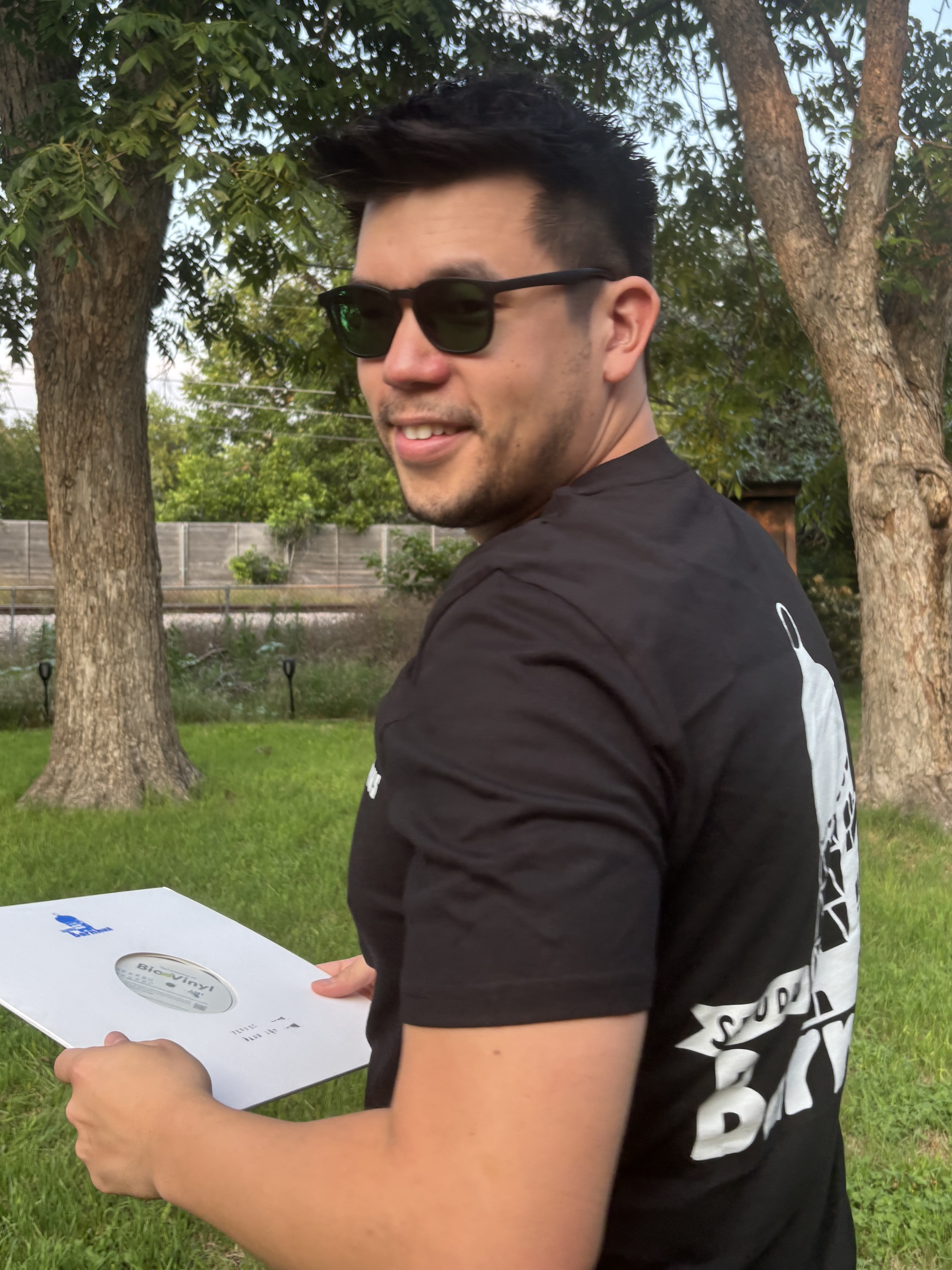
- Fennec in Austin, Texas.

Background information
- Born: 1990 or 1991 (age 35–36); Indianapolis, Indiana, US
- Genres: Electronic; house; pop
- Years active: 2014–present
- Label: Studio Barnhus (2025)
- Website: fennecsound.bandcamp.com

Fennec is an American electronic music producer and DJ known for his sample-driven house music that incorporates elements of funk, disco, and hip-hop. Originally from Indiana, Fennec is based in Austin, Texas.

== Early life and education ==
Fennec was born in 1990 or 1991 in Indianapolis, Indiana. He did his undergrad, including a minor in music history, at the Indiana University Bloomington.

Fennec previously worked as an employment lawyer in Indianapolis, before moving to grad school at the University of Texas at Austin in 2021 to study public policy.

Fennec, who has kept his birth-name private, chose the African desert fox for his musician moniker.

== Career ==
Fennec began releasing music in 2014, self-publishing early tracks and albums online. Over time, his sound has incorporated more rhythmic, club-oriented structures, often sampling from a wide range of sources.

In 2022, Fennec released A Couple of Good Days, an album characterized by upbeat tempos, layered percussion, and bright melodic samples. Pitchfork highlighted the album's inventive use of samples and summery tone, while Resident Advisor praised its intricate layering and emotional depth.

Fennec signed with the Swedish label Studio Barnhus in 2025 for the release of his EP Momentary Pleasure.

== Recognition ==
Rolling Stone placed Fennec's 2020 track "Boy-U" at number 105 on their 2022 list of the "200 Greatest Dance Songs of All Time".

== Discography ==
- Let Your Heart Break (2014)
- Beloved (2014)
- R.I.P. City (2015)
- Grief Stage Player (2016)
- This Place Was Once a Palace (2016)
- One Night Could Change Your Life (2017)
- Outlast EP (2017)
- So That I May See You Again (2018)
- Only In My Dreams (Original Soundtrack) (2019)
- free us of this feeling (2020)
- Finding Rest in a Weary World (2020)
- a couple of good days (2022)
- Nice Work Vol. 1 (2023)
- Nice Work Vol. 2 (2024)
- Nice Work Vol. 3 (2024)
- Momentary Pleasure (2025)
- Willy Nilly (2026)
- Afterhours EP (2026)
