= Lemgo =

- Town
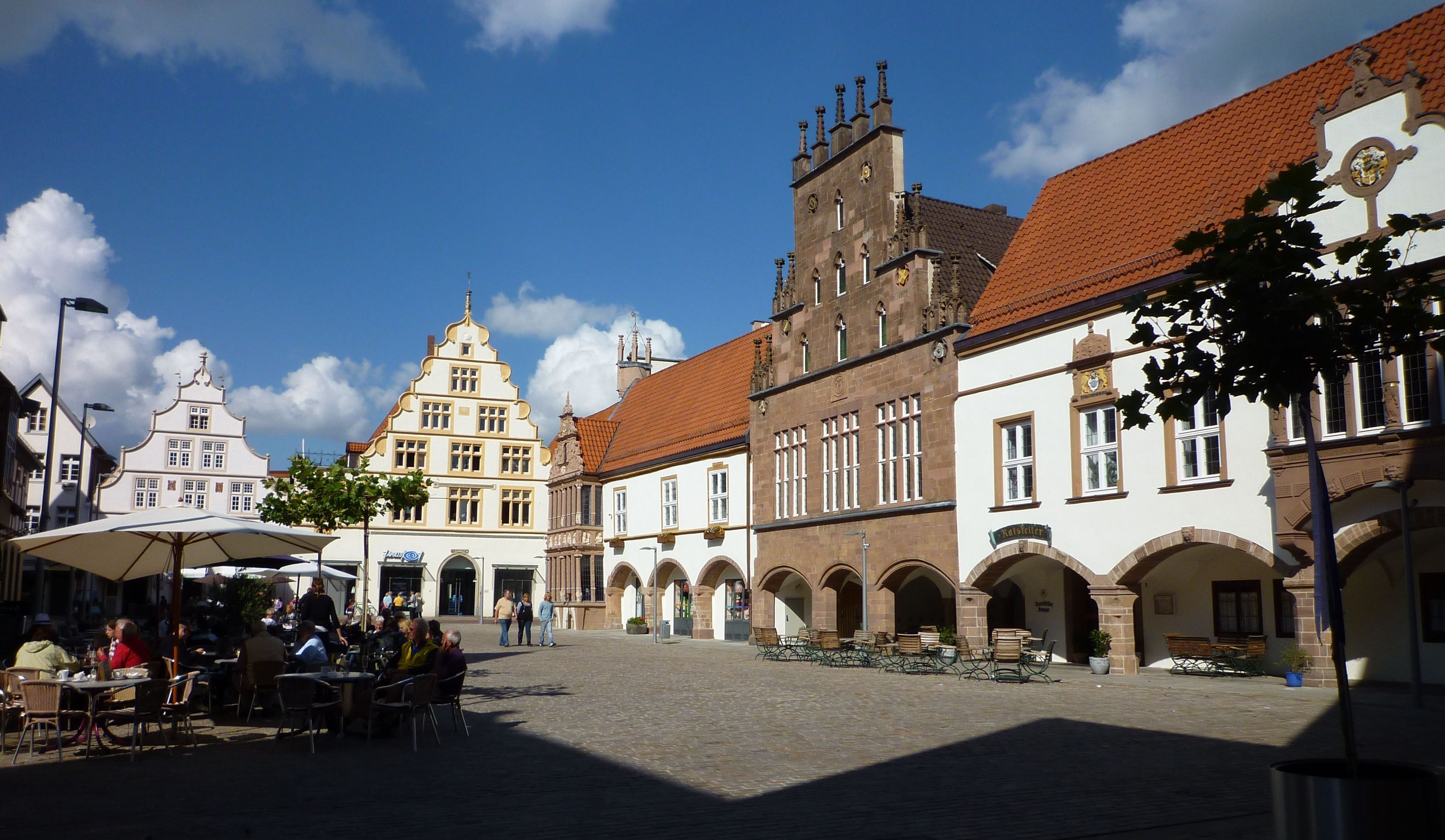
- Market Square of Lemgo

- Coat of arms

- Location of Lemgo within Lippe district
- Interactive map of Lemgo
- Location within Germany Location within North Rhine-Westphalia
- Coordinates: 52°1′38″N 8°54′42″E
- Country: Germany
- State: North Rhine-Westphalia
- Admin. region: Detmold
- District: Lippe

Government
  - Mayor (2020–25): Markus Baier (Ind.)

Area
  - Total: 100.85 km^{2} (38.94 sq mi)
- Elevation: 100 m (330 ft)

Population (2025-12-31)
  - Total: 39,959
  - Density: 396.22/km^{2} (1,026.2/sq mi)
- Time zone: UTC+01:00 (CET)
  - Summer (DST): UTC+02:00 (CEST)
- Postal codes: 32657
- Dialling codes: 05261, 05266 (Brüntorf, partially Matorf-Kirchheide)
- Vehicle registration: LIP
- Website: www.lemgo.de

Lemgo (German pronunciation: [ˈlɛmɡoː]; Low German: Lemge, Lemje) is a university and old Hanseatic town in the Lippe district of North Rhine-Westphalia, Germany.

It is situated between the Teutoburg Forest and the Weser Uplands, 25 km east of Bielefeld and 70 km west of Hannover.

Lemgo is the oldest town in the former principality of Lippe and has a population of c. 45,000 and belongs to the OWL region, which is one of the most important cluster regions for mechanical engineering and industrial electronics in Germany.

== History ==
It was founded 1190 by Bernard II, Lord of Lippe at the crossroad of two merchant routes. Therefore it is the oldest town in the Lippe district.

Lemgo was a member of the Hanseatic League, a medieval trading association of free or autonomous cities in several northern European countries such as the Netherlands, Germany and Poland. During the Reformation the city of Lemgo adopted Lutheranism in 1522, whereas otherwise in Lippe, its spread was hampered until 1533 by the opposition of the then Catholic ruling Counts of Lippe.

In 1605 Simon VI, Count of Lippe adopted Calvinism and demanded the conversion of Lemgo's citizens too using his monarchic privilege of cuius regio, eius religio. This led to a dispute with Lemgo. The city defied the edict to convert to Calvinism, leading to the Revolt of Lemgo. This religious dispute was resolved by the Peace of Röhrentrup in 1617, granting Lemgo the right to determine its faith independently. During the 30 Years War, on 15 October 1638, it was put under siege by a combined army of Palatine and Swedish troops, but it was soon lifted upon the approach of a hostile army. Two days later, the Battle of Vlotho occurred, about 11 miles from Lemgo. Lippe's Lutheran minority, mostly domiciled in Lemgo, only joined the else Reformed Church of Lippe in 1882, however, retaining its Confession of Augsburg with the Lutheran congregations forming a separate classis within the Lippe church since 1888.

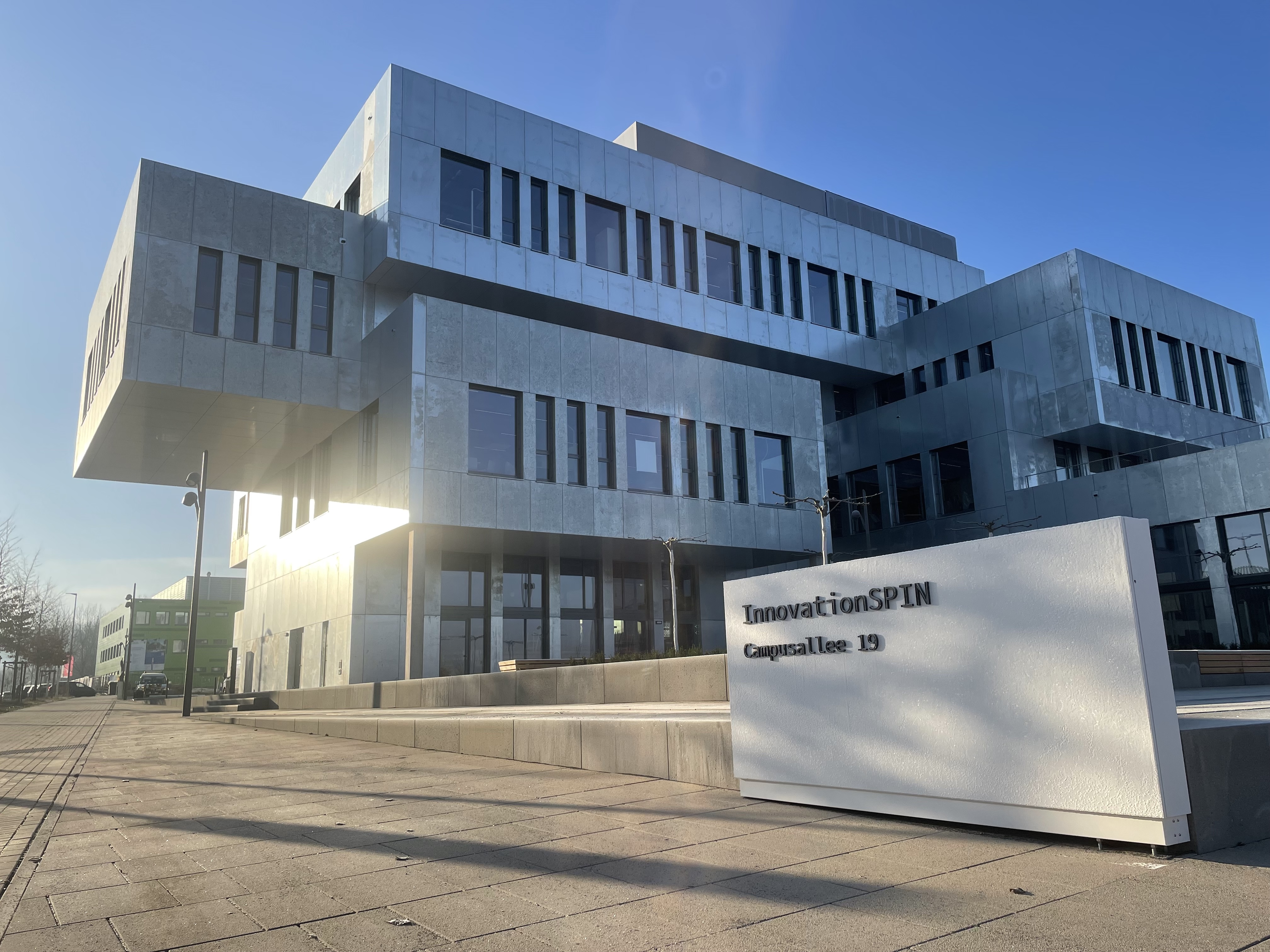
The new central place of the Innovation Campus Lemgo (Dec. 2022)

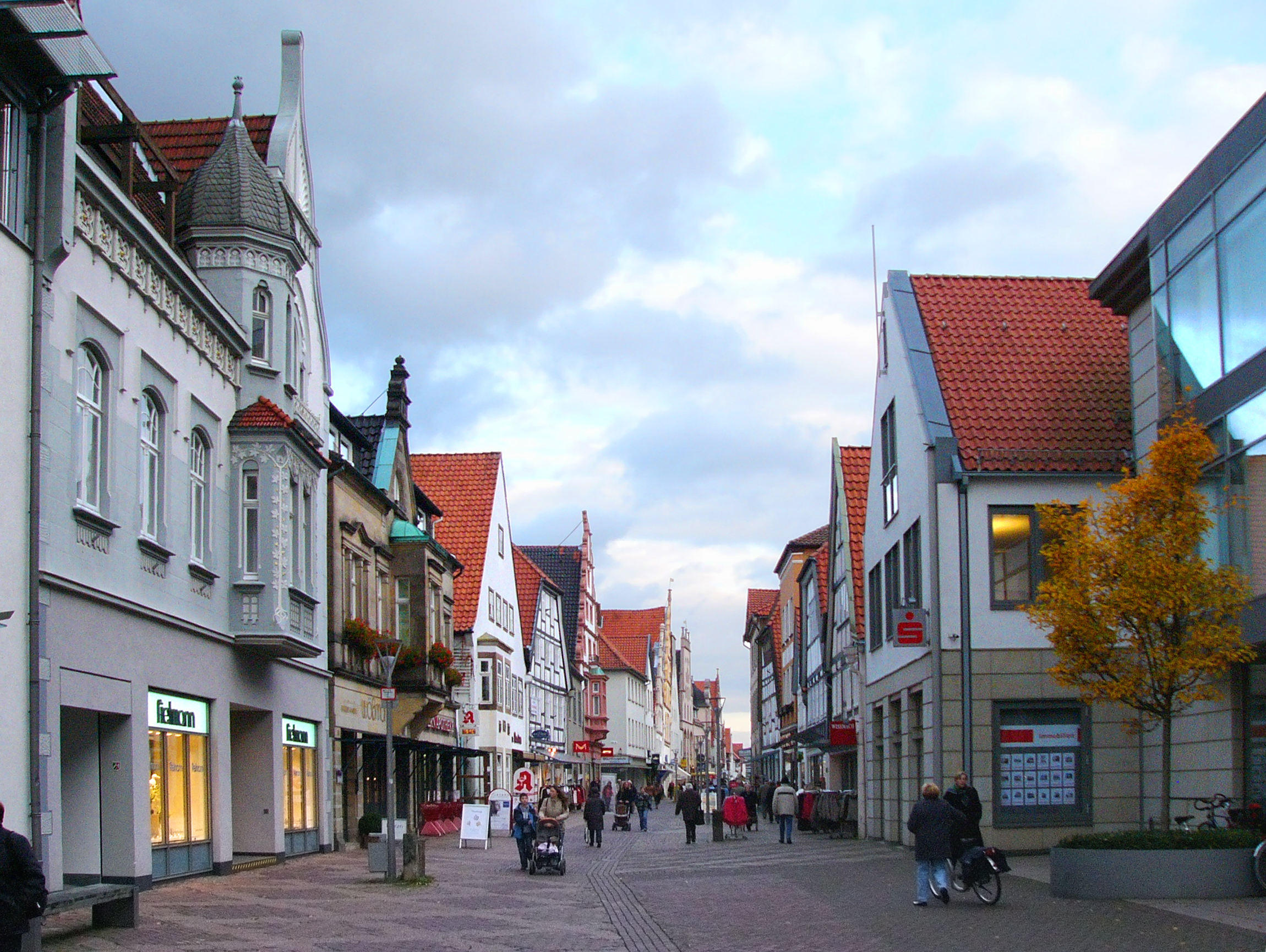
Lemgo downtown

=== British Army ===
From 1947 until 1993, Lemgo hosted successive infantry battalions of the British Army, the last one being the Royal Irish Regiment.

The battalions were based in Stornoway Barracks, known to the locals as Spiegelberg Kaserne. The base was previously the location of a displaced persons camp and before that a Wehrmacht artillery unit.

At the end of World War II, Canadian Section GHQ, 2nd Echelon, HQ 21 Army Group, occupied Spiegelberg Kaserne. After this headquarters moved to Oldenburg the site was taken over by the British Army.

== Population ==
Historical population

Year	Pop.	±% p.a.
1965	37,141	—
1970	38,984	+0.97%
1975	39,662	+0.35%
1980	39,864	+0.10%
1985	38,916	−0.48%
1990	39,485	+0.29%
1995	41,403	+0.95%

Year	Pop.	±% p.a.
2000	41,995	+0.28%
2005	42,156	+0.08%
2010	41,424	−0.35%
2015	41,276	−0.07%
2020	40,456	−0.40%
2025	39,959	−0.25%

Source: Landesdatabank Nordrhein-Westfalen

== Research and education ==
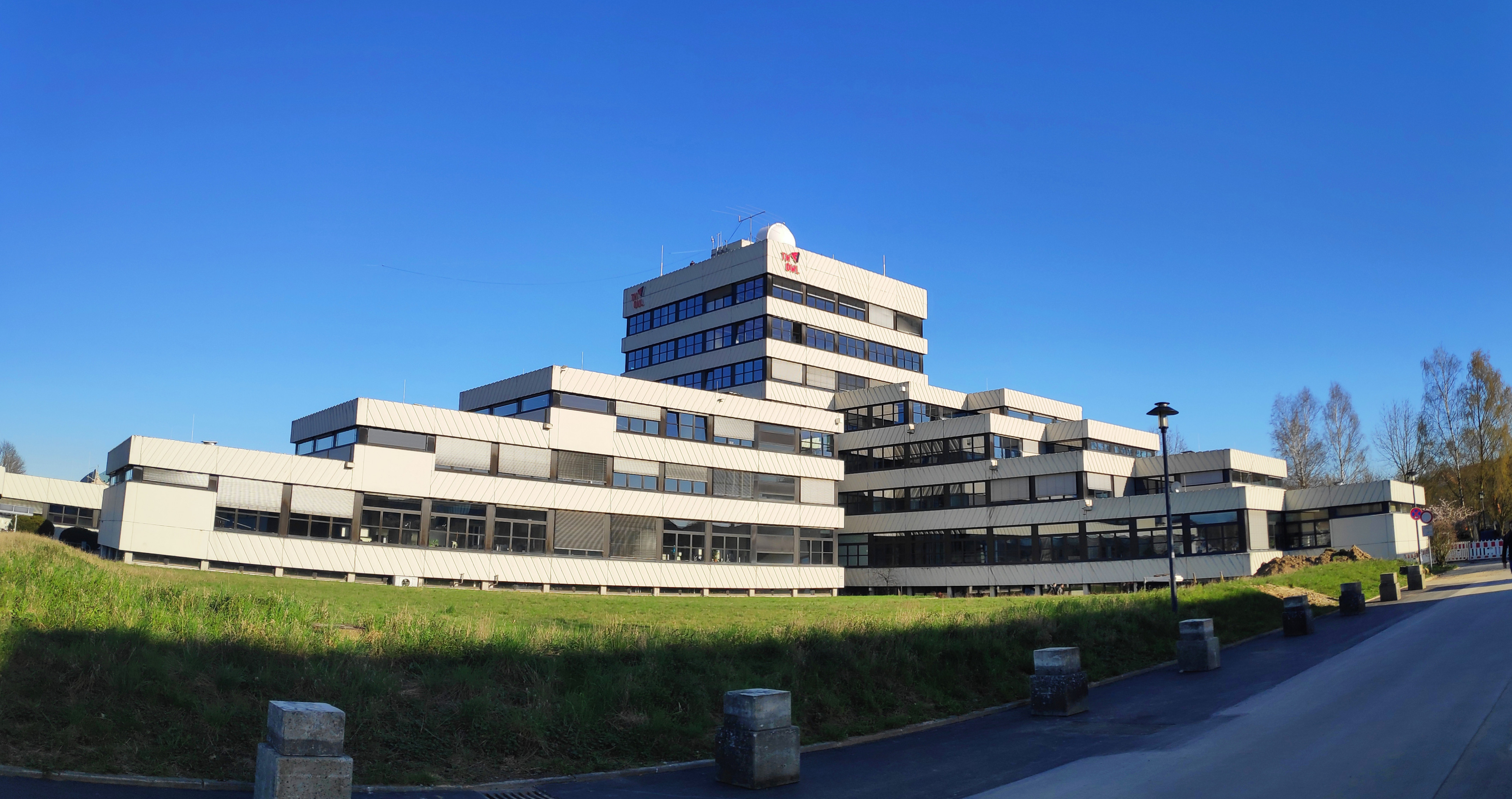
Main building of the THOWL (2019)

Lemgo is the location of the TH OWL and the Fraunhofer Institute IOSB-INA. Together with the business partners of the Centrum Industrial IT, the CIIT, a science-to-business center for Industrial Automation Technologies, and the Industry 4.0 Living Lab SmartFactoryOWL the campus site in Lemgo forms a cluster for Intelligent Systems Technologies in the OWL region.

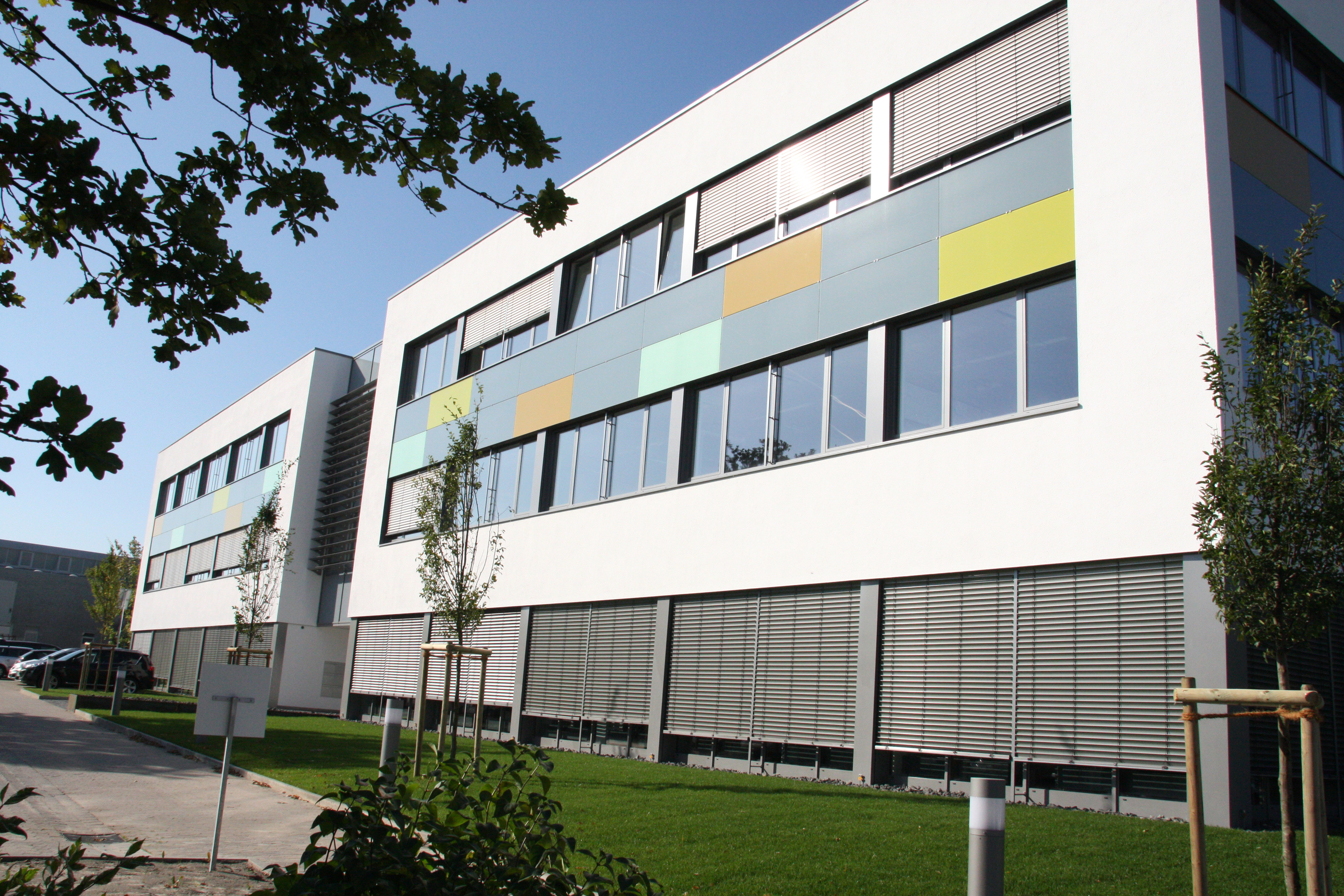
Centrum Industrial IT (CIIT): Germany's first science-to-business center in the field of intelligent automation technologies

The Innovation Campus Lemgo is a district for the digital economy, which connects existing and new actors throughout the innovation chain education – research – business. The campus forms one of the three regional centers in the technology cluster Intelligent Technical Systems Ostwestfalen-Lippe (it's OWL). There are more than 8,500 people on the innovation campus on weekdays, including around 3,600 students, 4,100 pupils, 500 academic and 250 other employees.

== Digital transformation ==
Beginning of 2018, Fraunhofer Institute in Lemgo and partners started the IoT Living Lab LemGO Digital as a reference platform for the digital transformation of small and medium sized towns.

== Transport ==
The next international airports are Paderborn Lippstadt Airport 50 km to the south, Hannover Airport 70 km to the northeast, Münster/Osnabrück 85 km to the west and Dortmund Airport 105 km to the southwest. A railway connection is served every hour by the RB 73 The Lipperländer to Bielefeld main station. With Lemgo-Lüttfeld railway station the Innovation Campus Lemgo has its own station. The next motor highway is the Bundesautobahn 2 (A2), which runs only 9 kilometers west of Lemgo and can be used via the exit Ostwestfalen-Lippe/Lemgo.

== Culture ==
Lemgo's historic centre survived the Second World War completely undestroyed. Thus, the overall urban character with the testimonies from the time of the Renaissance was preserved.

=== Museum ===
Until a few years ago, the Museum Hexenbürgermeisterhaus displayed replicas of some torture instruments from the time of the witch hunt. An exhibition about the life and work of the artist Karl Junker can be seen in the Museum Junkerhaus. The "Junkerhaus" is a work of the artist from the year 1891, provided with numerous ornate carvings. The Städtische Galerie Haus Eichenmüller exhibits temporary exhibitions of works by contemporary artists. The oil mill is a functioning watermill with an attached mill museum. The Weser Renaissance Museum Schloss Brake shows examples of art, culture and life at the time of the Weser Renaissance. The documentation and meeting place Frenkelhaus shows a permanent exhibition on the history of the Jews in Lemgo.

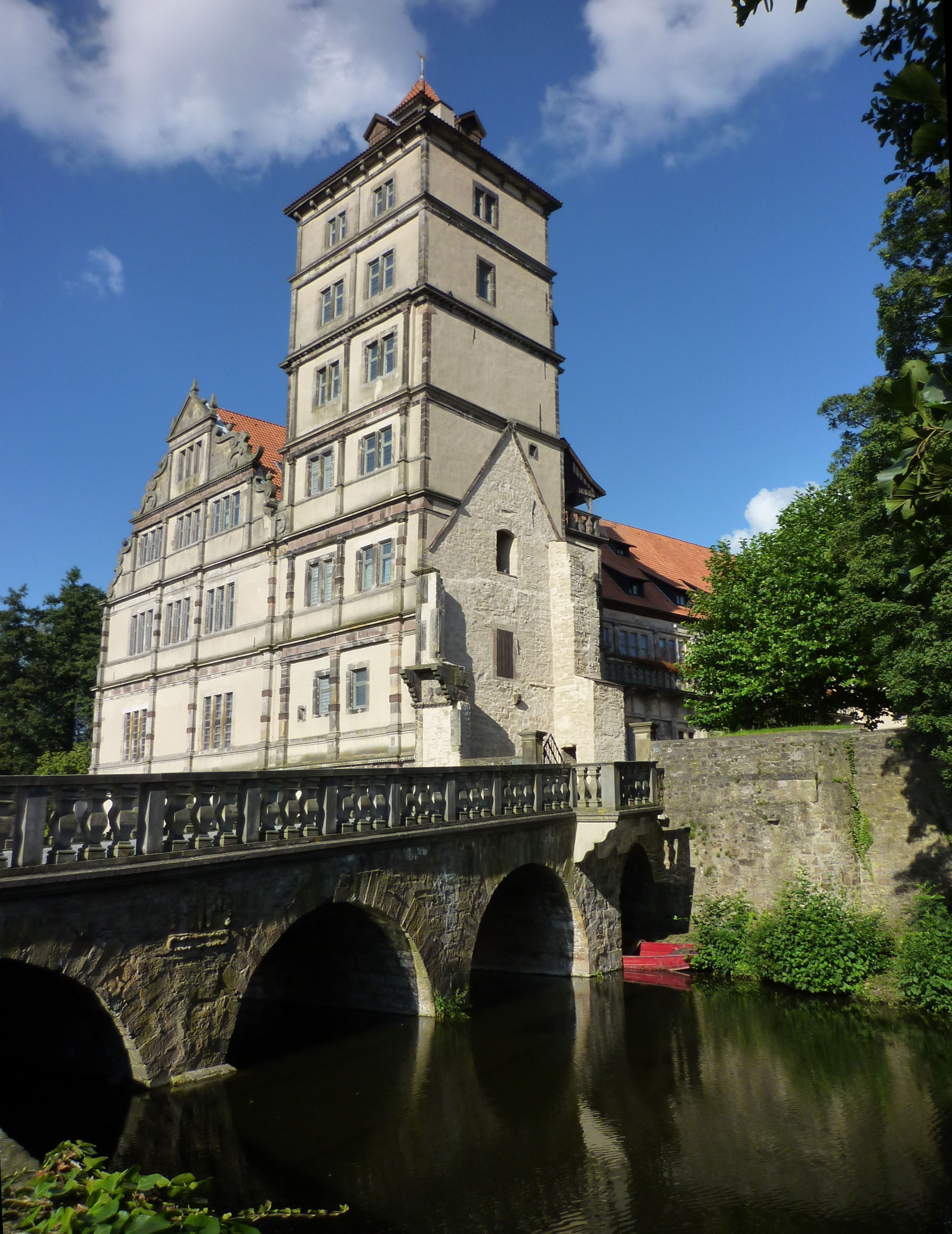
Brake Palace

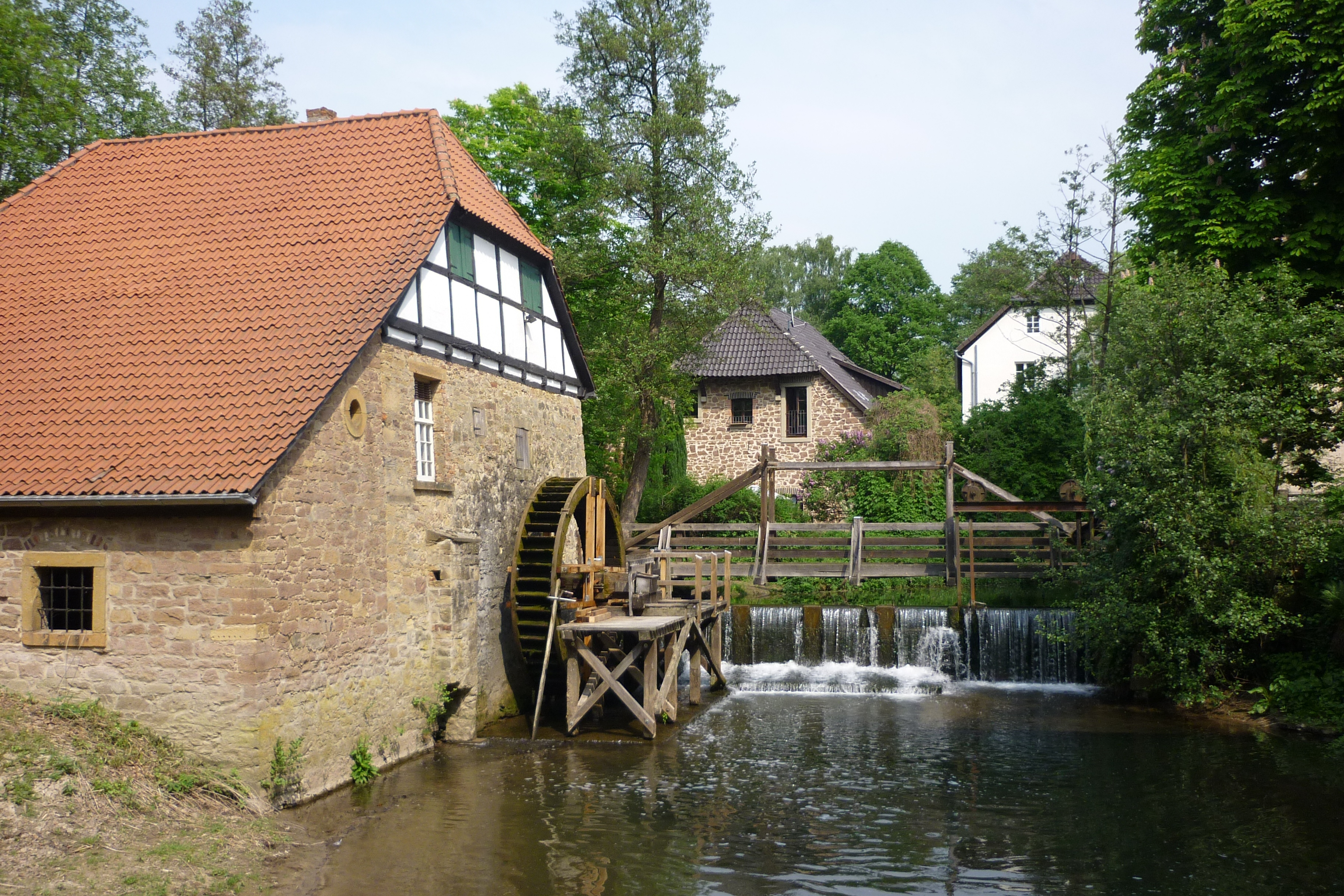
Oil Mill

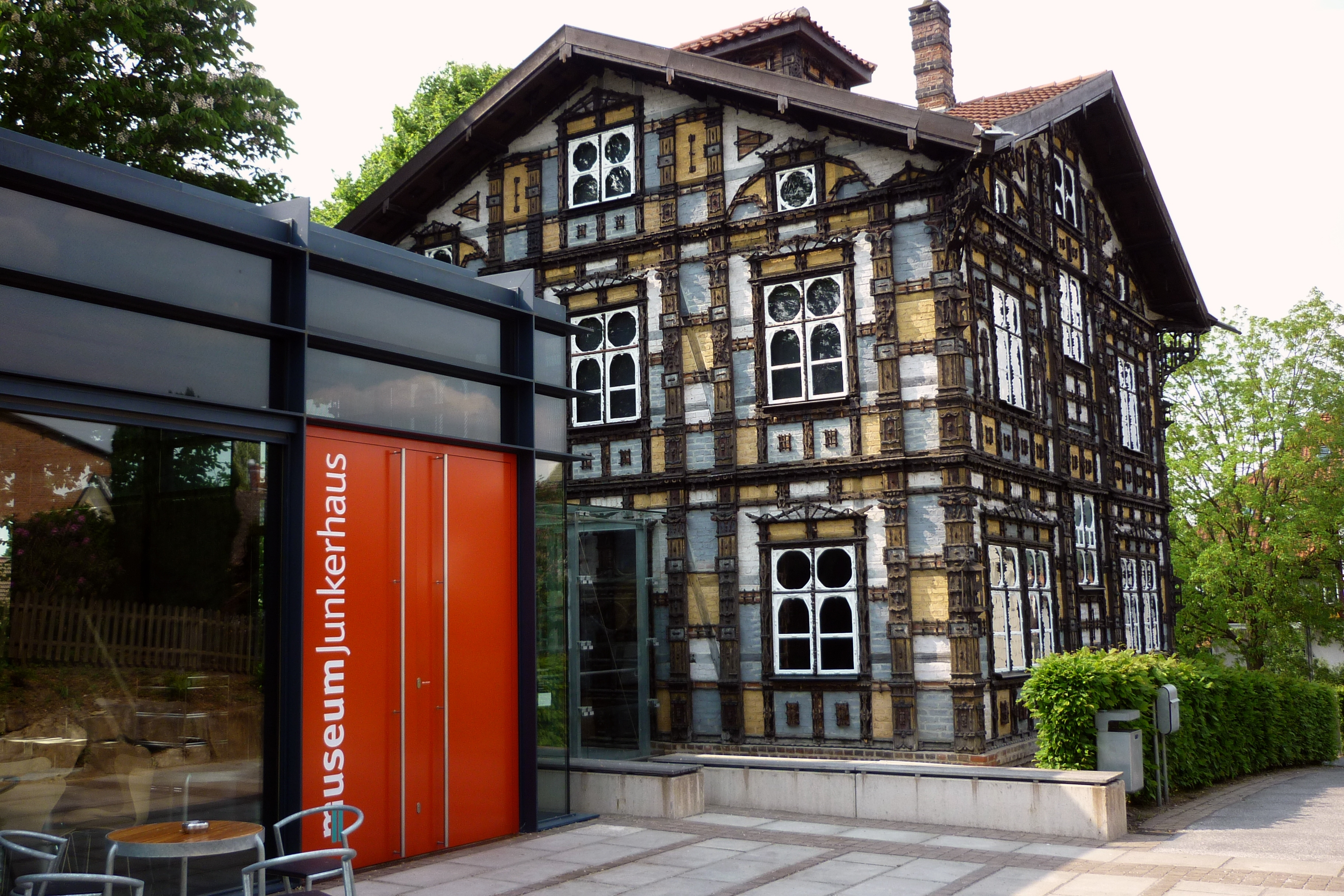
Museum Junkerhaus

=== Historical buildings ===
==== Hexenbürgermeisterhaus ====
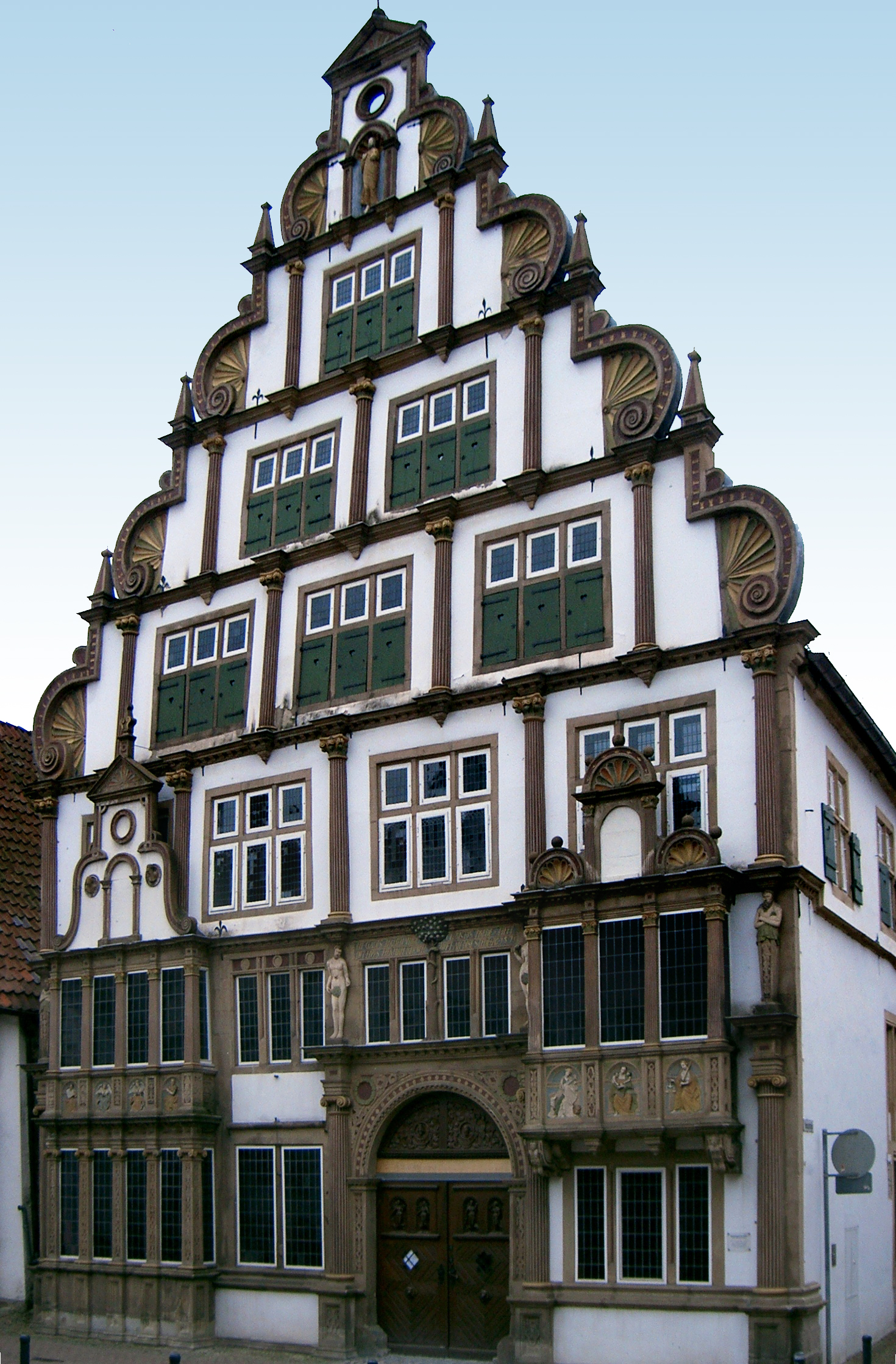
Hexenbürgermeisterhaus

The most famous house in Lemgo is the so-called Hexenbürgermeisterhaus from 1571 with a facade in the style of Weser Renaissance. Its unusual name comes from its mayor Cothmann, who officiated in the 17th century, who, out of lust for power, used the antagonism against witchcraft - an integral part of the Christian faith - to clear his political opponents out of the field. To make this clear, he had several dozen other citizens killed, both women and men. On the façade below there is a wide, richly-perforated zone of stems called 'Utluchten', a term also rarely used in specialist literature. The most typical examples were Renaissance stone buildings and half-timbered building from the 17th and 18th centuries. On the right part of the facade is a bay window on consoles. The facade above is divided by half-columns and cornices.

==== Town hall ====
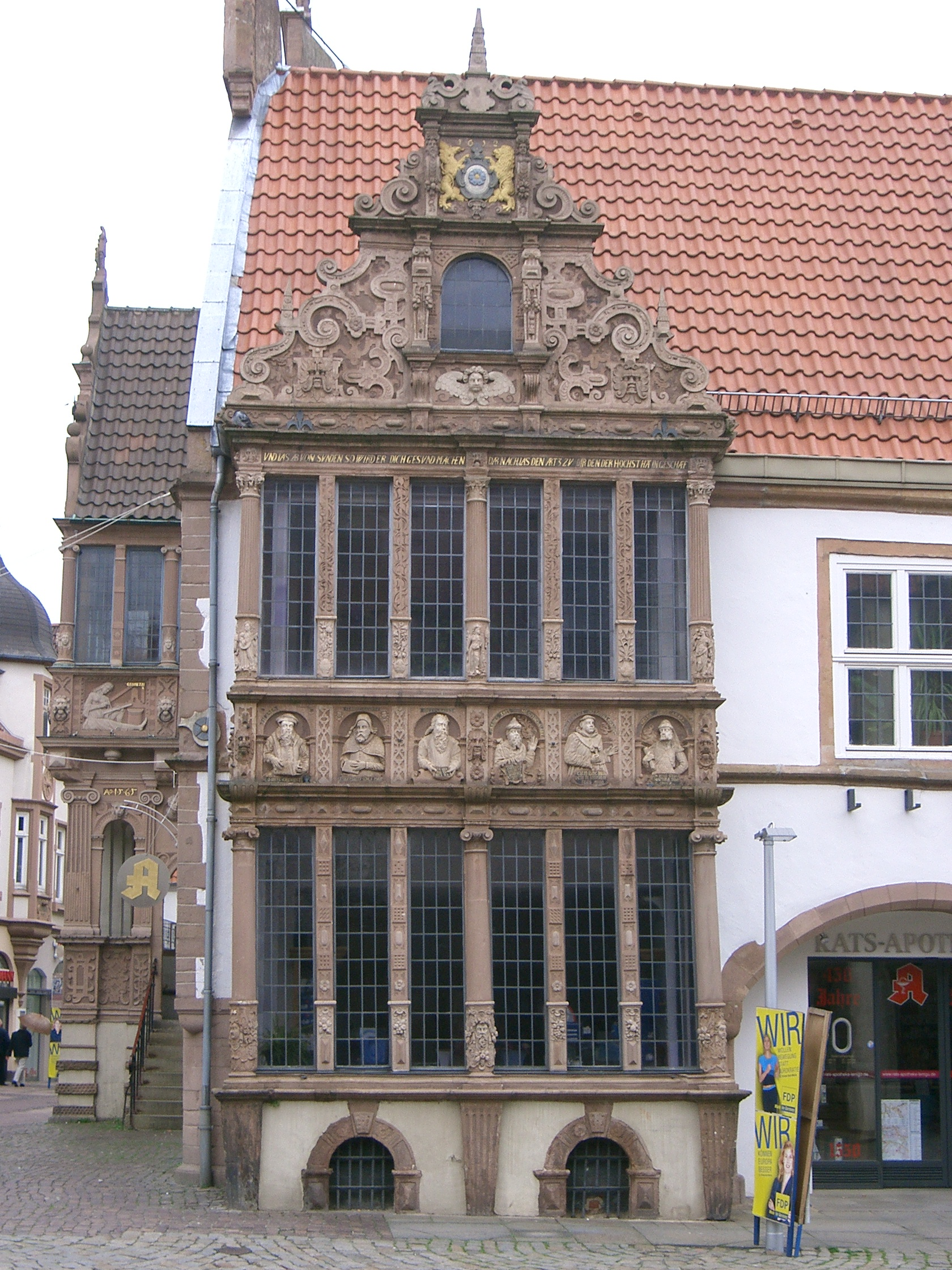
Town Hall of Lemgo

The town hall in the style of the Weser Renaissance, which was included in the UNESCO list of works of European renown, consists of parts built at different times. Such a genesis is not uncommon for large secular buildings such as town halls, because of the growing number of inhabitants and the increasing administrative activity of the cities, more and more premises were needed. Instead of new buildings, the neighboring houses were bought and extended the town hall. The oldest part is an elongated hall building dating back to the 13th century. The middle part of the building is built in Gothic [Gothic] style and dates from around 1480 to 1490. It houses the Council Chamber, including the Court Arbor. Such open ground floors belong mostly to medieval town halls, because there took place the public court hearings. Such open ground floors belong mostly to medieval town halls, because there took place the public court hearings. The most recent members of the Weser Renaissance are from the 15th and 16th centuries. The Apothecary's Corner is a showpiece with equally strict and playful language of form. Similarly in the execution is the council foliage with the Kornherrenstube upstairs on the north side of the town hall. The construction of the Neue Ratsstube is simpler and sums up the market façade of the building symmetrically with the Apothekererker.

==== Brake Castle ====
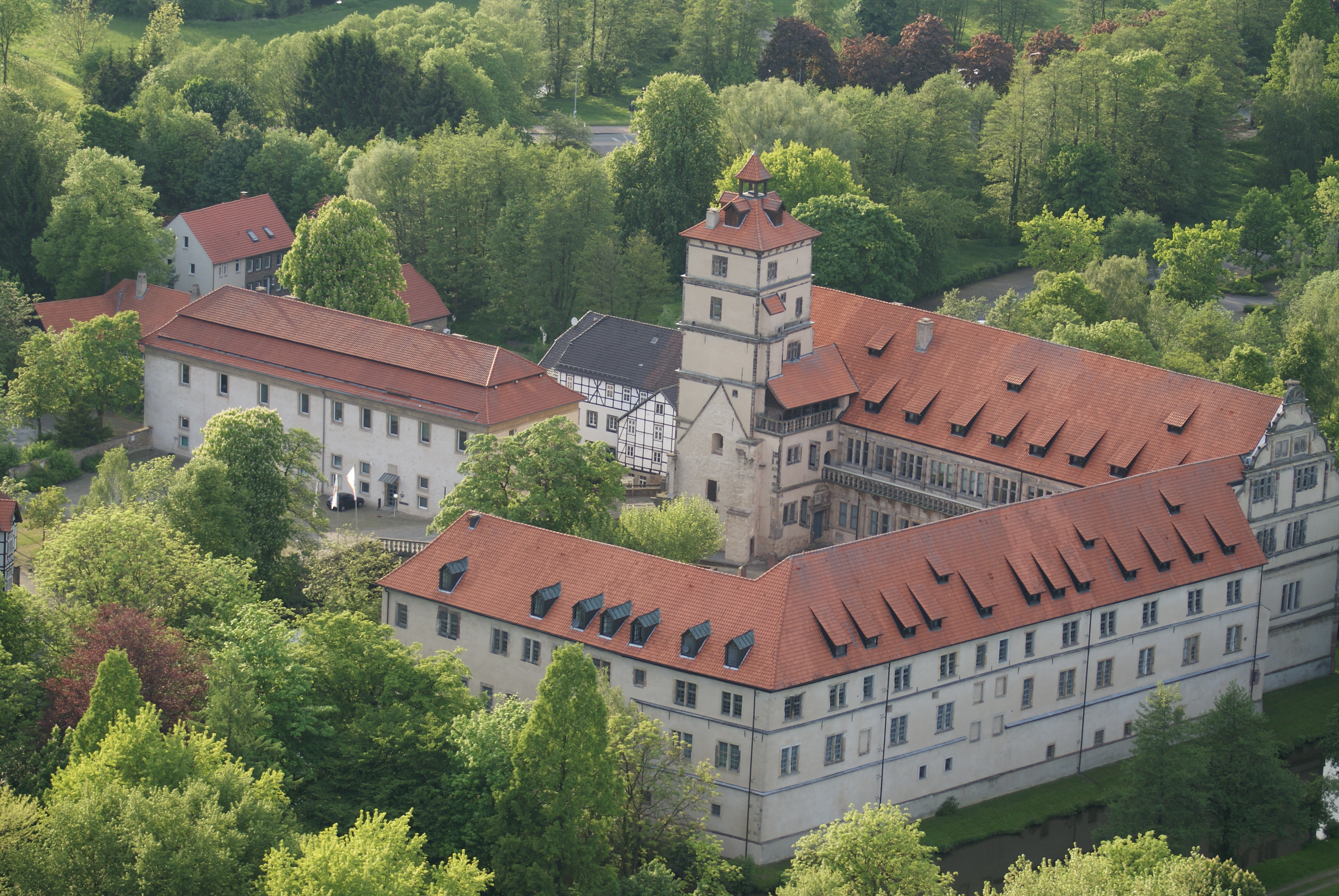
Brake Castle

The Brake Castle is an important architectural monument, whose architectural history reaches from the 12th to the 19th century. The present state of the castle is the result of renovations and extensions. After 1190, Lord Bernhard II of Lippe had built a stone castle. Their dimensions were similar to those of today's castle. In 1306 "castrum brac" was first mentioned. It was the preferred seat of the noble lords (from 1528 counts) of Lippe. In 1587 it was extended as a residence of the counts of Lippe in the style of the renaissance. It is surrounded by a moat and stands on the foundation walls of one of the largest medieval castles in Northern Germany. The striking tower makes it the widely visible landmark of the old Hanseatic town Lemgo. The buildings in the immediate vicinity of the castle still convey an impressive picture of an early-modern residence, which includes the domain, three historic mills and a wash house.

==== Other historical town houses ====
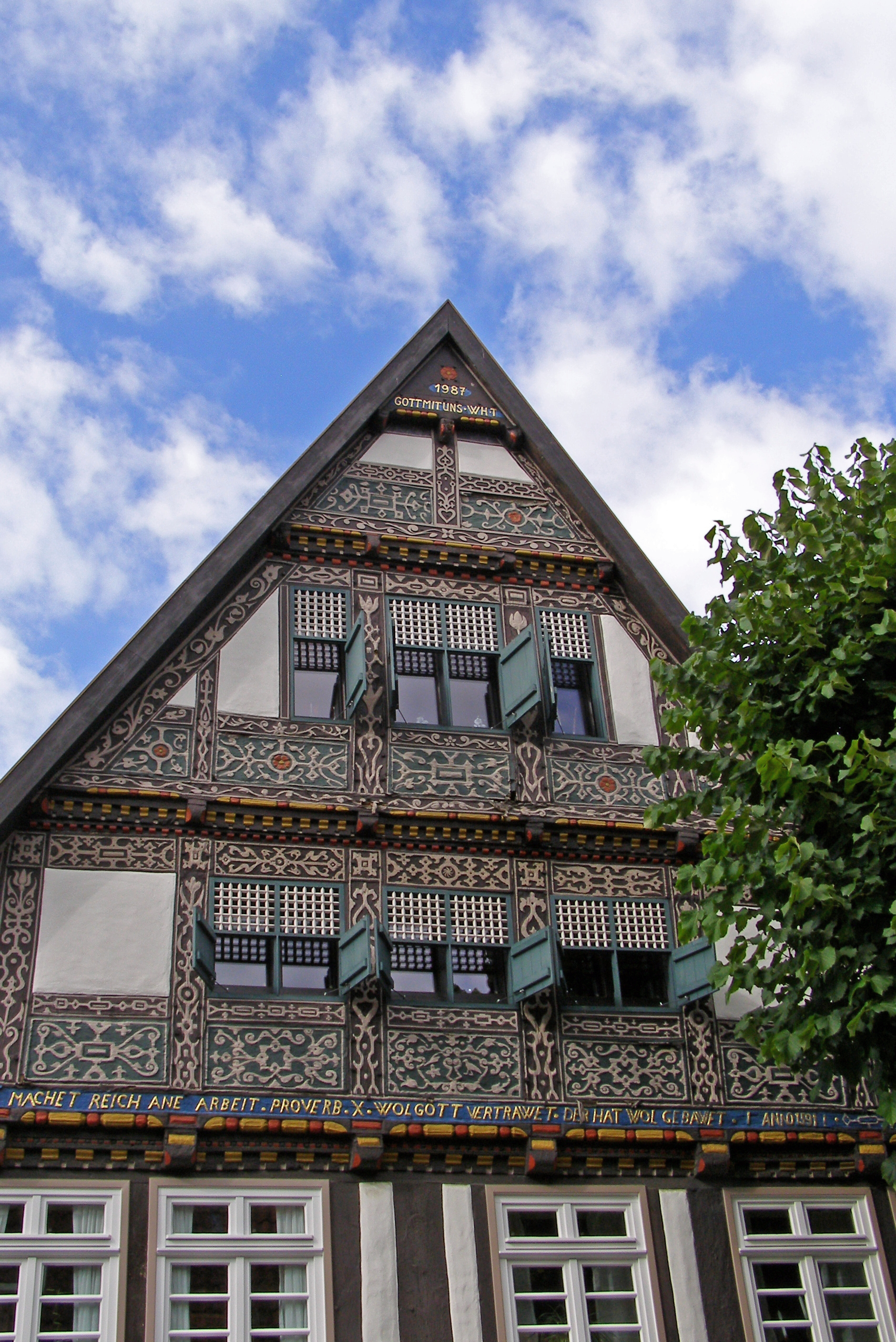
Old Bakery house, Echternstraße 92

In the historic city center a number of merchants' houses from late gothic and renaissance have survived. Here you will find half-timbered and stone houses with ornate gables, for example the "Neustädter Twins" and the former Adlerhof. Architectural research has shown that the houses Mittelstraße 54 and 56 (near the market square) have even more parts of the building from the 13th century on their back fronts and thus the rare case from the early Gothic period (Mittelstraße 54, dated to the second Half of the 13th century) or the late Romanesque art (house Mittelstraße 56, based on the arched windows dated to the first half of the 13th century) originate from prof cultivation. In Mittelstraße, which is the pedestrian zone designated shopping street in the historical city center, are the most important town houses of the city. In addition, there are hundreds of smaller half-timbered houses from the 15th to the 19th century, especially in the old town.

== Sport ==
TBV Lemgo is one the country's best handball clubs, and multiple previous league, Cup and Supercup champions as well as winning the European Cup Winner's Cup in 1996 and the European Cup in 2006.

== Twin towns – sister cities ==
Lemgo is twinned with:

- Beverley, England, United Kingdom
- Stendal, Germany
- Vandœuvre-lès-Nancy, France

Hörstmar County Primary School in Lemgo has a twin school in Holme on Spalding Moor since 1989.

== Notable people ==
- Simon VII, Count of Lippe (1587–1625), Count of Lippe
- Johann Cothmann (1588–1661), diplomat and jurist
- Philip I, Count of Schaumburg-Lippe (1601–1681), Count of Schaumburg-Lippe
- Simon Peter Tilemann (1601–1668), painter
- Engelbert Kaempfer (1651–1716), naturalist, physician and explorer
- Christian Wilhelm von Dohm (1751–1820), historian and writer
- Wilhelm Engelmann (1808–1878), publisher and bookseller
- Heinrich Schacht (1840–1912), pedagogue and ornithologist
- Fred (1876–1932) and August Duesenberg (1879–1955), Duesenberg car builders, born in Kirchheide district
- Heinrich Drake (1881–1970), politician (SPD)
- Anatol Ugorski (1942-2023), Russian-born German classical pianist
- Axel Haverich (born 1953), surgeon
- Pinar Atalay (born 1978), journalist
- Jan Rosenow (born 1979), academic
- Dominic Klemme (born 1986), road bicycle racer
- Matthias Blübaum (born 1997), chess grandmaster
