= Richard Macrory =

English environmental lawyer (born 1950)

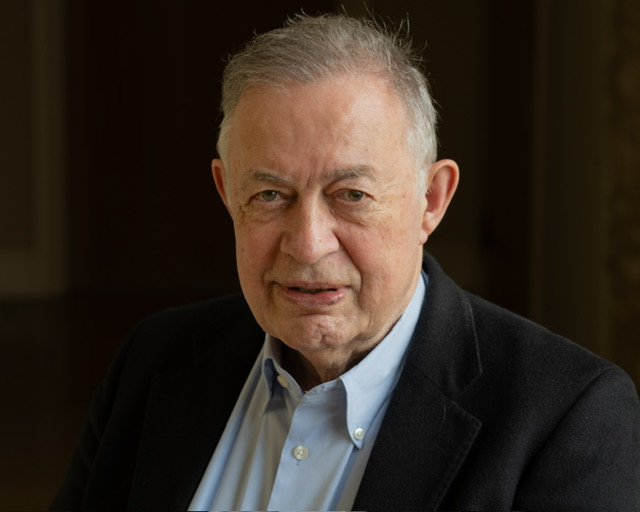
Richard Macrory in 2024. Photo by Paul Withers

Sir Richard Brabazon Macrory, CBE, Hon KC (born 30 March 1950) is a British barrister who is emeritus professor of environmental law at University College London. He is one of the leading environmental lawyers of his generation, and has had a significance influence of the development of British environmental law and policy.

Macrory served as a board member of the Environment Agency England and Wales between 1999 and 2004, and was a long-standing member of the Royal Commission on Environmental Pollution. He was the founding editor of the Journal of Environmental Law. In 2006, Macrory led the Cabinet Office Review on Regulatory Sanctions and his recommendations led to profound changes in the design and enforcement of sanctions in England and Wales. Macrory was the first chair of the UK Environmental Law Association.

Macrory is an Emeritus Professor with the Faculty of Laws, University College, London and a Research Fellow at Linacre College, Oxford.

He is the author of several books on environmental law including Regulation Enforcement and Governance in Environmental Law (2nd edition 2014) and Irresolute Clay – Shaping the Foundations of Modern Environmental Law (2020), and over 150 articles on various aspects of environmental law.

== Early life and personal ==
Macrory was born in Headley, Surrey on 30 March 1950. He was educated at Westminster School, and read jurisprudence at Christ Church, Oxford, obtaining a BA in 1971 (MA 1976).

He was called to the Bar in 1974.

Between 1975 and 1978, Macrory was the in-house lawyer at Friends of the Earth Ltd in London, and was heavily involved in the Windscale inquiry on nuclear reprocessing, then the longest planning inquiry seen in this country.

Macrory is married with two adult sons. He has British and Irish citizenship.

== Academic career ==
Macrory began his academic career at Imperial College of Science and Technology based at the newly established Centre for Environmental Technology. He was a lecturer between 1980–1989, Reader 1989-1991, and in 1991 was promoted the first Professor Environmental Law in the United Kingdom. Between 1994 and 1995 he was Director of the Environmental Change Unit, University of Oxford, and between 1991 and 1994 the Denton Hall Professor of Environmental Law, Imperial College.

In 1999 he was appointed Professor of Environmental Law at the Faculty of Laws, University College, London. In 2001 he established the Centre for Law and the Environment within the Faculty to provide a focal point for the Faculty's developing strength in teaching and research in environmental law. In 2007 set up and became director of the UCL Carbon Capture Legal Programme, a five year programme designed to explore and provide information on legal developments, nationally and internationally, in carbon capture and storage. Between 2010 and 2014 he directed a major research programme, funded by the UK Space Energy, Arts and Humanities Research Council, and Economic and Social Research Council, on the potential of using earth observation technologies as an enforcement tool in environmental law. On retirement in 2017, he was appointed an Emeritus Professor at UCL.

== Bar practice ==
Between 1989 and 1990 he was a member of European Law Chambers, London, and between 1991 and 2021 he was a door tenant at Brick Court Chambers. Most of his practice involved providing advice or written opinions, but he was junior counsel in a number of significant British environmental cases:

R v Environment Agency ex parte Dockgrange [1997) Env. LR 415 (High Court, transhipment of waste) British Waterways Board v Severn Trent (2001) 3 WLR 613 (Court of Appeal, water law) R ex parte National Grid Gas v Environment Agency (2007) UKHL 30 (House of Lords, contaminated land)

In 2019, Chambers ranked him as a Senior Statesperson in environmental law.

In 2010 he was elected a Master of the Bench, Grays Inn.

== UK Environmental Law Association ==
Between 1989 and 1992. Macrory was the first chair of the UK Environmental Law Association. In 2007 he was made a Patron of the Association, and in 2016-2018 he was co-chair of the UKELA Brexit Working Party. UKELA was neutral on the Brexit Referendum, and the Working Party produced a series of reports exploring legal implications arising from Brexit for various aspects of environmental law. In 2024 he gave UKELA's annual Garner lecture, entitled 'Confessions of a Tunneler - Lawyers and the Environment'

== Journal of Environmental Law ==
In 1988 Macrory was the founding editor of the Journal of Environmental Law, and remained editor in chief until 1992. He was then a member of the Editorial Board until 2025. In 2014 Oxford University Press established the annual Macrory prize for the most thought-provoking and innovative article published in the Journal each year.

== External appointments ==
Between 1991 and 2003 Macrory was the sole legal member of the Royal Commission on Environmental Pollution. During his term of office, eight Reports were published: Water 1992), Waste Incineration (1993), Transport (1994), Soil (1996), Transport Developments since 1994 (1997), Environmental Standards (1998), Energy (2000)), Environmental Planning (2002). During his membership, he was elected chair of the Steering Committee of the network of European Environmental Advisory Councils 2001-2003.

He was a Board Member of the Environment Agency England and Wales 1999-2004. He was a specialist advisor in environmental law to the House of Commons Select Committee on the Environment on six inquiries between 1989 and 1992 and subsequently a specialist advisor to the House of Commons Select Committee on Environment, Transport, and the Regions on its inquiries into consumer products. Between 1991 and 1992 he was a specialist advisor to the Specialist Advisor, House of Lords Select Committee on the European Communities (Environment Sub-committee) during their inquiry into enforcement and implementation of EC legislation.

Macrory was the Hon President of the National Society for Clean Air between 2004 and 2005, and was Standing Counsel to the Council for the Protection of Rural England for eleven years between 1981-1992. He was the Legal Correspondent to ENDS Report between 1986 and 2019. Between 2007 and 2008 he was a member of the Sullivan Working Group on Access to Environmental Justice. Between 1990 and 1991 he was a member of the UK National Advisory Committee on Eco-labelling (chair of the Sub-Committee on Administration.

Between 2021 and 2025, Macrory was a board member of the Office for Environmental Protection (OEP). Following Brexit, OEP was established as an independent body to hold government and other public bodies to account for implementation and enforcement of environmental law, one of a handful of such bodies in the world.

== Regulatory sanctions ==
In 2002, Macrory was commissioned by the Department of Environment Food and Rural Affairs to study the possible introduction of civil penalties for breaches of environmental law.

At the time, the only sanctions available to regulators such as the Environment Agency for breaches of most environmental laws was a criminal sanction or, where the breach was not considered serious, a caution or warning, or other informal approaches. The report argued that in addition to these existing sanctions, environmental regulators should also be able to impose civil penalties of the sort widely used in Germany and the United States.

In 2005, Macrory was commissioned by the Cabinet Office to lead a review on regulatory sanctions generally, covering some 60 national regulators as well as local authorities and dealing with nearly all areas of regulation apart from the financial sector. The Review concluded that the criminal law, while remaining important for the most serious breaches, was being overused and devalued. The Review advocated six principles that should underline an effective sanctioning system, and now officially referred to as the Macrory Principles. It recommended that regulators had access to a much richer range of regulatory responses, including civil sanctions. Macrory also identified seven characteristics that a regulator with access to a wide range of sanctioning powers should adopt. These including acting transparently and avoiding perverse incentives (such as internal targets or financial rewards for success) which might distort choices. Some of these such as the need to publish an enforcement policy are now legal requirements.

The Government accepted all the recommendations in the Macrory report, and Part III Regulatory Enforcement and Sanctions Act 2008 provides the legal framework for a range of new sanctions, based on the Review. Many regulators acquired the new powers, including the Environment Agency and Natural England in 2010. One of Macrory's proposals, now contained in s 50 Regulatory Enforcement and Sanctions Act, was a new form of sanction, an Enforcement Undertaking. Instead of a penalty being imposed by the regulator, a regulator may accept an undertaking from a company or person to take steps to prevent repetition of the breach, and to provide a voluntary donation to a charity or similar body to reflect any economic gain or damage caused by non-compliance. Enforcement Undertakings are published and are especially suitable where the breach is non-intentional or careless at the most. The Environment Agency has made extensive use of Enforcement Undertakings, and between 2022 and 2023 accepted 62 Undertakings since 2010 resulting in over £23 million being paid to environmental charities and similar bodies up until 2022.

In 2024 it was revealed during the Horizon inquiry into the Post Office scandal that the Post Office awarded staff with bonuses for successful prosecutions against sub-postmasters. Professor Macrory criticized this as being contrary to his recommendations in his Report.

== Honours ==
He was awarded a CBE in 2000 for services to environment and the law. In 2004 he was elected an Honorary Fellow of the Chartered Institute of Wastes Management, and in 2007 nominated a Patron of the UK Environmental Law Association. In 2008 he was appointed a QC Hon Causa for making a major contribution to law outside the courtroom. Described as “the world’s most prestigious award in the field of environmental law” he was awarded the Elizabeth Haub Prize for Environmental Law in 2014.

== Film and creative ==
Macrory had a long association with Merchant Ivory Film Productions. He was a production assistant of Adventures of a Brown Man in Search of Civilization (1972), assistant to the producer on Autobiography of a Princess (1972), and assistant to the Art Director on The Wild Party (1975). He appeared as an extra in a number of Merchant Ivory films, including Howards Ends (1992), (uncredited), The Golden Bowl (2000), The Mystic Masseur (2001) and The White Countess (2005). Between 1988 and 2004 he was chairman of Merchant Ivory Productions Ltd.

Macrory and a former schoolfriend Nick Young (1969-1981) invented a board game called Man-Eater! which was published in 1976 and involved four swimmers fleeing from a shark. The Guardian described it as "extremely good as games go – cerebral rather than based on chance and very simple to learn". The Financial Times reported that according to the specialist London board games shop, Just Games, it was the new game of the year. Because the swimmers had detachable legs which could be eaten by the shark, Robin Young in the Times said that Man-eater 'easily carries away the title of Worst Taste Game of the Year'. Production ceased in the early 1980s. In 2013, the American games expert, Erik Arneson, listed it as no 6 in his Top 10 Games to Play Before You Die.

Macrory’s great great uncle was Eldred Pottinger. Pottinger survived the retreat and destruction of the British army in January 1842 during the First Afghan War, and his father was author of a definitive history of the War, Signal Catastrophe, published in 1966. Richard Macrory's own interest in the period led him to write a study of the Afghan War published by Osprey 2016 in its Military History Series under the title, The First Afghan War – Invasion, Catastrophe and Retreat.

Richard Macrory is an amateur magician performing under the name The Great Marco. Amongst other venues he has appeared twice at the Stendhal Music Festival, Northern Ireland, Fiera dell' Aglio e delle Capoli 2022, Borga a Mozzano, Tuscany, and Yarnton Manor, Oxford

== Selected bibliography ==
=== Books ===
- MACRORY (2026) (ed. with Winter and Kramer) EU Environmental Policy and Law: Reflections at Fifty. Europa Law Publishing, Zutphen NL
- MACRORY (2022) (with Badger) Environment Act 2021. Text, Guide and Analysis. Harts Publishing, Oxford
- MACRORY (2020) Irresolute Clay: Shaping the Foundations of Modern Environmental Law. Harts Publishing
- MACRORY (2019) Halsbury's Laws Environmental Law (Consulting Editor). Butterworths, London
- MACRORY (ed) (2018) (with Havercroft I and Stewart R) Carbon Capture Storage – Emerging Legal and Regulatory Issues (2nd Edition) . Harts, Oxford
- MACRORY (2014) Regulation, Enforcement and Governance of Environmental Law (2nd edition). Harts, Oxford

=== Articles, chapters in books, and reports ===
- MACRORY (2026) 'Enforcement Actions by the Office for Environmental Protection: The Scorecard to Date' Journal of Planning and Environment Law, 2026 Issue 4 451-464
- MACRORY (2024) 'Innovations in Environmental Governance - the Significance of the British Office for Environmental Protection'. Environmental Policy and Law, 2024, 189-200
- MACRORY (2023) 'Breaking the Mould – Britain's New Office for Environmental Protection' Journal of Environmental Law, 2023, XX 1-14
- MACRORY (2020) (with Muinzer T) 'The UK's Climate Change Act' in Muinzer T (ed) National Climate Change Acts . Harts, Oxford
- MACRORY (2019) 'Environmental Law in the United Kingdom post Brexit' ERA Forum Journal of the Academy of European Law 19: 643-657
- MACRORY (2018) 'Strengthening the judicial handling of environmental law post-Brexit' 30 Environmental Law and Management 83-86
- MACRORY (2017) 'Carbon Capture and Storage' in Brownsword, Scotford, and Yeung (eds) Oxford Handbook on the Law and Regulation of Technology. Oxford University Press,
- MACRORY (2013) 'The Long and Winding Road- Towards an Environmental Court in England and Wales' Journal of Environmental Law Vol 25 No 3 371-382
- MACRORY (2013) 'Sanctions and Safeguards—the Brave New World of Regulatory Enforcement' Current Legal Problems 2013 Vol 66 Oxford University Press
- MACRORY (2012) 'The Role of the First Tier Environment Tribunal' [2012] Judicial Review 54-60
- MACRORY (2011) 'The Environment as an Instrument of Constitutional Change' in Jowell and Oliver. The Changing Constitution Oxford University Press
- MACRORY (2011) Consistency and Effectiveness – Strengthening the New Environmental Tribunal UCL Centre for Law and the Environment
- MACRORY (2011) 'Weighing up the Performance' Journal of Environmental Law Vol 23 No 2 311-318
- MACRORY (2010) 'Environmental Courts and Tribunals in England and Wales – A Tentative New Dawn Journal of Court Innovation' Vol 3 Number 1 61-78
- MACRORY (2010) 'Reforming Regulatory Sanctions' in Oliver, Rawlings and Prosser (eds) The Regulatory State. Oxford University Press.
- MACRORY (2008) 'Environmental Public Law and Judicial Review' Judicial Review Vol 13 No 2 115-125
- MACRORY (2008) 'Public Consultation and GMO Policy – A Very British Experiment' Journal of European Environmental and Planning Law 5.1 pp 95–107
- MACRORY (2006). Regulatory Justice – Making Sanctions Effective. Final Report. Cabinet Office, London
- MACRORY (2005) 'The Enforcement of EU Environmental Law : Some Proposals for Reform' in Macrory (ed) Reflections on 30 years of EU Environmental Law – A High Level of Protection? Europa Law Publishing, Netherlands
- MACRORY R (2004) Trust and Transparency : Reshaping Environmental Governance in Northern Ireland. Centre for Law and the Environment, University College, London
- MACRORY and WOODS (2003) Environmental Civil Penalties – A More Proportionate Response to Regulatory Breach. Centre for Law and the Environment, University College, London
- MACRORY R with WOODS M (2003) Modernizing Environmental Justice : Regulation and the Role of an Environmental Tribunal. Centre for Law and the Environment, University College, London
- MACRORY R and PURDY R (2003) 'Satellite photographs : 21st Century Evidence?' New Law Journal, Vol 153 No 7070 337-338
- MACRORY R (2002) 'Regulating in a Risky Environment' in Freeman M (ed), Current Legal Problems 2001, Oxford University Press, Oxford
- MACRORY, R (1999) 'The Amsterdam Treaty: An Environmental Perspective' in O'Keeffe and Twomey P (eds) Legal Issues of the Amsterdam Treaty. Hart Publishing, pp 171–183
- MACRORY, R (1999) 'The Environment and Constitutional Change' in Hazell R. (ed) Constitutional Futures - A History of the Next Ten Years. Oxford University Press, Oxford. 178-195
- MACRORY, R (1996) 'Environmental Citizenship and the Law - Repairing the European Road' Journal of Environmental Law 8 no 2
- MACRORY, R, (1992) 'Environmental Assessment and EC Law' Journal of Environmental Law. Vol. 4 No. 2, pp 298–304
- MACRORY, R, (1992) 'The Enforcement of Community Environmental Law: Some Critical Issues' Common Market Law Review. Vol. 29: 347-369
