= School of Geography and the Environment, University of Oxford =

School of Geography and the Environment
- Type: Academic department
- Established: 1899
- Founders: Halford Mackinder
- Academic affiliations: University of Oxford
- Location: Oxford, United Kingdom
- Website: www.geog.ox.ac.uk

The School of Geography and the Environment (SoGE) is an academic department at the Social Sciences Division at the University of Oxford in Oxford, England, United Kingdom. It is located in the Oxford University Centre for the Environment on South Parks Road.

The department is well known for its research-based curriculum. It has been ranked the world's top geography department for 15 consecutive years by the QS World University Rankings by Subject.

SoGE has a unique academic curriculum. The curriculum of an undergraduate student consists of both physical and human geography as well as GIS and cartography. It focuses on both physical and human geography while giving the opportunity to specialize in a particular topic.

SoGE houses three research centres: the Environmental Change Institute (ECI), the Smith School of Enterprise and the Environment (SSEE), and the Transport Studies Unit (TSU).

== History ==
In 1887, Halford John Mackinder was appointed as the university's first lecturer in geography. The School of Geography (as it was then known) was established in 1899.

Initially, the School was housed on the upper floor of the Old Ashmolean building, but it outgrew these premises and began renting temporary rooms on Broad Street in 1909. In 1910 it moved into part of Acland House in Broad Street. In 1922 the School moved to Holywell House on Mansfield Road. In 2009, it was renamed as the School of Geography and the Environment. British Geography played quite an important role exploring and documenting the different parts of the earth surface.

== Notable people ==
- Andrew Goudie
- Ceri Peach
- Danny Dorling
- Gillian Rose
- Jim Hall
- Richard Washington
- Myles Allen
