= Fennec (climate program) =

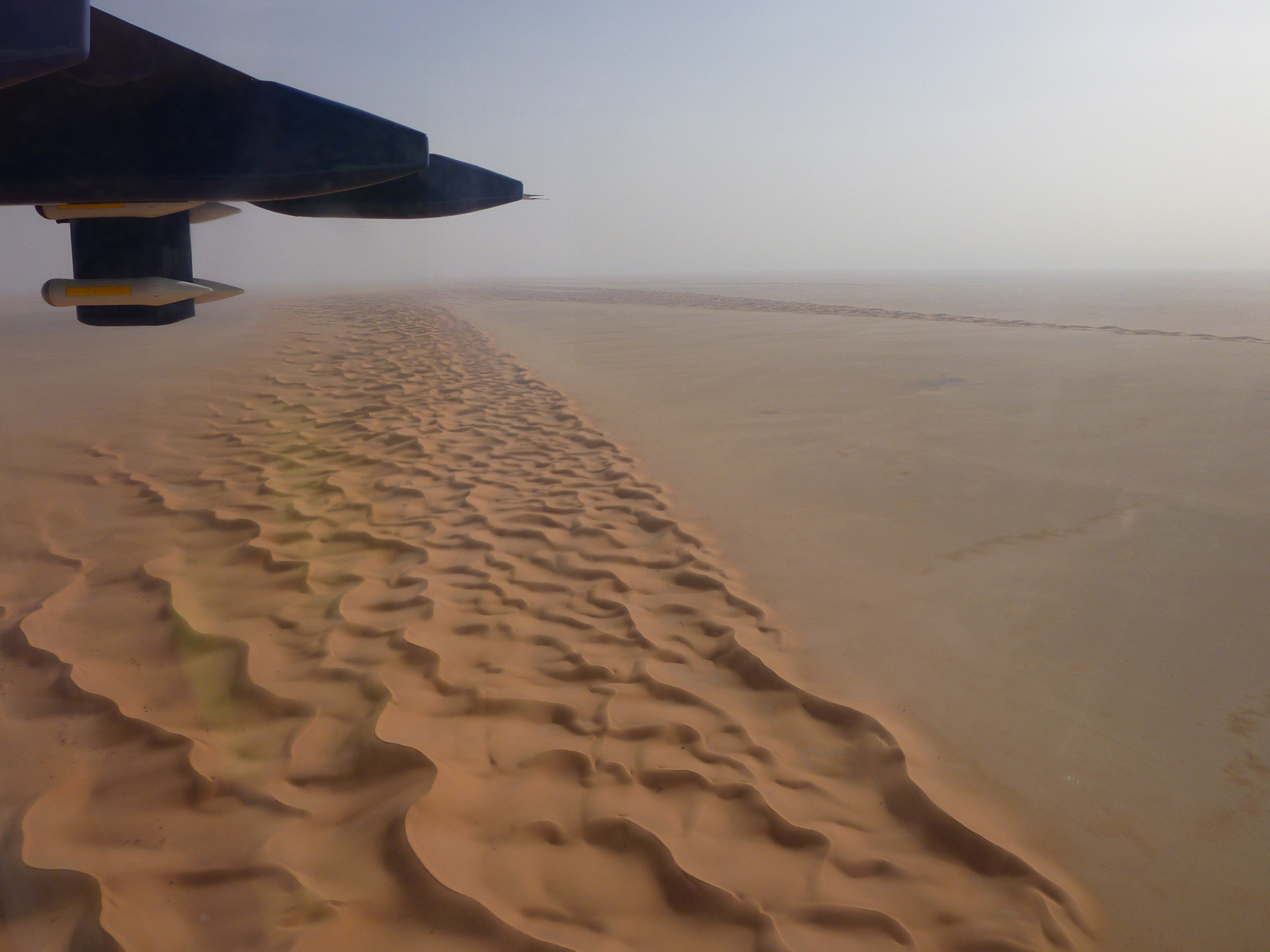
Instrumented FAAM BAe-146 over Northern Mauritania, April 2011 on the Fennec Campaign

Fennec is a large-scale, international, multi-institutional, multi-platform, observational, modelling and satellite climate program in the Saharan Heat Low region (southern Algeria, eastern Morocco, Northern Mauritania, Northern Mali and Northern Niger). The Saharan Heat Low is a key component of the West African Monsoon and is the location of the largest mineral aerosol loadings on the planet in the northern summer.

The inhospitable, vast area of the Heat Low has virtually no routine meteorological observations: knowledge of the key atmospheric processes in this important region is therefore very limited, and this knowledge deficit results in reduced performance of both weather and climate prediction in and well beyond the north/west African region. The Fennec project was designed to address this knowledge deficit, and it is the first major climate program in the central Sahara. The ideas for Fennec, which is a British, French, and German initiative, grew out of the African Multidisciplinary Monsoon Analysis (AMMA). Fennec is the project name – it is not an acronym.

== Fennec goals ==
Broad goals of the Fennec project include:

- A new and definitive data set for central Sahara from aircraft, ground, model and satellite observations;
- Characterisation of thermodynamic, dynamic and compositional structure of central Sahara’s atmosphere;
- A quantitative assessment of weather prediction and climate model errors and how these can be reduced;
- The mechanisms of dust emission, transport and radiative forcing from the planet’s largest summer source.

== Observational programme ==
The Fennec observational programme included ground sites at Bordj Badji Mokhtar in Algeria, Zouerat in Mauritania, as well as 8 automatic weather stations located in the remote desert in both Algeria and Mauritania. The Bordj Badji Mokhtar station is in the remote Sahara on the Mali-Algerian border. In June 2011, an array of instrumentation designed to monitor the troposphere was set up at Bordj Badi Mokhtar. The instrumentation included Lidar, sodar, 4-8 radiosondes daily, a flux tower and aerosol sampling equipment (AERONET cimel Sun photometer, nephelometer and filters).

A reduced array of instruments was run on this site in June 2012. Similar equipment (sodar, flux tower, cimel photometer) ran at Zouerat in Mauritania in June 2011. Radiosondes were also released through June 2011 and June 2012 at higher frequency than the normal operational times at Tamanrasset, Tindouf and In Salah in Algeria.

Aircraft campaigns with the instrumented UK FAAM aircraft were conducted in April 2011, June 2011, and June 2012. The June 2011 campaign also included the instrumented French Falcon F20. Over 200 hours of science flights, many at low level (150 feet above the surface), were conducted as part of the Fennec campaign. The first in-situ data of the central Saharan atmosphere was captured and is currently being analysed.

== Core Fennec institutions ==
Institutions associated with the Fennec project include:

- University of Oxford (Lead Institution): Dust, aircraft and ground-based observations; contact: Professor Richard Washington (Fennec Principal Investigator)
- University of Leeds: Dynamics, ground-based observations, dust, aircraft observations; contact: Professor Doug Parker
- University of Sussex: Dust, ground-based observations, aircraft observations; contact: Professor Martin Todd
- University of Reading: Radiation, aircraft; contact: Professor Ellie Highwood
- Imperial College London: Earth Observation; contact Dr Helen Brindley
- Fennec France: Aircraft, Dynamics, dust; contact: Dr Cyrille Flamant
- Office National Meteorologie Algerie: ground-based observations; contact: Azzedine Saci
- Office National Meteorologie Mauritania: ground-based observations; contact: Mohamed Bechir
- Met Office: aircraft, numerical modelling and forecast products

Additional partners include: FAAM; SAFIRE; Paola Formenti (LISA); Vanderlei Martins (UMBC); DMN Maroc, contact Noureddine Filali; Harald Sodemann (ETH Zurich); Andreas Fink (ground-based obs in Morocco); Goran Pejanovic (SEEVCCC); Slobodan Nickovic (WMO)

The project was funded by the Natural Environmental Research Council and the French National Center for Scientific Research (CNRS) with an additional contribution from ONM Algerie.
