= Wedding of Queen Victoria and Prince Albert =

1840 British royal wedding

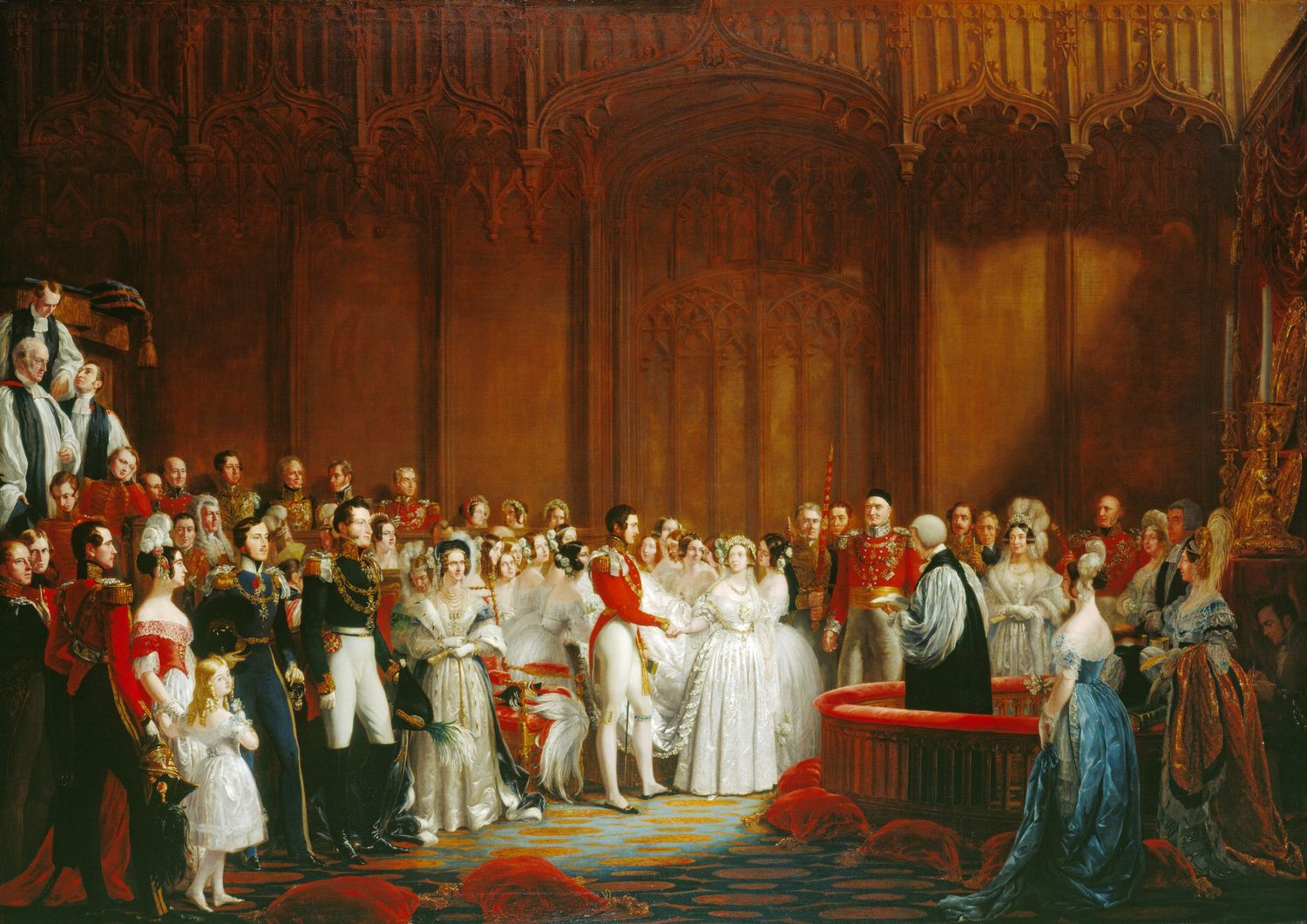
- Marriage of Victoria and Albert. Painting by George Hayter, 1842
- Date: 10 February 1840; 186 years ago
- Venue: Chapel Royal, St James's Palace
- Location: London, England
- Participants: Queen Victoria; Prince Albert of Saxe-Coburg and Gotha

The wedding of Queen Victoria of the United Kingdom and Prince Albert of Saxe-Coburg and Gotha (later Prince Consort) took place on 10 February 1840 at the Chapel Royal, St James's Palace, in London. The marriage united the young British sovereign with her German-born first cousin, strengthening dynastic ties within Europe's network of royal families. As the reigning monarch, Victoria played a central role in shaping the ceremony, including the decision to wear a white satin gown trimmed with lace hand-made in Honiton and Beer, Devon, a choice that helped popularize the white wedding dress in Western bridal fashion.

The event attracted widespread public interest and was celebrated as a symbol of stability early in Victoria's reign. Albert went on to become one of the most influential royal consorts in British history, supporting the queen in matters of governance, science, education, and the arts. Their partnership produced nine children whose marriages further interconnected the royal houses of Europe, contributing to Victoria's later reputation as the "grandmother of Europe." The wedding and subsequent marriage had lasting cultural and political significance, shaping perceptions of monarchy, domestic virtue, and royal patronage throughout the 19th century.

== Marriage ==
Though she was Queen, Victoria as an unmarried young woman was required by social convention to live with her mother, despite their differences over the Kensington System and her mother's continued reliance on Sir John Conroy. Her mother was consigned to a remote apartment in Buckingham Palace, and Victoria often refused to meet her. When Victoria complained to Lord Melbourne that her mother's proximity promised "torment for many years", Melbourne sympathised but said it could be avoided by marriage, which Victoria called a "shocking alternative". She showed interest in Albert's education for the future role he would have to play as her husband, but she resisted attempts to rush her into marriage.

Victoria was greatly impressed by Prince Albert during his second visit in October 1839. Albert and Victoria felt mutual affection and the Queen proposed to him on 15 October 1839, just five days after he had arrived at Windsor Castle. They were married on 10 February 1840, in the Chapel Royal of St James's Palace, London. Victoria was besotted. She spent the evening after their wedding lying down with a headache, but wrote ecstatically in her diary:

I NEVER, NEVER spent such an evening!!! MY DEAREST DEAREST DEAR Albert [...] his excessive love & affection gave me feelings of heavenly love & happiness I never could have hoped to have felt before! He clasped me in his arms, & we kissed each other again & again! His beauty, his sweetness & gentleness—really how can I ever be thankful enough to have such a Husband! [...[ to be called by names of tenderness, I have never yet heard used to me before—was bliss beyond belief! Oh! This was the happiest day of my life!

Albert became an important political adviser as well as the Queen's companion, replacing Lord Melbourne as the dominant, influential figure in the earlier part of her reign.

The wedding of Victoria and Albert remains the most recent wedding of a reigning British monarch. All monarchs since Victoria were already married when they ascended the throne, except for Edward VIII, who remained unmarried throughout his brief reign and married after his abdication.

== Wedding dress ==
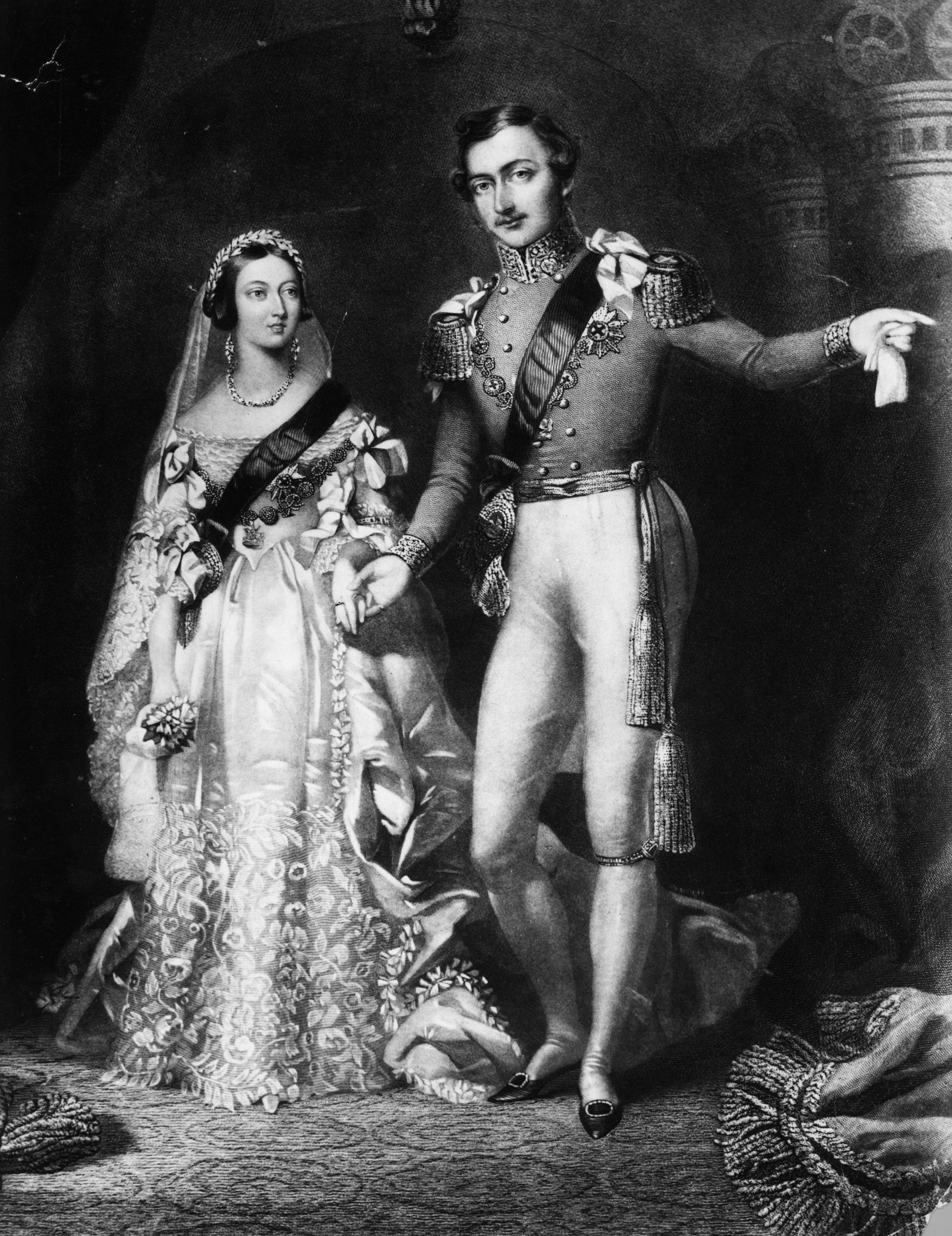
Queen Victoria and Prince Albert

The lace was designed by William Dyce, head of the then Government School of Design (later known as the Royal College of Art), and mounted on a white satin dress made by Mary Bettans.

The plain white satin wedding dress was woven in Spitalfields, east London, and trimmed with a deep flounce and trimmings of lace hand-made in Honiton and Beer, in Devon. This demonstrated support for English industry, particularly the cottage industry for lace. The handmade lace motifs were appliquéd onto machine-made cotton net. Orange blossoms, a symbol of fertility, also trimmed the dress and made up Victoria's wreath, which she wore instead of a tiara over her veil. The veil, which matched the flounce of the dress, was 4 yards (3.7 m) in length and 0.75 yards (0.69 m) wide. Her jewellery consisted of a Turkish diamond necklace and earrings (presented to her by Sultan Mahmud II of Turkey in 1838), and a sapphire brooch given to her by Albert on the eve of the wedding. The slippers she wore matched the white colour of the dress. The train of the dress, carried by her bridesmaids, measured 18 feet (5.5 m) long.

Queen Victoria described her choice of dress in her journal thus: "I wore a white satin dress, with a deep flounce of Honiton lace, an imitation of an old design. My jewels were my Turkish diamond necklace & earrings & dear Albert's beautiful sapphire brooch."

== Guests ==
=== Bride's family ===
- The Duchess of Kent and Strathearn, the bride's mother
- Queen Adelaide, the bride's paternal aunt by marriage
- The Princess Augusta Sophia, the bride's paternal aunt
- The Duke of Sussex, the bride's paternal uncle
- The Duke and Duchess of Cambridge, the bride's paternal uncle and aunt
  - Prince George of Cambridge, the bride's first cousin
  - Princess Augusta of Cambridge, the bride's first cousin
  - Princess Mary Adelaide of Cambridge, the bride's first cousin
- Princess Sophia of Gloucester, the bride's first cousin once removed

=== Groom's family ===
- The Duke of Saxe-Coburg and Gotha, the groom's father
  - The Hereditary Prince of Saxe-Coburg and Gotha, the groom's brother

=== Bridesmaids ===
- Lady Mary Howard (1822–1897), daughter of the Duke of Norfolk, later Baroness Foley of Kidderminster;
- Lady Caroline Gordon-Lennox (1819–1890), daughter of the Duke of Richmond and Lennox, later Countess of Bessborough;
- Lady Adelaide Paget (1820–1890), daughter of the Marquess of Anglesey, later Lady Adelaide Cadogan;
- Lady Eleanora Paget (1820–1848), granddaughter of the 1st Marquess of Anglesey, later Lady Graham;
- Lady Elizabeth Howard (1816–1891), daughter of the Earl of Carlisle, later Lady Grey;
- Lady Wilhelmina Stanhope (1819–1901), daughter of the Earl Stanhope, later Duchess of Cleveland;
- Lady Sarah Villiers (1822–1853), daughter of the Earl of Jersey, later Princess Esterházy;
- Lady Elizabeth Sackville-West (1818–1897), daughter of the Earl De La Warr, later Duchess of Bedford;
- Lady Ida Hay (1821–1867), daughter of the Earl of Erroll and granddaughter of William IV, later Countess of Gainsborough;
- Lady Frances Cowper (1820–1880), daughter of the 5th Earl Cowper, later Viscountess Jocelyn;
- Lady Mary Grimston (1821–1879), daughter of the Earl of Verulam, later Countess of Radnor;
- Lady Jane Pleydell-Bouverie (1819–1903), sister-in-law of the above, daughter of the Earl of Radnor, later Lady Jane Ellice.
