= Lady Sarah Child-Villiers =

19th-century British noblewoman

- Princess Esterházy of Galántha
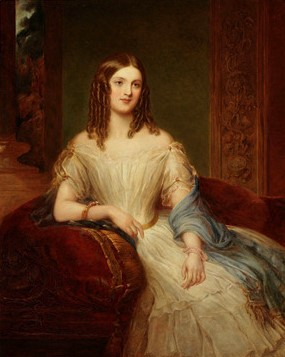
- Lady Sarah Child-Villiers, wife of Nikolaus III, Prince Esterházy
- Born: Lady Sarah Frederica Caroline Child-Villiers; 12 August 1822; Berkeley Square, London, England
- Died: 7 November 1853 (aged 31); Torquay, Devon, England
- Spouse: Nikolaus III, Prince Esterházy (m. 1842)
- Issue: Paul IV, Prince Esterházy; Prince Alajos György; Prince Adolf; Princess Sára Zsofia; Princess Maria Terézia; Prince Antal Miklós
- Father: George Child Villiers, 5th Earl of Jersey
- Mother: Lady Sarah Sophia Fane

Lady Sarah Frederica Caroline Child-Villiers (12 August 1822 – 17 November 1853) was an English aristocrat from the Villiers family who married into the Hungarian House of Esterházy. She was styled as Princess Esterházy of Galántha from 8 February 1842 until her death through her marriage to Nikolaus III, 9th Prince Esterházy of Galántha.

== Early life ==
Lady Sarah was born in London, the daughter of George Child Villiers, 5th Earl of Jersey, and Lady Sarah Sophia Fane. Her mother was one of the famously patronesses of Almack's, the most exclusive social club in London, and a leader of the ton during the Regency era. Lady Jersey was known by the nickname Silence; the nickname was ironic since, famously, she almost never stopped talking. The memoirist Captain Gronow, who disliked her, called her "a theatrical tragedy queen", and considered her "ill-bred and inconceivably rude". She was also the eldest grandchild and heiress of Robert Child, the principal shareholder of the banking firm Child & Co.

Her paternal grandmother, Frances Villiers, Countess of Jersey, was one of the more notorious mistresses of King George IV when he was Prince of Wales.

She served as a bridesmaid at the wedding of Queen Victoria to Prince Albert in 1840.

== Marriage ==
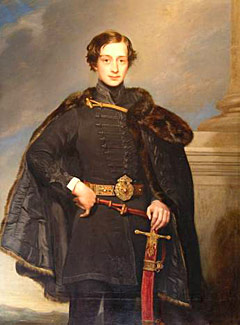
Prince Nikolaus III of Esterházy

Lady Sarah married the Hungarian Prince Nikolaus Paul Esterházy of Galántha on 8 February 1842. Prince Nikolaus was the son of Prince Paul Anton Esterházy of Galántha, a Hungarian diplomat who was Ambassador to England, and his wife, Princess Maria Theresia Esterhazy von Galantha née Thurn and Taxis. Lady Jersey and Princess Esterházy were both Patronesses of Almack's and great friends. After marriage, Sarah's title in English became Princess Nicholas Esterhazy von Galantha. They had six children.

== Death ==
Lady Sarah developed consumption and sought cures in the spa towns of Ischl and Ems before returning to England in the hope her "native air" would heal her lungs. She died at Torquay, Devon, on 17 November 1853.
