= Masquerade ball =

Event in which participants attend in costume wearing a mask

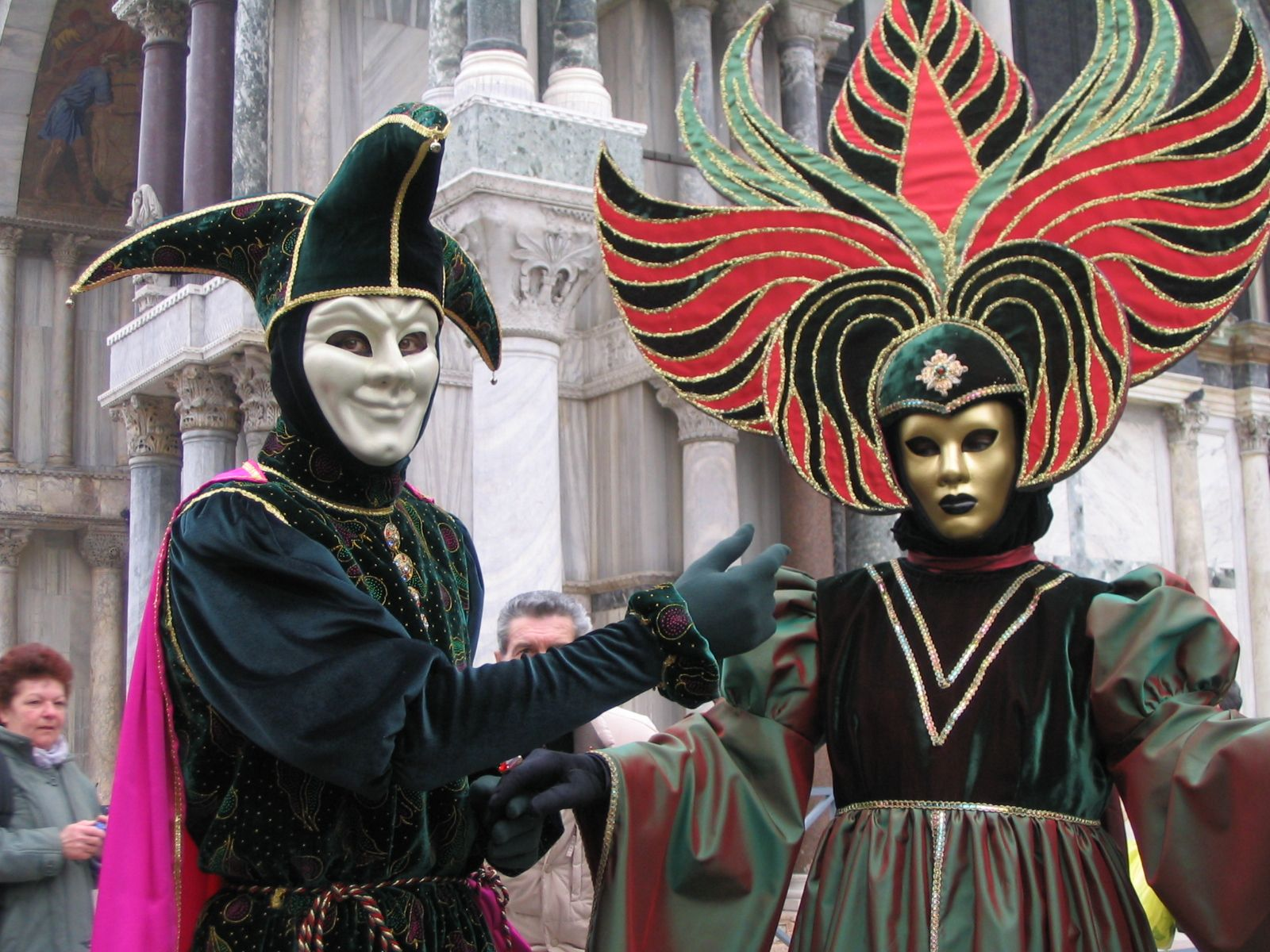
Masquerade ball at the Carnival of Venice.

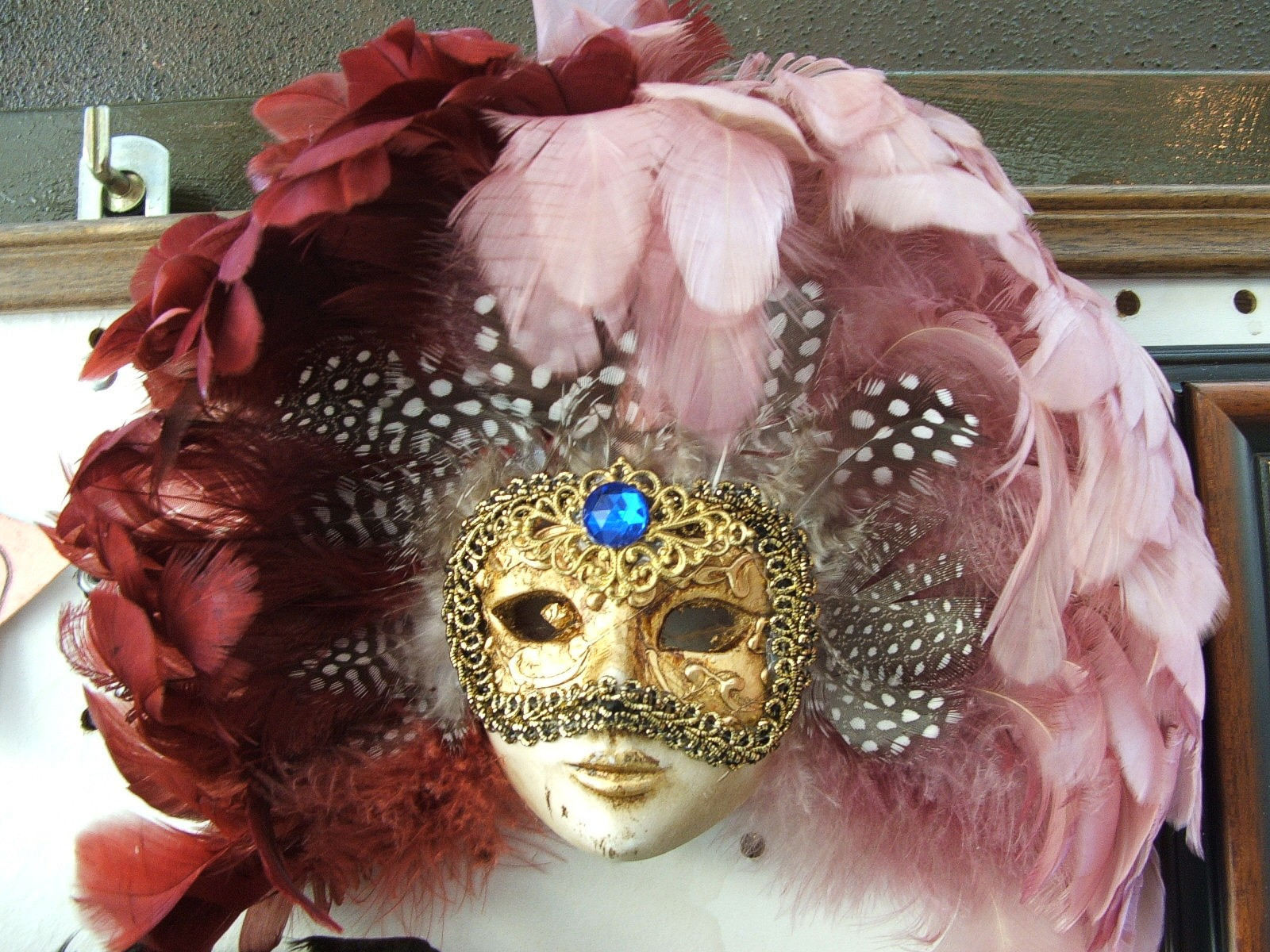
A Veneziana mask from Verona, Italy.

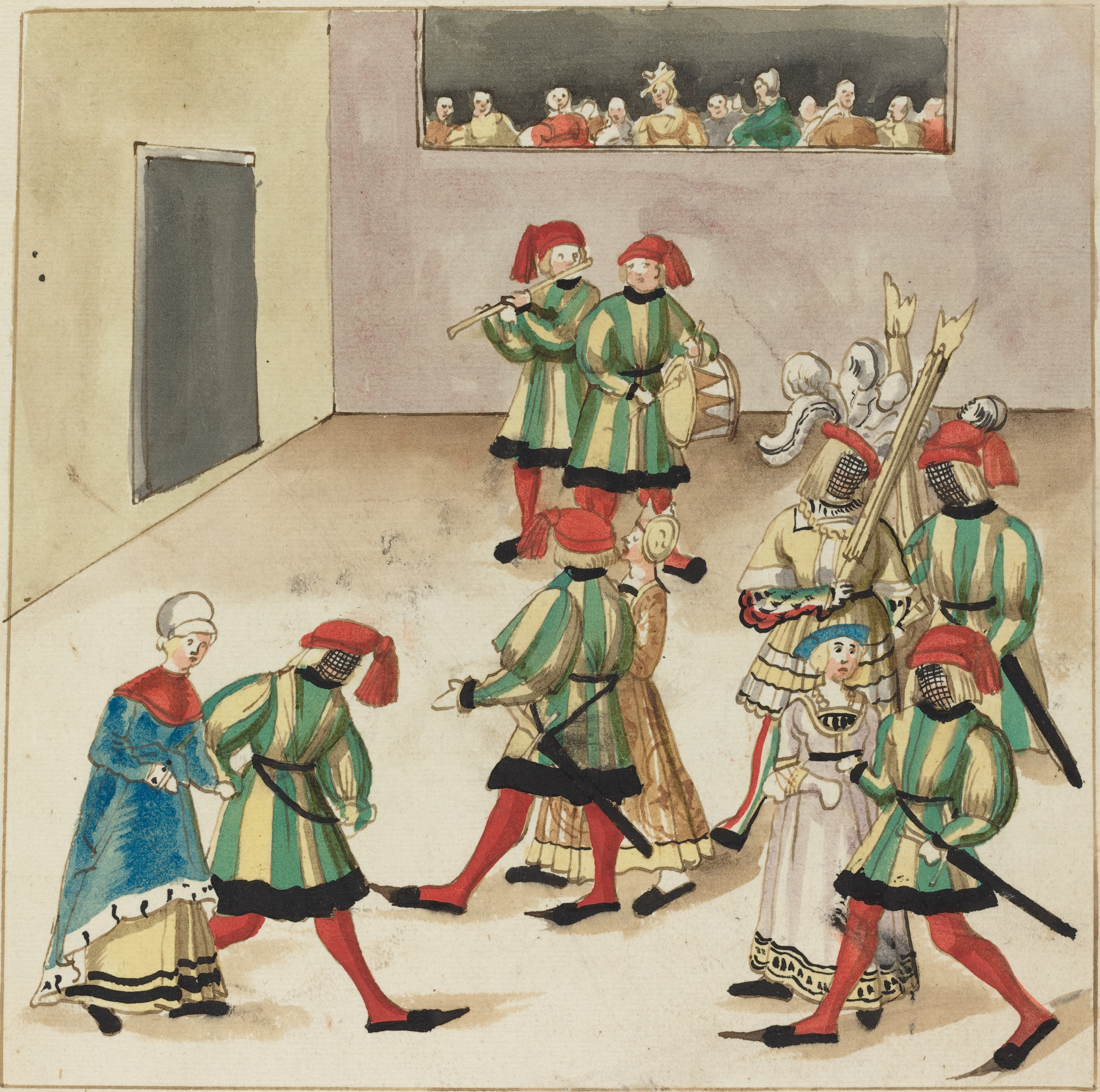
German 16th century, a masquerade from Freydal, the tournament book of Maximilian I, c. 1515, pen and brown ink with watercolor on laid paper. One in a series at the National Gallery of Art, Washington, Rosenwald Collection.

A masquerade ball (or bal masqué) is a special kind of formal ball which many participants attend in costume wearing masks. (Compare the word "masque"—a formal written and sung court pageant.) Less formal "costume parties" may be a descendant of this tradition. A masquerade ball usually encompasses music and dancing. These nighttime events are used for entertainment and celebrations.

== History ==
Masquerade balls were a feature of the Carnival season in the 15th century, and involved increasingly elaborate allegorical Royal Entries, pageants, and triumphal processions celebrating marriages and other dynastic events of late medieval court life. The "Bal des Ardents" ("Burning Men's Ball") was held by Charles VI of France, and intended as a Bal des sauvages ("Wild Men's Ball"), a form of costumed ball (morisco). It took place in celebration of the marriage of a lady-in-waiting of Charles VI of France's queen in Paris on January 28, 1393. The King and five courtiers dressed as wildmen of the woods (woodwoses), with costumes of flax and pitch. If they came too close to a torch, the dancers would catch fire. (This episode may have influenced Edgar Allan Poe's short story "Hop-Frog".) Such costumed dances were a special luxury of the Ducal Court of Burgundy.

Masquerade balls were extended into costumed public festivities in Italy during the 16th century Renaissance (Italian maschera). They were generally elaborate dances held for members of the upper classes, and were particularly popular in Venice. They have been associated with the tradition of the Venetian Carnival. With the fall of the Venetian Republic at the end of the 18th century, the use and tradition of masks gradually began to decline, until they disappeared altogether.

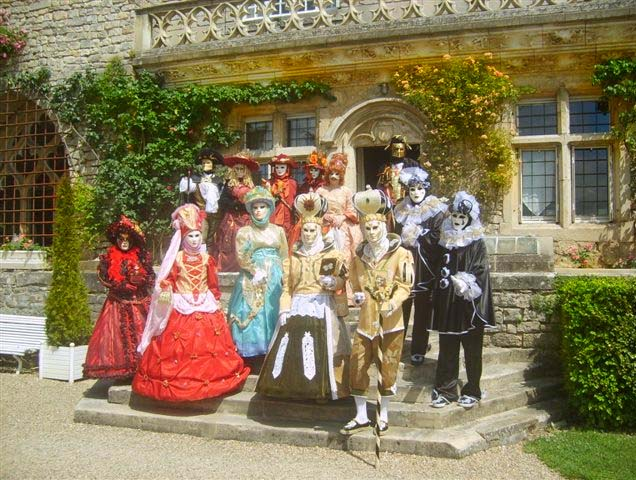
Masquerade ball at Château de Hattonchâtel, France.

They became popular throughout mainland Europe in the 17th and 18th centuries, sometimes with fatal results. In 1792 Gustav III of Sweden was assassinated at a masquerade ball by the disgruntled nobleman Jacob Johan Anckarström, an event which Eugène Scribe and Daniel Auber turned into the opera Gustave III. The same event was the basis of Giuseppe Verdi's opera A Masked Ball, although the censors in the original production forced him to portray it as a fictional story set in Boston. Also, the Masquerade Ball on Mardi Gras in 1778 at the Royal Opera of Versailles almost led to a serious duel within the Royal Family of France. Most masks came from countries like Switzerland and Italy.

A Swiss count who arrived in Italy in 1708, is credited with introducing to London the Venetian fashion of a semi-public masquerade ball, to which one might subscribe, with the first being held at Haymarket Opera House. London's public gardens, like Vauxhall Gardens, refurbished in 1732, and Ranelagh Gardens, provided optimal outdoor settings, where characters masked and in fancy dress mingled with the crowds. The reputation for unseemly behavior, unescorted women and assignations motivated a change of name, to the Venetian ridotto, but as "The Man of Taste" observed in 1733:

In Lent, if masquerades displease the town,
Call 'em Ridottos and they still go down.

A standard item of masquerade dress was a "Vandyke", improvised on the costumes worn in the portraits of Van Dyck: Gainsborough's Blue Boy is the most familiar example, and a reminder of the later 18th-century popularity in England for portraits in fancy dress.

Throughout the century, it is thought that masquerade dances became popular in Colonial America, however, portraits featured the subjects dressed as if they were attendees, but evidence is scant, according to Jennifer Van Horn, that colonials in North Americans actually had the events. Its prominence in England did not go unchallenged; a significant anti-masquerade movement grew alongside the balls themselves. The anti-masquerade writers (among them such notables as Samuel Richardson) held that the events encouraged immorality and "foreign influence". While they were sometimes able to persuade authorities to their views, particularly after the Lisbon earthquake of 1755, enforcement of measures designed to end masquerades was at best desultory, and the masquerades went on as semi-private "subscriptions". In the 1770s, fashionable Londoners went to the masquerades organized by Teresa Cornelys at Carlisle House in Soho Square, and later to the Pantheon.

Masquerade balls were sometimes set as a game among the guests. The masked guests were supposedly dressed so as to be unidentifiable. This would create a type of game to see if a guest could determine each other's identities. This added a humorous effect to many masquerades and enabled a more enjoyable version of typical balls.

One of the most noted masquerade balls of the 20th century was that held at Palazzo Labia in Venice on 3 September 1951, hosted by Carlos de Beistegui. It was dubbed "the party of the century".

Another famous ball was The Black and White Ball. It held on November 28, 1966, at the Plaza Hotel in New York City. Hosted by author Truman Capote, the ball was in honor of the Washington Post publisher Katharine Graham.

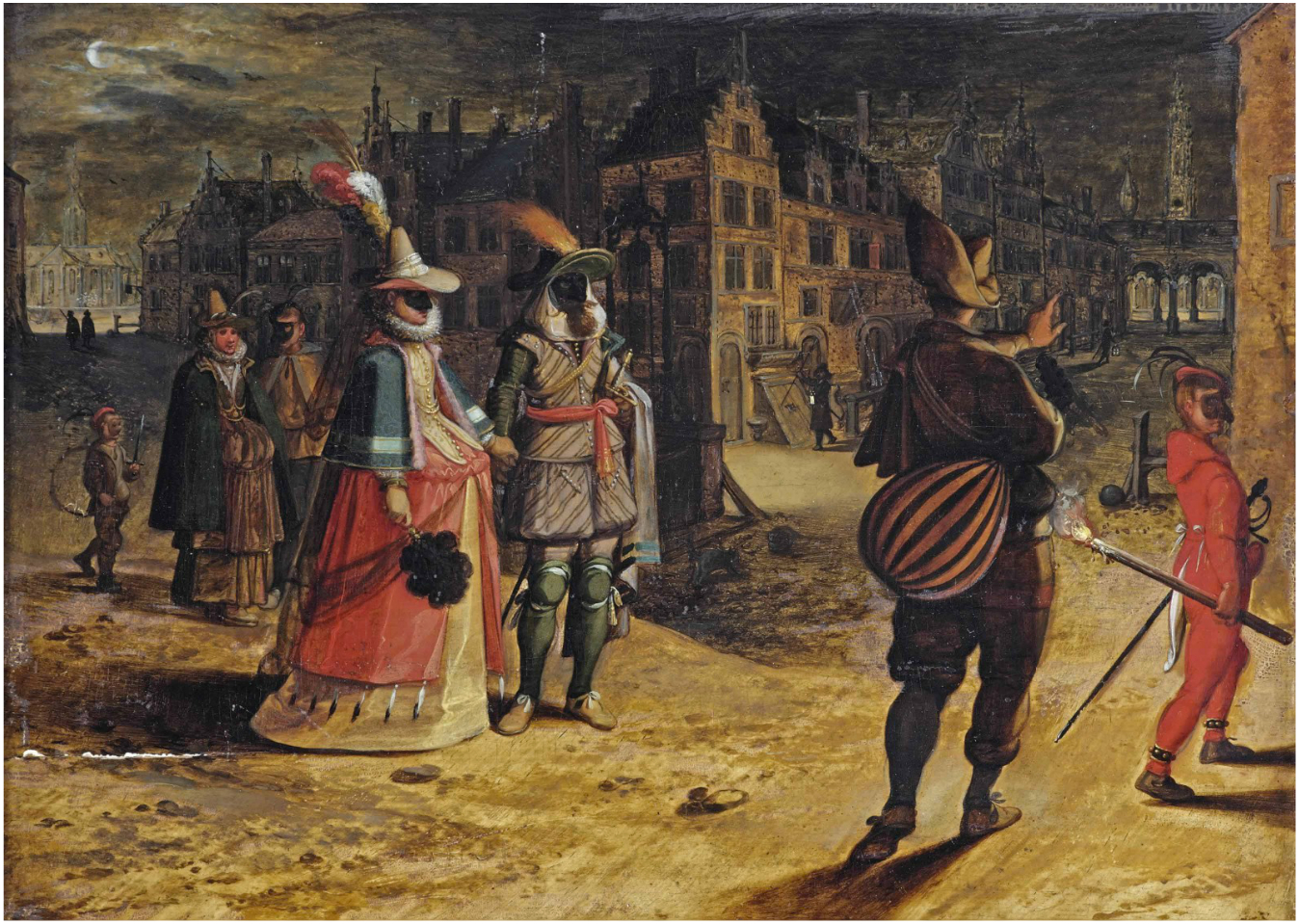
Circa 1600-1646. A view of Antwerp by night with elegant figures on their way to a masquerade

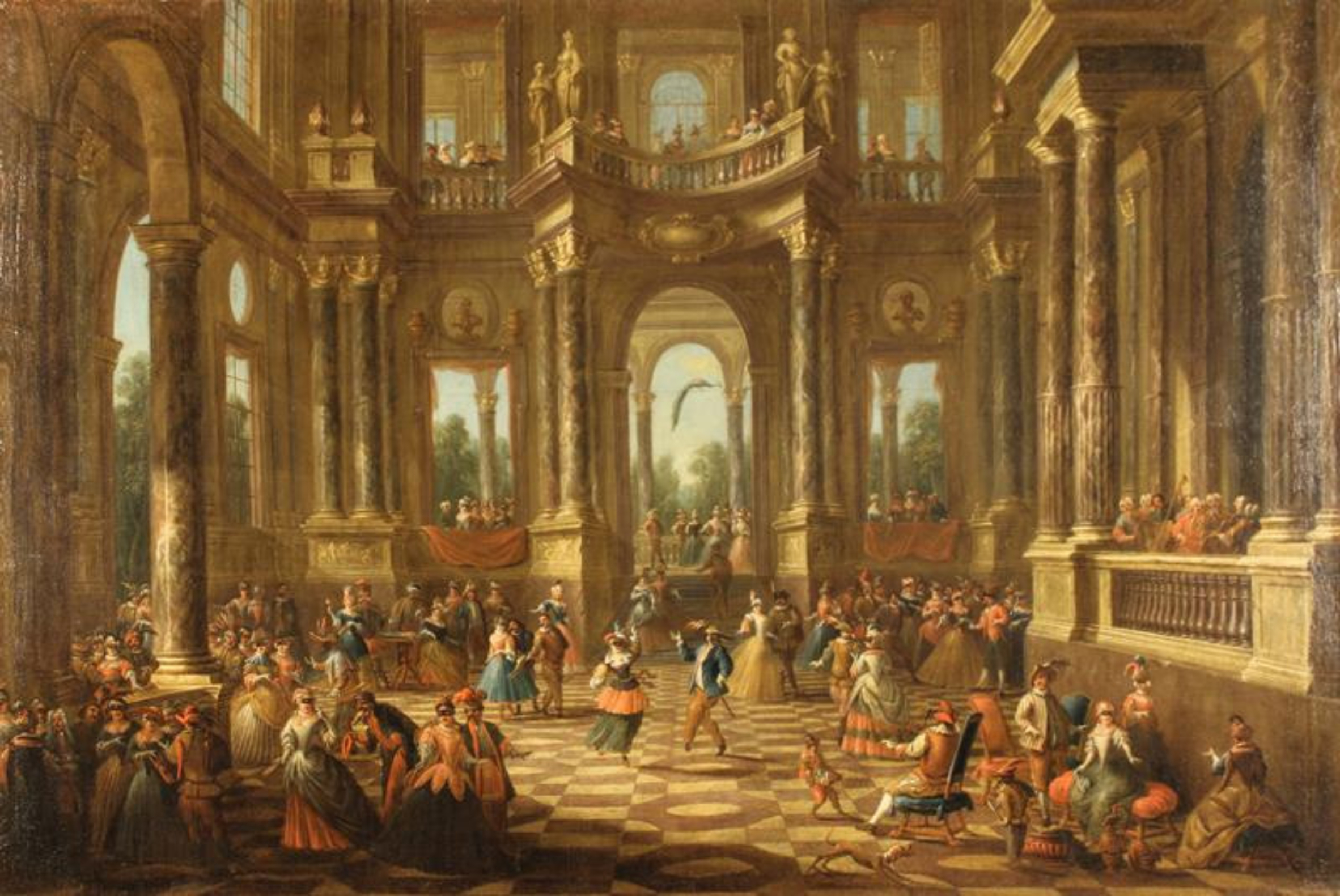
1740. Maquerade

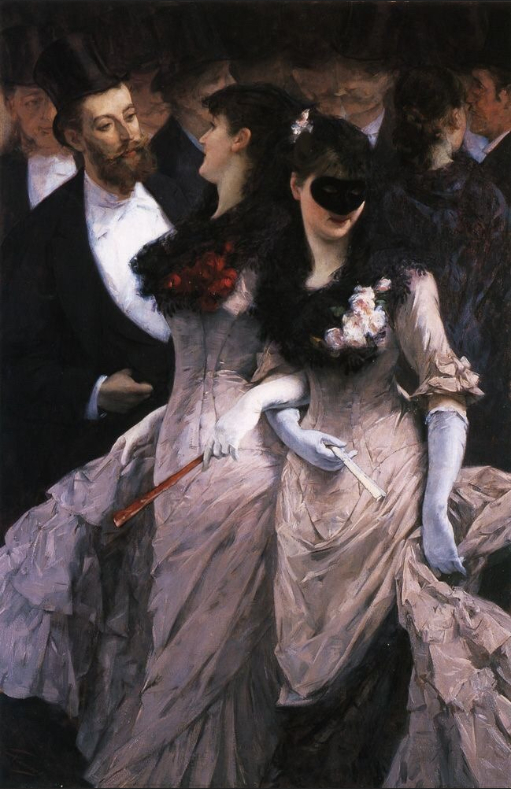
1880. Charles Hermans - At the masquerade

== Masks ==
Masquerade masks were worn delicately by the prosperous class at balls. Masquerade masks had many uses including hiding one's identity, and using different colour to express one's freedom of speech and voice one's emotions and opinions without judgement. There were two types of base masquerade masks; black masks and white masks. Designs and patterns were created over the base that was chosen. The main types of masks included masks with a stick (which one could hold to keep the mask in front of their face), the head mask, the full-face mask, and the half face mask. Masquerade masks have been used in classics such as The Phantom of the Opera, Romeo and Juliet, Lone Ranger, and Gossip Girl. They are still used in many types of media today.

== Contemporary era ==
=== In French Guiana ===
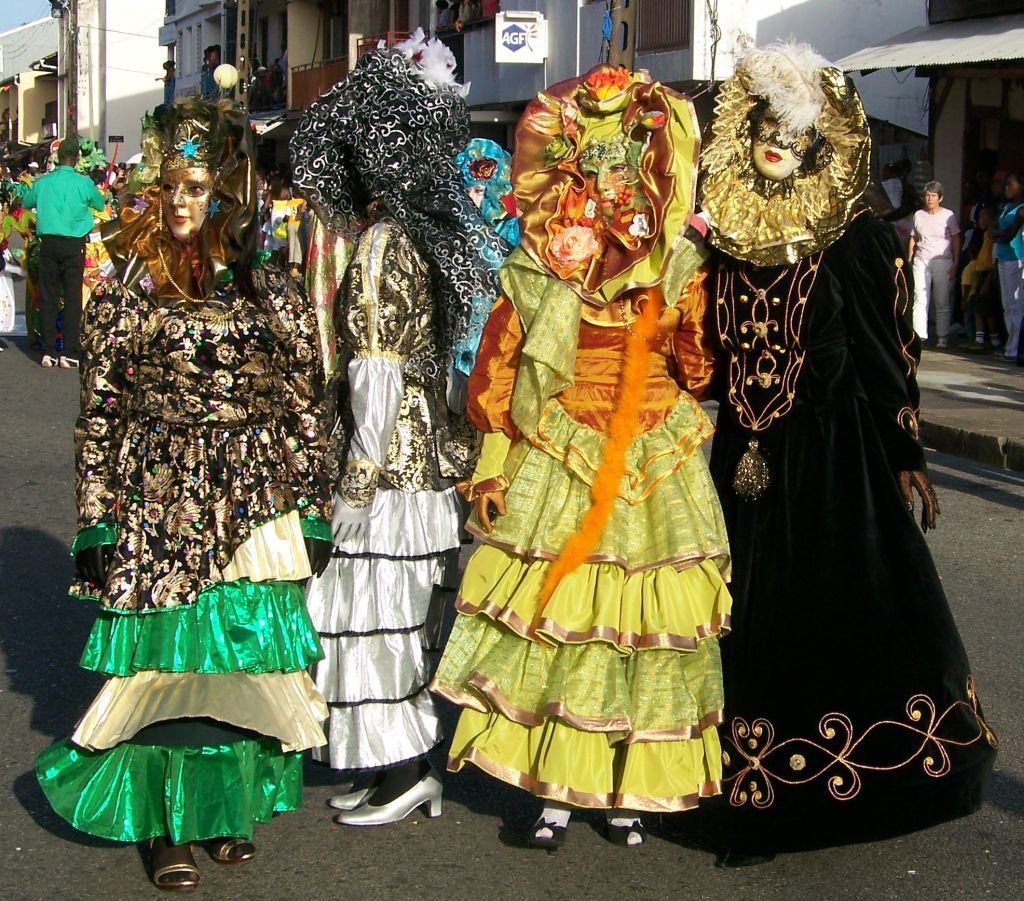
Touloulous in the Cayenne streets in 2007.

In French Guiana, throughout the Carnival period, masked balls (known as paré-masked balls) take place every weekend. These are called Touloulous balls, where the Touloulous (women) are completely disguised and unrecognizable. Recently the Tololos (men) have also taken to wearing disguises.

=== In North America ===
Masquerade balls continue to be a part of Mardi Gras in the United States, notably Mardi Gras in Mobile, Alabama (organized by mystic societies) and Mardi Gras in New Orleans (organized by krewes).

A new resurgence of masquerade balls began in the late 1990s in North America. More recently, the party atmosphere is emphasized and the formal dancing usually less prominent. In present times, masquerade masks are used for costumes during Halloween. Masquerade masks are sold in a wide range of stores in different designs, and colors.

== Cultural references ==
The picturesque quality of the masquerade ball has made it a favorite topic or setting in literature.

- Edgar Allan Poe's short story "The Masque of the Red Death" is based at a masquerade ball in which a central figure turns out to be his costume.
- A ball in Zürich is featured in the novel Steppenwolf by Hermann Hesse.
- A masquerade ball is central to the plot of Mikhail Lermontov's 1835 play Masquerade. The play was censored and never staged during Lermontov's lifetime, partly because of the implied criticism of the masquerade balls staged by the aristocratic Engelhardt family.
- The book, musical and most film adaptations of The Phantom of the Opera have a scene at a masked ball. The Phantom's (Erik's) costume is that of the Red Death from the aforementioned Edgar Allan Poe story The Masque of the Red Death.
- In the play Romeo and Juliet by William Shakespeare, Romeo meets Juliet at a masquerade ball.
- The video game Dishonored has a mission called Lady Boyle's Last Party, taking place at a masquerade where the primary objective is discerning the identity of Lady Boyle, a masked party-goer.
- The video game Assassin's Creed II has a series of missions called Carnevale set during Venetian Carnival where the primary objective is to gain access to one of the more prestigious masquerade balls, ending in the mission which primarily takes place in the masquerade ball.
- The video game The Witcher 3: Wild Hunt features a mission set at a masquerade ball, on the Vegelbud estate, where the primary objective is to find the owner's son who is wearing a panther mask.
- The video game Dead by Daylight celebrated its sixth to ninth anniversaries with a masquerade ball themed limited time in-game event known as the Twisted Masquerade.
- In Stanley Kubrick's erotic drama Eyes Wide Shut, protagonist Bill Harford's life is upturned by a chain of events as he secretly treads into a orgiastic masquerade ball.
