= Gaetano Guadagni =

Italian castrato (1728–1792)

Gaetano Guadagni, by Antonio Fedi

Cosimo Gaetano Guadagni (16 February 1728 – 11 November 1792) was an Italian contralto castrato singer, most famous for singing the role of Orpheus at the premiere of Gluck's opera Orfeo ed Euridice in 1762.

== Career ==
Born at Lodi, Lombardy, Guadagni joined the cappella of Sant'Antonio in Padua in 1746, but also made his public operatic debut at Venice that year, which was not met with ecclesiastical approval: he was dismissed from his position in Padua by 1748, and soon after appeared in London as a member of Giovanni Francesco Crosa ("Dr Croza")'s buffo (comic) company. He does not appear to have had the typical rigorous training that most castrati undertook, which may account for his being described by the music historian Charles Burney as a "wild and careless singer" on Guadagni's arrival in England. He was rapidly taken up in theatrical and musical circles in the capital, and also acquired a reputation for his sexual activities, as did many castrati. This was reported by Horace Walpole in a letter to Horace Mann dated 23 March 1749:

Delaval, a wild young fellow, kept an Italian woman, called the Tedeschi. He had notice one day that she was actually then in bed with Guadagni, a handsome young eunuch, who sings in the burlettas. The injured cavalier takes one of his chairmen and a horsewhip, surprises the lovers, drags them out of bed, and makes the chairman hold Mars, while he flogged Venus most unmercifully. After that execution, he takes Guadagni, who fell on his knees and cried and screamed for mercy – "No, Sir", said Delaval, "I have another sort of punishment for you", and immediately turned up that part, which in England is accustomed indeed to be flogged too, but in its own country has a different entertainment – which he accordingly gave it.

For performances in 1750 Handel rewrote three arias in Messiah for him, the first, "But who may abide", being particularly adapted to a castrato's bravura technique (which he clearly had acquired by this date). Handel had previously set this text as recitative, and then as a comparatively gentle minuet in triple time throughout. Both of these were for bass voice: for Guadagni, as well as transposing the first section up an octave, Handel wrote a new, virtuosic setting of the text "For he is like a refiner's fire", especially exploiting the singer's fine low notes. Guadagni also took part in revivals of Samson (for which Handel reworked a part originally written for Susannah Cibber), Judas Maccabeus, Belshazzar and Esther. The one role that Guadagni actually created for Handel was Didymus in Theodora. Where Messiah had exploited his virtuosity in rapid passage work, this new role gave him, at the beginning of the aria "The raptur'd soul", a fine opportunity to display his "artful manner of diminishing his voice like the dying notes of an Aeolian harp", as Burney described it. Burney also claimed to have helped Guadagni with his English, saying that, "during his first residence in London he was more noticed in singing English than Italian". In 1755, he was engaged by David Garrick to sing in an English opera The Fairies by Handel's sometime amanuensis, John Christopher Smith, and the famous actor, again according to Burney, "took much pleasure in forming him". At this time his voice was described by Burney as a "full and well-toned countertenor (here meaning that his range matched that of the contemporary English voice of that name; however, the historian was mistaken in his perception that Guadagni's voice changed from alto to soprano in later life). Burney also remarked on unusual details in the manner of Guadagni's performance: "attitudes, action and impassioned and exquisite manner of singing the simple and ballad-like air 'Che farò senza Euridice?' [in Gluck's Orfeo ed Euridice, see below], acquired his very great and just applause".

In Italy he had further great success in the years 1756 to 1761, being admired as much for his singing as his acting, though was often in trouble with impresarios: "he rarely does his duty" was the complaint, probably meaning that he would not curry favour with audiences, neither bowing to acknowledge applause, nor being willing to repeat arias. In his desire thus to maintain dramatic unity, he was an ideal interpreter for the role of Orpheus in Gluck's Orfeo ed Euridice, which he premiered in Vienna on 5 October 1762. This opera, to a libretto by Calzabigi, marked the start of Gluck's reforms of opera seria, in which the composer moved away from the more usual type of serious Italian opera then current, epitomised by the operas of composers like Vivaldi and Hasse in their settings of the libretti of Metastasio. Guadagni sang in other "reform operas": Orestes in Traetta's Ifigenia in Tauride (1763), and the title role in another of Gluck's operas, Telemaco (1765). He also continued to sing in Metastasian roles by composers such as Jommelli and Gassmann, and by Gluck himself. By 1767, his expressive, yet inherently simple style was finding much less favour with opera-goers than the more typical florid singing of his contemporaries.

In the summer of 1769, he made his last visit to London, and became embroiled in the financial problems involving his impresario, the Honourable George Hobart, manager of the King's Theatre, Haymarket, who also offended the singer by hiring one Zamperina (his then mistress) in preference to Guadagni's own sister. Eventually Guadagni left the company there, and took part in unlicensed performances of Mattia Vento's Artaserse, sponsored by the former singer Teresa Cornelys at her home, Carlisle House, in Soho Square: for these he was fined £50, and threatened with Bridewell Prison, and maybe another whipping. His performances in London in the season of 1770–71 included a pasticcio version of Gluck's Orfeo, with additional music by Johann Christian Bach, Pietro Antonio Guglielmi, and one aria arranged by Guadagni himself.

By 1773, the singer had fallen in with the blue-stocking Maria Antonia of Bavaria, Dowager Electress of Saxony, and had followed her to Munich. Here Burney encountered him again, and reports fascinatingly on his ability to sing perfectly in tune: so exact was his intonation in duets with his fellow castrato Venanzio Rauzzini that their singing generated "difference tones". He sang further settings of the Orpheus story by Antonio Tozzi (1775) and Ferdinando Bertoni (1776), the former to a new libretto in three acts by Marco Coltellini, an admirer of Calzabigi, the latter to the 1762 one-act libretto by Calzabigi himself. Bertoni's setting, sometimes accused of plagiarism from Gluck's, enjoyed considerable popularity on the stage in the last quarter of the 18th century, often initially with Guadagni in the male lead.

== Retirement ==
Guadagni retired to Padua, where he became something of an institution, renowned for his prodigal generosity: during his career he had amassed a large fortune, and he now built himself a splendid house in the city. Having rejoined the cappella of the church of San Antonio in 1768, he remained a member until his death, at an annual salary of four hundred ducats. For this, as Burney remarked, he was "required to attend only at the four principal festivals". His last operatic role was Deucalion in Deucalione e Pirra by Antonio Calegari (1781). Lord Mount Edgcumbe heard him in 1784: "I had the good fortune to hear a motetto, or anthem, sung by Guadagni ... He was now advanced in years ... his voice was still full and well toned, and his style appeared to me excellent." By this time, Guadagni had become fond of singing Orfeo behind the scenes, with the action represented by puppets.

Sometime between 1785 and 1787 he suffered a stroke that rendered him incapable of speech, and for some time severely affected his ability to sing. His return to some public notice was an emotional occasion: "... at mass, the musico Guadagni came to sing from devotion, and without payment ... this was about eight months after his attack, but he also wished to sing; and he sang the versetto 'Qui tollis peccata mundi' in the Gloria to the great admiration of the public, who applauded him."
