= George Child Villiers, 5th Earl of Jersey =

British courtier and Conservative politician

The Right Honourable The Earl of Jersey GCH PC
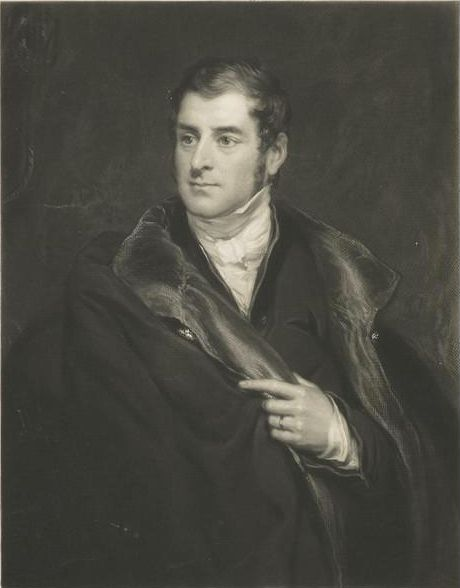
- Child Villiers, in 1836

Lord Chamberlain of the Household
- In office 24 July 1830 – 24 November 1830
- Monarch: William IV
- Prime Minister: The Duke of Wellington
- Preceded by: The Duke of Montrose
- Succeeded by: The Duke of Devonshire
- In office 15 December 1834 – 8 April 1835
- Monarch: William IV
- Prime Minister: Sir Robert Peel, Bt
- Preceded by: The Duke of Devonshire
- Succeeded by: The Marquess Wellesley

Master of the Horse
- In office 4 September 1841 – 29 June 1846
- Monarch: Victoria
- Prime Minister: Sir Robert Peel, Bt
- Preceded by: The Earl of Albemarle
- Succeeded by: The Duke of Norfolk
- In office 1 March 1852 – 17 December 1852
- Monarch: Victoria
- Prime Minister: The Earl of Derby
- Preceded by: The Duke of Norfolk
- Succeeded by: The Duke of Wellington

Personal details
- Born: 19 August 1773
- Died: 3 October 1859 (aged 86)
- Party: Conservative
- Spouse: Lady Sarah Fane (m. 1804)
- Children: 7, including George, Frederick, Francis, and Sarah
- Parent(s): George Villiers, 4th Earl of Jersey; Frances Twysden
- Education: St John's College, Cambridge

George Child Villiers, 5th Earl of Jersey, GCH, PC (19 August 1773 – 3 October 1859), previously George Villiers and styled Viscount Villiers until 1805, was a British courtier and Conservative politician from the Villiers family.

He added the name of Child to his own by royal licence in 1819.

== Background and education ==
Styled Viscount Villiers from birth, he was the son of George Villiers, 4th Earl of Jersey, by his wife Frances Twysden, daughter of the Right Reverend Philip Twysden, Bishop of Raphoe. He attended Harrow and obtained a Master of Arts degree from St John's College, Cambridge. He was a Gentleman of the Bedchamber to the Prince of Wales in 1795.

== Political career ==
Lord Jersey succeeded in the earldom on the death of his father in 1805 and took his seat in the House of Lords. He served as Lord Chamberlain of the Household under the Duke of Wellington between July and November 1830 and was sworn of the Privy Council in July 1830. He was Lord Chamberlain for a second time under Sir Robert Peel from 1834 to 1835. He again held office under Peel as Master of the Horse from 1841 to 1846, and again briefly under Lord Derby in 1852. He was awarded the honorary degree of Doctor of Civil Law by the University of Oxford.

== Family ==
Lord Jersey married Lady Sarah Sophia Fane, daughter of John Fane, 10th Earl of Westmorland, on 23 May 1804. She was the eldest grandchild and heiress of Robert Child, the principal shareholder of the banking firm Child & Co. Lord Jersey added the surname Child to the Villiers surname by royal licence in 1819.

Lady Jersey was one of the great hostesses of English society, a leader of the ton during the Regency era and the reign of George IV, and a patroness of Almack's. Lord Jersey was an ardent fox hunter and a breeder and trainer of horses, owning two Epsom Derby winners, in Mameluke (1827) and Bay Middleton (1836) as well as other notable thoroughbreds such as Glencoe. His wife's numerous love affairs did not trouble him: asked why he had never fought a duel to protect her honour, he replied that he could hardly fight every man in London. Lord and Lady Jersey had seven children:

- George Child Villiers, 6th Earl of Jersey (1808–1859), married Julia Peel, daughter of the Prime Minister, Sir Robert Peel, Bt.
- The Honourable Augustus John Villiers (1810–1847), married Georgiana Elphinstone (d. 1892), daughter of George Keith Elphinstone, 1st Viscount Keith, and Hester Maria ("Queeny") Thrale on 20 September 1831.
- The Honourable Frederick William Child Villiers (1815–1871), married Elizabeth Maria van Reede (18 December 1821 – 7 January 1897), daughter of the 7th Earl of Athlone on 12 July 1842. Member of Parliament for Weymouth between 1847 and 1852.
- The Honourable Francis John Robert Child Villiers (11 October 1819 – 8 May 1862). Member of Parliament for Rochester between 1852 and 1855.
- Lady Sarah Frederica Caroline Child Villiers (1822–1853), married Nicholas Paul (Miklós Pál), 9th Prince Esterhazy (1817–1894).
- Lady Clementina Augusta Wellington Child Villiers (1824–1858).
- Lady Adela Corisande Maria Child Villiers (1828–1860), married Lt.-Col. Charles Parke Ibbetson (1820–1898) on 17 November 1845 and had one daughter Adela Sarah Ibbetson.

Lord Jersey died on 3 October 1859, aged 86, and was succeeded by his eldest son, George, who died only weeks later. The Countess of Jersey died in January 1867, aged 81.

== Sources ==
- Maxwell, Herbert (1899). "Villiers, George Child-" . In Lee, Sidney (ed.). Dictionary of National Biography. Vol. 58. London: Smith, Elder & Co.

Political offices
Preceded by The Duke of Montrose	Lord Chamberlain; 1830	Succeeded by The Duke of Devonshire
Preceded by The Duke of Devonshire	Lord Chamberlain; 1834–1835	Succeeded by The Marquess Wellesley
Preceded by The Earl of Albemarle	Master of the Horse; 1841–1846	Succeeded by The Duke of Norfolk
Preceded by The Duke of Norfolk	Master of the Horse; 1852	Succeeded by The Duke of Wellington
Peerage of England
Preceded by George Villiers	Earl of Jersey; 1805–1859	Succeeded by George Child Villiers
