= Nikolaus III, Prince Esterházy =

Hungarian prince (1817–1894)

Nikolaus III
- Prince Esterházy
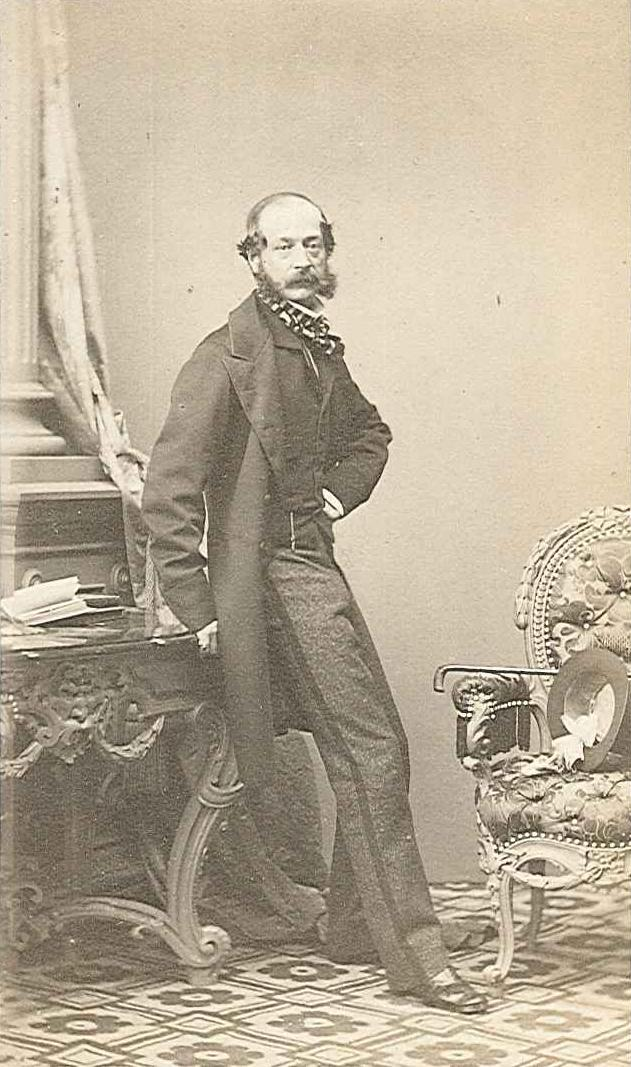

Prince Esterházy of Galántha
- Reign: 21 May 1866 – 28 January 1894
- Predecessor: Paul III Anton
- Successor: Paul IV
- Born: 25 June 1817; Regensburg, Kingdom of Bavaria
- Died: 28 January 1894 (aged 76); Vienna, Austria-Hungary
- Noble family: Esterházy
- Spouse: Lady Sarah Child-Villiers (m. 1842; died 1853)
- Issue: Prince Paul IV; Prince Aloys; Prince Anton
- Father: Paul III Anton
- Mother: Princess Maria Theresia of Thurn and Taxis

Nikolaus III, Prince Esterházy (Hungarian: Esterházy III. Miklós, German: Nikolaus III Esterházy (25 June 1817 – 28 January 1894) was the ninth prince of the Hungarian House of Esterházy.

== Life ==
Unlike his ancestors, Nikolaus did not spend his youth in the Schloss Esterháza in Hungary, but in England, where his father, Paul III Anton, Prince Esterházy, was Ambassador for the Austrian Emperor. Nikolaus married Lady Sarah Frederica Caroline Child-Villiers (1822–1853), a daughter of George Child Villiers, 5th Earl of Jersey, and his wife the former Lady Sarah Sophia Fane. Lady Jersey was a close friend of his mother Princess Maria Theresia of Thurn and Taxis, who served with her for many years as a patroness of Almack's, the centre of London's social scene. They had three sons, Paul IV, Prince Esterházy (born 1843), Aloys (1844), and Anton (1851). His wife died in 1853.

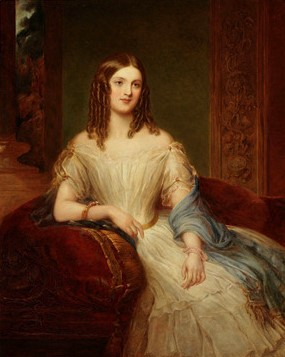
His wife, Lady Sarah Child-Villiers

After his return from England, Nikolaus entered into the service of the new Emperor Franz Joseph I of Austria, and accompanied him on his travels through Hungary and Transylvania. Like most of his ancestors, in 1862 he received the Order of the Golden Fleece.

In 1866, he succeeded his father, but under very difficult circumstances. In 1865 the Esterházy estates had been placed in the hands of curators until 1898, because of the enormous debts caused by his father's and grandfather's extravagance. Nikolaus was forced to sell the family's collection of paintings to the Kingdom of Hungary, and it still constitutes the core of the collection of the present-day Museum of Fine Arts in Budapest.

When he died in 1894 he was succeeded by his eldest son, Paul.

He owned 403,000 hectares of land.

== Ancestry ==
Ancestors of Nikolaus III, Prince Esterházy

16. Nikolaus I, Prince Esterházy
8. Anton I, Prince Esterházy
17. Countess Marie Elisabeth Ungnad of Weissenwolf
4. Nikolaus II, Prince Esterházy
18. Count Nikolaus Erdődy of Monyorókerék and Monoszló
9. Countess Maria Theresia Erdődy of Monyorókerék and Monoszló
19. Countess Maria Antonia Batthyány-Strattmann
2. Paul III Anton, Prince Esterházy
20. Prince Emanuel of Liechtenstein
10. Franz Joseph I, Prince of Liechtenstein
21. Countess Maria Anna Antonia of Dietrichstein-Weichselstädt, Baroness of Hollenburg and Finkenstein
5. Princess Maria Josepha Hermengilde of Liechtenstein
22. Count Franz Philipp of Sternberg
11. Countess Leopoldine of Sternberg
23. Countess Leopoldine of Starhemberg
1. Nikolaus III, Prince Esterházy
24. Alexander Ferdinand, 3rd Prince of Thurn and Taxis
12. Karl Anselm, 4th Prince of Thurn and Taxis
25. Margravine Sophie Christine of Brandenburg-Bayreuth
6. Karl Alexander, 5th Prince of Thurn and Taxis
26. Charles Alexander, Duke of Württemberg
13. Duchess Auguste of Württemberg
27. Princess Marie Auguste of Thurn and Taxis
3. Princess Maria Theresia of Thurn and Taxis
28. Duke Charles Louis Frederick of Mecklenburg
14. Charles II, Grand Duke of Mecklenburg-Strelitz
29. Princess Elisabeth Albertine of Saxe-Hildburghausen
7. Duchess Therese of Mecklenburg-Strelitz
30. Prince George William of Hesse-Darmstadt
15. Princess Friederike of Hesse-Darmstadt
31. Countess Maria Louise Albertine of Leiningen-Falkenburg-Dagsburg

== Sources ==
Nikolaus III, Prince Esterházy House of Esterházy Born: 25 June 1817 Died: 28 January 1894
Hungarian nobility
Preceded by Paul III Anton	Prince Esterházy of Galántha; 21 May 1866 – 28 January 1894	Succeeded by Paul IV
