= Almack's =

Social clubs in 18th-20th century London

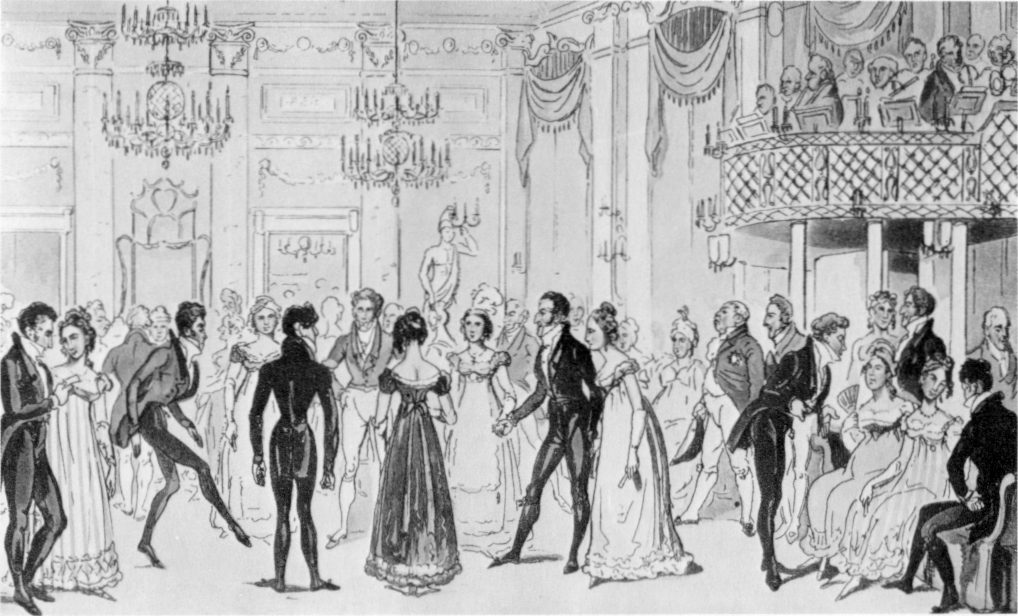
London's high society at Almack's

Almack's was the name of a number of establishments and social clubs in London between the 18th and 20th centuries. Two of the social clubs would go on to fame as Brooks's and Boodle's. Almack's most famous establishment was based in assembly rooms on King Street, St James's, and was one of a limited number of upper-class mixed-sex public social venues in the British capital in an era when the most important venues for the hectic social season were the grand houses of the aristocracy. The site of the club, Almack's Assembly Rooms or (from 1781) Willis's Rooms, has become retrospectively interchangeable with the club, though for much of the club's lifetime, the rooms offered a variety of other entertainments with no connection to the club.

== William Almack ==
The history of Almack's begins with its founder William Almack (the elder). One popular theory, circulated since 1811, supposes him to have been Scottish, his real name 'M'Caul', and that he had changed it because he found that in England a Scots name prejudiced his business. In fact, Almack appears to have been of Yorkshire origin, and the theory that this was an assumed name is undoubtedly false. In the will of his brother John Almack (died 1762) there is a legacy to his married sister, Ann Tebb, who lived at Sand Hutton in the parish of Thirsk, Yorkshire; and William Almack later bequeathed an annuity of twenty pounds to his niece Ann Tebb. The parish registers of Thirsk show that the Almack family had been established there since 1629. However, William Almack's wife, Elizabeth Cullen, was Scottish, and Almack himself may have met her whilst they were both in the service of the Duke of Hamilton, Almack as valet to the Duke and Elizabeth as waiting-maid to the Duchess. These Scottish associations may have led to the presumption that Almack himself was a Scot.

From 1754 to 1759 William Almack kept a licensed coffee house in Curzon Street, open to all comers. On 7 September 1759 he obtained a licence 'to keep a common Alehouse or Victualling-house' at No. 49 Pall Mall and the rate books confirm that this tavern, which stood on the north side of Pall Mall, was opened by Almack in the latter part of 1759. Between September 1759 and January 1762 this establishment appears to have been an ordinary licensed house open to all comers. A letter from Horace Walpole to the Hon. Henry Seymour Conway, dated 10 April 1761, contains one of the few contemporary references to Almack at this period, and indicates that he was already known for the dinners for which he and Edward Boodle later became famous: 'Poor Sir Harry Ballendene is dead; he made a great dinner at Almack's for the house of Drummond, drank very hard, caught a violent fever, and died in a very few days.'

== The First Almack's Club, Brooks's, and Boodle's ==
In January 1762 a private 'Society' was established in the house (No. 50) adjoining the tavern; this was the first of Almack's clubs, and was the immediate precursor of two of the greatest clubs in St. James's Street, Brooks's and Boodle's.

The record book of the new society was kept by Almack as a statement of the terms on which he agreed to provide for the social needs of the members, and it has survived amongst the records of Boodle's. The first entry, dated 1 January 1762, states that 'William Almack has taken the large new House West of his now dwelling House in Pall Mall for the sole use of a Society Established upon the following Rules': Until 10 February 1762, membership was to be open to anyone signing his name in the book. Thereafter, election was to be by ballot, which was always to be held 'in Parliament Time', i.e., when Parliament was in session, and one black ball (vote against admission) was sufficient to exclude a proposed candidate; the total membership was to be limited to 250. After 10 February the members were to appoint thirteen managers, 'each of whom are to have a power to keep order and make the Rules of the Society to be observed'; they were to serve for one year, after which each manager was 'to appoint a Successor for the ensuing Year'. The rules of the society could be changed only by the unanimous vote of at least thirty members. The annual subscription was to be two guineas, to be paid 'to Almack for the House'. Almack was to take in all the London and some foreign newspapers; dinner (at eight shillings) was 'to be allways upon the Table' at a quarter past four o'clock and supper (at six shillings) at 'a Quarter before Eleven'; a bottle of port cost half a crown. Almack was to order the food 'without any directions from any body', and members might 'speak for any Dish, cheap or Dear', but the prices were not to exceed those at the Smyrna coffee house. Members' friends could only be entertained in the first room facing the street on the ground floor, where they could have 'tea, coffee or chocolate, but no Meat or Wine nor can there be any Gaming or Cards in that Room'. Gambling amongst the members was to be limited to a maximum of nine guineas per rubber or session. This new club appears to have been formed in opposition, perhaps for political reasons, to White's (then often called Arthur's), for rule 12 as originally drafted forbade any member of Almack's from membership of any other London club, 'nor of what is at present called Arthur's or by whatever Name that Society or Club may be afterwards called, neither of new or old club or any other belonging to it'. In February 1763 this rule was altered and made even more emphatic: 'If any Member of this Society becomes a Member of Arthur's or a Candidate for Arthur's, he is of Course struck out of this Society.'

Eighty-eight gentlemen, none of whom appears to have been a member of White's, paid subscriptions for 1762, and the appointment of thirteen managers for the period February 1763 to February 1764 is recorded.

In March 1764 this club appears to have been superseded by or to have divided itself into two separate societies. The reason for this rearrangement is not known, but it may have been connected with members' differing political affiliations, or with the desire of some of them to gamble more heavily than the rules of 1762 permitted. So far as Almack himself was concerned, the change was clearly an important one, for in the autumn of 1764 he did not renew his tavern licence, and in August, The Gentleman's Magazine reported that 'Almack's is no longer to be used as a public tavern but is to be set apart for the reception of a set of gentlemen, who are to meet after the manner of the minority at Wildman's. These societies, 'tis believed, will endeavour to distinguish themselves by their zeal for the public good.'

One of these two societies would go on to become Brooks's. Until 1778 it met in Almack's former tavern (No. 49) in Pall Mall. During the whole of this period, Almack was the proprietor, the subscriptions were paid to him and the club was known as Almack's. But from 1771 to 1778 the rates for the house were paid by 'Brooks and Ellis', who were presumably Almack's employees or perhaps partners and who were responsible for the day-to-day running of the club. There were twenty-seven foundation members of this club, and a further 141 were elected by ballot in 1764. The original rules of 1764 forbade membership of any other London club except 'old' White's, but this rule was quickly repealed, certainly before 1772. Heavy gambling immediately became prevalent and in 1770 Horace Walpole commented that 'the gaming at Almack's which has taken the pas of White's, is worthy the decline of our Empire, or Commonwealth. . . . The young men of the age lose five, ten, fifteen thousand pounds in an evening there.' At the age of sixteen Charles James Fox was elected a member in 1765 and much of his reckless gambling and betting took place at Almack's. Edward Gibbon became a member in 1776 and in a letter of that year he describes the use which he made of the club: 'Town grows empty and this house, where I have passed very agreable [sic] hours, is the only place which still unites the flower of the English youth. The style of living though somewhat expensive is exceedingly pleasant and notwithstanding the rage of play I have found more entertaining and even rational society here than in any other Club to which I belong.' In September 1777 Brooks acquired from Henry Holland the younger a site on the corner of Park Place and St. James's Street and opened his club there in October 1778. In a letter of September 1778, James Hare says: 'Brookes is to open his house in St. James's Street next month, it is to consist of as many of the present members of Almack's as choose to put their names down'; and in the following month 'Brooks opens his house in St. James's Street this month. He invites all or as many as please to come from the Club in Pall [Mall], and Almack desires us to stay with him, but as there can be no reason for preferring a bad old house to a good new one, I imagine Brookes will be victorious.' This prophecy was fulfilled, for there are no references to Almack's club in Pall Mall after 1778. The new club in Pall Mall is to this day known by Brooks's name.

The house in Pall Mall (No. 49) vacated by Brooks in 1778 was occupied from 1779 to 1786 by James Carr, and from 1787 to 1790 it was occupied by Thomas Nelson and (for part of this period) Peter Wilder, who were sub-tenants of William Almack's widow and son. In 1790 the house was described as 'Almack's Hotel'. From 1796 until the early 1820s it was occupied by the firm of Ransom and Morland, and from 1822 to 1832 by the Travellers Club. From 1841 to 1845 part of the house was occupied by the London Library. The freehold of the house had been acquired in 1785 by William Almack's son, and it subsequently passed to Elizabeth Pitcairn, William Almack's daughter. By her will (proved 1844) she bequeathed the house to her nephew, the Rev. Augustus Campbell, Rector of Liverpool, who died in 1870. The house was sold by the latter's trustees in 1894 and it was demolished shortly afterwards.

Next door to the Proto-Brooks Club at No.50 was the predecessor of another London club, Boodle's. Edward Boodle is known to have been in partnership with William Almack, probably between 1764 and 1768. The present Boodle's Club in St. James's Street possesses two manuscript books, each containing a list of rules and names of subscribers, each virtually identical to each other, indicating Boodle to have taken over management of this society from 1764. The rules in Boodle's books are based on those contained in Almack's book dated 1 January 1762, and many of them are copied verbatim. This similarity makes it clear that Boodle's club was either a continuation or an off-shoot under new management and slightly altered rules of the club which Almack had established in January 1762. It met in the house which the latter had occupied from January 1762 to February 1764, i.e., No. 50 Pall Mall, next door to the house (No. 49) which from 1759 to 1764 was Almack's tavern and from 1764 to 1778 housed Almack's club, before its removal under William Brooks to St. James's Street.

The partnership between Almack and Boodle probably came to an end in 1768, for in that year Boodle succeeded Almack as the ratepayer for No. 50, and in March 1768 Boodle is known to have held a sub-lease of the house from Almack. Contemporary references to the club become much more frequent. Edward Gibbon first mentions Boodle's in a letter of 18 April 1768, and he subsequently became a member of the club; starting in December 1769 he wrote much of his correspondence there, and in 1770 he was one of the managers.

Boodle died on 8 February 1772, and on 13 February it was unanimously resolved that 'Ben Harding shall succeed the late Mr. Boodle in the House and Business, and shall be supported therein'. On 22 February the residue of Edward Boodle's lease from Almack was reassigned to Harding. In spite of the change of proprietor the club continued to be known as Boodle's. It left No. 50 in 1783, following which the house was occupied by Messrs. Hammersley and Co. for a number of years, and was subsequently demolished.

The Macaroni Club appears to have been based at Almack's No. 49 premises between 1764 and 1773.

== The Ladies' Club or Female Coterie ==
From 1769 to 1771 Almack provided accommodation for a club composed of members of both sexes. The club, known as The Female Coterie, first met on 17 December 1769 and soon attracted a great deal of attention. On 6 May 1770 Horace Walpole recorded that "There is a new institution that begins to make, and if it proceeds, will make a considerable noise. It is a club of both sexes to be erected at Almack's, on the model of that of the men of White's. Mrs. Fitzroy, Lady Pembroke, Mrs. Meynell, Lady Molyneux, Miss Pelham, and Miss Lloyd, are the foundresses. I am ashamed to say I am of so young and fashionable a society; but as they are people I live with, I choose to be idle rather than morose. I can go to a young supper without forgetting how much sand is run out of the hour-glass." The most important rules were that all members were admitted by ballot and 'the ladies shall ballot for men, and men for ladies'; thus 'no lady can exclude a lady, or gentleman a gentleman'. The subscription was five guineas; dinner was to be on the table at half past four in the afternoon, price eight shillings "exclusive of the wine, which the men are to pay". Members met "every morning, either to play cards, chat, or do whatever else they please. An ordinary is provided for as many as choose to dine, and supper to be constantly on the table by eleven at night; after supper, they play loo..."

By September 1770 this very exclusive club possessed 123 members, including five dukes. It is not certain in which of Almack's two houses in Pall Mall it met; Mrs. Elizabeth Harris placed it at Boodle's (No. 50) but an undated letter of the Hon. Mrs. Boscawen says that it met 'for the present, at certain rooms of Almack's, who for another year is to provide a private house...' By December 1771 it had moved to Albemarle Street; it remained there under the management of Robert Sutton until 1775, when it moved to Arlington Street under the management of James Cullen. The last meeting of the club was held on 4 December 1777. Cullen was left heavily in debt and the Chancery suit which he subsequently brought against certain members contains valuable information about the way in which such shortlived proprietary clubs were managed.

== The Assembly Rooms at King Street ==
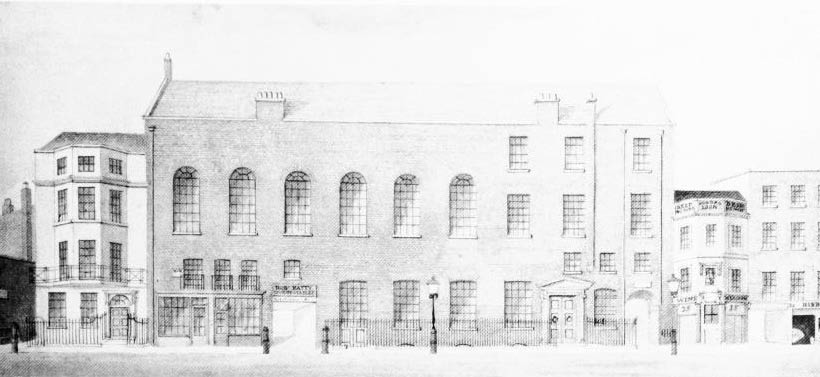
The building was unpretentious.

Following the success of William Almack's establishment at No. 49 & 50 Pall Mall, he began to engage in further speculation in the field of fashionable amusement. In September 1764 and March 1765 he was granted leases of four small houses on the south side of King Street. Two of these houses were on the west side of Rose and Crown Yard and two were on the east; their total frontage, including the entrance to the mews, was some seventy-three feet. He also acquired the lease of the stables and coach-houses on the west side of the mews. Finally, on 25 September 1765 John Phillips, carpenter, granted him a 993-year lease of the ground to the west of these houses; this plot had a frontage of some sixty feet, and abutted King's Place (now Pall Mall Place) on the west side. The assembly rooms were erected on the site between May 1764 and February 1765; the architect was Robert Mylne, who also advised Almack on the 'bargain' which the latter struck with his aristocratic patrons.

On 5 April 1764 Mrs. Elizabeth Harris wrote to her son (later the first Earl of Malmesbury) that 'Almack is going to build some most magnificent rooms behind his house [in Pall Mall], one much larger than that at Carlisle House' in Soho Square. On 30 May Mylne wrote in his diary 'Attended Mr. James and Crewe for Club in Kings Street. Attended Mr. Almack on bargain between him and club in Kings Street.' Mr. James was perhaps Haughton James, a West India proprietor and a member of Brooks's from 1764 to 1813. Crewe was probably John Crewe, member of Parliament for many years after 1765 and a member of Brooks's from 1764 until his death in 1829; he was created Baron Crewe in 1806.

On 30 September Mylne noted 'Gave a plan of Assembly Rooms in King Street for Duke of York to Mr. Almack.' On 14 November Mylne 'wrote an advert, for Mr. Almack' which was inserted by the latter in The Public Advertiser on the following day. It was addressed to 'the Ladies and Gentlemen, Subscribers to the Assembly in King street St. James's,' whom it informed that 'the Building already erected, and now finishing for the Purposes of your Meeting, is in such Forwardness, that every Thing will be done by the Time proposed; and that at any Rate, there will be more than sufficient Time for the Number of Balls, which are to be given in the latter End of this Winter. Conscious of this Truth, I also beg leave to mention, that the work in Point of Strength, Convenience, and Elegance, is, and shall be executed in the best, most neat, and richest Manner.' The advertisement then described the rules of the new establishment. 'Seven ladies' had 'each of them opened a Subscription Book', each of which was 'to contain the Names of 60 Subscribers'. Each subscriber was to pay ten guineas for admission to the twelve balls which were to be given each season. 'The Entertainment of each Night to consist of a Ball, in a Room 90 Feet long, 40 Feet broad, and 30 Feet high; Tea and Cards in separate Rooms; and a Supper in a Room 65 Feet long, 40 Feet broad, and 20 Feet high, with a Concert of Music from a separate Orchestra.' These rules show that a number of fashionable patronesses provided Almack with the indispensable initial support which he needed for his venture; they therefore had some right to the despotic powers of admittance to the assemblies which they later exercised over the fashionable world.

The assembly rooms were opened on 12 February 1765, although they were not finally completed until 1767. The tickets of admission were designed by Robert Mylne. Despite its aristocratic patronage, the project appears to have been a risky venture. Almack only held a twenty-one-year lease of part of the ground on which the building was erected, and the new assembly was a direct challenge to Teresa Cornelys's entertainments, which had been established at Carlisle House in Soho Square since 1760. In December 1764 Horace Walpole noted that Mrs. Cornelys, 'apprehending the future assembly at Almack's', was already enlarging and redecorating her rooms, while Mrs. Harris thought that 'As there is already so commodious a place, [Almack's] seems an unnecessary piece of extravagance.'

In a letter of 14 February 1765 to Lord Hertford, Horace Walpole described the opening of the new rooms. 'The new Assembly Room at Almack's was opened the night before last, and they say is very magnificent, but it was empty; half the town is ill with colds, and many were afraid to go, as the house is scarce built yet. Almack advertised that it was built with hot bricks and boiling water—think what a rage there must be for public places, if this notice, instead of terrifying, could draw anybody thither. They tell me the ceilings were dropping with wet, but can you believe me, when I assure you the Duke of Cumberland was there? . . . There is a vast flight of steps, and he was forced to rest two or three times.'

Despite this unpropitious start the assembly rooms soon became firmly established. In a letter of 22 February 1765, Gilly Williams refers to the 'three very elegant new-built rooms' in which Almack provided the twelve weekly balls. There were already between three and four hundred subscribers; the ladies could lend their tickets, but 'The men's tickets are not transferable, so, if the ladies do not like us, they have no opportunity of changing us, but must meet the same persons for ever.' In the following month Gilly Williams reported that 'Our female Almacks flourishes beyond description. . . . Almack's Scotch face, in a bag-wig, waiting at Supper, would divert you, as would his lady in a sack, making tea and curtseying to the duchesses.' The great room is said to have been completed in 1767. In a letter dated 15 January 1768 George Selwyn refers to dancing 'in the new blue damask room, which by the way was intended for cards'. The Advertiser of 12 November 1768 carries the following notice:—"Mr. Almack humbly begs leave to acquaint the nobility and gentry, subscribers to the Assembly in King Street, St. James's, that the first meeting will be Thursday, 24th inst [this month]. N.B. Tickets are ready to be delivered at the Assembly Room."

William Almack died on 3 January 1781, bequeathing his house in Pall Mall to his widow and the residue of his property, including the assembly rooms, to his son William. On 28 February 1781 his only other surviving child, Elizabeth, married Dr. David Pitcairn, a Scottish physician. William Almack, the son, was a barrister; the short leases of part of the ground on which the assembly rooms stood were renewed to him and he appears to have managed the business until 1792. By this time, the prosperity of the rooms was in decline (probably due to the opening of the Pantheon in Oxford Street in 1772) and William Almack was compelled to mortgage them. He died unmarried and intestate on 27 October 1806 and his property passed to his sister Elizabeth Pitcairn. Her husband, Dr. Pitcairn, paid off the mortgages, and died in 1809. Elizabeth Pitcairn appears as the ratepayer from 1809 to 1817, and she may have managed the rooms during this period. In her will, which was proved in 1844, she left a large fortune, and the residue of her estate (including the assembly rooms) was bequeathed to her grandniece and adopted daughter, Elizabeth Campbell. The latter married Edward Calvert of Thurstonbury and their descendants retained the freehold (which had been acquired at an unknown date) until 1920.

In 1792 the rate books show James Willis as the occupant or manager of the rooms. James Willis had been the proprietor of the Thatched House Tavern in St. James's Street since 1770 and on 18 August 1768 he had married Elizabeth Tebb, niece of William Almack senior. At the time of his death in 1794, he held a twenty-one-year sub-lease of the assembly rooms. His descendants continued to manage the rooms (except perhaps for the years 1809 to 1817) until 1886–87. For the whole of this period, the Willis family were tenants of Almack's descendants. In the nineteenth century, the rooms were often referred to as Willis's Rooms.

== Almack's at its peak ==
By the beginning of the 19th century, with the Pantheon out of fashion, and the Assembly Rooms under the management of the Willises, Almack's was at the height of its reputation. People came to Almack's to see and be seen, to assert their claim to being of the highest social rank, and to network with others of the caste. For gentlemen seeking brides of suitable ton, it served as one of the marriage marts of Society. By 1790, having been presented at court as a debutante carried very little weight, as the King's court was considered rather fusty. Instead, mothers sought éclat for a daughter newly presented to society by obtaining vouchers to Almack's.

This reputation had been created by Almack's select committee of the most influential and exclusive ladies of London's high society (the ton), referred to as the Lady Patronesses of Almack's. There were six or seven Patronesses at any one time.

Traditionally, during the Regency of George IV, they are named as:

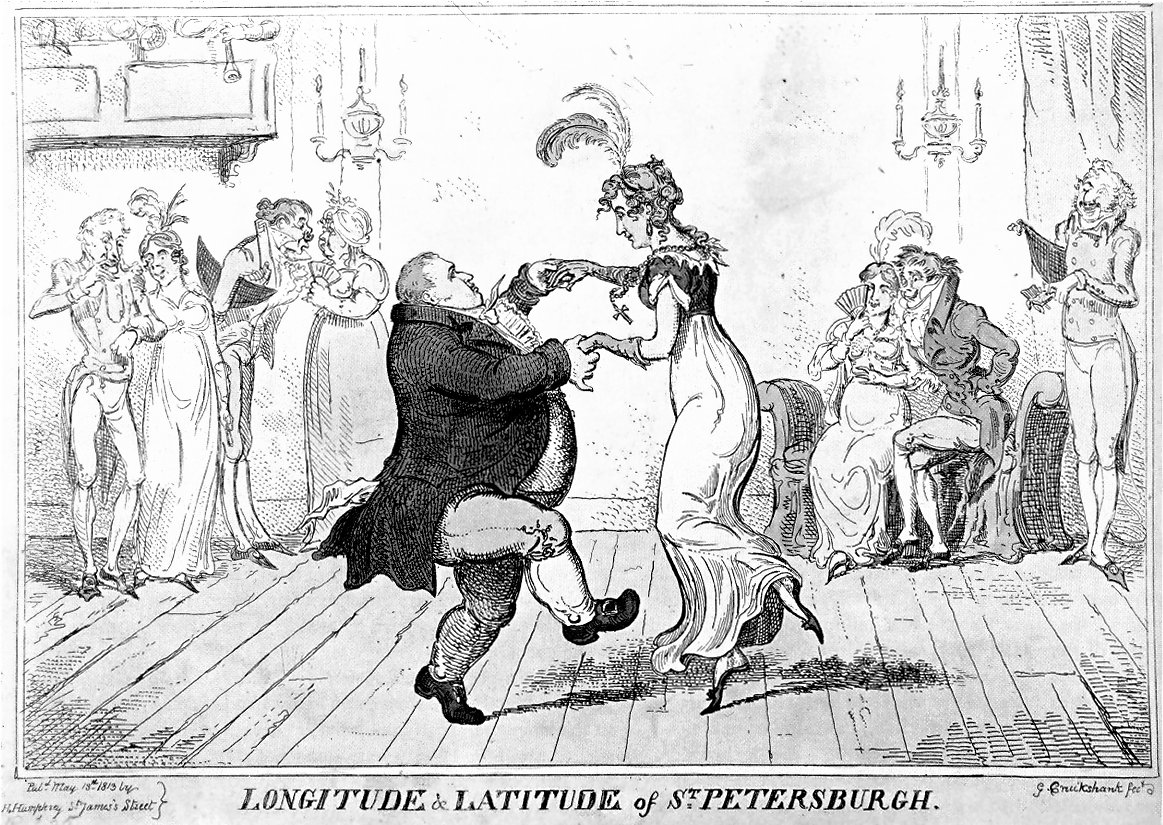
Longitude and Latitude of St Petersburgh, a caricature of Countess Lieven and a shorter and broader dance partner by George Cruikshank

- Amelia Stewart, Viscountess Castlereagh
- Sarah Villiers, Countess of Jersey, who should not be confused with her mother-in-law, Frances Villiers, Countess of Jersey, one of the more notorious mistresses of George IV when he was Prince of Wales
- Emily Clavering-Cowper, Countess Cowper, sister of the Prime Minister Lord Melbourne, and later married to another Prime Minister, Lord Palmerston
- Maria Molyneux, Countess of Sefton, wife of William Molyneux, 2nd Earl of Sefton
- The Hon. Sarah Clementina Drummond-Burrell, known as Clementina, later Lady Willoughby de Eresby. Clementina was the only surviving child of James Drummond, 1st Baron Perth. On marriage, her husband Peter Burrell, a noted dandy, assumed the family name Drummond. He succeeded his father as 2nd Baron Gwydyr and subsequently his mother as 22nd Baron Willoughby de Eresby.
- Dorothea Lieven, Countess de Lieven, wife of the Russian ambassador and a political force in her own right; Princess Lieven after 1826
- Maria Theresia, Countess Esterházy, wife of the Austrian ambassador Paul III Anton, Prince Esterházy; Princess Esterházy after 1833.

Of these lady patronesses and their establishment, the memoirist Captain Gronow would later write, "The most popular amongst these grandes dames was unquestionably Lady Cowper, now Lady Palmerston. Lady Jersey's bearing, on the contrary, was that of a theatrical tragedy queen; and whilst attempting the sublime, she frequently made herself simply ridiculous, being inconceivably rude, and in her manner often ill-bred. Lady Sefton was kind and amiable, Madame de Lieven haughty and exclusive, Princess Esterhazy was a bon enfant, Lady Castlereagh and Mrs. Burrell de très grandes dames. Many diplomatic arts, much finesse, and a host of intrigues, were set in motion to get an invitation to 'Almack's.' Very often persons whose rank and fortunes entitled them to the entrée anywhere, were excluded by the cliqueism of the lady patronesses; for the female government of 'Almack's' was a pure despotism, and subject to all the caprices of despotic rule: it is needless to add that, like every other despotism, it was not innocent of abuses. The fair ladies who ruled supreme over this little dancing and gossiping world, issued a solemn proclamation that no gentleman should appear at the assemblies without being dressed in knee-breeches, white cravat, and chapeau-bras. On one occasion, the Duke of Wellington was about to ascend the staircase of the ball-room, dressed in black trousers, when the vigilant Mr. Willis, the guardian of the establishment, stepped forward and said, 'Your Grace cannot be admitted in trousers;' whereupon the Duke, who had a great respect for orders and regulations, quietly walked away."

These "fair arbiters" created a temple of exclusivity for the balls held on Wednesday nights (the only activity of the club) by allowing only those whom they approved to buy the non-transferable annual "vouchers," costing ten guineas. A voucher was printed on strong cardboard and measured around 2.5 inches by 3.5 inches (6.25 cm by 8.75 cm), and entitled the holder to obtain tickets to balls for all or part of the season. Subscribers were allowed to bring a guest to a Ball, provided they passed muster first. He or she had to call personally at the Rooms and were either granted a "Strangers Ticket" of admission or were blackballed. The Rooms were open for supper and gaming, with dancing lasting the night. Once supper had been served at eleven o'clock, the doors were closed and no one else was admitted for the evening, regardless of rank or reputation. Once approved by the Lady Patronesses, a man or woman's social standing was guaranteed to soar. Fortunate young ladies making their first London Season and who'd been allowed to 'come out' at an Almack's ball had their dancing partners personally chosen by one of the Ladies. A passage from Lutrell's work "Advice to Julia" concerning Almack's reads:

"All on that magic list depends;
Fame, fortune, fashion, lovers, friends;
'Tis that which gratifies or vexes
All ranks, all ages, all sexes.
If once to Almack's you belong,
Like monarchs, you can do no wrong;
But banished thence on Wednesday night,
By Jove you can do nothing right."

Holding a voucher for Almack's became the difference between society and Society. Not to have a voucher might mean simply that one had not applied, or that there were more applicants than space, but to lose one's voucher meant that one had been tried and found wanting, a social disaster for those dedicated to their position in the ton. When Lady Caroline Lamb satirised Lady Jersey in her novel Glenarvon, Lady Jersey took her revenge by barring Caroline from Almack's — the ultimate social disgrace (although Lady Cowper, who was Caroline's sister-in-law, eventually got the ban lifted). Few exceptions to the strict rules were ever made, and the Lady Patronesses met every Monday night during the London social season (approximately April to August) to decide who, if anyone, might need to be removed for recent déclassé behaviour, and whom they might wish to add to the august membership. Rejection of an application might be made on a temporary or permanent basis, depending on the reason. If an applicant was refused a ticket, the news was sent via a printed circular, with a blank left to be filled up with the name. No reason for the rejection would be given beyond "The ladies-patronesses' compliments to Mr. or Miss So-and-so, and are sorry they cannot comply with his or her request." The circular would then be left with Mr Willis, and the applicant would only learn the result by calling on him for the answer.

The small size of the rooms contributed to the air of exclusivity. Far smaller than the Pantheon, the average attendance at an Almack's ball was 500; "the largest attendance ever known on any one occasion was about 650; which is a number much too great for the size of the room." Accordingly, the number of members of Almack's was limited to between 700 and 800.

Money was not a key to being a member of Almack's, which existed to exclude the nouveau riche. Possession of a noble title was a recommendation, though breeding and behaviour were more important. Even a duke or duchess might find himself or herself barred if one or other of the patronesses disliked them. It was said three-quarters of the hereditary nobility begged, in vain, to be admitted; and the "sons of commerce", who would readily be found at any other social event, would "never think of intruding on the sacred Wednesday evenings". On the other hand, Thomas Moore, a penniless Irish poet admired for his breeding and social graces, was a member.

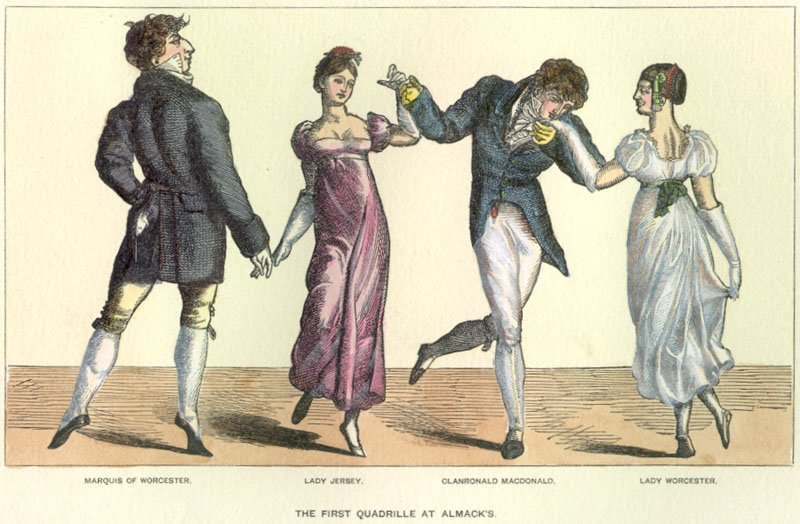
The First Quadrille at Almack's: a French print supposedly representing Lady Jersey, Lady Worcester, Lord Worcester and Clanronald Macdonald, though Gronow says it was danced by Lady Jersey, Lady Susan Ryder, Miss Montgomery and Lady Harriet Butler, with the Count St Aldegonde, Mr Montagu, Mr Montgomery and Mr Charles Standish.

The ballroom was partitioned off for the dancers by crimson ropes. In the early 19th century, the orchestra was from Edinburgh, and conducted by Nathaniel Gow, son of the celebrated Niel Gow; later on, in the early Victorian era, Weippert and Collinet's band provided the music. To avoid any suggestion of impropriety, dances were initially limited to English country dances and Scotch reels. This changed some time after the declaration of the Regency, when first the quadrille and then the waltz, at that time more like the modern polka, were introduced. According to Raikes, these were first danced at Almack's in 1813; to Gronow, in 1815; and to Dancing in the Badminton Library, in 1816. The introduction of the quadrille is strongly associated with Lady Jersey, and the waltz definitely linked to Countess de Lieven. As late as 1823, this could still lead to offence: "I went two nights ago to a costume ball at Almack's for a Welsh charity. It was very brilliant & there was a quadrille that was beautiful…The quadrille, however, gave great offence, for they danced together all night & took the upper end of the room, which was considered a great impertinence." By 1837, matters had so far changed that the gallopade and the waltz were now the only things danced at the Almack's balls.

The club took pains not to resemble expensive private balls by avoiding sumptuous repasts. In the Regency period, refreshments in the supper rooms consisted of thinly sliced bread (which must be a day old to be sliced that thinly) with fresh butter, and dry cake (dry meaning unfrosted, without icing, not stale), probably similar to pound cake. To avoid drunkenness, only tea and lemonade were served in the supper rooms. By the 1830s, refreshments had fallen off in quality: "Now there is no supper; there is nothing in the shape of refreshments but tea and lemonade, and the worst of it is, that both articles are so miserably bad that it requires an effort to drink either. The lemonade is sour as vinegar; while to apply the word tea to the stuff called by that name at Almack's, were one of the most unwarrantable perversions of language ever perpetrated. Give it to any person with-out calling it by any name, and that person will soon find one for himself. He will at once call it chalk and water."

== Decline of Almack's ==
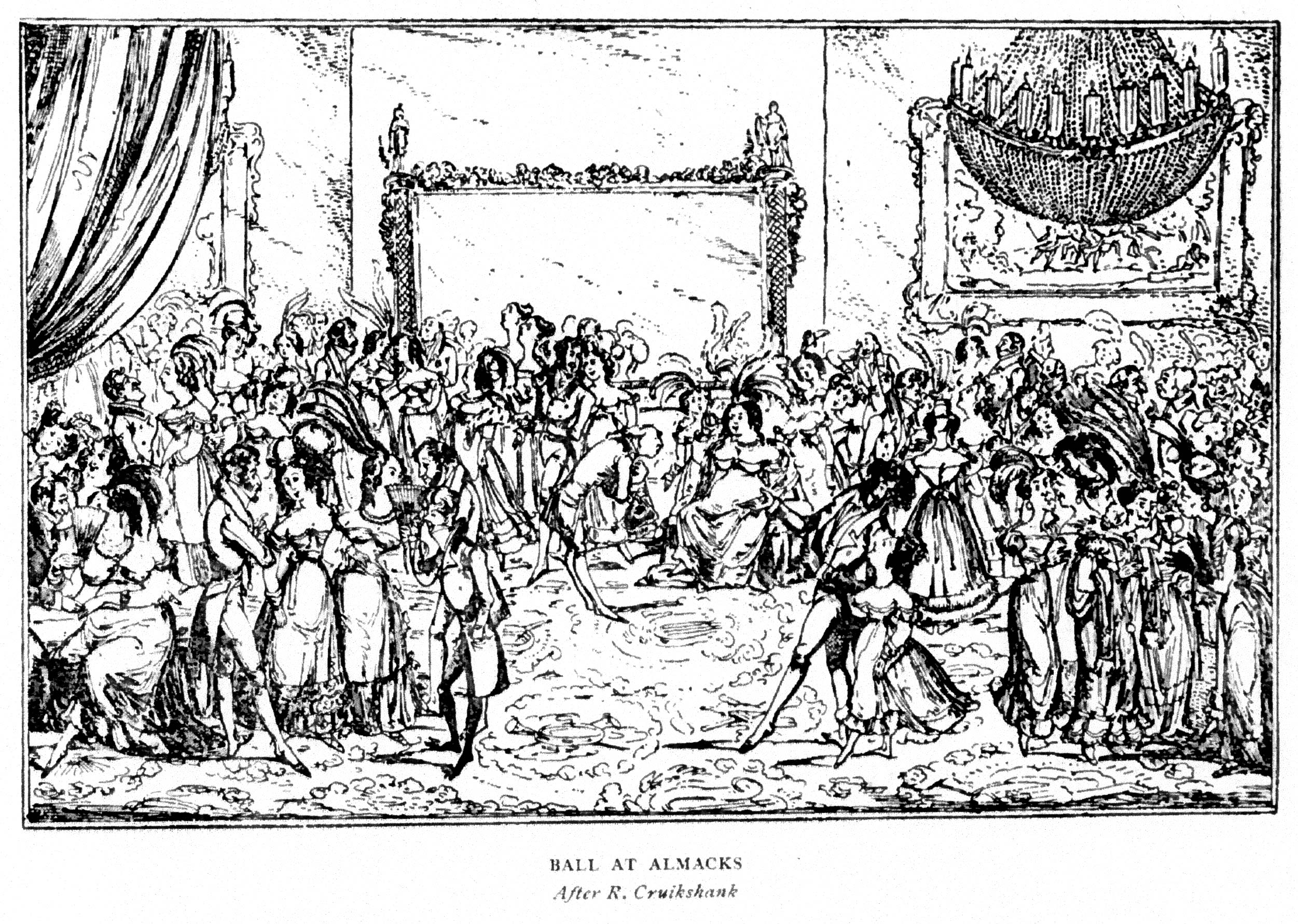
After Cruikshank's view of the ballroom

By 1825, Almack's was showing signs of deterioration, despite its continuing popularity. Prince Puckler-Muskau, visiting London in April 1825, wrote: "The first Almack's ball took place this evening; and from all I had heard of this celebrated assembly, I was really curious to see it: but never were my expectations so disappointed. It was not much better than at Brighton. A large bare room, with a bad floor, and ropes round it, like the space in an Arab camp parted off for the horses; two or three naked rooms at the side, in which were served the most wretched refreshments; and a company into which, spite of the immense difficulty of getting tickets, a great many 'Nobodies' had wriggled; in which the dress was generally as tasteless as the tournure was bad; – this was all. In a word, a sort of inn-entertainment: – the music and the lighting the only good things. And yet Almack's is the culminating point of the English world of fashion."

The decline in popularity of the balls appears to have begun about 1835. In 1837, writers could still say of the Lady Patronesses that they "have the power, by their single fiat, of making or unmaking entire families. They can open or shut the doors of fashionable life on them, by the mere circumstance of giving or withholding a ticket to Almack's. The proudest and most aristocratic family in the land are fain to bow down, and with cap in hand, to use a homely but expressive phrase, supplicate " a subscription" from this "coalition cabal." To be a member of Almack's is a sure passport to the very first society: it is to give either a lady or gentleman the highest status in the world of fashion to which human beings can attain." By 1840, a contemporary Quarterly Review could find in Almack's "a clear proof that the palmy days of exclusiveness are gone by in England; and though it is obviously impossible to prevent any given number of persons from congregating and re-establishing an oligarchy, we are quite sure that the attempt would be ineffectual, and that the sense of their importance would extend little beyond the set."

James Willis, junior, died on 2 January 1847. The two businesses at the Thatched House Tavern and the assembly rooms were then managed jointly by James Willis's son, Frederick, and William Willis's son, Charles. The Thatched House Tavern appears to have come to an end in 1861. The assembly rooms were managed by Frederick and Charles Willis until 1869, when Frederick appears to have become sole proprietor. The rooms were redecorated by Mr. Kuckuck in 1860, but it was already clear Almack's as an institution was dying; the assemblies are said to have come to an end in 1863.

== Other uses of the Assembly Rooms through the years ==
From the beginning, Almack's/Willis's Assembly Rooms had many uses beyond the Almack's Balls. Other balls were also held there. In July 1821, a splendid ball was given there in honour of the coronation of George IV by the special Ambassador from France, the Duc de Grammont. The King himself was present, attended by some of his royal brothers, the Duke of Wellington, and a numerous circle of courtiers. "Whatever French taste, directed by a Grammont, could do," writes Mr. Rush in his Court of London, "to render the night agreeable, was witnessed. His suite of young gentlemen from Paris stood ready to receive the British fair on their approach to the rooms, and from baskets of flowers presented them with rich bouquets. Each lady thus entered the ballroom with one in her hand; and a thousand posies of sweet flowers displayed their hues, and exhaled their fragrance as the dancing commenced."

Besides balls, the rooms were let for public meetings, dramatic readings, concerts, and for dinners. Saturday 11 February 1792 saw the first of Samuel Harrison and Charles Knyvett's Vocal Concerts, a series that would continue until 1821. Between 1845 and 1858, John Ella's Musical Union gave eight concerts a year of chamber music in the rooms. Hector Berlioz was on the podium at the rooms on 7 April 1848 when he conducted his "Hungarian March" from La damnation de Faust at a concert of the Amateur Musical Society. And the Quartet Association (which included the 'cellist Alfredo Piatti and the pianist/conductors Charles Hallé and Sterndale Bennett) gave concerts at the Rooms between 1852 and 1855 in an attempt to popularise chamber music.

Here, from 1808 to 1810, Mrs. Billington, Mr. Braham, and Signor Naldi gave concerts, in rivalry with Madame Catalini at Hanover Square Rooms. In 1839 Master Bassle, thirteen years old, appeared in a performance; and in 1844 the rooms were taken by Charles Kemble, for the purpose of giving his readings from Shakespeare. In 1851, while The Great Exhibition was attracting its thousands, Thackeray appeared in public in the rooms as a lecturer, taking as his subject "The English Humorists". "Among the most conspicuous of the literary ladies at this gathering was Miss Brontë the authoress of 'Jane Eyre.' She had never before seen the author of 'Vanity Fair,' though the second edition of her own celebrated novel was dedicated to him by her, with the assurance that she regarded him 'as the social regenerator of his day—as the very master of that working corps who would restore to rectitude the warped state of things.' Mrs. Gaskell tells us that, when the lecture was over, the lecturer descended from the platform, and making his way towards her, frankly asked her for her opinion. 'This,' adds Miss Brontë's biographer, 'she mentioned to me not many days afterwards, adding remarks almost identical with those which I subsequently read in "Villette," where a similar action on the part of M. Paul Emanuel is related.'"

A political meeting of Whigs, Peelites and Radicals on 6 June 1859 saw the formation of the modern Liberal Party. On 4 March 1863 the first AGM of the National Rifle Association took place, chaired by the Duke of Cambridge. On 25 June 1865, the Palestine Exploration Fund (PEF) was founded at Willis's Rooms. The meeting was chaired by the first president of the society, The Bishop of York. Also present in attendance were the "Bishop of London, Lord Strangford, the Right Hon. Mr. Layard, the Count de Vogue, the Dean of Westminster, the Dean of Canterbury, Sir Roderick Murchison, Mr. Gifford Palgrave, Professor Owen, the Rev. H. B. Tristram, and Mr. Gilbert Scott." It was agreed that the organization would be dedicated to academic study of the archaeology, topography, geography, manner and customs, geology, and natural history of the Holy Land. Another significant public meeting held at Willis's Rooms, on 4 August 1870, saw the foundation of the British Red Cross.

Following the demolition of the Thatched House Tavern on St James's Street (between 1843 and 1863), the Dilettanti Society used the rooms for their regular meetings. The members of the society would dine in the rooms every fortnight during the "London season"; the walls of the apartment were hung with the portraits of the members, most of which were transferred from the Thatched House prior to demolition.

== After Almack's ==
In 1886–7 the business was purchased by a company, Willis's Rooms Limited, and in 1892 the building was considerably altered and the whole of the King Street front was refaced in cement. From 1893 part of the building was occupied by a firm of auctioneers, Messrs. Robinson and Fisher, who later became Messrs. Robinson and Foster Ltd and on the ground floor there were shops, often occupied by fine-art dealers. Other parts of the building were occupied by a restaurant and a succession of clubs; from 1915 to 1922 Horatio Bottomley, M.P., had rooms there.

The building was destroyed by enemy action on 23 February 1944 in the war of 1939–45; the site is now occupied by a block of offices called Almack House (bearing a brass plaque commemorating the existence of Almack's on that spot), erected in 1949–50.

A new social club named "Almack's" was founded in 1904, and was still in existence in 1911.

== The Building ==
The original building was constructed in the Palladian style, and located on the south side of King Street. Evidence of the appearance of the building is limited. A water-colour view of the exterior indicates it to have been utilitarian, the front of plain brickwork, with the great room expressed by the six round-arched windows of the second storey, and the entrance dressed with a pedimented Ionic doorcase. Two passages penetrated the ground storey, in the east part of which were two shops with a mezzanine over, and at the west end, there were three storeys of accommodation, with a mezzanine over the ground floor.

Sources of information about the interior include the view of 'The Ball Room, Willis's Rooms' in Old and New London, and an illustration by Cruikshank in Life in London (1821). The illustration in Old and New London almost certainly shows the great room (described in sources as being one hundred feet in length by forty feet in width, and "one of the most beautiful in London) after its redecoration by Kuckuck in 1860, but under the heavy Victorian overlay can be seen the elegance depicted by Cruikshank. It seems clear, therefore, that the walls were divided into bays by a Composite order, with paired pilasters between the windows or panels of the long side walls, and single columns between the five bays of each end wall. Cruikshank suggests that the unfluted shafts were marbled or of scagliola. Between the capitals, the bays were decorated with a frieze of festoons and paterae, and below these were oblong panels with relief subjects. In Cruikshank's time, the windows were furnished with elegant scrolled pelmet-heads of gilt wood supporting swagged draperies, and Rococo looking-glasses filled some of the wall panels. He shows the orchestra playing in a balcony with a gilt trellised railing, but in a position it can hardly have occupied, and two-tiered crystal chandeliers hang from the ceiling. In the Old and New London view, these have been replaced by huge lustres of cut glass, hanging from a flat ceiling with a shallow segmental cove, the general form of which was probably original. Not shown in the earlier illustration, but reported by sources at the time, are the sofas which lined the walls for the guests to sit on between dances, the ladies-patronesses having a sofa to themselves at the upper end. Besides the great ballroom, the building also included card rooms and supper rooms.

== In fiction ==
Almack's, in its heyday, appears or is mentioned in some of the "silver fork novels" of the time. These notably included Almack's by Marianne Spencer Hudson (1827) and Almack's Revisited by Charles White (1828).

Almack's and its patronesses also appear frequently in the Regency romances of Georgette Heyer and many other authors of the genre. Heyer stresses the crucial importance to one's social standing of gaining admission to the club: "the right of entry (to Almack's) conferred on the recipient a greater distinction than a Court presentation, and was far more difficult to obtain". Despite the fact that the actual entertainment was notoriously dull and the refreshments inferior, exclusion from Almack's was the ultimate social failure.

In a significant speech made at a banquet for the London Metropolitan Sanitary Association on 10 May 1851, a speech which prefigured the publication of Bleak House in serial form in March 1852, Charles Dickens referred to Almack's: 'That no man could estimate the amount of mischief grown in dirt - that no man could say the evil stops here or stops there, either to its moral or physical effects, or could deny that it begins in the cradle or was not at rest in the grave - was as certain as it was, that the air from Gin-Lane would not be carried by an easterly wind into May-fair, or that the furious pestilence raging in St Giles's, no mortal list of lady patronesses could keep out of Almack's.' On early manuscripts for Bleak House the title was given as Bleak House and the East Wind.

== See also ==
- List of London's gentlemen's clubs
