= Teresa Cornelys =

Italian opera singer

- Born: Anna Maria Teresa Imer; 1723; Venice
- Died: 19 August 1797 (aged 73–74); Fleet Prison, London
- Occupation: Opera Singer

Teresa Cornelys (sometimes spelt Theresa; born Anna Maria Teresa Imer; 1723 in Venice – 19 August 1797 in Fleet Prison, London) was an operatic soprano and impresario who hosted fashionable gatherings at Carlisle House in Soho Square. She also had numerous lovers, including Casanova, who was the father of her daughter.

== Early life and opera career ==
Her father, Giuseppe Imer, was an opera impresario and her mother, Paolina, an actress. Her sister Marianna was also an opera singer. Teresa was initiated into seduction by her mother, who had her torment the aged senator Alvise Malipiero, who fell desperately in love with her. At the same time she met Casanova, then the senator's protégé. But she refused the senator's offer of marriage. In 1745, Malipiero died and she followed Angelo Pompeati, a dancer and choreographer and former Master of the Venetian Ballet to Vienna, where he was working at the court of Empress Maria Theresa, and they were married in St. Stephen's Cathedral. However, within months she left him behind for an operatic engagement at the King's Theatre in Haymarket, London.

Her first child, Giuseppe, was almost born on stage in Vienna, in 1746. Her husband never acknowledged him. After a period travelling with Gluck and his opera company, her second child was born in Bayreuth in 1753 and was named Wilhelmine after Wilhelmine of Prussia, the wife of the Margrave Frederick, who may have been the child's father. She was back in Bayreuth after a sojourn in Italy when her daughter by Casanova was born early in 1754, and the child was named Sophia Wilhelmina Frederica, again after the margravine. Later that year she left her husband forever, initially for Paris. By the time Sophia was four, Teresa was leading a peripatetic, increasingly financially desperate existence while entertaining a multitude of lovers. During this period she called herself Madame de Trenti, claiming it was the name of her family estate. She was at one point in charge of all the theatres in the Austrian Netherlands. Wilhelmine and a baby to whom Teresa had given birth in Paris both died; Teresa was imprisoned for debt in Paris; in 1759 Giuseppe was taken away by Casanova to be raised.

Teresa's first appearance in London in 1746, in Gluck's La Caduta de' Giganti, had not been a success. A contemporary review was:

though nominally second woman, [she] had such a masculine and violent manner of singing that few female symptoms were perceptible

However, in 1759 she was persuaded to return by a man who was then calling himself John Freeman. He had been baptised John Boorder but had inherited a fortune and after that used the name John Fermor in England; he was a cellist and double bassist who told her that he was a Church of England clergyman and that she could make a fortune in London.

== Life in London ==
She returned to England in 1759 from Rotterdam, using the first name of her lover there, Cornelis de Rigerboos, as her surname and presenting herself as Madame Cornelys, a widow; claiming widowhood gave her added respectability and sympathy, but also entailed greater legal rights. In 1760, working through Fermor because she did not yet speak enough English herself, she rented Carlisle House, a large, well-appointed mansion in fashionable Soho Square with outbuildings at the rear along a side street, for £180 a year. She was assisted in this by the patronage of Elizabeth Chudleigh, later to be the bigamous wife of a duke. In autumn that year she began giving entertainments there by subscription, in other words by selling tickets in advance.

At first her entertainments included only card games and dancing, but she met with sufficient success to buy the leasehold of the house and have a large extension built on the site of the rear buildings and part of the garden, consisting of a concert hall or ballroom above a supper room which seated four hundred at a vast crescent-shaped table. She had a copper plate set into the foundations with the inscription:

Not Vain but Grateful In Honour of the Society [of her first subscribers] and my first Protectress Ye Honble Mrs. Elizabeth Chudleigh is Laid the First Stone of this edifice June 19, 1761 by me Teresa Cornelys.

She also extensively refurbished the house, and added sumptuous furnishings. Much of the furniture was hired – the ballroom furnishings alone were valued at £730 – and she had much of the work done on credit or in exchange for large numbers of tickets to her entertainments. She was already having problems with creditors and seizures of furnishings in February 1762. However, the entertainments were an immense success, particularly the elaborate masked balls. She had to have a new door put in to accommodate the crowds, and attendees included members of the royal family, the Prince of Monaco, the King of Denmark and his entourage and "half the peerage". In February 1770, Parliament adjourned early to enable members to attend one of her masquerades. Laurence Sterne called a visit to Mrs Cornelys' "the best assembly and the best concert I ever had the honour to be at." In The Expedition of Humphry Clinker, published in 1771, Tobias Smollett writes of "Mrs. Cornelys' assembly, which for the rooms, the company, the dresses, and decorations, surpasses all description". In Thackeray's The Luck of Barry Lyndon the narrator recalls that "[a]ll the high and low demireps of the town gathered there". Dickens wrote in an article on Soho that "the world was dying to be on Mrs. Cornelys's list." For her concerts, she engaged the best musicians available, including Johann Christian Bach, Carl Friedrich Abel, Stephen Storace and Carl Friedrich Weichsel. She held events once or twice a month, mainly in the winter season. Her response to the opening of rival establishments was to redecorate with even greater opulence, including redoing two rooms in Chinese style and having a Chinese bridge built to connect the house and the public rooms behind it, and to advertise in the papers:

[T]he alterations and additions to Carlisle House in Soho Square, performing by Messrs. Phillips and Shakespeare, together with all the new embellishments and furniture adding thereto by Mrs. Cornelys, will this year alone, amount to little less than 2000 [£] and that, when finished, it will be, by far, the most magnificent place of public entertainment in Europe.

[A]mongst her other elegant alterations [she] has devised the most curious, singular, and superb ceiling to one of the rooms that ever was executed or even thought of.

She reputedly spent £5,000 between 1767 and 1772 alone. She was successful in maintaining her establishment at the height of fashion, although attendees continued to remark on how crowded it was. Frances Burney wrote in 1770:

The magnificence of the rooms, splendour of the illuminations and embellishments, and the brilliant appearance of the company exceeded anything I ever before saw. The apartments were so crowded we had scarce room to move, which was quite disagreeable, nevertheless, the flight of apartments both upstairs and on the ground floor seemed endless … The Rooms were so full and so hot that nobody attempted to dance … I must own this evening's entertainment more disappointed my expectations than any I ever spent; for I had imagined it would have been the most charming in the world.

Madame Cornelys was highly successful as an entrepreneur. According to Casanova, she had a country house in Hammersmith with "three secretaries, thirty-two servants, six horses, a mute and a lady companion". Her daughter was well educated at a Catholic convent there. She controlled many details of the events, including who could attend (through a committee of ladies headed by Mrs Chudleigh and including Mary Bertie, wife of the Duke of Ancaster and Kesteven, who was part of a "racy set" of women keen on partying and heavy spending) and what they were allowed to wear; hooped skirts took up too much room. When the throng outside the house on gala nights led to carriage collisions, she instituted London's first one-way system, stating in her advertising that coachmen must draw up with the heads of the horses towards Greek Street. However, she was a terrible businesswoman, spending more on the events and publicity for them than she took in, hardly ever paying employees or tradesmen on time, continuing to borrow, and with such a poor head for business that people stole from her freely.

In January 1771 she began to present operas, including Artaxerxes by Thomas Arne, with Gaetano Guadagni in a leading role. Operatic performances were illegal without a royal licence; Madame Cornelys claimed unsuccessfully that they were charity benefits, as reported by Horace Walpole:

To avoid the Act, she pretended to take no money, and had the assurance to advertise that the subscription was to provide coals for the poor. ... I concluded she would open a bawdy house next for the interests of the Foundling Hospital, and I am not quite mistaken, for they say one of her maids, gained by Mr. Hobart, affirms that she could not undergo the fatigue of making the beds so often.

She and Guadagni were fined; at her next operatic presentation she charged extra to cover the fine. She ultimately did apply for a licence, but her application was denied. In her application she states that:

[on arriving in England and discovering] that the most extensive, most opulent, and most important City in Europe was the only one of note that had not a settled Entertainment for the select reception and amusement of the Nobility and Gentry, . . . after struggling with a Siege of Troubles during a longer Period than the Siege of Troy [and producing for the nobility and gentry] a species of a more elegant dramatic musical Amusement than any they had ever had before, [she had become embroiled in] vexatious and expensive Prosecutions, as interestedly litigious, as innocently incurred.

== Imprisonment and death ==
Madame Cornelys was in and out of debt and debtors' prison again and again until, in 1772, Carlisle House was seized and its contents auctioned off. A group of her creditors bought it for a low price at a hastily arranged auction sale. Meanwhile, having secured her release from prison, she bought a hotel in Southampton and ran it until it failed; in 1775, back in London, she organised a Venetian regatta on the Thames and then returned to Carlisle House, this time as manager. She held two immensely successful seasons of "rural masquerades", decorating the interiors of the reception rooms with fresh turf, hedges, exotic blooms, goldfish swimming in a fountain and pine trees in the concert room. However, she then slid back into bankruptcy, and in 1779 was imprisoned in the King's Bench Prison. She escaped in June 1780 when the prison was set on fire during the Gordon Riots, but was recaptured in Westminster in August.

In 1795 she was using the name Mrs Smith and selling asses' milk in Knightsbridge; she tried unsuccessfully to organise a series of breakfasts with royal patronage. Her son, whom she had sent for to help her run Carlisle House, had not been much help then, having been raised as an idle aristocrat, but he did help support her in her later years; he was a tutor to the Earl of Pomfret, but predeceased his mother. She died in the Fleet Prison, aged 74, apparently from breast cancer. Actress Becky Wells, who visited her there, reported that "in stepping into the carriage to go to prison, she struck her breast against the door, which caused her a most shocking cancer."
