= Princess Maria Theresia of Thurn and Taxis (1794–1874) =

Princess Esterházy of Galántha

Princess Maria Theresia
- Princess Esterházy of Galántha

Princess Esterházy of Galántha
- Tenure: 15 November 1833 – 21 May 1866
- Born: 6 July 1794; Regensburg, Holy Roman Empire
- Died: 18 August 1874 (aged 80); Hütteldorf, Penzing, Vienna
- Spouse: Paul III Anton, Prince Esterházy (m. 1812; died 1866)
- Issue: Princess Maria Theresia; Princess Theresia Rosa; Nikolaus III, Prince Esterházy
Names
- German: Maria Theresia
- House: Thurn and Taxis
- Father: Karl Alexander, 5th Prince of Thurn and Taxis
- Mother: Duchess Therese of Mecklenburg-Strelitz

Princess Maria Theresia of Thurn and Taxis, (full German name: Maria Theresia, Prinzessin von Thurn und Taxis, 6 July 1794 – 18 August 1874) was a member of the House of Thurn and Taxis and a Princess of Thurn and Taxis by birth and a member of the House of Esterházy and Princess Esterházy of Galántha from 25 November 1833 to 21 May 1866 through her marriage to Paul III Anthony, 8th Prince Esterházy of Galántha.

== Family ==
Maria Theresia was the third child and second daughter of Karl Alexander, 5th Prince of Thurn and Taxis and his wife Duchess Therese of Mecklenburg-Strelitz. She was an elder sister of Maximilian Karl, 6th Prince of Thurn and Taxis.

== Marriage, diplomatic work, and issue ==
Maria Theresia married Prince Paul Anthony Esterházy of Galántha, eldest child and son of Nicholas II, 7th Prince Esterházy of Galántha and his wife Princess Maria Josepha of Liechtenstein, on 18 June 1812 in Regensburg, Kingdom of Bavaria. Maria Theresia and Paul Anthony had three children:

- Princess Maria Theresia Esterházy of Galántha (27 May 1813 – 14 May 1894), ancestress of Gloria, Princess of Thurn and Taxis
- Princess Theresia Rosa Esterházy of Galántha (12 July 1815 – 28 February 1894)
- Nicholas III, 9th Prince Esterházy of Galántha (25 June 1817 – 28 January 1894)

Esterházy was a popular diplomat and Maria Theresia became admired by his contemporaries, especially during the Congress of Vienna of 1814-5. She and her mother-in-law, Princess Maria Esterházy, collaborated to host a bal d'enfants or children's ball, which was attended by major aristocratic and diplomatic families.

During his long tenure as Austrian Ambassador to the United Kingdom (1815-1842), she became a leader of fashionable society. In 1839, she was one of the notable dignitaries who participated in the Eglinton Tournament reenactment, along with Georgiana Seymour, Duchess of Somerset.

Princess Esterházy was invited to become one of the patronesses of Almack's, the centre of London social life: the patronesses had the final say as to who was and who was not socially acceptable. Due to her youth she was described as "a nice child" though Dorothea Lieven criticised her as an attention seeker.

== Ancestry ==
Ancestors of Princess Maria Theresia of Thurn and Taxis (1794–1874)

8. Alexander Ferdinand, 3rd Prince of Thurn and Taxis
4. Karl Anselm, 4th Prince of Thurn and Taxis
9. Princess Sophie Christine of Brandenburg-Bayreuth
2. Karl Alexander, 5th Prince of Thurn and Taxis
10. Charles Alexander, Duke of Württemberg
5. Duchess Auguste of Württemberg
11. Princess Maria Augusta of Thurn and Taxis
1. Princess Maria Theresia of Thurn and Taxis
12. Duke Charles Louis Frederick of Mecklenburg-Strelitz
6. Charles II, Grand Duke of Mecklenburg-Strelitz
13. Princess Elisabeth Albertine of Saxe-Hildburghausen
3. Duchess Therese of Mecklenburg-Strelitz
14. Prince George William of Hesse-Darmstadt
7. Princess Friederike of Hesse-Darmstadt
15. Countess Maria Louise Albertine of Leiningen-Dagsburg-Falkenburg

Princess Maria Theresia of Thurn and Taxis (1794–1874) House of Thurn and Taxis Cadet branch of the House of Tassis Born: 6 July 1794 Died: 18 August 1874
Hungarian nobility
Preceded by Princess Maria Josepha of Liechtenstein	Princess Esterházy of Galántha; 25 November 1833 – 21 May 1866	Succeeded by Princess Eugénie of Croÿ
