= Paul III Anton, Prince Esterházy =

Hungarian prince (1786–1866)

His Serene Highness The Prince Esterházy OSS OGF
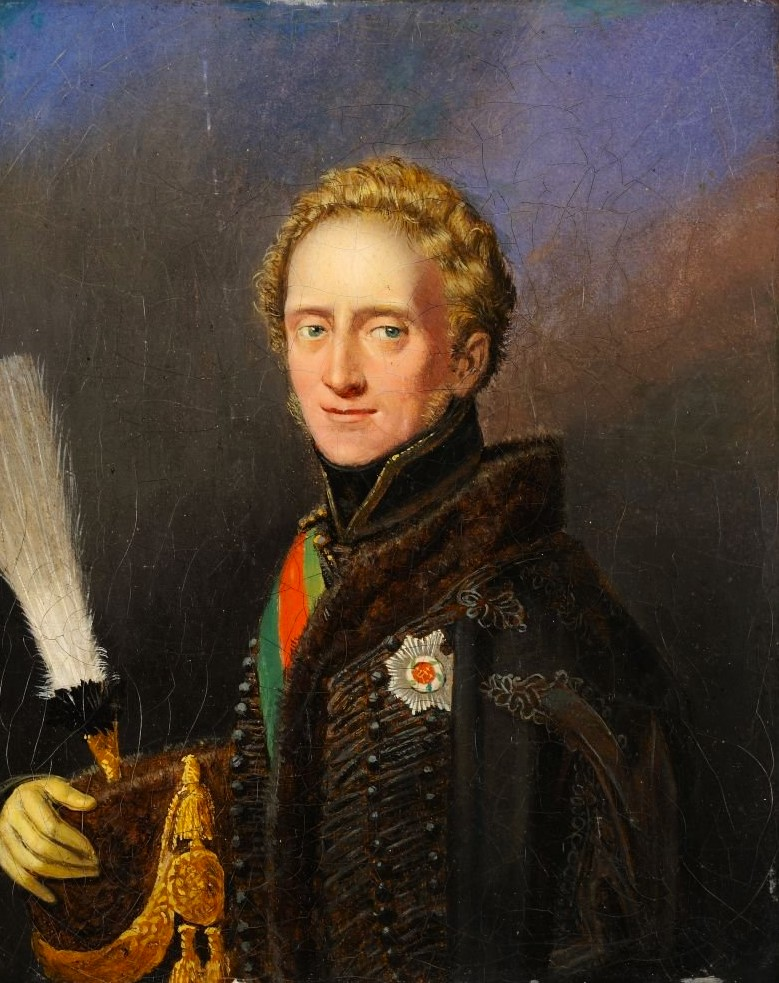
- Portrait by Miklós Barabás

Minister besides the King of Hungary
- In office 7 April 1848 – 9 September 1848
- Monarch: Ferdinand V
- Prime Minister: Lajos Batthyány
- Preceded by: Office established
- Succeeded by: Kázmér Batthyány

8th Prince Esterházy of Galántha
- In office 25 November 1833 – 21 May 1866
- Preceded by: Nikolaus II
- Succeeded by: Nikolaus III

Personal details
- Born: 11 March 1786 Vienna, Archduchy of Austria, Holy Roman Empire
- Died: 21 May 1866 (aged 80) Regensburg, Kingdom of Bavaria
- Party: Conservative Party
- Spouse: Princess Maria Theresia of Thurn and Taxis (m. 1812)
- Children: 4, including Miklós Pál
- Parents: Nikolaus II, Prince Esterházy (father); Princess Maria Josepha von Liechtenstein (mother)
- Occupation: Diplomat; Politician
- Cabinet: Batthyány Government
- Noble Family: Esterházy

Paul III Anton, Prince Esterházy (German: Paul Anton Esterházy von Galantha; 11 March 1786 – 21 May 1866) was a Hungarian prince, a member of the famous Esterházy family. He was the son of Prince Nikolaus II and succeeded his father on the latter's death in 1833.

== The basis of his wealth ==
For several generations, the Esterházy family had been exceedingly wealthy. The wealth came from their extensive landholdings, mostly in Hungary. In 1848, the American author John Stevens Cabot Abbott wrote the following of him:

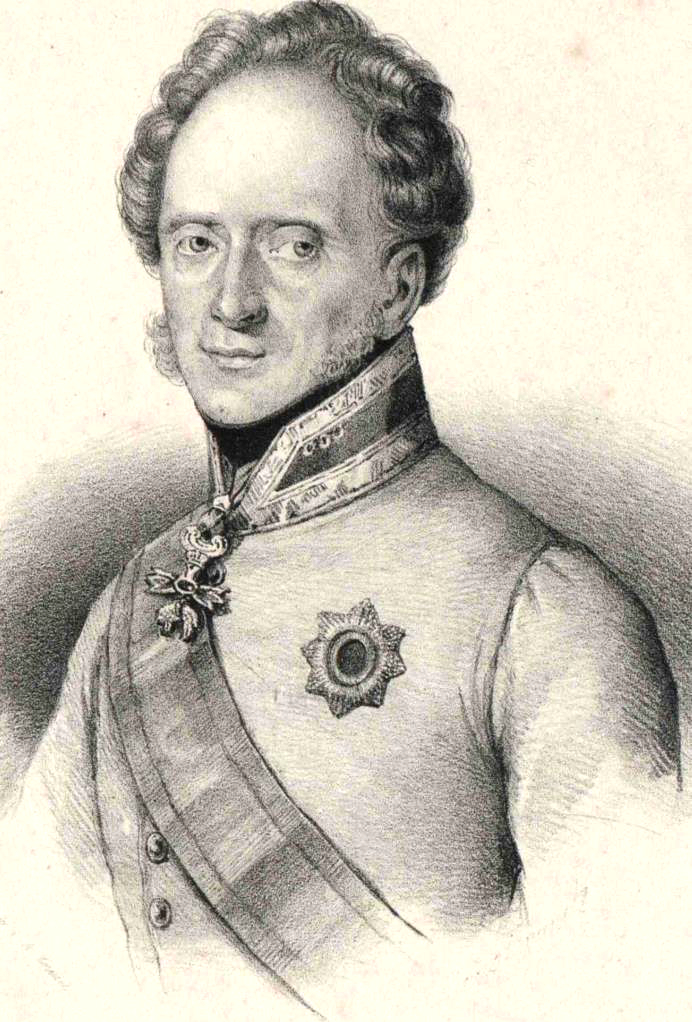
Prince Esterházy in 1830

[In Hungary,] the feudal system still exists in all its ancient barbaric splendor. Prince Esterhazy, a Hungarian baron, is probably the richest man, who is not seated on a throne, in the world. He lives in the highest style of earthly grandeur. One of his four magnificent palaces contains three hundred and sixty rooms for guests, and a theater. His estates embrace one hundred and thirty villages, forty towns, and thirty-four castles. By the old feudal law, still undisturbed, he possesses unlimited power over his vassals, and can imprison, scourge, and slay at pleasure ... He has quite a little band of troops in his pay, and moves with military pomp and gorgeous retinue from palace to palace.

The Prince's wealth came partly from the great number of peasants who owed him a portion of the fruits of their labours. He also had his own enterprises, directed by his staff, notably sheep raising. Of his enormous flock, Abbott relates:

Not long ago he visited England, and was a guest of the Lord of Holkham, one of the most wealthy proprietors of that island. While looking upon a very beautiful flock of two thousand sheep, the Lord of Holkham inquired if Esterhazy could show as fine a flock upon his estates. The wealthy baron smilingly replied, "My shepherds are more numerous than your sheep." This was literally true, for Esterhazy has two thousand five hundred shepherds.

Despite his great wealth, Paul managed to spend beyond his means, getting into financial trouble just as his father had. According to the Encyclopædia Britannica Eleventh Edition, "the last years of his life were spent in comparative poverty and isolation, as even the Esterházy-Forchtenstein estates were unequal to the burden of supporting his fabulous extravagance and had to be placed in the hands of curators." His successor Nikolaus III got out of debt in part by selling the famous family art collection.

== Career as diplomat and politician ==
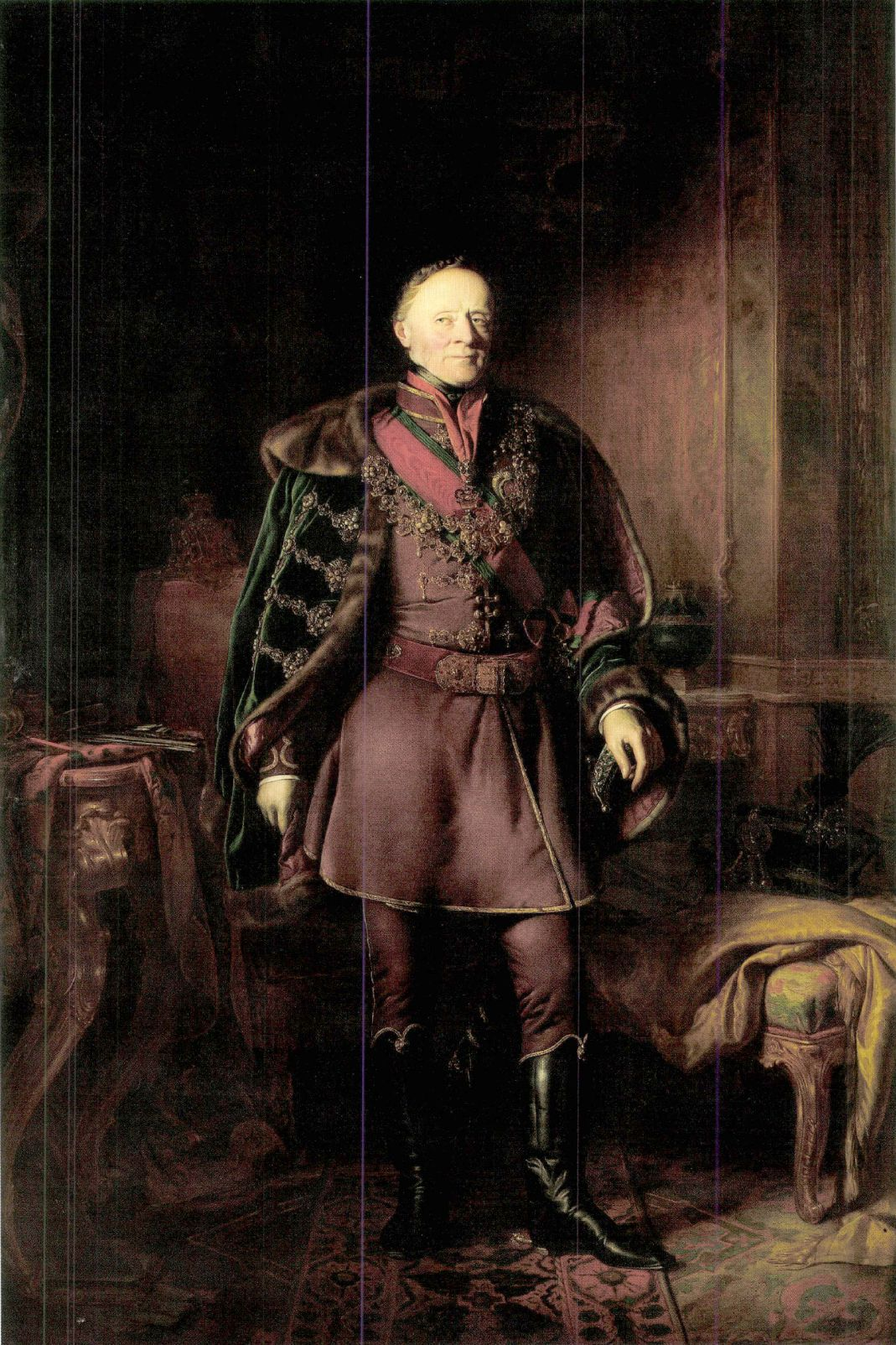
Pál Esterházy as the Minister besides the King in the Batthyány Government

While most of Paul's ancestors had served the Empire as military officers, Paul instead pursued a career in diplomacy, and later politics.

In 1806 he was secretary of the embassy in London, and in 1807 worked with Metternich in the same capacity in Paris. In 1810 he was accredited to the court of Dresden, where he tried in vain to detach Saxony from Napoleon, and in 1814 he accompanied his father on a secret mission to Rome. He took a leading part in all the diplomatic negotiations consequent upon the wars of 1813–1815, especially at the Congress of Châtillon. After the Congress of Vienna (1815) he was appointed as ambassador to the United Kingdom at the request of the Prince Regent. His wife Maria Theresia became extremely popular in London, and was a patroness of Almack's club, the centre of fashionable society. In 1824 he represented Austria as ambassador extraordinary at the coronation of Charles X of France, and was the premier Austrian commissioner at the London conferences of 1830–1836.

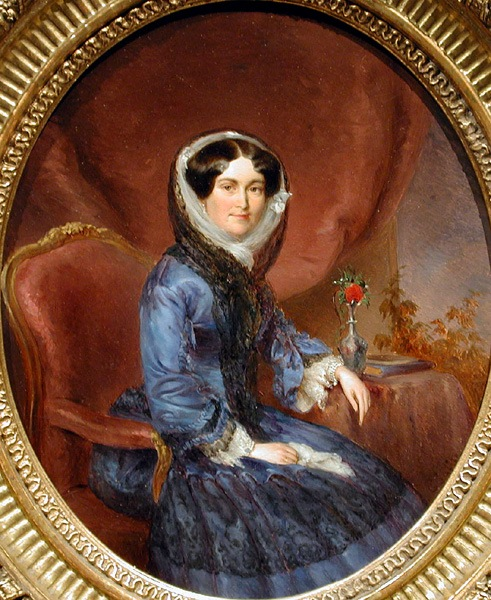
His wife, Princess Maria Theresia of Thurn and Taxis

In 1842 Paul returned to Hungary and became a member of the Conservative Party, which supported the Habsburg supremacy and did not favour the reform experiments. On 7 April 1848 he was appointed as Minister beside the King in the first cabinet of Hungary which was controlled by Count Lajos Batthyány. His role was as the mediator between Vienna and the Hungarian government. Seeing that his pacifying intentions ended in failure, he resigned from his position in September. Later Esterházy took connections with the immigrated politicians.

He was Minister besides the King during the Hungarian Revolution of 1848. At the time of the Napoleonic Wars, he worked for the Austrian Empire as a diplomat. He tried to form diplomatic associations for Vienna, (for example with the Kingdom of Saxony), but he did not achieve any results. Despite this failure, Esterházy remained a famous and acknowledged politician.

== Notes ==
Paul III Anton, Prince Esterházy House of Esterházy Born: 11 March 1786 Died: 21 May 1866
Hungarian nobility
Preceded by Nikolaus II	Prince Esterházy of Galántha; 25 November 1833 – 21 May 1866	Succeeded by Nikolaus III
Diplomatic posts
Preceded by Philipp von Neumann	Austrian Ambassador to the United Kingdom; 1815–1842	Succeeded by Philipp von Neumann
Political offices
Preceded by post created	Minister besides the King; 7 April – 9 September 1848	Succeeded by Kázmér Batthyány
