= Carlisle House, Soho =

Name of two mansions in Soho, London, England

Carlisle House was the name of two late seventeenth-century mansions in Soho, London, on opposite sides of Soho Square. One, at the end of Carlisle Street, is sometimes incorrectly said to have been designed by Christopher Wren; it was destroyed in the Blitz. The other was the location of Madame Cornelys' entertainments in the eighteenth century and was demolished in 1791; part of the site was cleared in 1891 for the building of St. Patrick's church.

== Carlisle House, Carlisle Street ==
This Carlisle House was on the west side of Soho Square, at the end of Carlisle Street. It was probably built between May 1685 and June 1687 by speculative builders, but is often incorrectly attributed to Christopher Wren in the 1660s for the Earls of Carlisle. It was a three-storey house of brown brick with stone band-courses separating the storeys and a triangular pediment ornamented with egg-and-dart moulding below and leaf moulding above. The railings in front were probably a later addition, and fine plasterwork had been added in about 1740 to the staircase and one of the rooms on the first floor.

The house's association with the Carlisles did not begin until 1717 or 1718, when the estranged wife of the third earl inherited it from her mother, the dowager Countess of Essex. Lady Carlisle rented it out from 1718 to 1724 to a James Vernon, possibly either the MP or his son, also an MP, and lived there herself from 1725 until she died in 1752. Her daughter rented it to Thomas Robinson, probably the Secretary of State, and then to the second Baron Chedworth.

In June 1756 the house was bought by John Delaval, later first Baron Delaval, and in March 1764, through a proxy, by Domenico Angelo, the Italian fencing and riding master. He built a riding school in the rear, took in pupils as boarders at 100 guineas (£105) a head, and made the house into London's pre-eminent school of arms and manners. However, he apparently left the house in the early 1780s and after that it was divided between numerous tenants, mostly in the arts, including a wood carver, an art restorer and several prominent painters. A Masonic lodge met in the ballroom. Charles Dickens is thought to have used the house as his model for the lodgings of Dr. Manette and his daughter Lucie in A Tale of Two Cities.

In 1860 it became a Home for Clerical, Medical and Law Students, managed by a Mrs. Whittaker, later known as Whittaker's Private Hotel. In 1873 it became an antique furniture warehouse. From 1899 onwards, a different antiques dealer leased it and redecorated much of the interior. In 1936, it became the offices of the British Board of Film Censors.

The house was destroyed in a World War II bombing raid on 10–11 May 1941, a full-moon night, killing the caretaker and his wife and the local air-raid warden, who had been having tea together. The site of the house was occupied by offices at numbers 10–12 Carlisle Street, built in 1959–60, until their replacement by the Nadler Soho hotel. On the site of the garden and later of the riding academy is Film House, the former headquarters of British Pathé.

== Carlisle House, Soho Square ==
The other Carlisle House was a large mansion on the east side of Soho Square, at the south corner of Sutton Street, with rear buildings on Sutton Street and in Hog Lane, now Charing Cross Road. This was the main house on the square. The first definitely known occupant of this house, in 1685, was Edward Howard, second Earl of Carlisle. While Lady Carlisle lived in the other Carlisle House, this one was the residence of her son, Lord Morpeth, who became the fourth Earl in 1738. There is rumoured to have been a tunnel between the two houses. In 1753, he sold it to an upholstery business, which used the stables and coach house in Hog Lane as their workshop and rented the house to the envoy of the King of Naples, who lived there from 1754 to 1758. An outbuilding on Sutton Street was made into a Catholic chapel for him and his staff. In summer 1759, three special Dutch envoys occupied the house.

In April 1760 it was rented for £180 a year to Teresa (or Theresa) Cornelys, an entertainer and courtesan born in either Vienna or Venice and mother of Casanova's daughter, who had used her married name, Pompeati, in her previous stay in London as an opera singer, and now called herself Madame Cornelys from the first name of her Rotterdam lover, Cornelis de Rigerboos. She made extensive renovations and extensions to the house, creating several sumptuously furnished rooms in the rear of the house along Sutton Street, in particular a concert-hall or ballroom 93 feet (28 m) long and 40 feet (12 m) wide with a supper-room underneath it 80 feet (24 m) long and 34 feet (10 m) wide and a "Chinese bridge" connecting the house proper to the new rooms. This may have been by Thomas Chippendale, who was one of her many creditors. She used the house to host sensational balls and masquerades, and beginning in 1771, also put on unlicensed operatic performances, for which she was fined. She was eventually arrested, imprisoned and declared bankrupt in 1772, after spending £5,000 in the previous five years alone. The assignees and a group of creditors agreed to offer up the house and its furnishings at auction in its entirety and to jointly bid up to £15,000, but the quick auction did not attract any other bidders and their agents were able to purchase it for £10,200; the other creditors were unsuccessful in trying to have the proceedings nullified. Until 1780, the owners attempted to revive the house's popularity for soirées, with some participation from Mrs. Cornelys but without success. They then announced an Academy of Sciences and Belles Lettres, with instruction for foreigners in 'the language, constitution and customs of England' and a Wednesday evening debate series called the School of Eloquence. The rooms continued to be advertised for hire for events, and were popular on Sundays, when few other venues were open.

By September 1783 the premises were advertised to let, and it was empty the following March. In June 1789 the music publisher Thomas Jefferys was occupying it, and the house was demolished in 1791. Madame Cornelys' main assembly rooms in Sutton Street remained; her salon became a Catholic chapel. The house itself was replaced by 1794 with two new houses facing the square; the southern one survives, but the northern was demolished in 1891 when St. Patrick's church was built.
