= Gaston de Fontenilliat =

French noble (1858–1925)

Charles Gaston de Fontenilliat, Count of Fontenilliat (Note: He is sometimes referred to as the Baron of Fontenilliat but more often as the Count of Fontenilliat.) (27 August 1858 – 30 May 1925) was a French nobleman, soldier, and businessman who married two American heiresses.

== Early life ==
Gaston was born on 28 August 1858 at Épinay-sur-Seine, a commune in the northern suburbs of Paris. He was a son of Baroness Anne Hélène Amélie Marie von Krüdener (1830–1859) and Arthur Jules Philippe, Count of Fontenilliat (1822–1900). His elder brother, Philippe de Fontenilliat, married Adrienne Espinasse, and his elder sister, Helene de Fontenilliat, married Constantin Linder, the wealthy Finnish Lord of Kytäjä. His father, a Knight of the Order of the Holy Sepulchre, served as Secretary to the French Legation in Sweden in 1853.

His paternal grandparents were Jules Philippe de Fontenilliat and Élisabeth Aimée Doyen (daughter of Baron Charles-François Doyen, Receiver-General of Finances of the Loire and Manche, and granddaughter of Jean Doyen, Garde du Corps of Charles IV, Duke of Lorraine). (Note: His great-great grandfather, Baron Jean Doyen, was ennobled on 14 October 1628 by Charles IV, Duke of Lorraine for military services. His great-grandfather, Baron Charles-François Doyen, had the title confirmed and added a knighthood, by Polish King Stanisław Leszczyński, who became Duke of Lorraine.) His maternal grandparents were Amélie von Lerchenfeld and Baron Paul Alexander von Krüdener, a nobleman of German Baltic descent who was the Russian Ambassador at the Court of the King of Sweden and Norway, who died of infarction in Stockholm in 1852. After his grandfather's death, Amélie married Count Nikolay Adlerberg in 1855 with whom she lived in Helsinki from 1866 to 1881 during Adlerberg's service as Governor-General of Finland. (Note: From his grandparents marriage, he had an uncle, Baron Nikolai Arthur von Krüdener. While still married to his grandfather, his grandmother had a child with Count Nikolay Adlerberg, his uncle Count Nikolai Adlerberg (b. 1848). After his grandfather's death in 1852, his grandmother married Count Nikolay Adlerberg.) His grandmother, a celebrated beauty, was herself the illegitimate daughter of Bavarian diplomat Maximilian-Emmanuel, Graf von und zu Lerchenfeld auf Köfering und Schönberg and Duchess Therese of Mecklenburg-Strelitz. (Note: When Gaston's grandmother Amélie von Lerchenfeld (1808–1888) was born, her mother Duchess Therese of Mecklenburg-Strelitz (a daughter of Charles II, Grand Duke of Mecklenburg and his first wife Princess Friederike of Hesse-Darmstadt.) was married to Karl Alexander, 5th Prince of Thurn and Taxis. After her birth, she carried the von Sternfeld surname, however, on 1 August 1823, the Grand Duke of Hesse gave the fifteen-year-old Amélie permission to carry the surname "von Lerchenfeld", but without rights to use the coat of arms or be listed in the family tree, which was the price for her extramarital birth.) (Note: Among his grandmother Amélie von Lerchenfeld's many first cousins were Prince Frederick of Prussia, Frederick William IV, King of Prussia, William I, German Emperor, Prince Charles of Prussia Alexandrine, Grand Duchess of Mecklenburg-Schwerin, Princess Louise of Prussia, Prince Albert of Prussia, Empress Alexandra Feodorovna (wife of Tsar Nicholas I), Charlotte, Princess of Württemberg, Joseph, Duke of Saxe-Altenburg, Therese, Queen of Bavaria, Louise, Duchess of Nassau, Georg, Duke of Saxe-Altenburg, Prince Eduard of Saxe-Altenburg, Frederica, Duchess of Anhalt-Dessau, Prince Carl of Solms-Braunfels and George V of Hanover.)

== Career ==
Fontenilliat served as a Second-Lieutenant in the 12th Chasseurs (also known as the Chasseurs de Champagne). Shortly after their marriage, he was forced to resign because "of a scandal created by a girl named Odette, who accused him of having borrowed money of her. She declared that he owed her $8,000" which his wife had to pay part of.

In New York, he served as director and secretary of the Journal of Useful Inventions Publishing Company, located at 744 Broadway. The president was Edgar de Valcourt-Vermont, Comte C. de Saint-Germain. In 1901, he was involved with his brother-in-law, William George Tiffany (a first cousin of Charles Lewis Tiffany), in the formation of the Phoenix and Eastern Railroad, a company that intended to build a railroad from Benson, Arizona to Phoenix, Arizona.

In 1902, while in Carbet, a suburb of Saint-Pierre, Martinique, Fontenilliat witnessed the 1902 eruption of Mount Pelée which killed 28,000 people. Along with Henri Marie, Comte de Fitz-James of Paris (second son of the 8th Duke of Fitz-James), he left the West Indies aboard the SS Caracas for New York City.

By 1914, Fontenilliat was on a mission for the French government during which he traveled to Texas after passing through New York City.

== Personal life ==
Fontenilliat was twice married. His first marriage was to Julia Florence Smith (1860–1905) in Paris on 22 December 1887. Julia was the youngest daughter of American merchant Murray Forbes Smith and Pheobe Ann (née Desha) Smith (eldest daughter of U.S. Representative Robert Desha). Among her siblings were Alva Erskine Smith, the first wife of William Kissam Vanderbilt (parents of Consuelo Spencer-Churchill, Duchess of Marlborough), and Mary Virginia Smith, the first wife of banker Fernando Yznaga (brother of Consuelo Montagu, Duchess of Manchester). After their marriage, they went to Brussels and then to London. Before their divorce in 1901, they were the parents of:

- Rene Gaston de Fontenilliat (1893–1946), who inherited half of the estate of his unmarried maternal aunt, Armide Vogel Smith; he married Emma Elesa Tourot in 1923.

After their bitter divorce Julia lived "in a magnificent villa at Maisons-Laffitte, near Paris" but died at the Bois-Colombes hospital in Paris on 4 August 1905, and was buried at Woodlawn Cemetery in the Bronx. Fontenilliat was in Russia when she died. He married, secondly, Mary Josephine (née Livingston) Blanc de Lanautte d'Hauterive (1854–1937) in Paris on 23 July 1913. Mary, a daughter of Mary Josephine (née Kernochan) Livingston of Eastnor Castle and Edward Louis Livingston (a direct descendant of Judge Robert Livingston), was the widow of Campbell Boyd, (Note: Campbell Boyd (1842–1894) was the son of John Christian Curwen Boyd and a nephew of Benjamin Boyd and Mark Boyd.) and Charles-Joseph Blanc, Vicomte de Lanautte d'Hauterive. (Note: Mary Josephine's second husband, the Vicomte de Lanautte d'Hauterive, was a son of Auguste Maurice Blanc de Lanautte d'Hauterive (nephew of Alexandre Maurice Blanc de Lanautte, Comte d'Hauterive), and was previously married to heiress Nora Davis (d. 1874), daughter of Thomas E. Davis, in 1873.)

He died in Paris in 1925. His widow died on 30 October 1937 in Monte Carlo. (Note: Mary Josephine Livingston (1859-1937) is buried in Pau, France along with her brother Edward McEvers "Mc E" Livingston (1857-1938) and his wife Sarah McAlpine Pollack (1858-1937).)
