= Maria Eichhorn (politician) =

German politician (born 1948)

Member of the Bundestag; from Bavaria
- In office 20 December 1990 – 27 October 2009
- Preceded by: Multi-member district
- Succeeded by: Peter Aumer
- Constituency: State list (1990–2002); Regensburg (2002–2009)

Personal details
- Born: Maria Hetzenegger; 11 September 1948 (age 77) Piesenkofen, Germany
- Party: Christian Social Union
- Children: 2
- Education: Regensburg University of Applied Sciences; University of Erlangen–Nuremberg

Maria Eichhorn (née Hetzenegger; born 11 September 1948) is a German politician (CSU) who served as a member of the Bundestag.

She was the CDU/CSU parliamentary group's Drugs Commissioner from 2006 to 2009.

== Life and career ==
After elementary school, Maria Eichhorn first completed an apprenticeship as a rural home economics assistant and then from 1967 to 1969 an apprenticeship as a bank clerk. During this time, she also attended the Berufsaufbauschule and then studied Business Administration at the Fachhochschule Regensburg, which she completed in 1973 as a Diplom-Betriebswirt (FH). She then worked as a specialist teacher for a year and began studying business education at Friedrich-Alexander-Universität Erlangen-Nürnberg in 1974, which she completed in 1977 as a Diplom-Handelslehrerin. From 1980 to 1990, she worked as a teacher at the commercial vocational school in Regensburg.

Maria Eichhorn is married and has two children.

== Political career ==
Maria Eichhorn joined the Junge Union in 1967 and the CSU in 1969. From 1992 to 2005 she was a member of the CSU party executive and from 1995 to 2005 state chairwoman of the Frauen-Union der Christsozialen. She has been deputy chairwoman of the CSU district association in Regensburg since 1987.

Maria Eichhorn was elected as a member of the district council of Landkreis Regensburg in 1972.

She was elected to the Bundestag in the 1990 election. From 1994 to 2005, she was chairwoman of the parliamentary group Family, Senior Citizens, Women and Youth and since 2006 has been the CDU/CSU parliamentary group's Commissioner for Drugs.

In 2002 and 2005, Maria Eichhorn was directly elected to the constituency of Regensburg and before that always via the state list Bavaria into the Bundestag. In the 2005 Bundestag election, she received 53.0% of the first vote in the Regensburg constituency.

In 2009, Maria Eichhorn no longer stood for a seat in the German Bundestag and therefore retired. Her successor as constituency representative is the CSU politician Peter Aumer.

== Public offices ==
From 1990 to 2002, Maria Eichhorn was deputy Landrätin of the Landkreis Regensburg.

Eichhorn is a member of the Central Committee of German Catholics (ZdK) and Bavarian state chairwoman of donum vitae.

The "Kulturverein Regensburger Domspatzen", of which she was also chairwoman, dissolved in January 2015, as the Bishopric had already prohibited the Domspatzen from accepting funds from this association years earlier. The reason for this was that, in the opinion of the diocese, Eichhorn's activities for Donum Vitae were not compatible with her chairmanship of the association.
