= Regensburg (electoral district) =

Federal electoral district of Germany

232 Regensburg
- Electoral district for the Bundestag
- Regensburg in 2025
- State: Bavaria
- Population: 340,200 (2019)
- Electorate: 250,692 (2025)
- Major settlements: Regensburg; Neutraubling; Hemau
- Area: 1,389.8 km^{2}

Current electoral district
- Created: 1949
- Party: CSU
- Member: Peter Aumer
- Elected: 2017, 2021, 2025

Regensburg is an electoral constituency (German: Wahlkreis) represented in the Bundestag. It elects one member via first-past-the-post voting. Under the current constituency numbering system, it is designated as constituency 232. It is located in southeastern Bavaria, comprising the city of Regensburg and the district of Landkreis Regensburg.

Regensburg was created for the inaugural 1949 federal election. Since 2017, it has been represented by Peter Aumer of the Christian Social Union (CSU).

== Geography ==
Regensburg is located in southeastern Bavaria. As of the 2021 federal election, it comprises the independent city of Regensburg and the entirety of the Landkreis Regensburg district excluding the Verwaltungsgemeinschaft of Wörth a.d.Donau.

== History ==
Regensburg was created in 1949. In the 1949 election, it was Bavaria constituency 22 in the numbering system. In the 1953 through 1961 elections, it was number 217. In the 1965 through 1972 elections, it was number 220. In the 1976 through 1998 elections, it was number 219. In the 2002 and 2005 elections, it was number 234. In the 2009 through 2021 elections, it was number 233. From the 2025 election, it has been number 232.

Originally, the constituency comprised the independent city of Regensburg and the Landkreis Regensburg district. It acquired its current borders in the 2021 election.

Election	No.	Name	Borders
1949	22	Regensburg	Regensburg city; Landkreis Regensburg district
1953	217	Regensburg	Regensburg city; Landkreis Regensburg district
1957	217	Regensburg	Regensburg city; Landkreis Regensburg district
1961	217	Regensburg	Regensburg city; Landkreis Regensburg district
1965	220	Regensburg	Regensburg city; Landkreis Regensburg district
1969	220	Regensburg	Regensburg city; Landkreis Regensburg district
1972	220	Regensburg	Regensburg city; Landkreis Regensburg district
1976	219	Regensburg	Regensburg city; Landkreis Regensburg district
1980	219	Regensburg	Regensburg city; Landkreis Regensburg district
1983	219	Regensburg	Regensburg city; Landkreis Regensburg district
1987	219	Regensburg	Regensburg city; Landkreis Regensburg district
1990	219	Regensburg	Regensburg city; Landkreis Regensburg district
1994	219	Regensburg	Regensburg city; Landkreis Regensburg district
1998	219	Regensburg	Regensburg city; Landkreis Regensburg district
2002	234	Regensburg	Regensburg city; Landkreis Regensburg district
2005	234	Regensburg	Regensburg city; Landkreis Regensburg district
2009	233	Regensburg	Regensburg city; Landkreis Regensburg district
2013	233	Regensburg	Regensburg city; Landkreis Regensburg district
2017	233	Regensburg	Regensburg city; Landkreis Regensburg district
2021	233	Regensburg	Regensburg city; Landkreis Regensburg district (excluding Wörth a.d.Donau Verwaltungsgemeinschaft)
2025	232	Regensburg	Regensburg city; Landkreis Regensburg district (excluding Wörth a.d.Donau Verwaltungsgemeinschaft)

== Members ==
The constituency has been held continuously by the Christian Social Union (CSU) since its creation. It was first represented by Max Solleder from 1949 to 1953, followed by Hermann Höcherl from 1953 to 1976. Albert Schedl then served from 1976 to 1980. Maria Eichhorn was representative from 2002 to 2009. Peter Aumer was elected in 2009 for one term, followed by Philipp Lerchenfeld. Aumer was elected again in 2017 and re-elected in 2021 and 2025.

Election	Member	Party	%
1949	Max Solleder	CSU	33.9
1953	Hermann Höcherl	CSU	57.0
1957	Hermann Höcherl	CSU	57.8
1961	Hermann Höcherl	CSU	58.3
1965	Hermann Höcherl	CSU	61.7
1969	Hermann Höcherl	CSU	61.6
1972	Hermann Höcherl	CSU	60.8
1976	Albert Schedl	CSU	64.5
1980	Benno Zierer	CSU	63.3
1983	Benno Zierer	CSU	64.7
1987	Benno Zierer	CSU	57.3
1990	Benno Zierer	CSU	55.0
1994	Benno Zierer	CSU	55.6
1998	Benno Zierer	CSU	52.7
2002	Maria Eichhorn	CSU	59.9
2005	Maria Eichhorn	CSU	53.0
2009	Peter Aumer	CSU	44.7
2013	Philipp Lerchenfeld	CSU	48.5
2017	Peter Aumer	CSU	40.1
2021	Peter Aumer	CSU	35.3
2025	Peter Aumer	CSU	38.3

== Election results ==
=== 2025 election ===
Federal election (2025): Regensburg
Notes:	Blue background denotes the winner of the electorate vote. Pink background denotes a candidate elected from their party list. Yellow background denotes an electorate win by a list member, or other incumbent. A ✓ or ✗ denotes status of any incumbent, win or lose respectively.						
Party	Candidate	Votes	%	±%	Party votes	%	±%
CSU	✓ Peter Aumer	80,980	38.3	▲2.9	75,587	35.7	▲4.8
AfD	Carina Schießl	37,931	17.9	▲9.5	39,743	18.8	▲10.0
Greens	Stefan Schmidt	27,691	13.1	▼2.3	28,292	13.4	▼2.8
SPD	Dr. Carolin Wagner	27,602	13.0	▼3.6	23,589	11.1	▼6.3
FW	Regina Christiane Seebauer-Sperl	11,195	5.3	▼3.8	10,440	4.9	▼3.5
Left	Sebastian Thomas Wanner	9,721	4.6	▲1.5	14,778	7.0	▲3.5
FDP	Ulrich Werner Maria Lechte	5,231	2.5	▼4.5	7,406	3.5	▼6.0
BSW	Irmgard Astrid Freihoffer	5,135	2.4		6,228	2.9	
Volt	Christian Andreas Matthias Kunz	2,170	1.0		1,665	0.8	▲0.6
APT	Christoph Hübner	2,039	1.0		1,405	0.7	▼0.3
ÖDP	Johannes Eberhardt	1,654	0.8	▼0.7	856	0.4	▼0.3
PARTEI					726	0.3	▼0.4
dieBasis					526	0.2	▼1.0
BP					232	0.1	▼0.4
BD	Dr. Anton Ludwig Beer	319	0.2		206	0.1	
Humanists					147	0.1	Steady
MLPD					32	0.0	Steady
Informal votes		757			567		
Total valid votes		211,668			211,858		
Turnout		212,425	84.7	▲4.6			
CSU hold	Majority	43,049	20.4	▲1.7			

=== 2021 election ===
Federal election (2021): Regensburg
Notes:	Blue background denotes the winner of the electorate vote. Pink background denotes a candidate elected from their party list. Yellow background denotes an electorate win by a list member, or other incumbent. A ✓ or ✗ denotes status of any incumbent, win or lose respectively.						
Party	Candidate	Votes	%	±%	Party votes	%	±%
CSU	✓ Peter Aumer	69,842	35.3	▼4.7	61,187	30.9	▼6.9
SPD	Carolin Wagner	32,850	16.6	▼0.2	34,563	17.4	▲2.9
Greens	Stefan Schmidt	30,333	15.3	▲5.9	32,094	16.2	▲5.8
FW	Rainer-Michael Rößler	17,906	9.1	▲2.6	16,618	8.4	▲4.2
AfD	Dieter Arnold	16,557	8.4	▼3.4	17,343	8.8	▼4.1
FDP	Ulrich Lechte	13,754	7.0	▲0.7	18,773	9.5	▲0.5
Left	Eva-Maria Schreiber	6,023	3.0	▼3.0	6,798	3.4	▼3.3
ÖDP	Robert Fischer	2,927	1.5	▼0.9	1,419	0.7	▼0.3
PARTEI	Romy Freund	2,734	1.4		1,485	0.7	▲0.1
dieBasis	Jörg Brunschweiger	2,567	1.3		2,526	1.3	
Tierschutzpartei					1,884	1.0	▲0.1
BP	Andreas Schambeck	1,745	0.9		963	0.5	▼0.2
Pirates					528	0.3	▼0.1
Volt					412	0.2	
Independent	Jakob Friedl	384	0.2				
Team Todenhöfer					335	0.2	
Unabhängige					243	0.1	
Humanists					196	0.1	
V-Partei3					189	0.1	▼0.1
Gesundheitsforschung					178	0.1	0.0
NPD					101	0.1	▼0.2
Bündnis C					85	0.0	
du.					82	0.0	
The III. Path					54	0.0	
LKR	Roland Gruber	90	0.0		51	0.0	
DKP					47	0.0	0.0
MLPD					21	0.0	0.0
Informal votes		1,225			762		
Total valid votes		197,712			198,175		
Turnout		198,937	80.2	▲1.5			
CSU hold	Majority	36,992	18.7	▼4.9			

=== 2017 election ===
Federal election (2017): Regensburg
Notes:	Blue background denotes the winner of the electorate vote. Pink background denotes a candidate elected from their party list. Yellow background denotes an electorate win by a list member, or other incumbent. A ✓ or ✗ denotes status of any incumbent, win or lose respectively.						
Party	Candidate	Votes	%	±%	Party votes	%	±%
CSU	Peter Aumer	78,858	40.1	▼8.4	74,720	37.8	▼10.6
SPD	Tobias Hammerl	32,862	16.7	▼5.3	28,582	14.5	▼4.8
AfD	Armin Bauer	23,275	11.8	▲8.2	25,625	13.0	▲8.9
Greens	Stefan Schmidt	18,343	9.3	▲1.0	20,332	10.3	▲1.1
FW	Tobias Gotthardt	12,922	6.6	▲2.0	8,374	4.2	▲0.2
FDP	Ulrich Lechte	12,254	6.2	▲2.2	17,719	9.0	▲4.4
Left	Irmgard Freihoffer	11,761	6.0	▲2.5	13,259	6.7	▲2.8
ÖDP	Hannes Eberhardt	4,599	2.3	▼0.1	1,949	1.0	▼0.5
Tierschutzpartei					1,704	0.9	▲0.1
BP					1,376	0.7	▼0.1
PARTEI					1,358	0.7	
Pirates	Katharina Graßler	1,656	0.8	▼1.2	777	0.4	▼1.6
NPD					422	0.2	▼0.5
DIE VIOLETTEN	Irene Garcia Garcia	359	0.2				
V-Partei³					340	0.2	
DiB					286	0.1	
DM					268	0.1	
Gesundheitsforschung					234	0.1	
BGE					232	0.1	
DKP					42	0.0	
BüSo					31	0.0	0.0
MLPD					31	0.0	0.0
Informal votes		1,891			1,119		
Total valid votes		196,889			197,661		
Turnout		198,780	78.6	▲9.5			
CSU hold	Majority	45,996	23.4	▼3.1			

=== 2013 election ===
Federal election (2013): Regensberg
Notes:	Blue background denotes the winner of the electorate vote. Pink background denotes a candidate elected from their party list. Yellow background denotes an electorate win by a list member, or other incumbent. A ✓ or ✗ denotes status of any incumbent, win or lose respectively.						
Party	Candidate	Votes	%	±%	Party votes	%	±%
CSU	Philipp Lerchenfeld	82,648	48.5	▲3.7	82,556	48.4	▲5.8
SPD	Karl Söllner	37,541	22.0	▲1.2	32,902	19.3	▲2.0
Greens	Florian Eckert	14,202	8.3	▼0.4	15,759	9.2	▼1.6
FW	Sebastian Hopfensperger	7,799	4.6		6,886	4.0	
FDP	Horst Meierhofer	6,830	4.0	▼8.8	7,835	4.6	▼9.0
AfD	Verena Brüdigam	6,229	3.7		7,000	4.1	
Left	Wolfgang Wittich	5,839	3.4	▼2.8	6,617	3.9	▼2.9
ÖDP	Claudia Wiest	4,184	2.5	▼0.2	2,571	1.5	▼0.1
Pirates	Jan Kastner	3,453	2.0	▲0.3	3,354	2.0	▼0.1
BP					1,320	0.8	▲0.1
NPD	Peter Haese	1,442	0.8	▼0.8	1,280	0.8	▼0.6
Tierschutzpartei					1,261	0.7	0.0
REP					475	0.3	▼0.4
Independent	Mühlbauer	393	0.2				
DIE FRAUEN					279	0.2	
DIE VIOLETTEN					213	0.1	▼0.1
Party of Reason					137	0.1	
PRO					103	0.1	
RRP					35	0.0	▼0.7
MLPD					33	0.0	0.0
BüSo					23	0.0	▼0.1
Informal votes		1,394			1,315		
Total valid votes		170,560			170,639		
Turnout		171,954	69.1	▼1.2			
CSU hold	Majority	45,107	26.5	▲2.6			

=== 2009 election ===
Federal election (2009): Regensburg
Notes:	Blue background denotes the winner of the electorate vote. Pink background denotes a candidate elected from their party list. Yellow background denotes an electorate win by a list member, or other incumbent. A ✓ or ✗ denotes status of any incumbent, win or lose respectively.						
Party	Candidate	Votes	%	±%	Party votes	%	±%
CSU	Peter Aumer	75,653	44.7	▼8.2	72,120	42.5	▼5.8
SPD	Karl Söllner	35,207	20.8	▼7.6	29,375	17.3	▼8.7
FDP	Horst Meierhofer	21,618	12.8	▲8.1	22,998	13.6	▲4.6
Greens	Jürgen Huber	14,784	8.7	▲2.5	18,343	10.8	▲2.3
Left	Richard Spieß	10,514	6.2	▲3.2	11,453	6.8	▲3.1
ÖDP	Claudia Wiest	4,410	2.6		2,772	1.6	
Pirates	Suat Kasem	2,903	1.7		3,566	2.1	
NPD	Karin Machner	2,753	1.6	0.0	2,297	1.4	0.0
Tierschutzpartei					1,316	0.8	
RRP	Ferdinand Frummet	1,227	0.7		1,171	0.7	
REP					1,100	0.6	0.0
BP					1,078	0.6	▼0.2
FAMILIE					1,037	0.6	▼0.3
DIE VIOLETTEN					430	0.3	
PBC					153	0.1	0.0
CM					129	0.1	
DVU					101	0.1	
BüSo					68	0.0	▼0.1
MLPD					40	0.0	0.0
Informal votes		1,933			1,455		
Total valid votes		169,069			169,547		
Turnout		171,002	70.3	▼6.0			
CSU hold	Majority	40,446	23.9	▼0.6			

=== 2005 election ===
Federal election (2005):Regensburg
Notes:	Blue background denotes the winner of the electorate vote. Pink background denotes a candidate elected from their party list. Yellow background denotes an electorate win by a list member, or other incumbent. A ✓ or ✗ denotes status of any incumbent, win or lose respectively.						
Party	Candidate	Votes	%	±%	Party votes	%	±%
CSU	✓ Maria Eichhorn	94,356	53.0	▼6.9	86,356	48.4	▼11.7
SPD	Joachim Wolbergs	50,566	28.4	▲1.1	46,510	26.1	▲1.0
Greens	Jürgen Mistol	11,152	6.3	▲0.8	15,210	8.5	▲0.3
FDP	Horst Meierhofer	8,392	4.7	▲1.0	15,999	9.0	▲5.3
Left	Horst Vogt	5,309	3.0	▲2.1	6,463	3.6	▲2.9
NPD	Willi Wiener	2,819	1.6		2,488	1.4	▲1.1
Familie					1,664	0.9	
BP					1,483	0.8	▲0.6
REP					1,129	0.6	▲0.2
BüSo					188	0.1	▲0.1
GRAUEN					406	0.2	▲0.2
Feminist					372	0.3	▲0.1
PBC					184	0.1	0.0
MLPD					61	0.0	
Informal votes		2,468			2,079		
Total valid votes		178,124			178,513		
Turnout		180,592	76.4	▼4.5			
CSU hold	Majority	43,790	24.6				
