= Peter Aumer =

German politician (born 1976)

Peter Aumer MdB
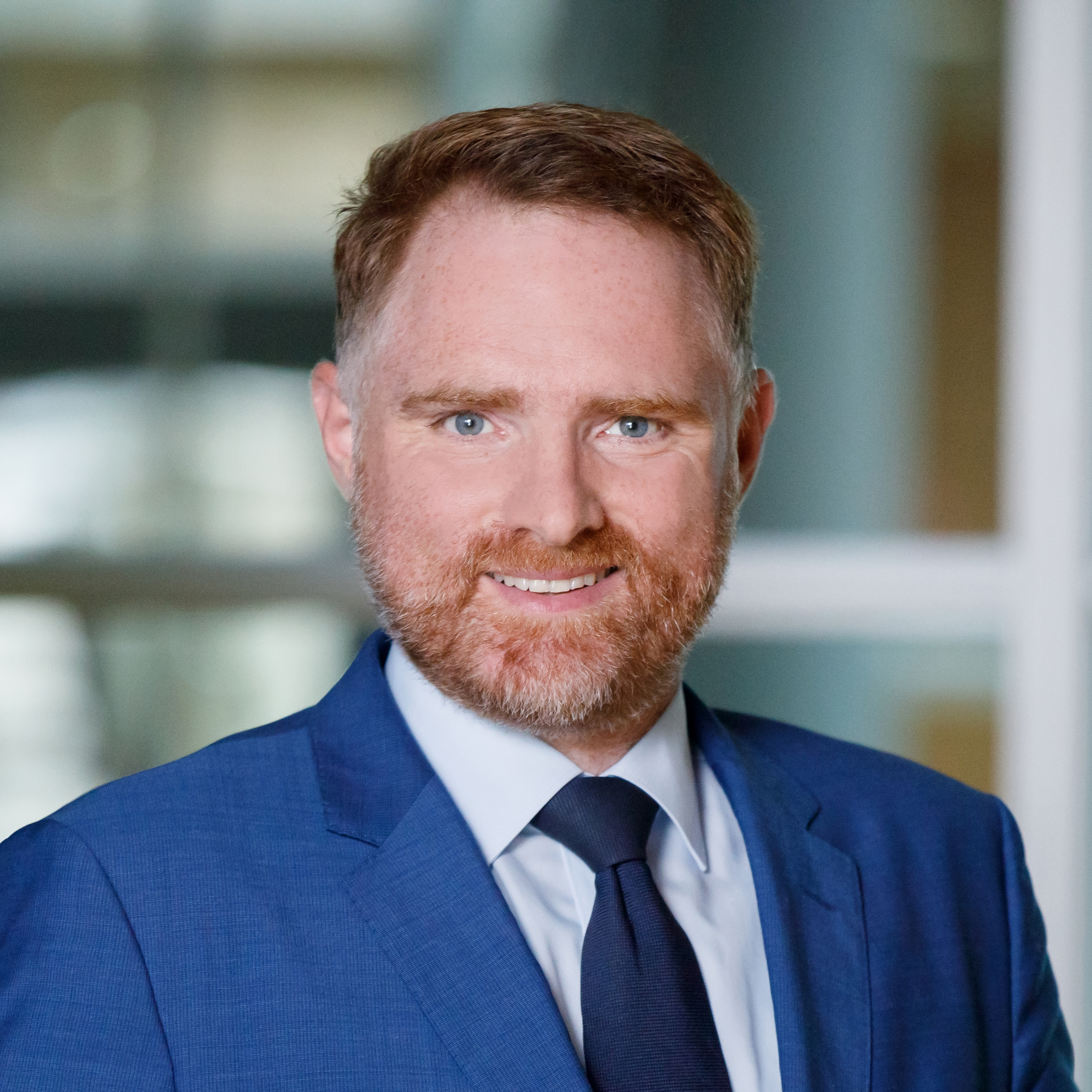
- Aumer in 2018

Member of the Bundestag; for Regensburg
- Incumbent
- Assumed office 24 October 2017
- Preceded by: Philipp Graf Lerchenfeld
- In office 27 October 2009 – 22 October 2013
- Preceded by: Maria Eichhorn
- Succeeded by: Philipp Graf Lerchenfeld

Personal details
- Born: 17 April 1976 (age 50) Regensburg, West Germany
- Party: Christian Social Union
- Education: Regensburg University of Applied Sciences

Peter Aumer (born 17 April 1976 in Regensburg) is a German politician of the Christian Social Union in Bavaria (CSU) who has served as member of the Bundestag for Regensburg in the state of Bavaria from 2009 till 2013 and since 2017.

== Life and career ==
After completing his education, Aumer completed vocational training as a tax assistant at the Regensburg Technical College. He then studied business administration at the Regensburg University of Applied Sciences. He completed his studies with a degree in business administration (FH) and then worked professionally in tax consulting and auditing. While working, he pursued a master's degree at the Weihenstephan University of Applied Sciences, which he completed with a Master of Business Administration (MBA). He works in tax consulting, auditing and at an energy supply company.

== Political career ==
=== Entry into politics (1996–2002) ===
His political career began in 1996 when he joined the Junge Union and the CSU. From 1998 to 2009, he was the local chairman of the JU Regenstauf. After initially being an assessor and acting local chairman, he was elected chairman of the Ramspau CSU local branch in 2000 and held this position until 2011. In 2001, he was elected deputy chairman of the Regenstauf CSU community association. He took on his first political mandate after the local elections in the spring of 2002 as a market town councillor in Regenstauf. He was initially a member of the finance and economic committee and councillor of the wastewater association in Regental. Since then, he has also held a mandate in the Regensburg district council.

=== Various board positions (2003–2009) ===
Since 2003, Aumer has been a member of the board of the CSU district association Regensburg-Land and an assessor and delegate to the district and state party conferences. In the spring of 2008, he was re-elected to the Regenstauf market town council.

From 2009 to 2013, he was deputy chairman of the CSU district council group in Regensburg and chairman from 2013 to 2017. On 6 May 2008, he was elected third mayor of the Regenstauf market and retained this position until 2010. On 12 June 2008, he became chairman of the CSU community association in Regenstauf. On 28 February 2009, he was elected as the CSU's direct candidate for the Regensburg federal constituency as the successor to Maria Eichhorn, who was no longer running. At the CSU Upper Palatinate district party conference on 29 May 2009, he was elected to the district executive committee.

=== First entry into the Bundestag (2009–2014) ===
After the 2009 federal election, he entered the German Bundestag as a direct candidate for the first time as a member of the Bundestag with 44.8% of the first votes in the Regensburg constituency. In the 17th German Bundestag, he was a member of the parliamentary advisory board for sustainable development and secretary. In 2011, he was elected chairman of the CSU Regensburg-Land district association.

In 2014, he ran in the local elections in Bavaria for district administrator of the Regensburg district. On 7 June 2013, the almost 200 delegates unanimously elected Aumer as the CSU's district administrator candidate for the local elections on 16 March 2014. In the second round of voting on 30 March 2014, he was defeated in the runoff against Tanja Schweiger from the Free Voters.

=== Re-election to the Bundestag (2016–present) ===
On 26 November 2016, Aumer was elected as the CSU's direct candidate for the Bundestag constituency of Regensburg for the second time after 2009 by 81 of the 159 delegates eligible to vote and was therefore just ahead of Astrid Freudenstein with 78 votes. The incumbent direct representative, Philipp Graf von und zu Lerchenfeld, withdrew his announced candidacy during the nomination meeting. He also became the top candidate on the CSU's state list for the Bundestag. Aumer became a member of the Bundestag again in the 2017 German federal election. He won 40.05% of the first votes in the Regensburg federal constituency and thus the direct mandate in the constituency. He is a member of the Committee for Labour and Social Affairs and the Subcommittee on Disarmament, Arms Control and Non-Proliferation. He has been a market town councillor in Regenstauf again since 2020.

In the 2021 federal election, he was able to defend his direct mandate with 35.3% of the first votes. He is also member of the ASEAN Parliamentary Group.

== Memberships ==
Aumer is a member of the non-partisan European Union Germany, which advocates for a federal Europe and the European unification process. He is also a volunteer member of the coordination council for the railway expansion between Hof and Obertraubling for Deutsche Bahn Netz AG. He was chairman of the Ramspau Volunteer Fire Department. Until September 2022, he was a volunteer member of the board of trustees of the Catholic Academy for Professions in Health and Social Services in Bavaria.

== Personal life ==
Aumer is Roman Catholic and single.
