= Technische Hochschule =

Type of university in Germany

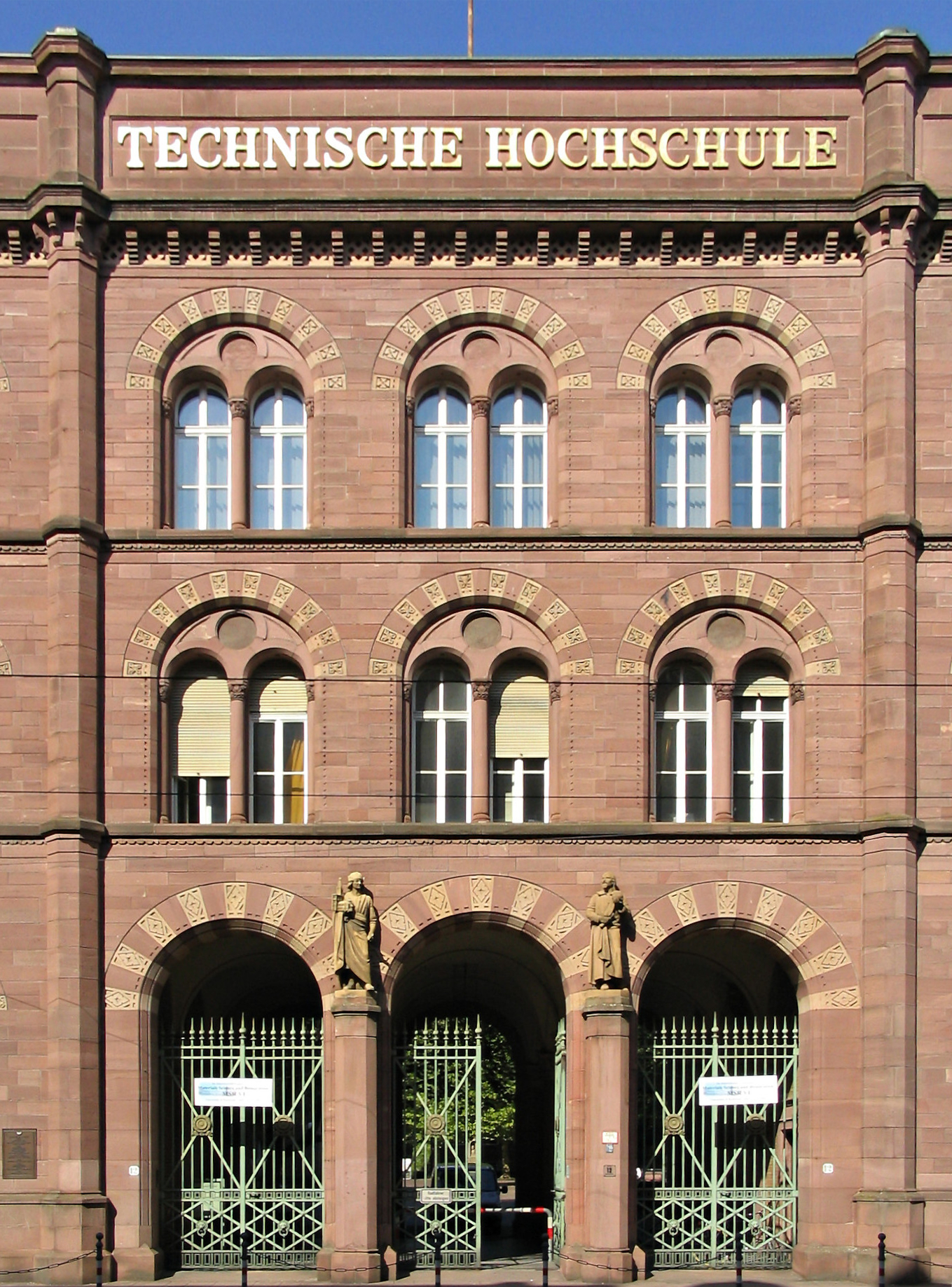
University of Karlsruhe, a German technical university founded in the 19th century. Since 2009 it has been named Karlsruhe Institute of Technology.

A Technische Hochschule (German: [ˌtɛçnɪʃə ˈhoːxˌʃuːlə], plural: Technische Hochschulen, abbreviated TH) is a type of university focusing on engineering sciences in Germany. Previously, it also existed in Austria, Switzerland, the Netherlands (Technische Hogeschool), and Finland (teknillinen korkeakoulu, teknisk högskola). In the 1970s (in Germany) and the 1980s (in the Netherlands), the Technische Hochschule emerged into the Technische Universität (German) or Technische Universiteit (Dutch). Since 2009, several German universities of applied sciences were renamed as Technische Hochschulen.

== Terminology ==
In German-language countries, the term Hochschule is more general than Universität (plural: Universitäten) and also encompasses universities which do not have the right to confer doctorates and habilitations, in contrast to Universitäten. Today, Universitäten as well as other Hochschulen call themselves Technische Hochschule for historical reasons. However, a Technische Hochschule with the status of a Universität is regarded as a Technische Universität despite the name.

== History ==
Since the Middle Ages, higher education institutions in Europe were called a university only if a certain classical canon of subjects encompassing philosophy, medicine, law and theology was taught. When engineering sciences became more important in academica due to the Industrial Revolution, institutions of tertiary education devoted to these were denied the prestigious denomination "university", and had to use the more general term Hochschule instead.

It was a major breakthrough, then, when in the first half of the 20th century, some Technische Hochschulen in Germany and Technische Hogescholen in the Netherlands were given the right to award the doctoral degrees, and again later when they were allowed to call themselves universities. This change of status was accompanied by a broader spectrum of academic disciplines and more fundamental research.

While most former Technische Hochschulen opted to change their name to Technische Universität to reflect their new status, some of them preferred to maintain their traditional and established names, most notably the RWTH Aachen University in Germany as well as ETH Zurich and EPF Lausanne in Switzerland.

Starting in 2009, several German universities of applied sciences (Fachhochschulen) with a technical focus have changed their names to Technische Hochschule.

== In Austria ==
List of Austrian Technische Universitäten by location:

Institution	Established	City	State	Staff	Students
Technische Universität Graz	1811	Graz	Styria	2,256	12,692
Technische Universität Wien	1815	Vienna	Vienna	4,078	26,218

== In Finland ==
The concept of a TH exists also in Finland as teknillinen korkeakoulu, which is equivalent to a TH. Examples include Teknillinen korkeakoulu in Espoo, Tampereen teknillinen korkeakoulu and Lappeenrannan teknillinen korkeakoulu. Similarly to German-speaking countries, most of them later changed their name to teknillinen yliopisto, which is equivalent to a TU. However, Teknillinen korkeakoulu retained its old name until it merged with two other universities to form the current Aalto University.

== In Germany ==
List of German Technische Universitäten by location:

Institution	Established	City	State	Staff	Students
Brandenburgische Technische Universität Cottbus-Senftenberg	2013	Cottbus and Senftenberg	Brandenburg	1,218	10,310
HafenCity Universität Hamburg	2006	Hamburg	Hamburg	504	2,304
Karlsruher Institut für Technologie	2009	Karlsruhe	Baden-Württemberg	9,251	22,146
Leibniz Universität Hannover	1831	Hanover	Lower Saxony	4,290	22,236
Rheinisch-Westfälische Technische Hochschule Aachen	1870	Aachen	North Rhine-Westphalia	8,047	40,025
Rheinland-Pfälzische Technische Universität Kaiserslautern-Landau	2023	Kaiserslautern and Landau	Rhineland-Palatinate	1,124+	14,184+
Technische Universität Bergakademie Freiberg	1765	Freiberg	Saxony	1,540	5,455
Technische Universität Berlin	1879	Berlin	Berlin	8,302	31,427
Technische Universität Braunschweig	1745	Braunschweig	Lower Saxony	5,550	15,500
Technische Universität Chemnitz	1836	Chemnitz	Saxony	1,185	10,850
Technische Universität Clausthal	1775	Clausthal-Zellerfeld	Lower Saxony	1,000	4,080
Technische Universität Darmstadt	1877	Darmstadt	Hesse	4,122	24,305
Technische Universität Dortmund	1968	Dortmund	North Rhine-Westphalia	3,867	29,672
Technische Universität Dresden	1828	Dresden	Saxony	7,094	36,534
Technische Universität Hamburg	1978	Hamburg	Hamburg	1,150	6,678
Technische Universität Ilmenau	1953	Ilmenau	Thuringia	2,021	6,909
Technische Universität München	1868	Munich	Bavaria	8,351	52,000
Technische Universität Nürnberg	2021	Nuremberg	Bavaria	20	106
Universität Stuttgart	1829	Stuttgart	Baden-Württemberg	4,946	27,686

TU9 is the alliance of nine leading universities of technology in Germany with the following institutions as members: Karlsruhe Institute of Technology, Leibniz University Hannover, RWTH Aachen, TU Berlin, TU Braunschweig, TU Darmstadt, TU Dresden, TU Munich, University of Stuttgart.

List of Technische Hochschulen (institutions with the status of Technische Universität not included) by location:

Institution	Established	Renamed Technische Hochschule	City	State	Staff	Students
Ostbayerische Technische Hochschule Amberg-Weiden	1994	2013	Amberg, Weiden	Bavaria	325	3,500
Ostbayerische Technische Hochschule Regensburg	1971	2013	Regensburg	Bavaria	690	11,000
Technische Hochschule Aschaffenburg	1995	2019	Aschaffenburg	Bavaria	?	3,374
Technische Hochschule Bingen	1971	2016	Bingen am Rhein	Rhineland-Palatinate	212	2,628
Technische Hochschule Brandenburg	1992	2016	Brandenburg an der Havel	Brandenburg	240	2,616
Technische Hochschule Deggendorf	1994	2013	Deggendorf	Bavaria	552	5,700
Technische Hochschule Georg Agricola	1816	2016	Bochum	North Rhine-Westphalia	252	2,279
Technische Hochschule Ingolstadt	1994	2013	Ingolstadt	Bavaria	450	5,200
Technische Hochschule Köln	1971	2015	Cologne	North Rhine-Westphalia	1,620	24,818
Technische Hochschule Lübeck	1969	2018	Lübeck	Schleswig-Holstein	441	4,689
Technische Hochschule Mittelhessen	1971	2010	Giessen, Friedberg, Wetzlar	Hesse	1,000	16,044
Technische Hochschule Nürnberg	1971	2013	Nuremberg	Bavaria	1,855	12,234
Technische Hochschule Ostwestfalen-Lippe	1971	2019	Lemgo, Detmold, Höxter	North Rhine-Westphalia	715	6,544
Technische Hochschule Rosenheim	1971	2018	Rosenheim	Bavaria	500	5,901
Technische Hochschule Ulm	1960	2019	Ulm	Baden-Württemberg	120 professors	4,125
Technische Hochschule Wildau	1991	2009	Wildau	Brandenburg	335	4,152
Technische Hochschule Würzburg-Schweinfurt	1971	2023	Würzburg, Schweinfurt	Bavaria	795	9,322

== In Switzerland ==
List of Swiss Federal Institutes of Technology by location:

Institution	Established	City	Staff	Students
École Polytechnique Fédérale de Lausanne	1853	Lausanne	4,000	9,000
Eidgenössische Technische Hochschule Zürich	1855	Zürich	10,242	17,781

== In the Netherlands ==
List of Universities of Technology (Technische Universiteiten) in the Netherlands:

Institution	Established	City	Staff	Students
Delft University of Technology	1842	Delft	7,265	26,424
Eindhoven University of Technology	1956	Eindhoven	3,200	12,926

4TU is the federation of the four Dutch universities of technology with the following institutions as members: Delft University of Technology (TU Delft), Eindhoven University of Technology (TU/e), University of Twente (UT), and Wageningen University & Research (WUR).

== See also ==
- TU9 German Institutes of Technology e. V.
- List of universities in Germany
