= Amalie Adlerberg =

German noblewoman (1808–1888)

Amalie Maximilianovna Adlerberg
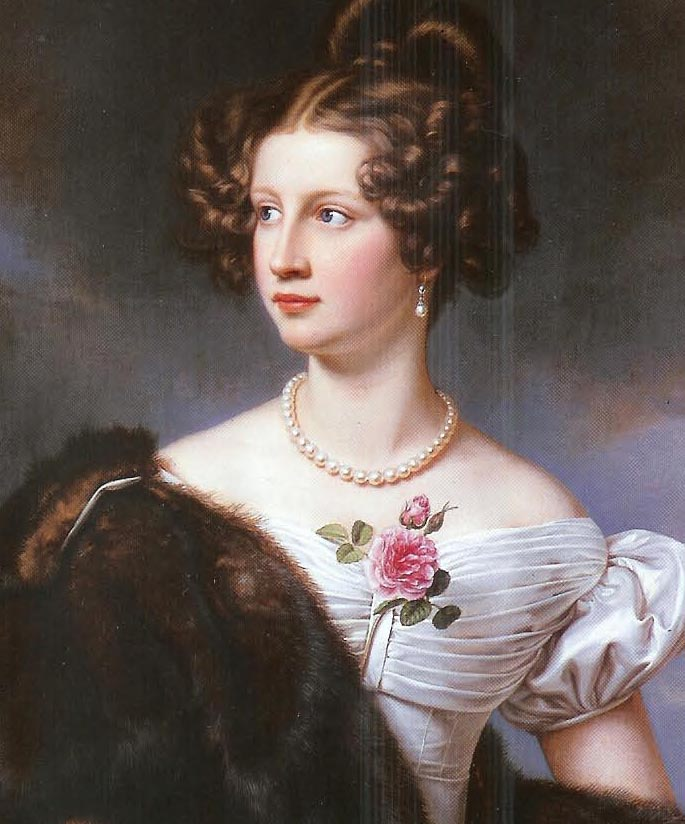
- Portrait by Joseph Stieler, 1828
- Born: Amalie von Sternfeld; 16 June 1808
- Died: 21 June 1888 (aged 80); Tegernsee, Bavaria
- Buried: Church of St. Laurentius in Rottach-Egern am Tegernsee
- Noble family: Lerchenfeld
- Spouses: Baron Alexander von Krüdener (m. 1825; died 1852) Count Nikolay Adlerberg (m. 1855)
- Issue: Nikolai-Arthur von Krüdener; Marie von Krüdener; Nikolo Adlerberg
- Father: Count Maximilian-Emmanuel von Lerchenfeld
- Mother: Duchess Therese of Mecklenburg-Strelitz

Countess Amalie Maximilianovna Adlerberg (16 June 1808, Regensburg – 21 June 1888, Tegernsee) was an illegitimate daughter of Duchess Therese of Mecklenburg-Strelitz, fathered by Bavarian diplomat Maximilian-Emmanuel Graf von und zu Lerchenfeld auf Köfering und Schönberg (1772–1809). Duchess Therese had had an affair with the Bavarian diplomat while her husband Karl Alexander, 5th Prince of Thurn and Taxis, was in Paris for several years at the invitation of Napoleon. Amalie's mother was an aunt of Empress Alexandra Feodorovna, wife of Tsar Nicholas I.

Her mother's husband, Karl Alexander Fürst von Thurn und Taxis (1770–1827), was invited by Napoleon for his new projects, and lived in Paris for years. In his absence, Princess Therese had a passionate affair with Count Maximilian-Emmanuel von Lerchenfeld (1772–1809). After the death of her father, Graf von Lerchenfeld, on 19 October 1809, Amalie was placed in the care of Therese's "von Sternfeld" relatives in Darmstadt (then in the Grand Duchy of Hesse), and the baby carried their surname after she was born. Amalie von Sternfeld was later brought to Regensburg, closer to Princess Therese, and changed her surname to "Stargard". She was finally taken care of by the Lerchenfeld family and lived in their palace in Munich or at the family castle in Köfering near Regensburg. Finally, on 1 August 1823, the Grand Duke of Hesse gave the fifteen-year-old Amalie Stargard permission to carry the surname "von Lerchenfeld", but without rights to use the coat of arms or be listed in the family tree, which was the price for her extramarital birth.

== Youth ==
In 1822, the fifteen-year-old beauty Amalie Stargard met young Fyodor Tyutchev, supernumerary attaché of the Russian diplomatic mission, who arrived from Saint Petersburg. Nineteen-year-old Tyutchev fell in love and the two young people shared tender romantic feelings. Tyutchev's poem Tears or Slyozy (Russian: Люблю, друзья, ласкать очами …) coincides with one of their dates, and was most likely dedicated to Amalie. Among other poems inspired by Amalie are K N. and I Remember the Golden Time…

=== First marriage ===
Coat of arms of Barons von Krüdener

The blooming Amalie caught the attention of the first secretary of the Russian diplomatic representatives, Baron Alexander von Krüdener (1786–1852). The old diplomat was of German Baltic descent, and the young but pragmatic princess opted for a baron's noble title rather than the untitled young poet Tyutchev. The letters and diaries of Count Maximilian Joseph von Lerchenfeld illuminate Tyutchev's first years as a diplomat in Munich (1822–26), giving details of his frustrated love affair for Amalie, nearly involving a duel with his colleague (on 19 January 1825). On 31 August 1825 the seventeen-year-old Amalie von Lerchenfeld wed Baron Krüdener in Köfering.

Her first child, Nikolai-Arthur, was born on 2 July [O.S. 20 June] 1826.

=== Tyutchevs and Krüdeners ===
The Tyutchevs and Krüdeners continued to frequent the same diplomatic society, they were nearly next-door neighbors with the Tyutchevs living at Karolinenplatz 1, and the Krüdeners a five-minute walk away on Briennerstrasse 15. Fyodor Tyutchev continued to see Amalie, but in families. Prince Karl, brother of King Ludwig I of Bavaria, and the king himself were spellbound by the beautiful Amalie. Ludwig I ordered an oil portrait of Amalie to the artist Joseph Stieler for his Gallery of Beauties. It was completed in 1828 and today can be viewed at Nymphenburg Palace in Munich.

In April 1836, Fyodor Tyutchev dedicated to Amalie his poem I Remember the Golden Time…. This poem is not about love, but a reminiscence of love, of their past meetings on the hills of Regensburg. The poem was later interpreted by Mieczysław Weinberg, in Opus 25: Six Romances after F. Tutchev for singer and piano (1945) in the romance of the same name.

== Russian high society ==
In April 1836, Baron von Krüdener received a promotion and left for Russia. Amalie brought to Saint Petersburg a bunch of Tyutchev's poems (more than 100). She gave dozens more of them to the poet's former colleague, Prince Ivan Gagarin. Gagarin wrote down several poems and gave them to read to Alexander Pushkin, publisher of Sovremennik, the most influential literary magazine in Russia. Pushkin was very excited and published them immediately. Thus, Amalie helped Tyutchev gain recognition in his home country.

Bibliographers of Pushkin like Alexander Shik state that Alexander Pushkin felt for Amalie and tried to court her at one of the balls. Natalia Pushkina, one of the most beautiful women in Russia, had to "have a talk" with her husband, after which the poet was joking that "Madonna has a heavy hand…"

Count Alexander von Benckendorff was another passionate admirer of Baroness Amalie von Krüdener. Her influence was so great that he even secretly converted to Catholicism. In Imperial Russia, where Orthodoxy was the state religion, this action would be punished by years of katorga (the secret was revealed only after death of Benckendorff). He also helped to reinstate Fyodor Tyutchev at the Ministry after he was fired in 1843, and arranged the meeting of Tyutchev with Nicholas I of Russia and Minister Karl von Nesselrode. His Majesty Nicholas I of Russia himself was not indifferent to Amalie; 25 November 1836 she received a luxurious fur coat as a gift from the Tsar that she received on the rights of his cousine.

== Marriage to Adlerberg ==
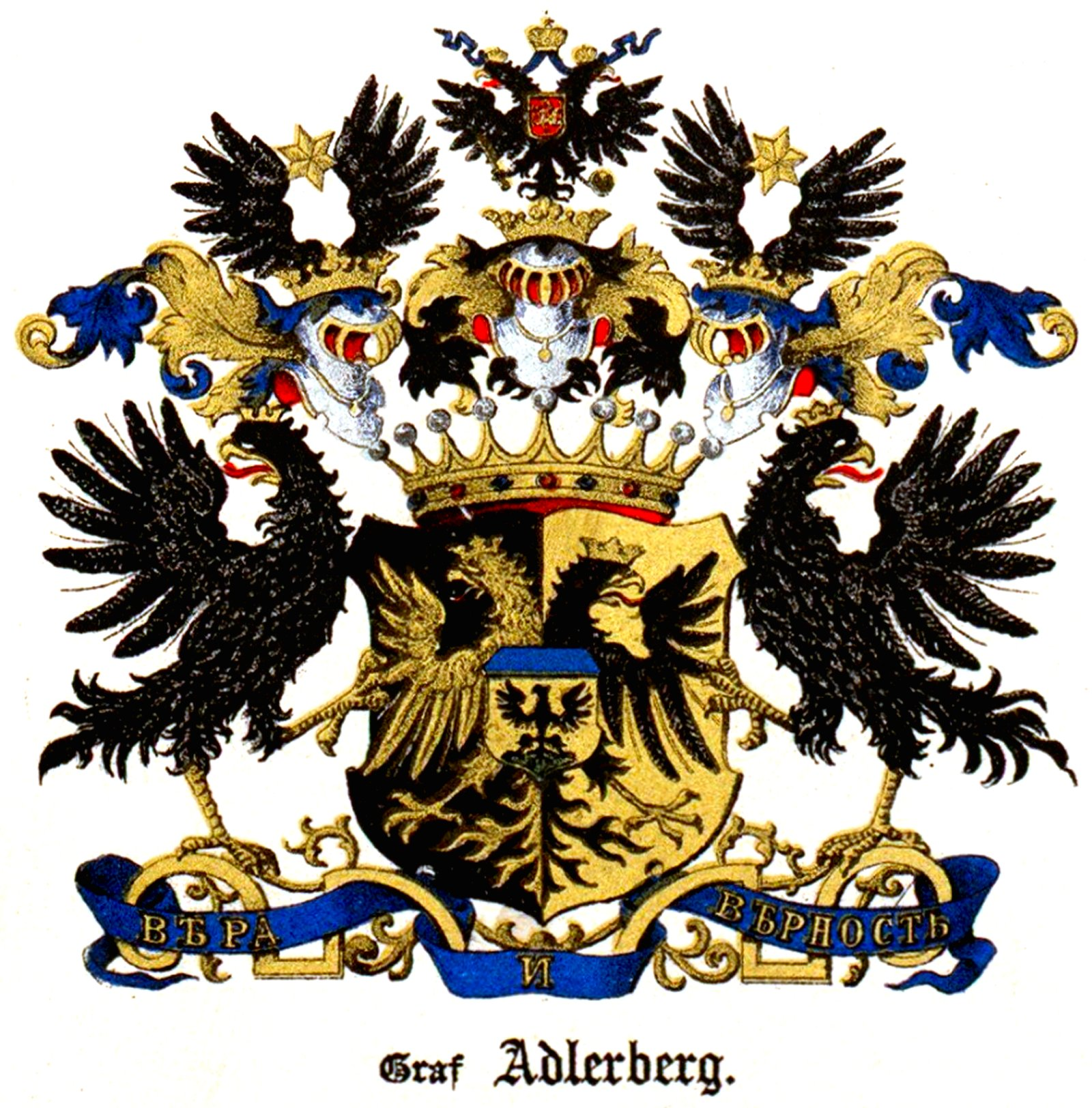
Coat of arms of Counts Adlerberg

In 1848, the 40-year-old Amalie von Krüdener gave birth to a child out-of-wedlock on 17 March. The father of her newborn son Nikolo was the 29-year-old Count Nikolay Adlerberg, member of the noble Adlerberg family. The child received the status of the adoptive son of Nikolai Veniavsky.

Baron von Krüdener was appointed Ambassador and Plenipotentiary Minister at the Court of the King of Sweden and Norway, but Amalie pretended to be ill and stayed in Saint Petersburg. They never met again, as Baron von Krüdener died of infarction in Stockholm in 1852. Amalie finally found love, peace and happiness with Count Nikolay Adlerberg, whom she married officially in 1855.

=== Orphanage in Simferopol ===
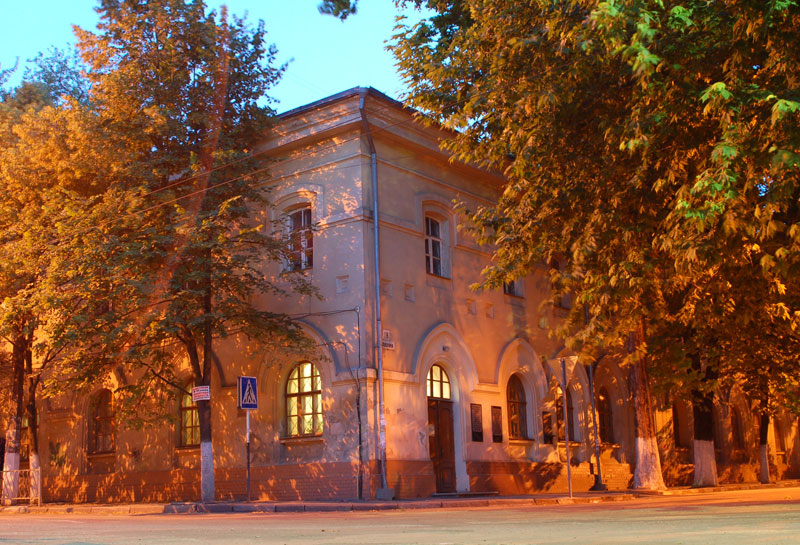
Building of the Adlerberg Orphan-asylum in Simferopol

During the Crimean War, Nikolay Adlerberg served as Governor-General of Simferopol and Taurida Governorate in 1854–56. The war actions aggravated the situation of children in Crimea as many lost their parents and had no relatives or anywhere to go. The children were brought to Simferopol during the Siege of Sevastopol (1854) along with wounded soldiers. Simferopol's city council had been trying to open an orphan-asylum since 1848, but there were always some problems due to lack of money or necessary documents. Taking into consideration the circumstances, Countess Adlerberg decided to avoid bureaucratic formalities and on 31 December 1854 opened an asylum for fourteen orphans with her own money.

In 1857, the Committee of the Board of Guardians of Orphan-asylums (Russian: Комитет Главного Попечительства Детских Приютов) approved the transformation of the temporary orphan-asylum founded by Countess Adlerberg into the asylum working on regular basis. It was also named after Amalie Adlerberg. In 1869, the Amalie Adlerberg Orphan-asylum moved into a new building. In a letter to Governor of Simferopol Grigory Zhukovsky, Empress Maria Alexandrovna insisted that the asylum retain the name of its founder, in contrast to other asylums across Russia, that were all named after Maria Alexandrovna. The building of the asylum is still there at the crossing of Pushkinskaya and Gogolevskaya streets and it now houses the Museum of Ethnography of Crimean Nations.

=== Years in Helsinki ===
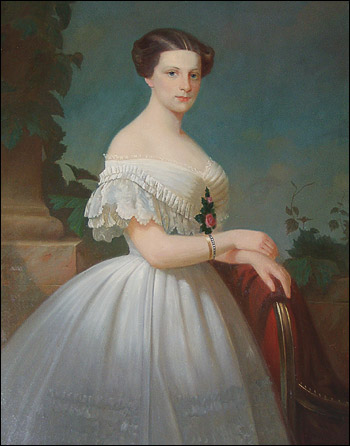
Amalie Adlerberg (1865)

In 1866–81 Amalie lived in Helsinki, during Nikolay Adlerberg's service as Governor-General of Finland.

As a Catholic, Countess Adlerberg helped to establish the Roman Catholic parish and their cathedral in Helsinki, a project earlier decisively contributed by countess Leopoldina von Berg, née di Cicogna di Mozzone, the Italian wife of previous governor-general, field marshal Friedrich Wilhelm Rembert von Berg. Another grandson was Gaston de Fontenilliat.

In 1873, the countess managed to arrange her granddaughter (Helene de Fontenilliat, born 1855) to marry Constantin Linder, the wealthy lord of Kytäjä, who had recently lost his first wife, countess Marie Musin-Pushkin. Helene gained a stepson, the later-notorious wastrel Hjalmar Linder of Mustio, and soon gave birth to her own child.

=== Last years in Munich ===
In 1881, after the assassination of Alexander II of Russia, Count and Countess Adlerberg moved for permanent residence to Munich, Germany. They had no house and first stayed at Maximilian Lerchenfeld's house on Amalienstrasse 93. Later, the Adlerbergs acquired a plot of land and built a home in the town of Tegernsee on Schwaighofstrasse 2.

Amalie died in Tegernsee on 21 June 1888. She was buried in the cemetery of the Church of St. Laurentius in Rottach-Egern am Tegernsee. The church is situated on the shore of the lake opposite the Amalie's mansion known under the name of "Haus Adlerberg am See".

== Sources ==
- a novel by the Russian author Yelena Arsenyeva dedicated to Adlerberg and Tytchev
- Amalie Adlerberg at web portal "Famous Women" (in Russian)
- Web Site of the Crimean Ethnographical Museum (formerly Adlerberg Orphan-Asylum)
- РОССИЙСКИЕ ДИПЛОМАТЫ БАРОНЫ КРЮДЕНЕРЫ – КОЛЛЕГИ Ф.И. ТЮТЧЕВА
- Я помню время золотое...(С. А. Долгополова)
- Симферопольский детский приют графини Адлерберг // Крым. – 1893. – 29 окт
- Салгир В. Приют гр. Адлерберг в Симферополе / В. Салгир. – 1903. – 17 янв.
- Салгир В. Детский приют гр. Адлербергов / В. Салгир. – 1902. – 20 авг.
- Маркевич А.И. Симферопольский детский приют имени графини А. М. Адлерберг (к шестидесятилетию существования):Краткий исторический очерк / А. И. Маркевич. – Симферополь, 1915. – 71 с.
