= Philipp Graf Lerchenfeld =

German politician (1952–2017)

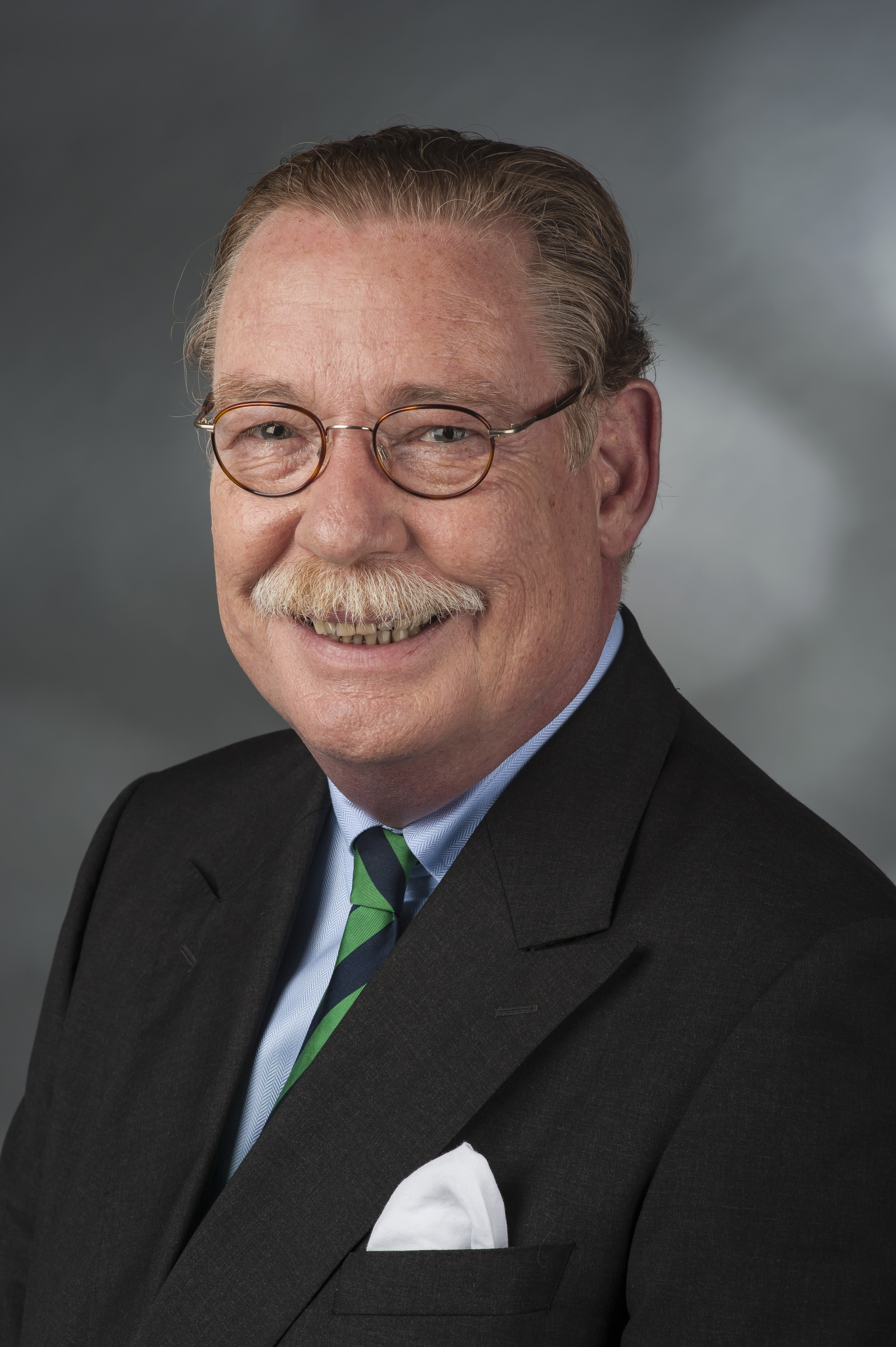
- Lerchenfeld in 2014

Member of the Bundestag; for Regensburg
- In office 22 October 2013 – 24 October 2017
- Preceded by: Peter Aumer
- Succeeded by: Peter Aumer

Member of the Landtag of Bavaria
- In office 6 October 2003 – 8 October 2013
- Preceded by: Multi-member district
- Succeeded by: Constituency abolished
- Constituency: Upper Palatinate (2003–2008); Regensburg-Land, Schwandorf (2008–2013)

Personal details
- Born: Philipp Graf von und zu Lerchenfeld; 25 May 1952 Köfering, West Germany
- Died: 1 December 2017 (aged 65) Köfering, Germany
- Party: Christian Social Union
- Spouse: Marie Therese
- Relatives: Lerchenfeld family
- Education: TU Munich
- Occupation: Politician, farmer, accountant, tax consultant

Philipp Graf von und zu Lerchenfeld (25 May 1952 – 1 December 2017) was a German politician for the Christian Social Union in Bavaria (CSU). He worked in both regional and national politics, most notably being member of the Landtag of Bavaria from 2003 to 2013 and then serving as a member of the Bundestag from 2013 to 2017.

== Early life and education ==
Lerchenfeld was born on 25 May 1952 in Köfering into the ancient Lerchenfeld noble family and was related to the 1920s Bavarian Prime Minister Hugo Graf von und zu Lerchenfeld auf Köfering und Schönberg. Lerchenfeld visited the Köfering Volksschule from 1958 to 1962 and then the Albrecht-Altdorfer-Gymnasium in Regensburg from 1962 to 1972. From 1972 to 1973 he completed his military service, with the mountain troops in Reichenhall and Mittenwald from 1973 to 1977 he studied agricultural sciences at the Technical University of Munich-Weihenstephan.

== Career ==
Outside of politics, he was a farmer, accountant and tax consultant.

Lerchenfeld owned an agricultural estate. He worked as a tax consultant from 1982 and as an auditor from 1984. From 1989 to 2003 he thus worked for a agency in Regensburg. Later, throughout his career he held high positions in many entities such as:

- Bayerische Treuhandgesellschaft AG
- Krones
- Association of Bavarian Landowners.
- Regensburg diocese
- Bavarian Business Association
- University of Regensburg
- Regensburg Centre for Interventional Immunology

== Political career ==
Lerchenfeld was elected to the local council of Köfering in 1990, and the district council of Regensburg in 2002.

In the 2003 Bavarian state election, he was elected into the Bavarian State Parliament, where he was a member of the Committee on Economic Affairs, Infrastructure, Transport and Technology from 2003 to 2008. In the 2008 election, he was re-elected and worked as a member of the Committee on State Budget and Financial Affairs and was the financial policy spokesman for the CSU parliamentary group until 2013.

By coincidence, in 2013 there were both a Bavarian state election and a German Federal Election. He chose to run for the latter and successfully won the Regensburg Electoral District with 48.5% of the vote. In September 2017, he did not seek re-election.

Lerchenfeld died due to lung cancer on 1 December 2017 in Köfering, at the age of 65. At his funeral, he was honored for being "Noble, conscientious and philanthropic". Among many other designations Köfering's mayor Armin Dirscherl emphasised that Lerchenfeld was a Köferinger who made great efforts for the good of the village. Among the notable guests were Rudolf Voderholzer and Franz von Bayern.

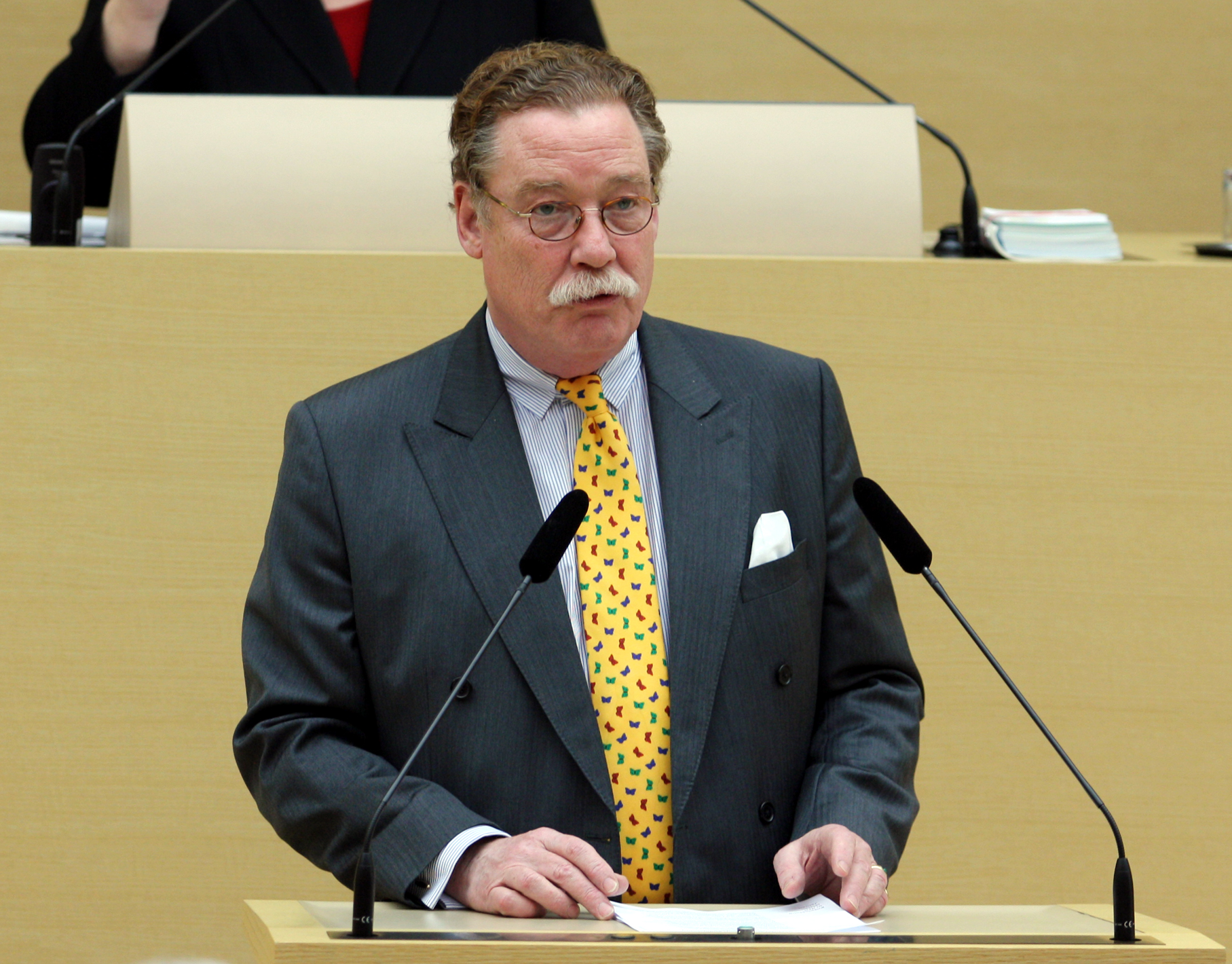
Lerchenfeld in the Bavarian State Parliament (2012)

Lerchenfeld introducing himself for Wikipedia (in German)

== Personal life ==
A Roman Catholic, he was married Marie Therese, born Countess Ambrózy of Seden and Remete from a Hungarian comital family. He left behind his adopted son Christopher Count Lerchenfeld.
