= Murray Forbes Smith =

American commission merchant

Murray Forbes Smith (July 21, 1814 – May 4, 1875) was an American commission merchant best known as the father of Alva Belmont.

== Early life ==
Smith was born on July 21, 1814, in Dumfries, Virginia. He was a son of Edinburgh born George Smith (1765–1822) and Delia (née Forbes) Smith (1780–1841). who married in 1799. His sister, Anne Amelia Smith, was the second wife of James Innes Thornton, the Secretary of State of Alabama from 1824 to 1834. Two other sisters were Mary Virginia Smith, who married Dr. Philip Lightfoot (and lived at "Morven Plantation") and Sally Innes Smith, who married Col. George Bullock Willis (and lived at "Ben Lomond" in Greene County, Alabama). His brother, George Alexander Smith, a merchant and tobacco manufacturer, was the father of Murray Forbes Smith, a Mississippi State Representative and Senator.

His maternal grandfather was Dr. David Forbes, a surgeon on the Revolutionary War who came to Dumfries from Scotland in the 1770s.

== Career ==
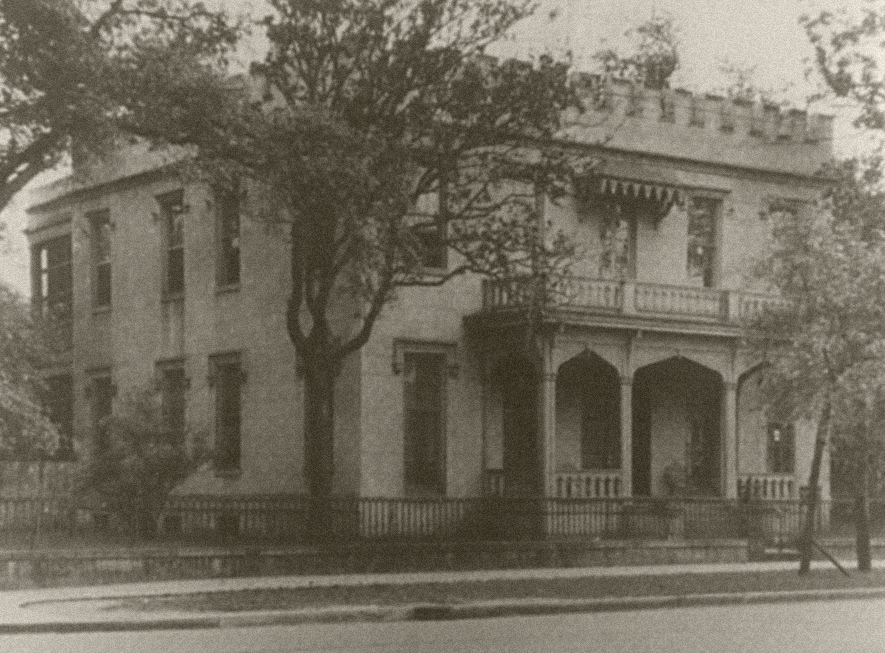
The Murray Forbes Smith House at 201 Government Street in Mobile, Alabama.

Smith began his career as a lawyer but soon went into the cotton business in Mobile, Alabama, upon the suggestion of his father-in-law. He became very successful and the family summered in Newport, Rhode Island, and went on European vacations. Around 1859, the Smith family moved North to New York City shortly before the Civil War and settled in Madison Square. After Abraham Lincoln was assassinated in 1865, New York was no longer safe for Southerners so the Smiths moved to Europe where he worked as a cotton broker in the north of England at Liverpool. His wife and children lived near Paris, where his daughter Alva attended boarding school in Neuilly, France. In 1869, the family returned to Alabama, but the South was still in reconstruction and Smith was unable to get his business successfully restarted so they again moved to New York. During the difficult 1870s, they lived in a modest house on 44th Street and he was a member of the New York Cotton Exchange.

He was an investor in the Toledo, Peoria and Western Railway.

== Personal life ==
Smith married Pheobe Ann Desha (1821–1871), the elder daughter of U.S. Representative from Tennessee Robert Desha and Eleanor "Nellie" (née Shelby) Desha. Phoebe's uncle was also a U.S. Representative and Kentucky governor Joseph Desha. Together, they were the parents of:

- Desha Smith (1842–1888), who died in Geneva, Switzerland.
- Murray Forbes Smith (1844–1857), who died young.
- Alice Smith (1845–1847), who died young.
- Armide Vogel Smith (1847–1907), who died unmarried in New York City; she was president of the Orphanage of the Church of the Holy Trinity of the City of New York.
- Alva Erskine Smith (1853–1933), who married William Kissam Vanderbilt, a son of William Henry Vanderbilt and grandson of Cornelius Vanderbilt, in 1875. They divorced in 1895 and she married Oliver Belmont, a son of August Belmont, in 1896. They remained married until his death in 1908.
- Mary Virginia Smith (1856–1926), who married banker Fernando Yznaga, brother of Consuelo Montagu, Duchess of Manchester, in 1880. They divorced in 1886, and she married William George Tiffany of Baltimore (a nephew of Mrs. August Belmont and first cousin of Charles Lewis Tiffany) in 1888 and moved to Maisons-Laffitte near Paris (before their eventual divorce in 1903).
- Julia Florence "Mimi" Smith (1860–1905), who married Gaston de Fontenilliat in 1887.

Smith died in New York City on May 4, 1875. The flag at the Cotton Exchange was displayed at half-mast following his death in his honor.

=== Descendants ===
Through his daughter Alva, he was posthumously a grandfather of Consuelo Vanderbilt (first wife of Charles Spencer-Churchill, 9th Duke of Marlborough), William Kissam Vanderbilt II, and Harold Stirling Vanderbilt. Through his daughter Alva, he is an ancestor of the 10th, 11th and 12th Dukes of Marlborough.
