= Hopkins L. Turney =

American politician (1797–1857)

Hopkins Lacy Turney
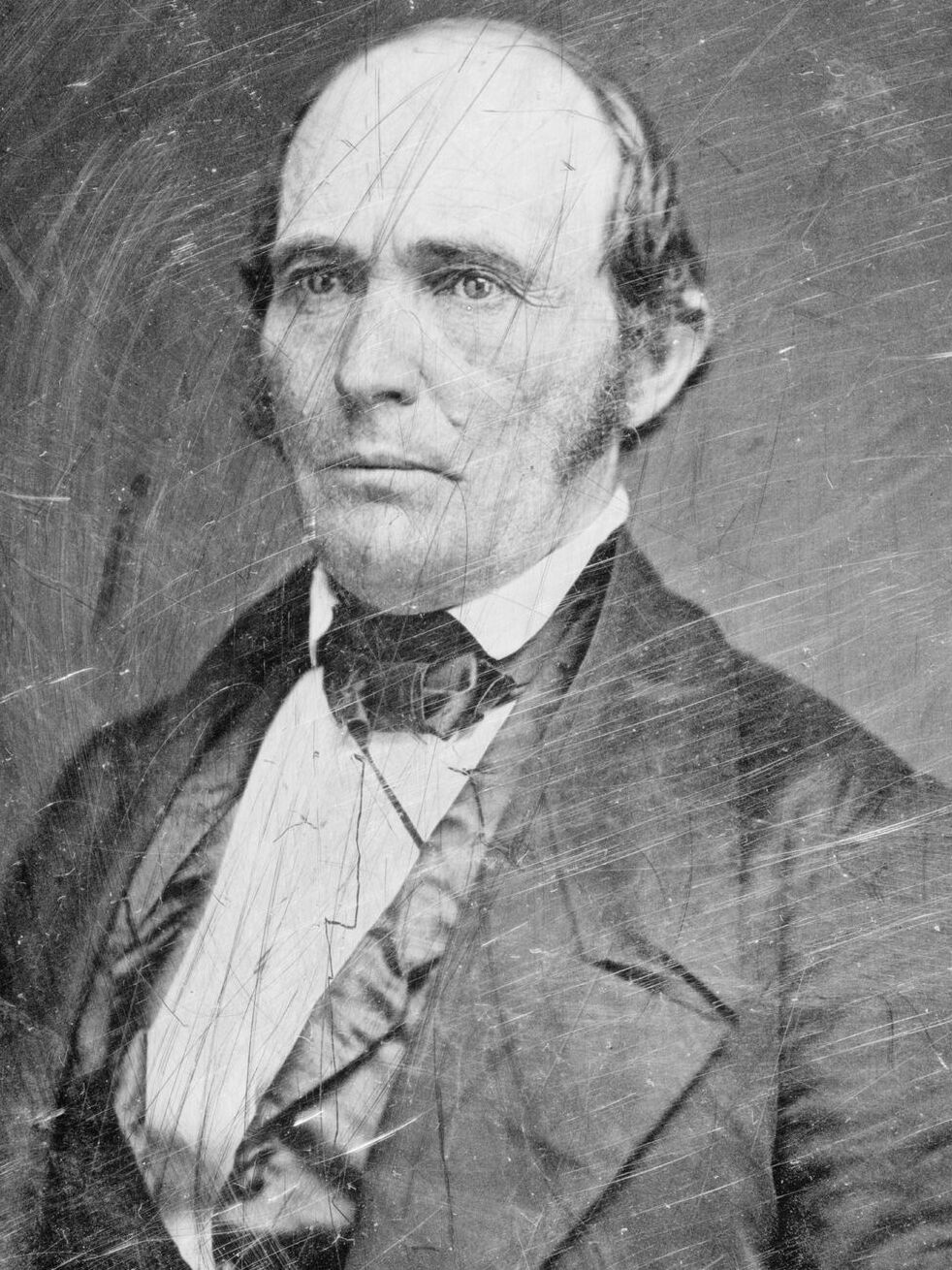

United States Senator from Tennessee
- In office March 4, 1845 – March 3, 1851
- Preceded by: Ephraim H. Foster
- Succeeded by: James C. Jones

Member of the U.S. House of Representatives from Tennessee's 5th district
- In office March 4, 1837 – March 3, 1843
- Preceded by: John B. Forester
- Succeeded by: George W. Jones

Member of the Tennessee House of Representatives
- In office 1828

Personal details
- Born: October 3, 1797 Smith County, Tennessee, U.S.
- Died: August 1, 1857 (aged 59) Winchester, Tennessee, U.S.
- Party: Democratic
- Profession: Politician, Lawyer

Hopkins Lacy Turney (October 3, 1797 – August 1, 1857) was a Democratic U.S. representative and United States senator from Tennessee.

== Biography ==
Turney was born in the Smith County settlement of Dixon Springs, Tennessee. As a youth, he was apprenticed to a tailor. He served in the Seminole War in 1818. Subsequent to this he studied law, and passed the bar examination and began a practice in Jasper, Tennessee. Later he moved to Winchester, Tennessee, continuing the practice of law. He owned slaves. He was first elected to the Tennessee House of Representatives in 1828.

He married Teresa Francis, the daughter of Miller Francis and Hannah Henry, in 1826. She was born December 9, 1809, and died September 5, 1879. Hopkins and Teresa were the parents of nine children.

Their son Peter Turney (September 22, 1827 – October 19, 1903) was Chief Justice of the Tennessee Supreme Court from 1870 to 1893; and served as governor of the U.S. state of Tennessee from 1893 to 1897.

He was then elected to the U.S. House, serving three terms in that body from 1837 to 1843, the 25th through 27th Congresses. Subsequent to this he was elected by the Tennessee General Assembly to the U.S. Senate, returning to Washington, D.C., after a two-year hiatus and serving one six-year term in that body, where he was chairman of the United States Senate Committee on Retrenchment for four years and the U.S. Senate Committee on Patents and the Patent Office for two before returning to his law practice, which he engaged in until shortly before his death. He is buried in Winchester.

== Notes ==
U.S. House of Representatives
Preceded by John B. Forester	Member of the U.S. House of Representatives from Tennessee's 5th congressional district March 4, 1837 – March 3, 1843	Succeeded by George W. Jones
U.S. Senate
Preceded by Ephraim H. Foster	U.S. senator (Class 1) from Tennessee; March 4, 1845 – March 3, 1851; Served alongside: Spencer Jarnagin and John Bell	Succeeded by James C. Jones
