= John B. Forester =

American politician

Member of the U.S. House of Representatives from Tennessee's 5th district
- In office March 4, 1833 – March 3, 1837
- Preceded by: William Hall
- Succeeded by: Hopkins L. Turney

Personal details
- Born: McMinnville, Tennessee
- Died: August 1, 1845
- Party: Jacksonian Anti-Jacksonian
- Profession: lawyer; politician

John B. Forester (1785 - August 1, 1845) was an American politician who represented Tennessee's fifth district in the United States House of Representatives.

== Biography ==
Forester was born in McMinnville, Tennessee. Although he received limited schooling, he studied law. He was admitted to the bar, and practiced law, as one of the early lawyers of Warren County, Tennessee.

== Career ==
Forester was elected as a Jacksonian to the Twenty-third Congress and re-elected as an Anti-Jacksonian candidate to the Twenty-fourth Congress. He served from March 4, 1833 to March 3, 1837.

== Death ==
Forester died on August 1, 1845. The place he was interred is unknown.

U.S. House of Representatives
Preceded by William Hall	Member of the U.S. House of Representatives from Tennessee's 5th congressional district 1833-1837	Succeeded by Hopkins L. Turney
