= Fernando Yznaga =

Cuban American banker

- Born: Fernando Alfonso Yznaga del Valle; October 16, 1850; New York City, New York, U.S.
- Died: March 6, 1901 (aged 50); New York City, New York, U.S.
- Education: Lawrence Scientific School; Louisiana Law School
- Occupation: Banker
- Employer: H. B. Hollins & Co.
- Spouses: Mary Virginia Smith (m. 1880; div. 1886) Mabel Elizabeth Wright (m. 1890; div. 1895)
- Parent(s): Antonio Modesto Yznaga del Valle; Ellen Maria Clement
- Relatives: Consuelo Montagu, Duchess of Manchester (sister); William Montagu, 9th Duke of Manchester (nephew)

Fernando Alfonso Yznaga del Valle (October 16, 1850 – March 6, 1901) was a Cuban American banker who was one of the best-known men of New York and foreign society and club life. Described as "one of the most entertaining of men, very clever at epigram and repartee, and famous for quaint sayings. His life had been adventurous and, from a domestic point of view, somewhat of a stormy nature."

== Early life ==
Yznaga was born in New York on October 16, 1850. He was the oldest of four children, and only son, born to merchant diplomat Antonio Modesto Yznaga del Valle (1823–1892) and Ellen Maria (née Clement) Yznaga (1833–1908). His father was from an old Cuban family who owned a large plantation (Torre Iznaga) and sugar mills in the vicinity of Trinidad, Cuba; they had connections to several Spanish aristocratic families. In addition to plantations in Cuba and Louisiana, his parents owned properties in New York City and Newport, Rhode Island. Among his siblings was Consuelo Yznaga (who married George Montagu, 8th Duke of Manchester in 1876), Natica Yznaga (who married Sir John Lister-Kaye, 3rd Baronet in 1881) and Emilie Yznaga (who never married).

His maternal grandfather, Samuel Clement, was a steamboat captain who owned Ravenswood Place, a plantation in Concordia Parish, Louisiana, which his mother inherited upon their death. Through his sister Consuelo, he was uncle to William Montagu, 9th Duke of Manchester and two nieces, known as May and Nell, who both died of consumption before marrying. He was with his sister in Davos when her youngest daughter, Lady Alice (Nell), died. Reportedly, he "never seemed a very strong man since then," and it was said that "his constitution had never recovered from the long, nervous strain which he went through at that time."

He was graduated from the Lawrence Scientific School at Harvard, before returning south and earning an LL.D. degree from Louisiana Law School while at his families plantation near Lake Concordia in Louisiana, where they were all well known in New Orleans society.

== Career ==
After his eldest sister's marriage to the Duke of Manchester, he came to New York City. After his first marriage to a sister-in-law of William Kissam Vanderbilt, he was reportedly gifted a seat on the New York Stock Exchange and entered the firm of H. B. Hollins & Co. at 15 Wall Street, a close friend of Vanderbilt's and J. Pierpont Morgan. Yznaga was "an excelled businessman" and made his fortune at the firm, working there for twenty years until his death in 1901. The firm, which was organized in 1878, went bankrupt on November 13, 1913.

Even after his divorce from Jennie, he remained close friends with Vanderbilt and was frequently aboard his yacht, the Valiant. Yznaga, Vanderbilt and Winfield Hoyt were referred to as the "Three Vanderbilt Musketeers" as they were always seen together. He was a member of the Union Club, the Tuxedo Club, the County Club, the Manhattan Club, the Athletic Club, the Meadow Brook Hunt Club, and one of the original members of the Metropolitan Club in 1891, where he lived.

== Personal life ==
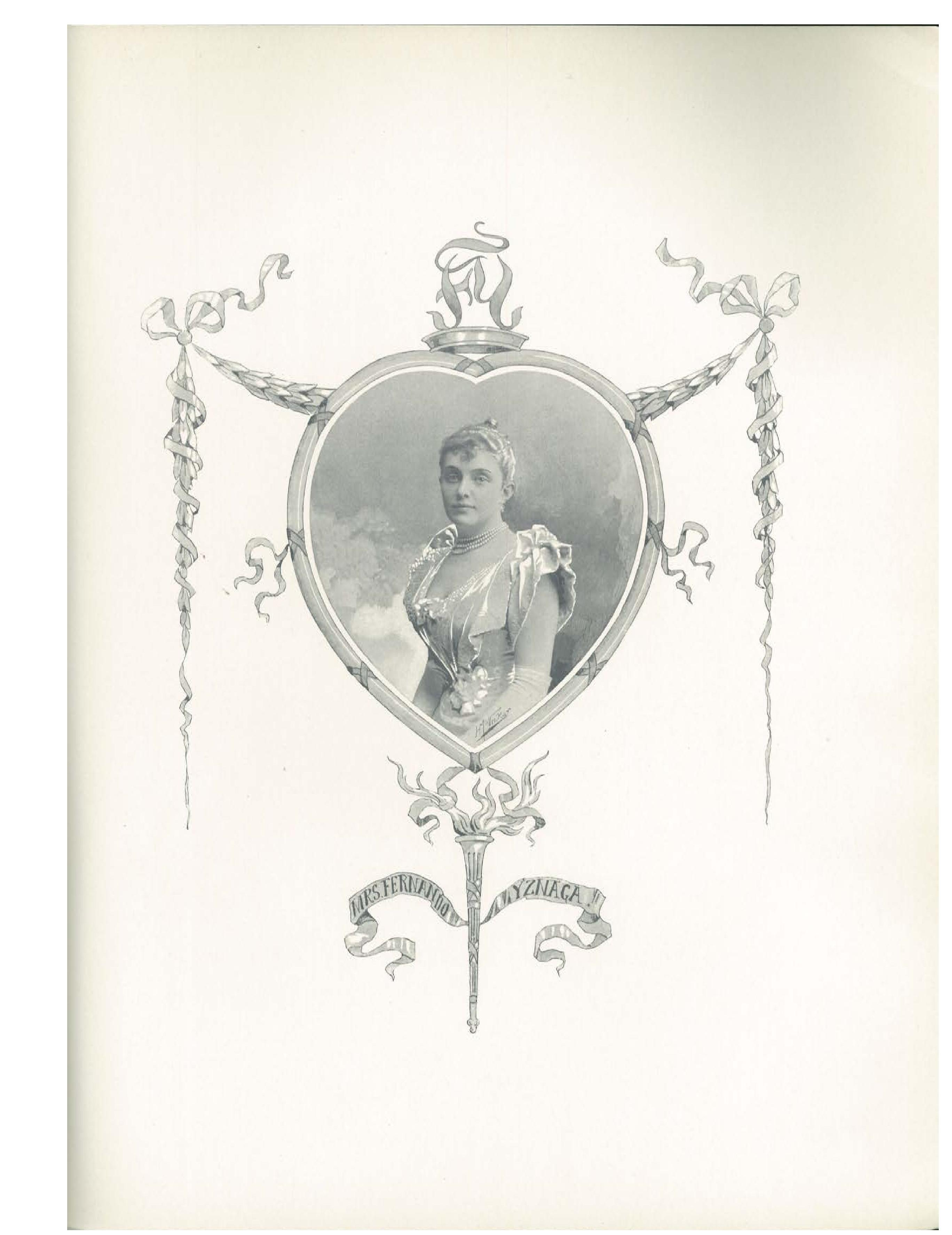
Mrs. Fernando Yznaga, née Miss Mabel Wright, of New York, c. 1894.

On September 22, 1880, Yznaga was married to Mobile, Alabama-born Mary Virginia "Jennie" Smith (1856–1926), sister of Alva (née Smith) Vanderbilt at the Vanderbilt home in Oakdale on Long Island. They were daughters of Murray Forbes Smith, a commission merchant, and Phoebe Ann (née Desha) Smith (daughter of U.S. Representative Robert Desha). After their divorce in 1886, Jennie remarried to William George Tiffany of Baltimore (the son of William M. Tiffany who was a first cousin of Charles Lewis Tiffany) (Note: William George Tiffany of Baltimore (1844-1905) is sometimes confused with his younger cousin, Rough Rider William George Tiffany (1863-1898) of Newport, the son of his uncle George Tiffany and Isabella Bolton Perry, a sister of Mrs. August Belmont Jr. Caroline Slidell Perry.) in 1888 and moved to Maisons-Laffitte near Paris (before their eventual divorce in 1903).

Fernando's engagement to Mabel Elizabeth Wright (1869–1926) was announced in what was described as an astonishment to society. At the time, she was living with her father, a designer of carpets for Higgins Mills, in a boarding house and "her face was her fortune." The wedding took place a week later on March 4, 1890, at the boarding house and they set sail for Europe the following day. Upon their return, they lived in New York and at Tuxedo Park. Mabel later went to South Dakota where she divorced Fernando in 1895 and, soon after, married the Hungarian Count Bela Zichy (nephew of Mihály Zichy) and became the mother of Count Theodore Zichy. There were rumors of his engagement to be married a third time, including to Constance Biddle a few weeks before his death, but they were all denied.

Yznaga died of diphtheria at the Minturn Hospital in New York City on March 6, 1901. After a funeral at the Little Church Around The Corner, he was buried at Woodlawn Cemetery, Bronx. Upon his death, his estate worth about $2,000,000, was left primarily to his sister, then the Dowager Duchess of Manchester.
