= Marie Walpurgis, Gräfin von Lerchenfeld =

Marie Walpurgis, Gräfin von Lerchenfeld, also known as Countess of Lerchenfeld or Madame de Lerchenfeld, (1713–1769) was an Austrian noblewoman and courtier.

She served Empress Maria Theresa in Vienna as the governess of several of her children. Marie Antoinette, future queen of France, was among her charges.

== Life and career ==
Countess Maria Walpurgis Posthuma von Trauttmansdorff-Weinsberg was born on 13 September 1713 as the youngest posthumous daughter of Count Johann Joseph von Trauttmansdorff-Weinsberg (1676-1713) and Countess Maria Theresia Paar zu Hardtberg (1683-1766). She was paternal aunt of Prince Ferdinand von Trauttmansdorff-Weinsberg.

Marie Walpurgis was appointed to succeed countess Judith von Brandeis as the Aya (governess) to the youngest Archduchesses, among them Marie Antoinette, by Empress Maria Theresa in April 1768, because the countess Brandeis was considered to have neglected the education of Marie Antoinette - who was being prepared to become the queen of France - by spoiling her and not putting any demands upon her. In January 1769, Marie Antoinette's French language teacher Abbé de Vermond reported that her actual education had in fact started only nine month's prior, since her former governess the Countess Brandeis had spoiled to the point of allowng her to skip her studying, but that she was now making progress under her new governess, the more strict Countess Lerchenfeld.

== Marriage and issue ==
On 27 July 1735 she was married in Prague to Count Philipp Ernst von und zu Lerchenfeld auf Köfering und Schönberg (1689-1746). They had one son:

- Philipp Nerius Ernst Sigmund Johann Nepomuk, Count von und zu Lerchenfeld auf Köfering und Schönberg (1736-1801) ⚭ Countess Maria Theresia Friederike von Nesselrode zu Ehreshoven (1744-1819); had issue

== In books ==
She appears in the book Marie Antoinette: Princess of Versailles from The Royal Diaries. In the book, she is a wonderful dancer and a kind woman, whom Marie Antoinette affectionately calls "Lulu".
