= William Hall (Tennessee politician) =

American politician

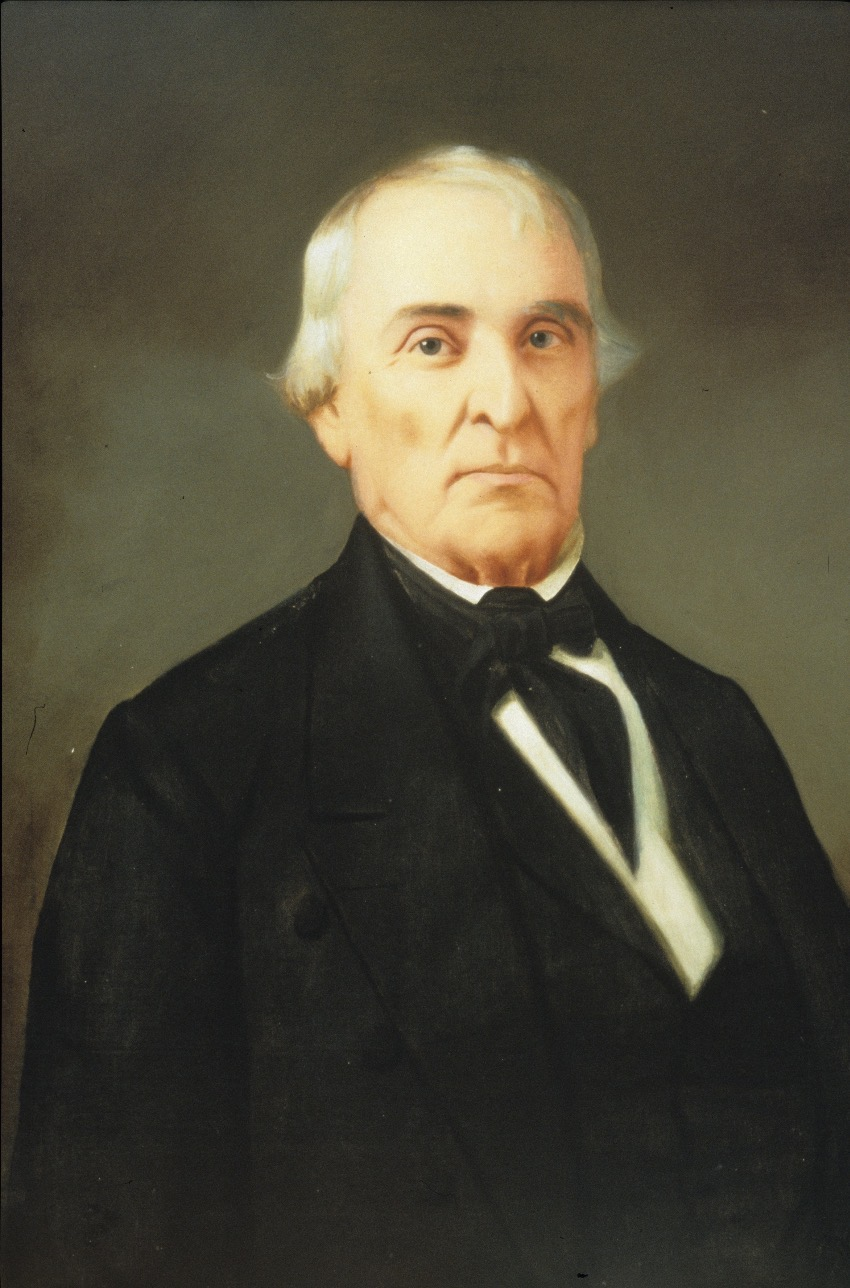
- Portrait by Washington B. Cooper

7th Governor of Tennessee
- In office April 16, 1829 – October 1, 1829
- Preceded by: Sam Houston
- Succeeded by: William Carroll

Member of the U.S. House of Representatives from Tennessee's 5th district
- In office March 4, 1831 – March 3, 1833
- Preceded by: Robert Desha
- Succeeded by: John B. Forester

Speaker of the Tennessee Senate
- In office 1827–1829
- Preceded by: Robert C. Foster
- Succeeded by: Joel Walker

Member of the Tennessee Senate
- In office 1821–1829

Member of the Tennessee House of Representatives
- In office 1797–1805

Personal details
- Born: February 11, 1775 Surry County, Province of North Carolina, British America
- Died: October 7, 1856 (aged 81) Sumner County, Tennessee, U.S.
- Resting place: Hall Cemetery, Sumner County, Tennessee
- Party: Democratic
- Spouse: Mary Alexander
- Profession: Planter

Military service
- Branch/service: Tennessee militia
- Years of service: 1812–1813
- Rank: Brigadier General
- Battles/wars: Creek War

William Hall (February 11, 1775 – October 7, 1856) was an American politician who served as the seventh governor of Tennessee from April to October 1829.

Hall ascended to the office when Governor Sam Houston resigned amidst a scandal, and, as Speaker of the Tennessee Senate, he was the first in the line of succession. After finishing Houston's term, he did not seek reelection. Hall had previously served in the Tennessee state legislature, both in the House and Senate. Following his brief term as governor, he served one term in the United States House of Representatives.

== Early life ==
Hall was born in Surry County in the Province of North Carolina. He was the son of Major William Hall and Elizabeth Thankful Doak. In 1779, the family moved to the New River Valley of Virginia. In 1785, they moved again, this time to a tract of land that would eventually be known as "Locustland," near modern Castalian Springs, Tennessee. Locustland would remain Hall's residence for much of the remainder of his life.

The Cherokee–American wars were raging at this time, and the Sumner County area north of Nashville was particularly vulnerable. On June 3, 1787, William's brother, James, was killed as the two were ambushed as they walked through a field, though William managed to escape. Two months later, as the family was moving its possessions into nearby Bledsoe's Station in anticipation of a Chickamauga Cherokee attack, they were again ambushed. William's brother, Richard, brother-in-law, Charles Morgan, and father were killed. William, along with his mother and two younger siblings, John and Prudence, managed to make it into the fort.

== Career ==
During the early 1790s, Hall served as sheriff of Sumner County. In 1796, he was promoted to the rank of major in the Sumner County militia. He served in the Tennessee House of Representatives from 1797 until 1805.

At the outbreak of the War of 1812, he joined the Tennessee Volunteer Infantry with the rank of colonel, and had achieved the rank of brigadier general by the following year.

In 1821, Hall was elected to the Tennessee Senate. In 1827, he was chosen as speaker of the senate. In April 1829, Sam Houston resigned the governorship following a personal scandal. As Speaker of the Senate, Hall was the first in the line of succession, and thus became governor on April 16. He did not seek reelection, however, and Houston's predecessor, William Carroll, was elected without opposition a few months later. During his brief time in office, Hall continued with the reform plans that Carroll and Houston had started.

An ally of Andrew Jackson, Hall later served in the U.S. House of Representatives for one term (1831–1833) (Twenty-second Congress) and then retired from public life.

== Death ==
Hall died at his farm, Locustland, in Sumner County, a few weeks after giving an account of his frontier experiences for the June 1856 issue of Southwestern Monthly. He is interred at the family cemetery there.

Political offices
Preceded by Sam Houston	Governor of Tennessee; 1829	Succeeded by William Carroll
U.S. House of Representatives
Preceded by Robert Desha	U.S. Representative for Tennessee's 5th congressional district 1831–1833	Succeeded by John B. Forester
