= Phoenix and Eastern Railroad =

Railway line Arizona

Overview
- Locale: Arizona
- Dates of operation: 1901–1910
- Successor: Arizona Eastern Railroad

Technical
- Track gauge: 4 ft 8 1/2 in (1,435 mm)

The Phoenix and Eastern Railroad was a railroad company in the state of Arizona. It was chartered in 1901 to construct a line from Phoenix, Arizona to Benson, Arizona via the Gila River, a distance of 185 miles (298 km). The company would be leased by the Arizona Eastern Railroad, a subsidiary of the Southern Pacific, in 1910. A portion of its original line remains in service and is operated by the Copper Basin Railway.

== History ==
The Phoenix and Eastern was incorporated on August 31, 1901 and among its founders were Baron Gaston de Fontenilliat, William George Tiffany, George S. Pitcairn, M. H. Twomey and J. H. Martin. Its original plan was to construct a line from Phoenix to Benson along the Gila River, for a total length of 185 miles (298 km). At Benson it would interchange with the Southern Pacific and also the El Paso and Southwestern Railroad. The company had the backing of the Atchison, Topeka and Santa Fe Railway, which was seeking to expand its operations in southern Arizona. The Southern Pacific responded by backing a rival company, the Arizona Eastern, which also intended to build along the Gila River. In 1903–1904 a minor railroad war broke out as the two companies struggled over control of the route. The ATSF and the SP eventually reached a compromise: in exchange for the SP taking control of the Phoenix and Eastern, SP made concessions to the ATSF in Northern California.

By 1910 the Phoenix and Eastern had reached Winkelman, a distance of 95 miles (153 km). The Arizona Eastern formally leased the Phoenix and Eastern on March 1, 1910, ending that company's independent existence.

== See also ==
- Southern Pacific Transportation Company
