= Köfering =

- Municipality
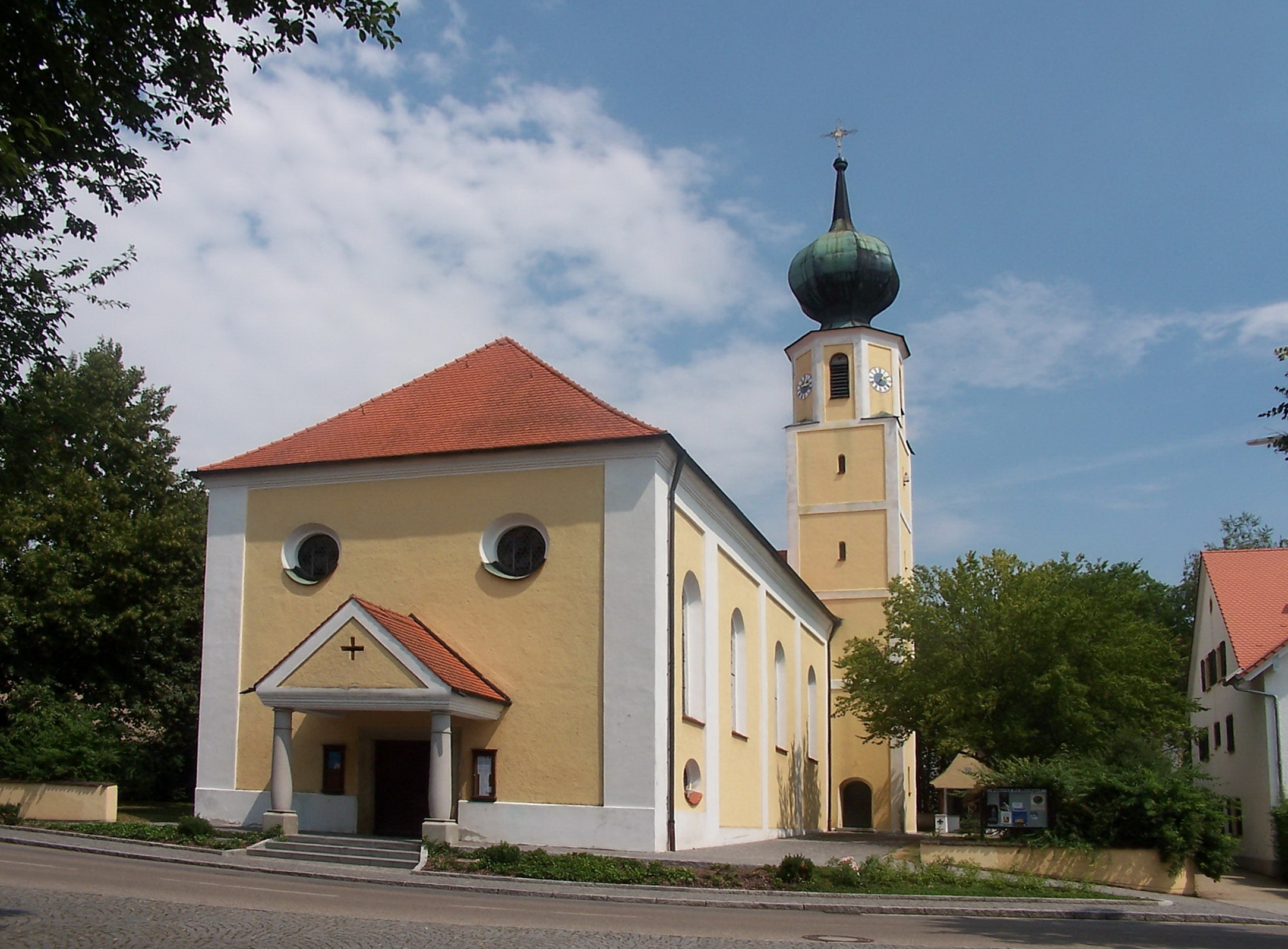
- Church of Saint Michael

- Coat of arms

- Location of Köfering within Regensburg district
- Interactive map of Köfering
- Location within Germany Location within Bavaria
- Coordinates: 48°56′17″N 12°11′42″E
- Country: Germany
- State: Bavaria
- Admin. region: Oberpfalz
- District: Regensburg
- Subdivisions: 2 Ortsteile

Government
  - Mayor (2020–26): Armin Dirschl

Area
  - Total: 5.29 km^{2} (2.04 sq mi)

Population (2025-12-31)
  - Total: 3,106
  - Density: 587/km^{2} (1,520/sq mi)
- Time zone: UTC+01:00 (CET)
  - Summer (DST): UTC+02:00 (CEST)
- Postal codes: 93096
- Dialling codes: 09406
- Vehicle registration: R
- Website: www.koefering.de

Köfering (German pronunciation: [ˈkøːfəʁɪŋ]) is a municipality in the district of Regensburg in Bavaria in Germany.

== Notable people ==
- Philipp Graf Lerchenfeld (1952–2017), politician (CSU)
