= Regensburg University of Applied Sciences =

University in Germany

- Ostbayerische Technische Hochschule Regensburg
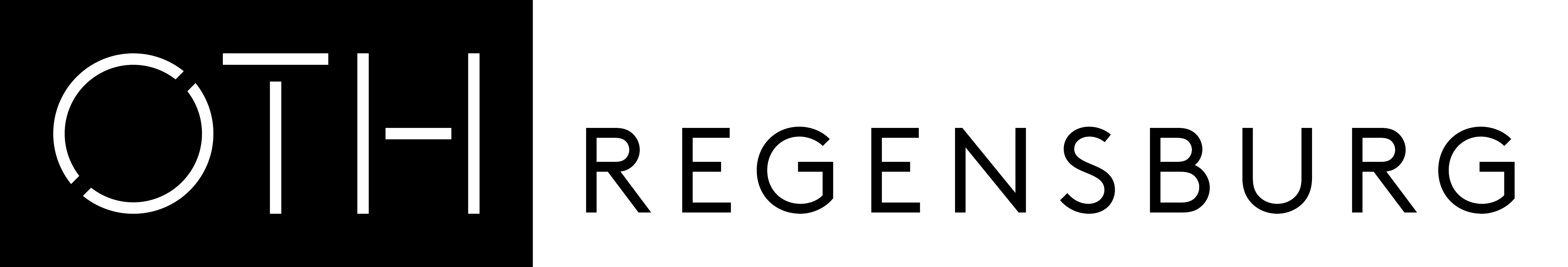
- Type: Public
- Established: 1971; 55 years ago
- President: Ralph Schneider
- Academic staff: 737 (2022)
- Administrative staff: 439 (2022)
- Students: 10,744 (WS 2023–24)
- Location: Regensburg, Bavaria, 93053, Germany; 49°00′13″N 12°05′42″E
- Campus: Urban
- Colors: Black and white
- Website: oth-regensburg.de

The Regensburg University of Applied Sciences (German: Ostbayerische Technische Hochschule Regensburg, literally: East Bavarian Technical University of Regensburg) is a university of applied sciences (UAS) in Regensburg, Germany. It was founded in 1971 as a college for technology, economics and social work, but has roots in the mid-19th century. Today, the university is one of the largest universities of applied sciences in Bavaria. As of the 2025/2026 winter semester, its eight faculties offer 37 Bachelor's degree programs, 23 Master's degree programs, six part-time Bachelor's degree programs, and four continuing education Master's degree programs. The fields of study are Engineering and Business Studies, Computer Science and Mathematics, Social Sciences and Health Care, as well as Architecture and Design. The current number of students in the winter semester 2025/2026 is 11,134.

== History ==
=== Beginnings ===
The history of Regensburg University of Applied Sciences dates back to the mid-19th century, when the private drawing teacher Johann Dörner founded a private school for construction and plan drawing in 1846. In 1868, this school was merged with the "Königlich Bayerische Realschule, Regensburg" (English: Royal Bavarian Vocational School in Regensburg) to offer training in construction trades beyond the regular school curriculum. In 1953 it was transformed and renamed into the so-called Bauschule für Hoch- und Tiefbau (English: School for Construction and Civil Engineering).

=== 1958: Birth of Johannes-Kepler-Polytechnikum ===
Due to the increasing number of students in Regensburg, the government of the Oberpfalz decided in March 1958 to expand the educational offerings of the Bauschule in Regensburg. As a result, the faculties of Mechanical Engineering and Electrical Engineering were founded and named after the famous German mathematician Johannes Kepler, with the institution taking on the name Johannes-Kepler-Polytechnikum. It was intended to enable young people in the region to train as engineers close to home and thus counteract the overall shortage of technical specialists and managers in the East Bavarian region. The aim was to offer an application-oriented education with lecturers from the field.

=== 1964: Foundation of the Fachhochschule Regensburg ===
In 1964, the responsibility for the Johannes-Kepler-Polytechnikum was transferred from the government of Upper Palatinate to the government of Bavaria. The government of Bavaria decided in 1971 to create a new type of university, the model of the Fachhochschule. In this process, the Johannes-Kepler-Polytechnikum was merged with some smaller schools for business and engineering near Regensburg, and the Fachhochschule Regensburg was founded in its modern form. As a result, additional courses of study could be offered and courses in Business Administration, Computer Science, and Social Sciences were added to the catalog.

=== From Fachhochschule Regensburg to OTH Regensburg ===
According to its profile, the university's core task is to provide practice-oriented teaching that is always based on the latest technology and science. This requires research that takes up the results of basic university research and seeks and develops solutions to practical problems. Accordingly, in the new Bavarian Higher Education Act of 2006, the core task of "teaching" for universities of applied sciences was supplemented by the mandatory tasks of "applied research" and academic continuing education. The renaming of the Fachhochschule as a university of applied sciences is to be a consequence of this further scientific profiling.

On 1 October 2013 the university was renamed to Ostbayerische Technische Hochschule Regensburg. The title was the result of the successful participation in the competition for the title Technische Hochschule among the Bavarian Universities of Applied Sciences, organized by the Bavarian State Ministry of Sciences, Research and the Arts. The Regensburg University of Applied Sciences had applied for the title together with the Amberg-Weiden University of Applied Sciences under the umbrella brand Ostbayerische Technische Hochschule. The Ostbayerische Technische Hochschule Regensburg is one of only seven Bavarian universities to bear this title.

With its designation as a technical university, OTH Regensburg has focused its research and teaching on five key topics:

- Energy and mobility
- Information and communication
- Life sciences and ethics
- Production and systems
- Buildings and infrastructure

=== On the way to the campus ===
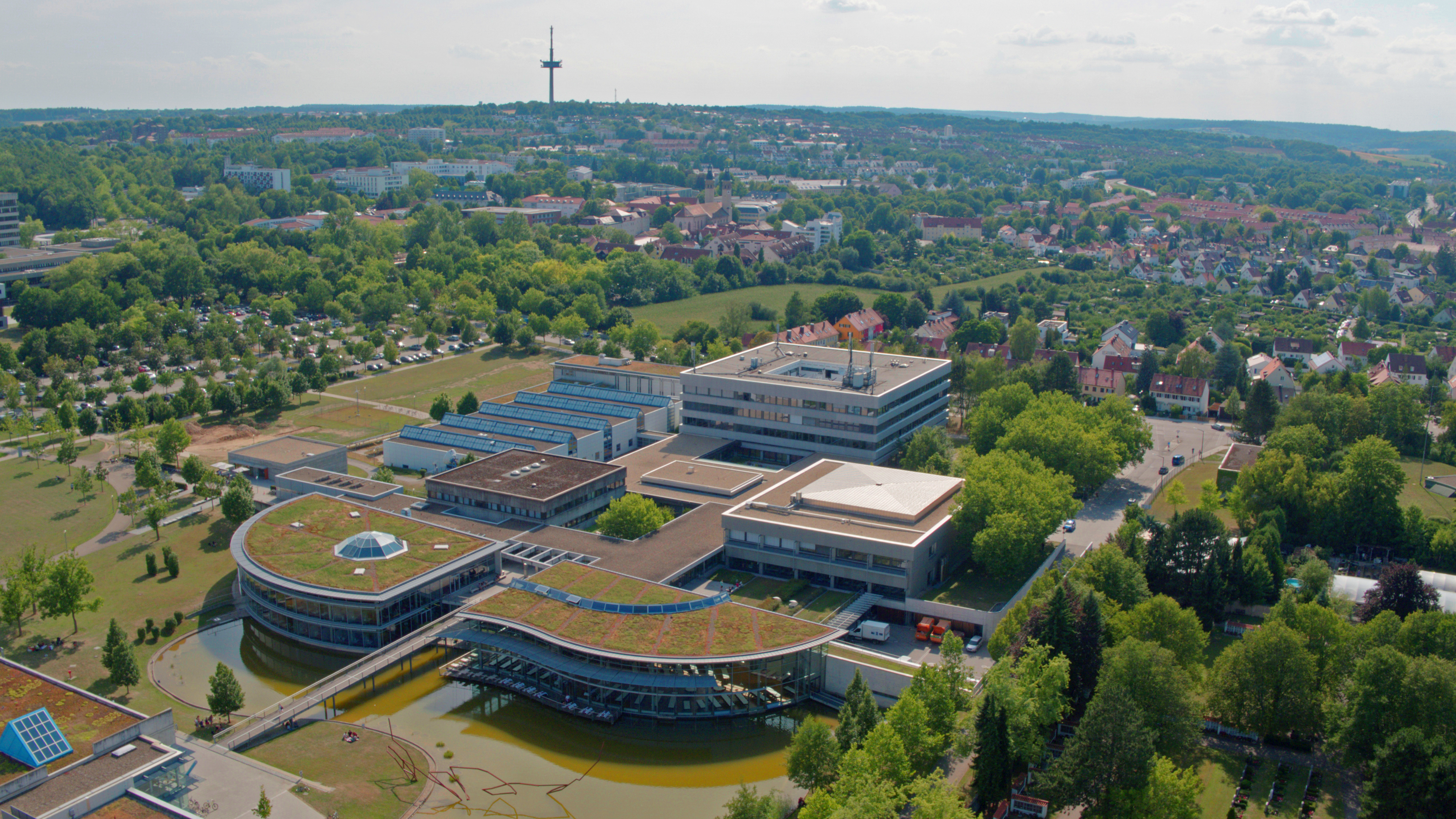
Aerial view of the main campus

The rapid increase in the number of students soon led to an extreme shortage of space at the location in the Westenviertel district of Regensburg. A first solution arose in 1977 from a calculated surplus of space in the buildings already constructed for the University of Regensburg in the Galgenberg district. The University Building Authority was commissioned to permanently integrate the Faculty of Economics and Social Sciences and significant parts of the Faculty of Technology into the buildings of the University of Applied Sciences, which were to be rebuilt accordingly. This laid the foundation for a joint science campus with the University of Regensburg.

Against the backdrop of a further increase in student numbers and overcrowding in the old campus, the decision was finally made in 1995 to gradually relocate the entire university of applied sciences to the new campus, where new faculty buildings were constructed over the years.

Today, the original OTH building on the old campus in the west of the city still house parts of the Faculty of Applied Natural and Cultural Sciences, as well as parts of several other faculties and institutions.

== Faculties ==
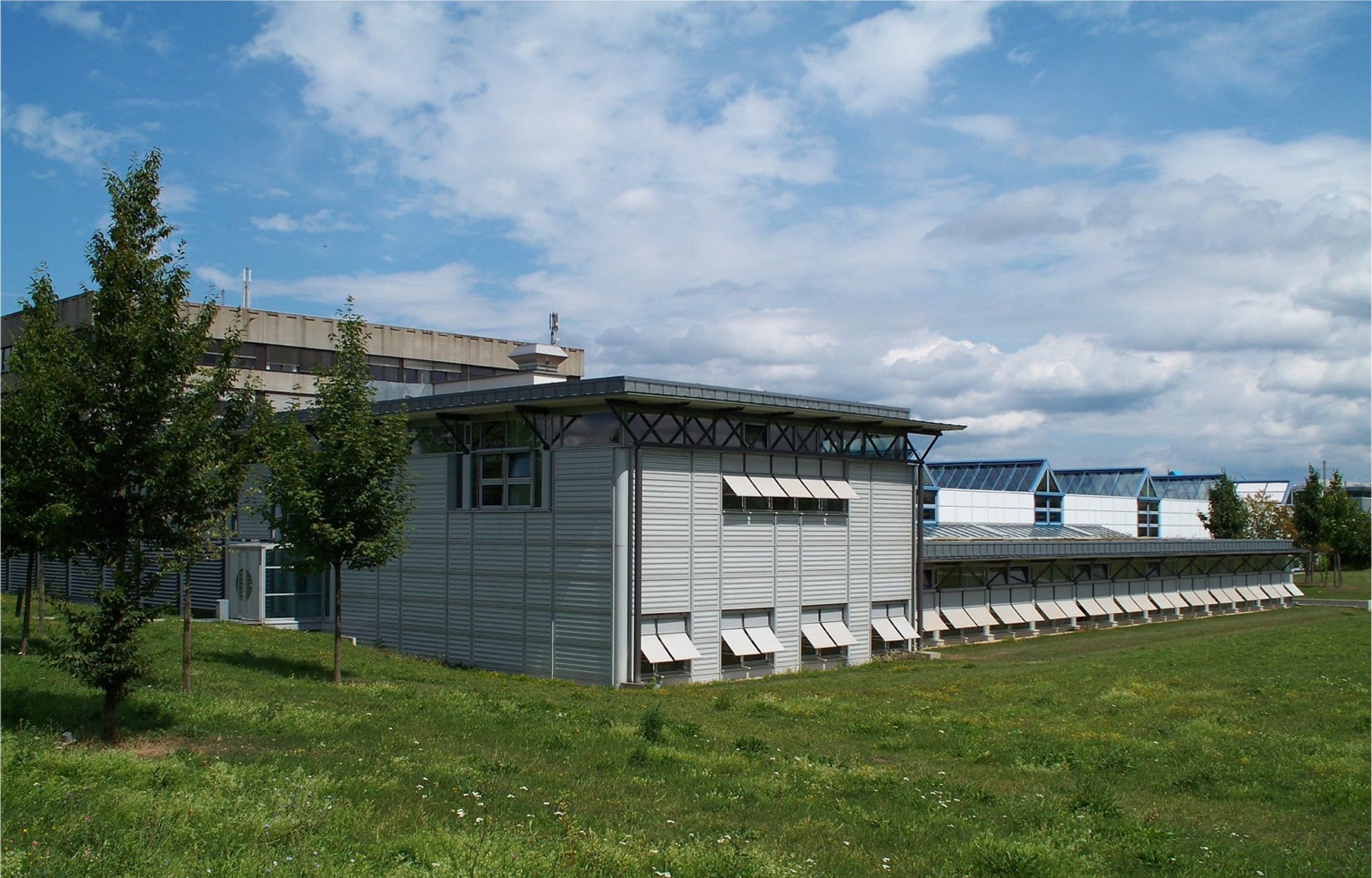
The laboratory building for microsystems technology

The university is structured into eight faculties:

- Faculty of Architecture
- Faculty of Business Studies
- Faculty of Civil Engineering
- Faculty of Computer Science and Mathematics
- Faculty of Electrical Engineering and Information Technology
- Faculty of Applied Natural Sciences and Cultural Studies
- Faculty of Mechanical Engineering
- Faculty of Social and Health Care Sciences

== Rankings ==
In the CHE University Ranking 2023 published by the newspaper Die Zeit, the Faculty of Computer Science and Mathematics achieved second place among all German and Austrian universities of applied sciences. In other CHE rankings, the majority of the faculties were also placed in the top groups, including Faculties of Architecture, Mechanical and Civil Engineering making it into the top 10 in Germany and the Faculty of Business Studies into the top 20.

In the 2026 StudyCheck Award for the most popular higher education institutions, OTH Regensburg leads all German universities and universities of applied sciences in the 5,000 - 15,000 student category.

== Partner universities ==
The Regensburg University of Applied Sciences currently has more than 200 international university contacts with universities and colleges on all continents.

== Notable people ==
- Joe Kaeser (born 1957), former CEO of Siemens AG
- Peter Aumer (born 1976), German politician and deputy

== See also ==
- Fachhochschule
- Hochschule
