= Ostbayerische Technische Hochschule Amberg-Weiden =

State university of applied sciences in Germany

Amberg-Weiden University of Applied Sciences
- Ostbayerische Technische Hochschule (OTH) Amberg-Weiden
- Established: 1994
- President: Prof. Dr. med. Clemens Bulitta
- Academic staff: 95
- Students: 4,100
- Location: Amberg, Weiden in der Oberpfalz, Bavaria, Germany; 49°26′39″N 11°50′53″E
- Website: www.oth-aw.de/en/

The Ostbayerische Technische Hochschule Amberg-Weiden (OTH-AW) is a state university of applied sciences (UAS), which was founded in 1994 under the name Fachhochschule Amberg-Weiden. At the two locations Amberg and Weiden, over 40 bachelor's and master's degree programs as well as part-time degree programs are offered in four faculties. The name "Ostbayerische Technische Hochschule" is based on an existing cooperation agreement in association with the Ostbayerische Technische Hochschule Regensburg.

== Faculties ==
The Ostbayerische Technische Hochschule Amberg-Weiden has the following faculties:

- campus Amberg
  - mechanical and environmental engineering (Maschinenbau / Umwelttechnik)
  - information and media technology (Elektrotechnik, Medien und Informatik)
- campus Weiden
  - Weiden Business School
  - business, industrial engineering and health (Wirtschaftsingenieurwesen und Gesundheit)

== Campuses ==
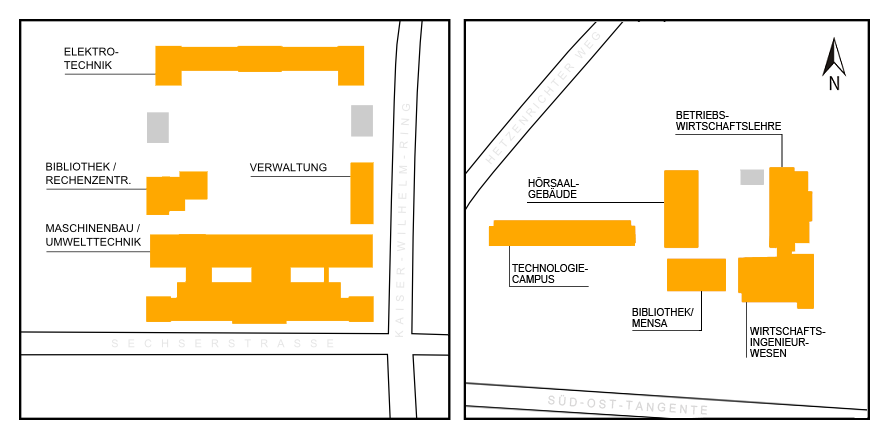
Plans of the two sites: Amberg (left) and Weiden (right)

The university has two main sites located round about 40 kilometers apart from each other.

The campus Amberg is located in the town of Amberg and it is the home of the two faculties mechanical and environmental engineering and information and media technology.

The campus Weiden is located in the town of Weiden in der Oberpfalz. This campus is the home of the faculties Weiden Business School and business, industrial engineering and health.

== See also ==
- Fachhochschule
