= Lerchenfeld family =

Lerchenfeld family coat of arms

The Lerchenfeld family is an ancient German noble family originating from Bavaria, whose members held significant positions within the Holy Roman Empire, Kingdom of Bavaria, Poland and Russia.

== History ==
The first known member was Wernhard (Bernardus) de Lerchinfelt who was mentioned in 1070. The family obtained the title of Baron on 22. February 1653, while the elder branch of the family got elevated to the title of Imperial Count on 20. March 1698 by Leopold I, Holy Roman Emperor with the name Lerchenfeld auf Köfering und Schönberg. Other branch of the family also obtained the title of Imperial Count on 31. March 1770 by Emperor Joseph II and started the line called Lerchenfeld-Prennberg.

== Notable people ==
- Countess Maria Walpurgis von und zu Lerchenfeld auf Köfering und Schönberg (died 1769), governess of Marie Antoinette
- Amalie von Lerchenfeld (1808-1888), socialite and an illegitimate daughter of Duchess Therese of Mecklenburg-Strelitz
- Hugo Graf von und zu Lerchenfeld auf Köfering und Schönberg (1871–1944), German politician and Prime Minister of Bavaria
- Hugo Phillip Graf von Lerchenfeld auf Köfering und Schönberg (1848–1925), Bavarian diplomat
- Magdalena Elisabeth Vera Lydia Herta von Lerchenfeld (1913–2006), wife of Claus von Stauffenberg
- Marie Walpurgis, Gräfin von Lerchenfeld
- Philipp Graf von und zu Lerchenfeld (1952–2017), German politician
