= USS Valiant (SP-535) =

Patrol vessel of the United States Navy

History

United States
- Name: USS Valiant
- Namesake: Previous name retained
- Builder: Charles S. Drowne
- Completed: 1896
- Acquired: 1917
- Commissioned: 29 May 1917
- Decommissioned: 11 January 1919
- Fate: Returned to owner 1919
- Notes: Operated as private sailing cutter Valiant 1896-1917 and from 1919

General characteristics
- Type: Patrol vessel
- Tonnage: 13 or 19 gross register tons
- Length: 60 ft (18 m)
- Beam: 12 ft 6 in (3.81 m)
- Draft: 8 ft (2.4 m)
- Propulsion: Sails plus auxiliary engine
- Speed: 8 knots
- Complement: 9
- Armament: 1 × 1-pounder gun; 1 × .30-caliber (7.62-mm) machine gun

The first USS Valiant (SP-535) was a United States Navy patrol vessel in commission from 1917 to 1919.

Valiant was built in 1896 as a private sailing cutter of the same name by Charles S. Drowne. She was rebuilt in 1907 and was fitted with an auxiliary engine to augment her sails in 1917.

In 1917, the U.S. Navy acquired Valiant under a free lease from her owner, Henry M. Warren, for use as a section patrol vessel during World War I. She was commissioned as USS Valiant (SP-535) on 29 May 1917 at Philadelphia, Pennsylvania.

Assigned to the 4th Naval District, Valiant operated on patrol duties in the Cape May, New Jersey, area for the rest of World War I.

Valiant was decommissioned at the Corinthian Yacht Club near Philadelphia on 11 January 1919 and returned to her owner soon thereafter.
