= Stefan Schmidt (politician) =

German politician (born 1981)

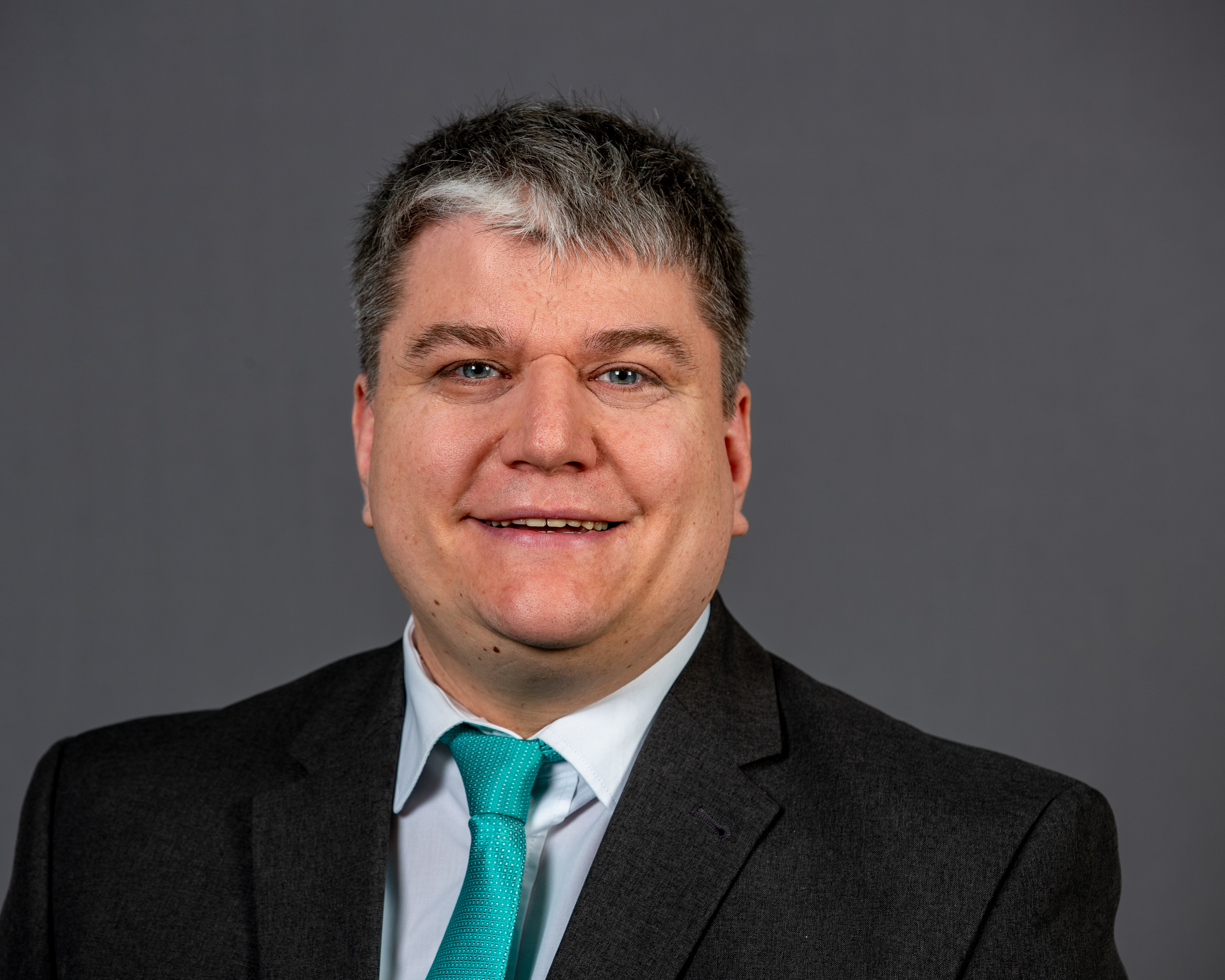
- Schmidt in 2020

Member of the Bundestag
- Incumbent
- Assumed office 2017

Personal details
- Born: 19 May 1981 (age 45) Freystadt, Bavaria, West Germany
- Party: Greens

Stefan Schmidt (born 19 May 1981) is a German politician.

Born in Freystadt, Bavaria, he represents the Alliance 90/The Greens. Stefan Schmidt has served as a member of the Bundestag from the state of Bavaria since 2017.

== Life ==
After graduating from high school, Stefan Schmidt studied teaching at the University of Regensburg. He is a trained secondary school teacher with a focus on political education. From 2007 to 2013 he worked there as a research assistant. From 2009 he was also a research assistant to Thomas Gambke, a member of the Bundestag; from 2013 he was also employed by Doris Wagner, a member of the Bundestag. He became a member of the Bundestag after the 2017 German federal election. He is a member of the Tourism Committee and the Finance Committee. For his parliamentary group he is spokesman for municipal finances.
