= Robert Desha =

American politician (1791–1849)

Member of the U.S. House of Representatives from Tennessee's 5th district
- In office March 4, 1827 – March 3, 1831
- Preceded by: Robert Allen
- Succeeded by: William Hall

Personal details
- Born: January 14, 1791 Gallatin, Southwest Territory
- Died: February 6, 1849 (aged 58) Mobile, Alabama
- Party: Jacksonian
- Spouse: Eleanor Shelby (m. 1820; died 1833)
- Relations: Joseph Desha (brother); Alva Belmont (granddaughter)
- Children: Caroline Desha, Phoebe Ann Desha
- Profession: Merchant, politician

Robert Desha (January 14, 1791 – February 6, 1849) was an American politician who represented Tennessee's 5th Congressional district in the United States House of Representatives.

== Early life ==
Desha was born near Gallatin in the Southwest Territory on January 14, 1791, to Robert Desha and Elinor Wheeler. He was the brother of U.S. Representative and Kentucky governor Joseph Desha.

He attended the public schools and engaged in mercantile business at Gallatin. He owned slaves.

== Career ==
On March 12, 1812, Desha was appointed as a captain in the Twenty-fourth Regiment of the United States Infantry in the War of 1812. He also served as a brevet major before being honorably discharged on June 15, 1815.

Elected as a Jacksonian to the Twentieth and Twenty-first Congresses, Desha served from March 4, 1827, to March 3, 1831. He declined to be a candidate for renomination in 1830 for the Twenty-second Congress, moved to Mobile, Alabama and continued to engage in mercantile pursuits there.

== Personal life ==
In 1820, Desha was married to Eleanor "Nellie" Shelby (1799–1833), a daughter of David Shelby and Sally (née Bledsoe) Shelby. Together, they were the parents of:

- Phoebe Ann Desha (1821–1871), who married Murray Forbes Smith (1814–1875).
- Caroline Lula Desha (1828–1876), who married John Hindman Barney (1811–1853). After his death, she married James Lloyd Abbot (1827–1883) in 1857.

After her death in 1833, Ellen Porter (1815–1889), a daughter of James Porter and Eliza Porter (née French) Farquharson.

Desha died in Mobile on February 6, 1849, aged 58 years old. He was interred in Magnolia Cemetery.

=== Descendants ===
Through his daughter Phoebe, he was a grandfather of Mary Virginia "Jennie" Smith (who married the Cuban American banker Fernando Yznaga) and Alva Erskine Smith, who married William Kissam Vanderbilt in 1875. They divorced in 1895 and she remarried to Oliver Belmont in 1896 and remained married until his death in 1908. She was the mother of three children; Consuelo Vanderbilt (later the Duchess of Marlborough following her marriage to Charles Spencer-Churchill, 9th Duke of Marlborough), William Kissam Vanderbilt II, and Harold Stirling Vanderbilt. Through his granddaughter Alva, he is an ancestor of the 10th, 11th and 12th Dukes of Marlborough.

U.S. House of Representatives
Preceded by Robert Allen	Member of the U.S. House of Representatives from Tennessee's 5th congressional district 1827-1831	Succeeded by William Hall
