= Obertraubling =

- Municipality
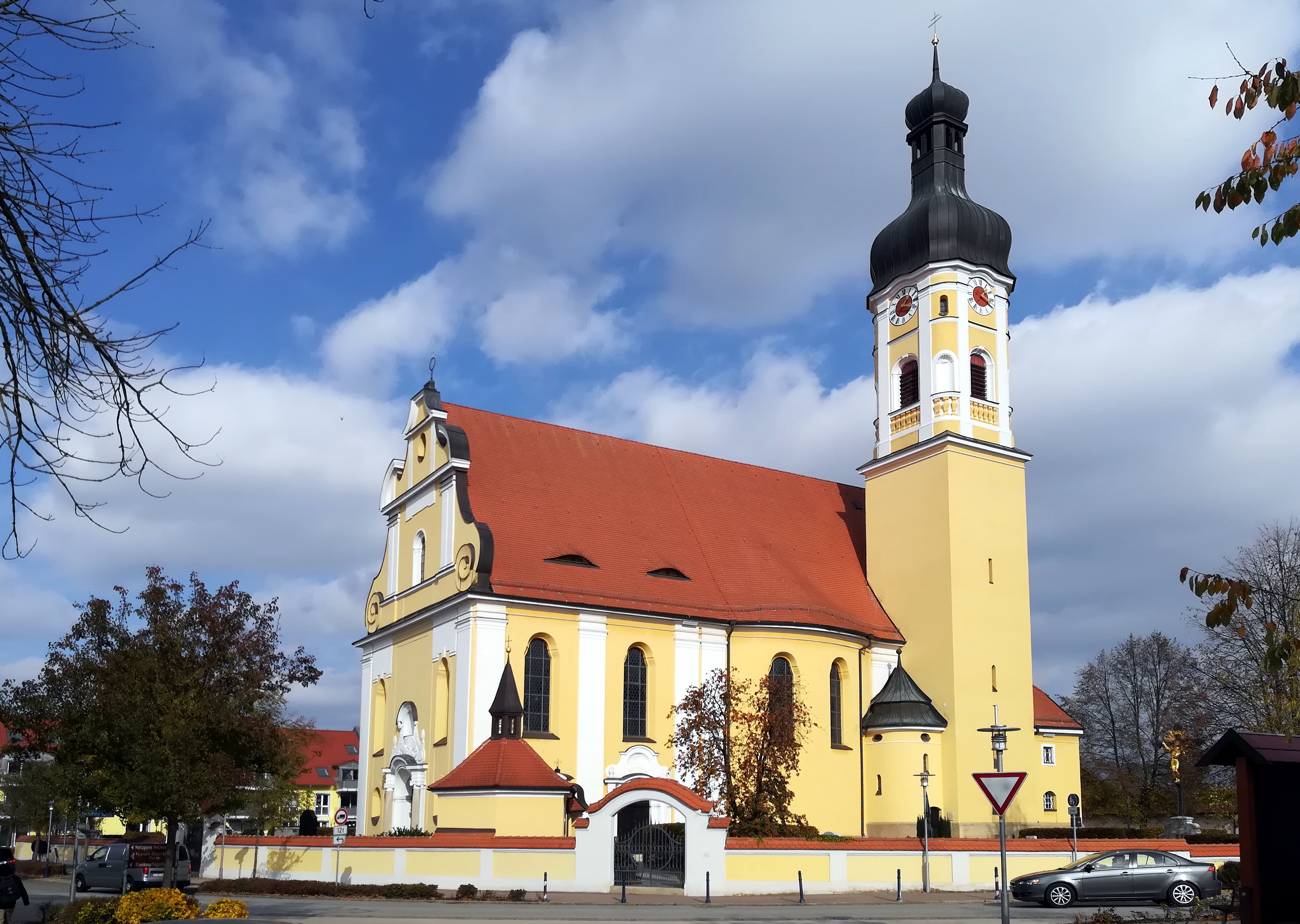
- Church of Saint George

- Coat of arms

- Location of Obertraubling within Regensburg district
- Interactive map of Obertraubling
- Location within Germany Location within Bavaria
- Coordinates: 48°57′57″N 12°10′01″E
- Country: Germany
- State: Bavaria
- Admin. region: Oberpfalz
- District: Regensburg
- Subdivisions: 5 Ortsteile

Government
  - Mayor (2026–32): Simon Wagner (CSU)

Area
  - Total: 24.82 km^{2} (9.58 sq mi)
- Elevation: 344 m (1,129 ft)

Population (2025-12-31)
  - Total: 8,688
  - Density: 350.0/km^{2} (906.6/sq mi)
- Time zone: UTC+01:00 (CET)
  - Summer (DST): UTC+02:00 (CEST)
- Postal codes: 93083
- Dialling codes: 09401
- Vehicle registration: R
- Website: www.obertraubling.de

Obertraubling is a municipality in Bavaria, Upper Palatinate (German: Oberpfalz), in the district of Regensburg.

== Geographical Location ==
Obertraubling is located directly on the southend of the City of Regensburg, the capital of Upper Palatinate.

Community Population divided by subdivisions:

- Einthal (28)
- Embach (44)
- Gebelkofen (568)
- Höhenhof (23)
- Niedertraubling (653)
- Oberhinkofen (920)
- Obertraubling (4,121)
- Piesenkofen (686)
- Scharmassing (197)
- Tenacker (11)

In 1972 the previously independent municipalities Niedertraubling, Gebelkofen and Oberhinkofen joined with Obertraubling and became one municipality.

== History ==
Locally excavated stone axes and vessels dating back to 5000 BC suggest that Obertraubling has been inhabited since the Stone Age. Bronze Age burial mounds in the Neutraubling section dating back to 1,800 BC also indicate human habitation in this part of the Danube flood plain. A Roman farm was established here in the third century AD.

Obertraubling is first mentioned in an 817 AD document concerning a land swap. The name originates from the 11th century landowners, the 'Traublinger' noble family.

During the Second World War Obertraubling was used as an airbase and factory for the Messerschmitt aircraft manufacturing company. Between the end of 1940 and April 23, 1945, the factory was able to house up to 2,750 slave laborers at a time.

Between 20 February 1945 and 26 April 1945, inmates of Flossenbürg concentration camp were held there until forced into a 'death march' to Dachau concentration camp.

On 21 April 1945 B-24 Liberator (serial number 42-95592) "Black Cat" became the last heavy bomber to be shot down in the European Theatre of Operations. The aircraft was hit by flak on a mission to Regensburg and the wing broke off. Three men were seen to escape, but the rest perished when the plane crashed near Oberhinkofen (now part of Obertraubling). A memorial near Oberhinkofen now marks the site of the crash. It is cared for a residents of Oberhinkofen, who sometimes place a candle at the site.

== Politics ==
Former and present Mayor:

- Sebastian Pindorfer from 1926 till 1941
- Josef Wieland from 1941 till 1945
- Max Hirtreiter from 1945 bis 1948
- Josef Bäumel (PWG) from 1948 till 1967
- Hermann Zierer (CSU) from 1967 till 1981
- Leo Graß (FW) from 1981 till 1996
- Alfons Lang (CSU) from 1996 till 2014
- Rudolf Graß (FW) since May 2014

Community Council 2014 till 2020:

- Franz Aukofer (CSU), Dominik Bäumel (CSU), Anna-Elise Dechant (FW), Holger Fäustl (UB), Ernst Graß (FW), Gottfried Gruber (CSU), Regina Hammerl (FW), Wolfgang Hankofer (UB), Josef Heigl (CSU), Michael Hitzler (FW), Jürgen Hofer (CSU), Anni Langensteiner (CSU), Franz Rieger (SPD), Petra Rothammer (CSU), Dr. Matthias Ruckdäschel (CSU), Dieter Seiler (FW), Rainer Sinn (SPD), Karl Span (FW), Anton Stadler (UB), Rainer Tetzlaff (CSU).

Terms of election: every six years (May 2020).

== Education ==
- Hermann-Zierer-Schule, Piesenkofener Str. 11, public school (1st through 4th grade)
- Realschule, Walhallastraße 24, secondary school (5th through 10th grade)
- Public library, Brunnweg

== Twin towns ==
- Dobřany, Czech Republic
