= Duke Maximilian of Württemberg =

German prince (1828–1888)

Duke Maximilian
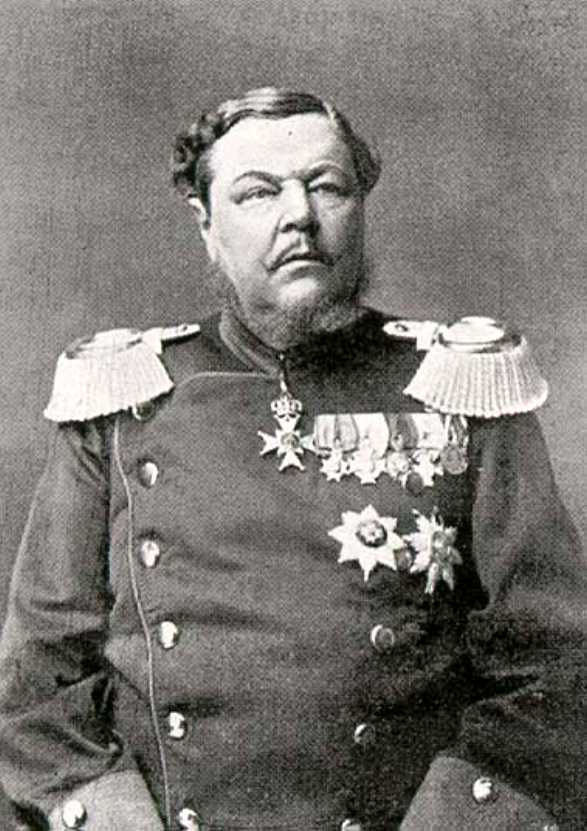
- Born: 3 September 1828; Schloss Taxis, Dischingen
- Died: 29 July 1888 (aged 59); Regensburg
- Spouse: Princess Hermine of Schaumburg-Lippe (m. 1876)
Names
- German: Wilhelm Ferdinand Maximilian Karl Herzog
- House: Württemberg
- Father: Duke Paul Wilhelm of Württemberg
- Mother: Princess Maria Sophia of Thurn and Taxis

Duke Maximilian of Württemberg (German: Wilhelm Ferdinand Maximilian Karl Herzog von Württemberg; 3 September 1828 – 29 July 1888) was a member and Duke of the royal house of Württemberg.

== Biography ==
Duke Maximilian was the only child of Duke Paul Wilhelm of Württemberg and Princess Maria Sophia of Thurn and Taxis, who lived in Württemberg Palace in Regensburg and whose marriage ended in divorce in 1835 after an early separation. Since the beginning of the 1870s he was the owner of the Württemberg Palace in Regensburg and the associated parks in today's Herzogspark.

Maximilian was a great-nephew of the first King of Württemberg, Frederick. On 16 February 1876 he married Princess Hermine of Schaumburg-Lippe (1845–1930), daughter of Adolf I, Prince of Schaumburg-Lippe. The marriage was childless. His wife Hermine called herself Duchess Maximilian of Württemberg in Regensburg, in analogy to her mother-in-law, who called herself Duchess Paul of Württemberg after her husband. Hermine was known in Regensburg as an enthusiastic rider who often appeared around the city on horseback in a black riding dress and was popular as a guest in officer circles.

Like his father and grandfather, he was a Freemason. In 1861 he was accepted into the Masonic lodge "Zu den 3 Cedern" in Stuttgart.

Since 1851, Maximilian, as Prince of the Royal House, had a mandate in the Württemberg Kammer der Standesherren ("Chamber of Eminents"), the upper chamber of the Estates of Württemberg. Between 1851 and 1870 he occasionally attended the meetings in person. After 1870 he was no longer present in person.

== Ancestry ==
Ancestors of Duke Maximilian of Württemberg

8. Frederick II Eugene, Duke of Württemberg
4. Duke Eugen of Württemberg
9. Princess Friederike of Brandenburg-Schwedt
2. Duke Paul Wilhelm of Württemberg
10. Christian Karl, Prince of Gedern-Stolberg
5. Princess Louise of Stolberg-Gedern
11. Countess Eleonore of Reuss-Lobenstein
1. Duke Maximilian of Württemberg
12. Karl Anselm, 4th Prince of Thurn and Taxis
6. Karl Alexander, 5th Prince of Thurn and Taxis
13. Duchess Auguste of Württemberg
3. Princess Maria Sophia of Thurn and Taxis
14. Charles II, Grand Duke of Mecklenburg-Strelitz
7. Duchess Therese of Mecklenburg-Strelitz
15. Princess Friederike of Hesse-Darmstadt

== Literature ==
- Monika Firla: Duke Paul Wilhelm of Württemberg. Naturalist, ethnographer, traveler, collector and museum founder. In: Gerhard Thaddey/Joachim Fischer (eds.): Pictures of life from Baden-Württemberg. Volume 20. Stuttgart 2001. P. 233, p. 238.
