= Adolphus I of Schaumburg-Lippe =

Adolf I
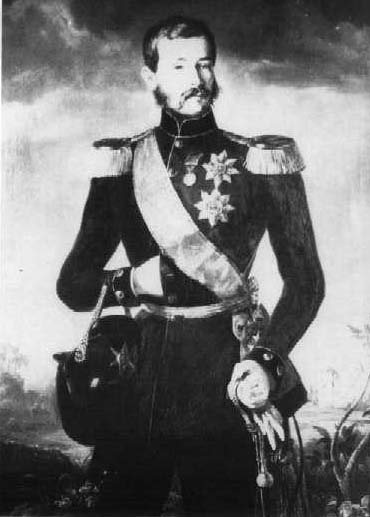

Prince of Schaumburg-Lippe
- Reign: 21 November 1860 – 8 May 1893
- Predecessor: George William
- Successor: George
- Born: 1 August 1817; Bückeburg, Lower Saxony
- Died: 8 May 1893 (aged 75); Bückeburg, Lower Saxony
- Spouse: Princess Hermine of Waldeck and Pyrmont (m. 1844)
- Issue: Hermine, Duchess Maximilian of Württemberg; George, Prince of Schaumburg-Lippe; Ida, Princess Reuss of Greiz; Prince Adolf
- House: Schaumburg-Lippe
- Father: George William, Prince of Schaumburg-Lippe
- Mother: Princess Ida of Waldeck and Pyrmont

Adolphus I, Prince of Schaumburg-Lippe (Adolf Georg; 1 August 1817 – 8 May 1893) was a ruler of the Principality of Schaumburg-Lippe.

== Biography ==
He was born in Bückeburg to Georg Wilhelm, Prince of Schaumburg-Lippe and his wife, Princess Ida of Waldeck and Pyrmont.

He succeeded as Prince of Schaumburg-Lippe following the death of his father, Prince Georg Wilhelm on 21 November 1860. In 1866, Schaumburg-Lippe signed a military treaty with Prussia, and in 1867 entered a military union, where Schaumburgers served in the Prussian military. Also in 1867, Schaumburg-Lippe became a member of the North German Confederation, and later in 1871 became a member state of the German Empire on its founding. He died at Bückeburg and was succeeded by his son Georg.

== Marriage and children ==
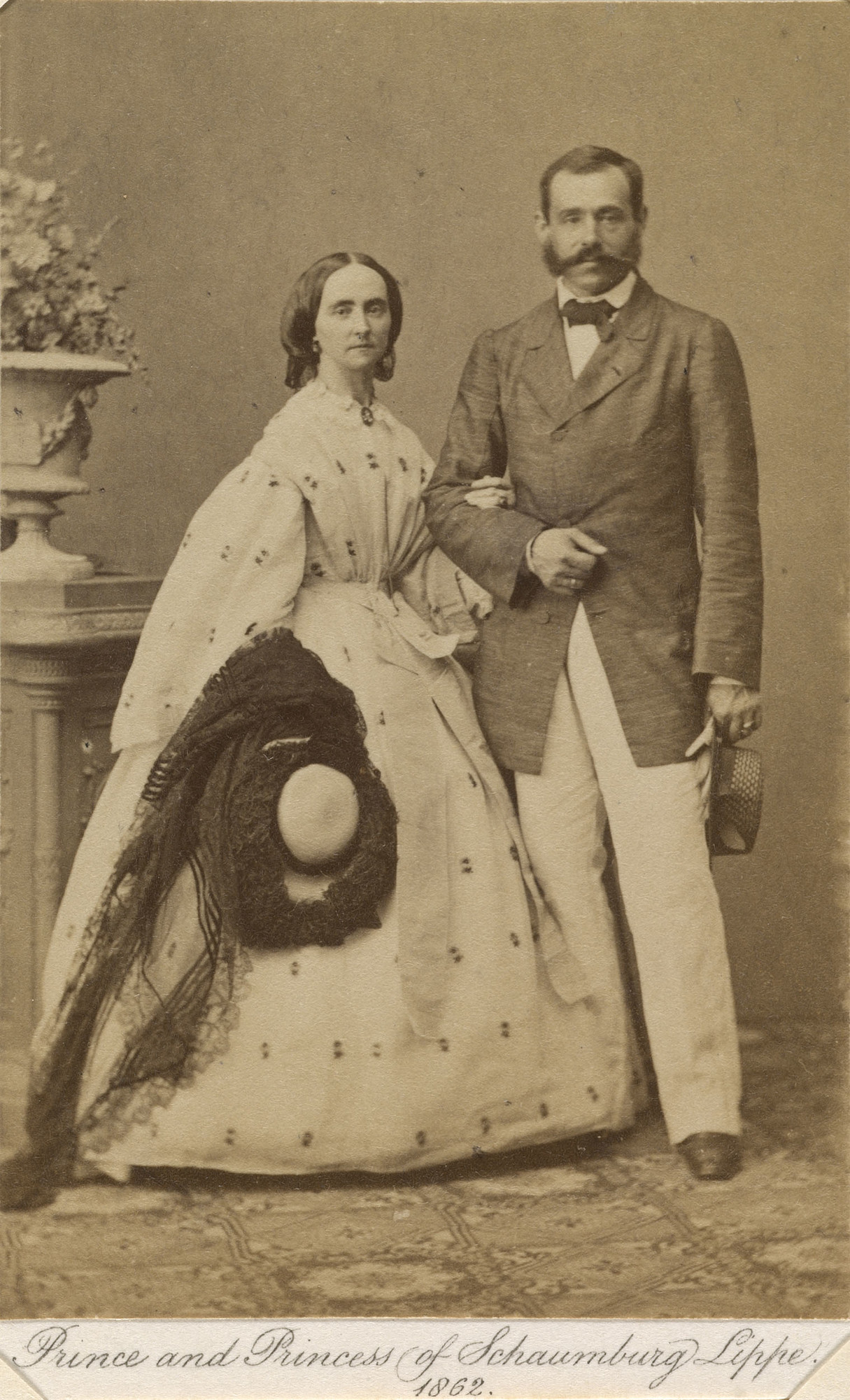
Prince Adolf with his wife Princess Hermine, 1862.

On 25 October 1844 at Arolsen, Adolf was married to his cousin, Princess Hermine of Waldeck and Pyrmont, daughter of George II, Prince of Waldeck and Pyrmont and Princess Emma of Anhalt-Bernburg-Schaumburg-Hoym. His mother was a sister of her father. The couple had eight children:

- Princess Hermine of Schaumburg-Lippe (5 October 1845 – 23 December 1930); married Duke Maximilian of Württemberg, only son of Duke Paul Wilhelm of Württemberg.
- Prince Georg of Schaumburg-Lippe (10 October 1846 – 29 April 1911); succeeded his father as Prince of Schaumburg-Lippe; married Princess Marie Anne of Saxe-Altenburg.
- Prince Hermann of Schaumburg-Lippe (19 May 1848 – 29 December 1928).
- Princess Emma of Schaumburg-Lippe (16 December 1850 – 25 November 1855).
- Princess Ida of Schaumburg-Lippe (28 July 1852 – 28 September 1891); married Heinrich XXII, Prince Reuss of Greiz. They had six children.
- Prince Otto Heinrich of Schaumburg-Lippe (13 September 1854 – 18 August 1935); married morganatically Anna von Köppen (1860–1932), created Countess von Hagenburg, daughter of Heinrich von Köppen and Fanny Rosenkrantz, members of the lesser German nobility. Anna was relative of Carl Köppen. Together, they had three children.
- Prince Adolf of Schaumburg-Lippe (20 July 1859 – 9 July 1916); married Princess Viktoria of Prussia, daughter of Frederick III, German Emperor and Victoria, Princess Royal, eldest daughter of Queen Victoria. No issue.
- Princess Emma of Schaumburg-Lippe (13 July 1865 – 27 December 1868).

== Orders and decorations ==
- Kingdom of Prussia:
  - Knight of the Order of the Red Eagle, 1st Class, 18 January 1850
  - Knight of the Order of the Black Eagle, 18 January 1872
- Baden:
  - Knight of the House Order of Fidelity, 1885
  - Knight of the Order of Berthold the First, 1885
- (Austrian Empire) (Kingdom of Hungary) Austria-Hungary: Grand Cross of the Royal Hungarian Order of St. Stephen, 1885
- United Kingdom: Honorary Knight Grand Cross of the Most Honourable Order of the Bath (civil division), 16 May 1892

Adolphus I of Schaumburg-Lippe House of Lippe Born: 1 August 1817 Died: 8 May 1893
German royalty
Preceded by Georg Wilhelm	Prince of Schaumburg-Lippe; 1860–1893	Succeeded by Georg
