= Panti (disambiguation) =

Panti, Rory O'Neill, is an Irish drag queen and gay rights activist

Panti may also refer to:

== Geography ==
- Panti, Allahabad village in Allahabad, Uttar Pradesh, India
- Panti, district of Pasaman Regency, West Sumatra, Indonesia
  - Cabang Panti, gibbon research station in the Gunung Palung National Park, West Sumatra, Indonesia
- Panti Usu a mountain in the Andes of southern Peru
- Panti Rapih Hospital hospital in Yogyakarta, Indonesia
- Mount Panti, List of mountains in Malaysia
  - Panti Bird Sanctuary (formerly known as Panti Forest Reserve) on the Kota Tinggi Bypass at the headwaters of Sungai Johor, Linggiu and Ulu Sedili, Malaysia
- Panti' in Chickasaw mythology, a fabulous beast with exceptionally lovely teeth which it will exchange for lost baby teeth

== People ==
- Elijio Panti (1893-1996), Belizean traditional healer
- Tuvia Panti, titular character of Viktor von Strauß und Torney's tragicomic novella Mitteilungen aus den Akten betreffend den Zigeuner Tuvia Panti aus Ungarn (1871)
