= Pagal =

Pagal may refer to:

- Pagal (film), a 1940 Indian film
- Paagal (2019 film) or Yeh Saali Aashiqui, 2019 Indian romantic-thriller film
- ”Pagal” (poem), written in Nepali in 1939 by Laxmi Prasad Devkota
- Paagal, 2021 Indian film by Naresh Kuppili
- Pagal Adilabadi (1941–c.2007), an Urdu poet from Hyderabad, India
- Pagal Guy, Indian educational services company
- Jean-Claude Pagal (born 1964), Cameroonian footballer

== See also ==
- Pagli (disambiguation)
- Pagalpanti (disambiguation)
- Paagalpan, 2001 Indian film by Joy Augustine
- Pagglait, 2021 Indian comedy-drama film by Umesh Bist
  - Pagglait (soundtrack), soundtrack album of the film by Arijit Singh
