= Princess Maria Sophia of Thurn and Taxis =

German princess

Maria Sophia
- Duchess Paul Wilhelm of Württemberg
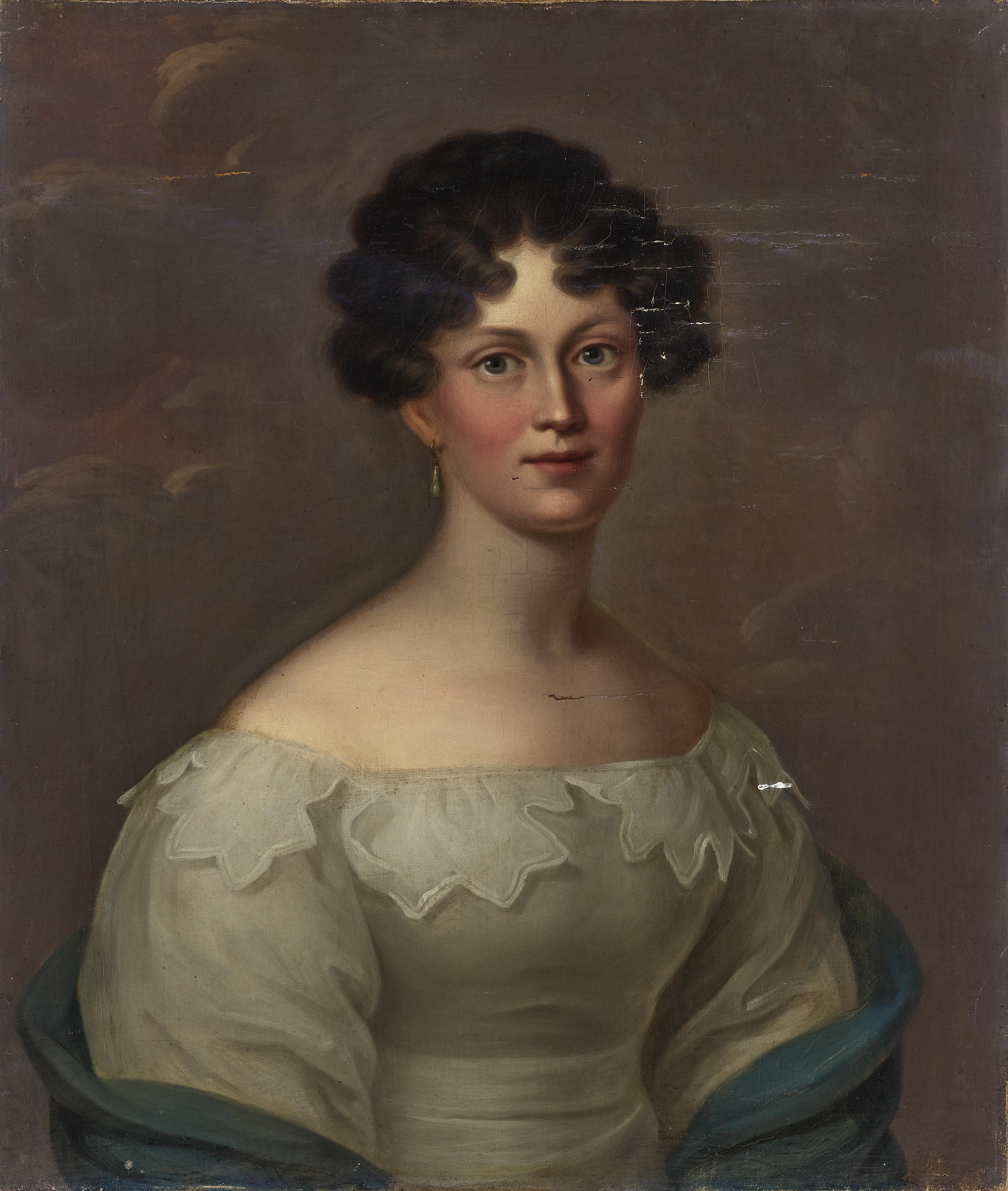
- Portrait by Franz Seraph Stirnbrand, 1820s
- Born: 4 March 1800; Regensburg, Free Imperial City of Regensburg, Holy Roman Empire
- Died: 20 December 1870 (aged 70); Regensburg, Kingdom of Bavaria
- Spouse: Duke Paul Wilhelm of Württemberg (m. 1827; div. 1835)
- Issue: Duke Maximilian
Names
- German: Maria Sophia Dorothea Caroline
- House: Thurn and Taxis
- Father: Karl Alexander, 5th Prince of Thurn and Taxis
- Mother: Duchess Therese of Mecklenburg-Strelitz

Princess Maria Sophia of Thurn and Taxis (German: Maria Sophia Dorothea Caroline, Prinzessin von Thurn und Taxis; 4 March 1800 – 20 December 1870) was a member of the House of Thurn and Taxis, a Princess of Thurn and Taxis by birth, a member of the House of Württemberg, and a Duchess of Württemberg through her marriage to Duke Paul Wilhelm of Württemberg — a German naturalist and explorer.

== Family ==
Maria Sophia was the fifth child and fourth daughter of Karl Alexander, 5th Prince of Thurn and Taxis, and his wife, Duchess Therese of Mecklenburg-Strelitz. She was a younger sister of Maximilian Karl, 6th Prince of Thurn and Taxis and Maria Theresia, Princess Esterházy of Galántha.

== Marriage and issue ==
Maria Sophia married her second cousin Duke Paul Wilhelm of Württemberg, the fifth and youngest child of Duke Eugen of Württemberg and his wife, Princess Luise of Stolberg-Gedern., on 17 April 1827 in Regensburg. Maria Sophia and Paul Wilhelm had one son:

- Duke Wilhelm Ferdinand Maximilian Karl of Württemberg (Schloss Taxis 3 September 1828 – Regensburg 28 July 1888); married Princess Hermine of Schaumburg-Lippe, eldest child of Adolf I, Prince of Schaumburg-Lippe

Maria Sophia and Paul Wilhelm divorced on 2 May 1835. Following her divorce, Maria Sophia acquired Württembergisches Palais and its adjacent Herzogspark in Regensburg. She made her residence at the Württembergisches Palais until her death.

== Ancestry ==
Ancestors of Princess Maria Sophia of Thurn and Taxis

8. Alexander Ferdinand, 3rd Prince of Thurn and Taxis
4. Karl Anselm, 4th Prince of Thurn and Taxis
9. Margravine Sophie Christine of Brandenburg-Bayreuth
2. Karl Alexander, 5th Prince of Thurn and Taxis
10. Karl Alexander, Duke of Württemberg
5. Duchess Auguste of Württemberg
11. Princess Maria Augusta of Thurn and Taxis
1. Princess Maria Sophia of Thurn and Taxis
12. Duke Charles Louis Frederick of Mecklenburg
6. Charles II, Grand Duke of Mecklenburg
13. Princess Elisabeth Albertine of Saxe-Hildburghausen
3. Duchess Therese of Mecklenburg-Strelitz
14. Prince George William of Hesse-Darmstadt
7. Princess Friederike of Hesse-Darmstadt
15. Countess Maria Louise Albertine of Leiningen-Falkenburg-Dagsburg
