= Pagalpanti =

Pagalpanti may refer to:

- Pagalpanti (2018 film), an Indian Gujarati-language comedy film
- Pagalpanti (2019 film), an Indian Hindi-language action comedy film

== See also ==
- Pagal (disambiguation)
- Panti (disambiguation)
- Pagal Panthis, peasant movement in Bengal against the British East India Company
