= Princess Hermine of Schaumburg-Lippe =

German noble

Hermine of Schaumburg-Lippe
- Duchess Maximilian of Württemberg
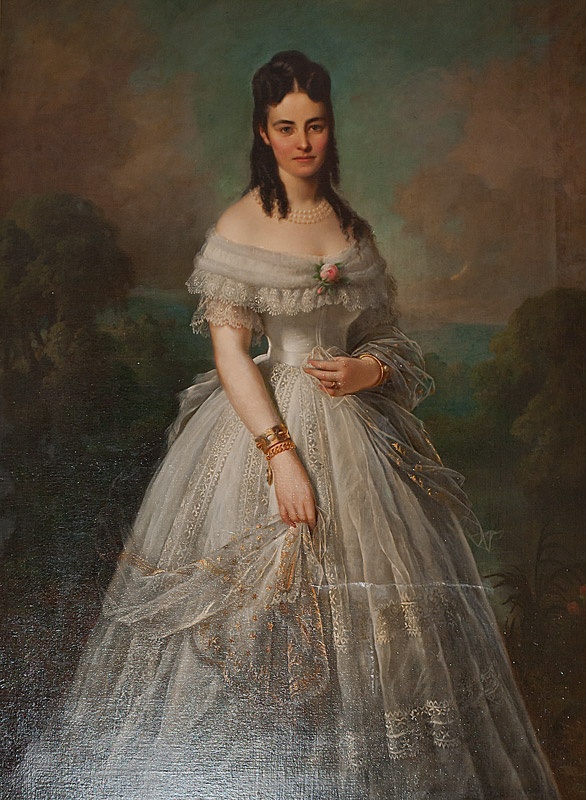
- Born: 5 October 1845; Bückeburg
- Died: 23 December 1930 (aged 85); Regensburg
- Burial: Ludwigsburg Palace, Ludwigsburg
- Spouse: Duke Maximilian of Württemberg (m. 1876; died 1888)
Names
- German: Hermine zu Schaumburg-Lippe
- House: Schaumburg-Lippe
- Father: Adolf I, Prince of Schaumburg-Lippe
- Mother: Princess Hermine of Waldeck and Pyrmont

Princess Hermine of Schaumburg-Lippe (German: Prinzessin Hermine zu Schaumburg-Lippe; 5 October 1845 – 23 December 1930) was a member of the princely family of Schaumburg-Lippe who was the consort of Duke Maximilian of Württemberg from 1876 until his death in 1888.

== Family and early life ==
Princess Hermine was born on 5 October 1845 in Bückeburg, the capital of the Principality of Schaumburg-Lippe, during the reign of her paternal grandfather, George William, Prince of Schaumburg-Lippe. She was the eldest daughter of Adolf, Hereditary Prince of Schaumburg-Lippe and his wife Princess Hermine of Waldeck and Pyrmont. Her siblings included Prince Georg of Schaumburg-Lippe, who later succeeded as reigning prince of Schaumburg-Lippe and Prince Adolf of Schaumburg-Lippe, husband of Princess Viktoria of Prussia.

Despite their high birth, Princess Hermine and her siblings were brought up very simply; one report said they "knew more about the kitchen than many women of lower degree". They were also well educated, and were able to hold their own in discussions about philosophy and science with the learned men in the principality.

== Marriage ==
On 16 February 1876, Hermine married Duke Maximilian of Württemberg, a son of the German naturalist and explorer Duke Paul Wilhelm of Württemberg and Princess Maria Sophia of Thurn and Taxis. Duke Paul Wilhelm was a member of the ducal and Silesian branch of the House of Württemberg. The marriage was childless.

== Death ==
Hermine died on 23 December 1930, at the age of 85 at Regensburg.

== Ancestry ==
Ancestors of Princess Hermine of Schaumburg-Lippe

8. Philip II, Count of Schaumburg-Lippe
4. George William, Prince of Schaumburg-Lippe
9. Landgravine Juliane of Hesse-Philippsthal
2. Adolf I, Prince of Schaumburg-Lippe
10. George I, Prince of Waldeck and Pyrmont
5. Princess Ida of Waldeck and Pyrmont
11. Princess Augusta of Schwarzburg-Sondershausen
1. Princess Hermine of Schaumburg-Lippe
12. George I, Prince of Waldeck and Pyrmont ( = 10)
6. George II, Prince of Waldeck and Pyrmont
13. Princess Augusta of Schwarzburg-Sondershausen (= 11)
3. Princess Hermine of Waldeck and Pyrmont
14. Victor II, Prince of Anhalt-Bernburg-Schaumburg-Hoym
7. Princess Emma of Anhalt-Bernburg-Schaumburg-Hoym
15. Princess Amelie of Nassau-Weilburg
