= Pagli =

Pagli may refer to:

- Linda Pagli, Italian computer scientist
- Pagli (film), a 1943 Bollywood film
- Pagli (TV series), Pakistan

== See also ==
- Pagal (disambiguation)
