= Carlo Restallino =

Italian painter (1776–1864)

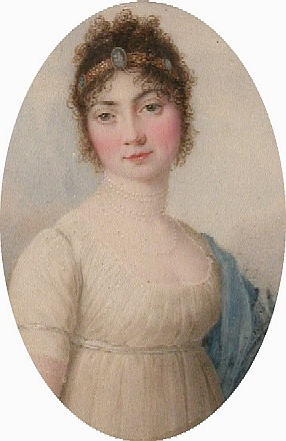
Hereditary Princess Therese von Thurn und Taxis (1773-1839) by Carlo Restallino, 1800

Carlo Restallino (1776–1864) was an Italian painter and engraver.

He was born at Zornasco (Malesco, formerly Domodossola). Early in life, he moved to Munich, and there studied engraving under J. Dorner and M. Klotz. After that he visited Dresden, Berlin, and Italy. In 1808 he was appointed court painter at Munich, and in 1820 teacher to the household of King Maximilian Joseph. There are portraits by him of King Maximilian and Queen Caroline. He died at Munich. He was known as a portrait miniature painter.
