= Duke Paul Wilhelm of Württemberg =

German duke and naturalist (1797–1860)

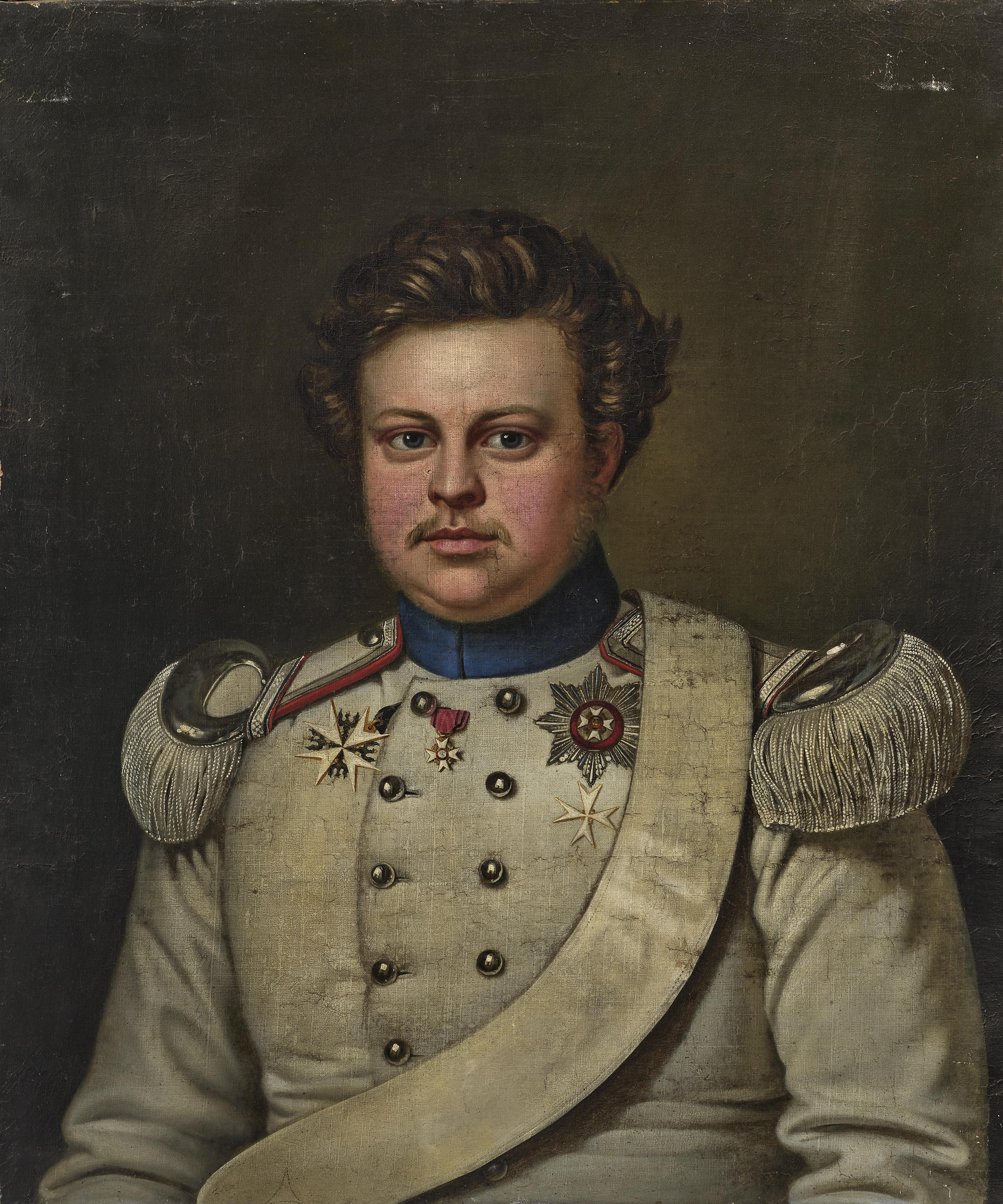
- Born: 25 June 1797; Bad Carlsruhe, Silesia, Kingdom of Prussia
- Died: 25 November 1860 (aged 63); Mergentheim, Kingdom of Württemberg
- Spouse: Princess Maria Sophia of Thurn and Taxis (m. 1827; div. 1835)
- Issue: Duke Maximilian
Names
- German: Friedrich Paul Wilhelm
- House: House of Württemberg
- Father: Duke Eugen of Württemberg
- Mother: Princess Luise of Stolberg-Gedern

Duke Friedrich Paul Wilhelm of Württemberg (German: Friedrich Paul Wilhelm, Herzog von Württemberg; 25 June 1797 – 25 November 1860) was a member of the House of Württemberg and a Duke of Württemberg. Paul Wilhelm was a German naturalist and explorer, who in the early 19th century, undertook several expeditions in North America, North Africa, and Australia. In 1829, he discovered the sources of the Missouri River.

== Family ==
Paul Wilhelm was the fifth and youngest child of Duke Eugen of Württemberg and his wife Princess Luise of Stolberg-Gedern. Through his father, Paul Wilhelm was a grandson of Frederick II Eugene, Duke of Württemberg and his wife Friederike Dorothea of Brandenburg-Schwedt. He was a nephew of Frederick of Württemberg, the first King of Württemberg.

== Expeditions ==
Between the years 1822 to 1824, Paul Wilhelm undertook his first major research trip to Cuba and North America. He kept a diary in which he described the places he visited in great scientific and ethnological detail. An artist produced numerous images of the landscapes, plants, and animals.

Paul Wilhelm devoted himself particularly to the study of North and South America. He spent time exploring the western United States and met the son of Sacagawea, Jean Baptiste Charbonneau. After his initial meeting with Jean Baptiste Charbonneau in 1823 at the Kansas River, likely arranged by William Clark, Paul Wilhelm left camp and headed north with Great Plains veteran Toussaint Charbonneau, Jean Baptiste's father and Sacagawea's husband, hired as an interpreter. The Duke’s party spent five months in the upper Missouri country visiting trading forts, Indian tribes, and collecting scientific data. Paul Wilhelm is traditionally included as one of the first explorers of the headwaters of the Mississippi and Missouri rivers.

As late as the 1850s, he visited Baron Ottomar von Behr, a German farmer and sheep breeder, meteorologist, and scientist living in Sisterdale, Texas. When he visited New Braunfels on an 1855 visit, artist Carl G. von Iwonski made him a gift of six pencil sketches of the artist's Texas work.

== Marriage and later life ==
Paul Wilhelm married his second cousin Princess Maria Sophia of Thurn and Taxis, fifth child and fourth daughter of Karl Alexander, 5th Prince of Thurn and Taxis and his wife Duchess Therese of Mecklenburg-Strelitz, on 17 April 1827 in Regensburg. Paul Wilhelm and Maria Sophia Dorothea had one son:

- Duke Wilhelm Ferdinand Maximilian Karl of Württemberg (Schloss Taxis 3 September 1828 – Regensburg 28 July 1888), married Princess Hermine of Schaumburg-Lippe, eldest child of Adolf I, Prince of Schaumburg-Lippe

He and Maria Sophia Dorothea divorced as early as 2 May 1835. After his marriage ended, Paul Wilhelm resided at Mergentheim Palace in Mergentheim, where he kept his extensive ethnological collection acquired during his travels. In Bad Carlsruhe, Silesia, he built the palace, Palais "Paulusburg," but it was not completed until the year of his death.

== Literary works ==
- Paul von Württemberg: Early Sacramento: glimpses of John Augustus Sutter, the Hok farm, and neighboring Indian tribes, Sacramento: Sacramento Book Collectors Club, 1973 OCLC 3187671 ASIN B000GR0CVO
- Paul von Württemberg: Paul Wilhelm, Duke of Württemberg Travels in North America 1822–1824, Transl. by W. Robert Nitzke. Ed. by Savoie Lottinville Norman. University of Oklahoma Press, 1973 (reprint). The American Exploration and Travel Ser. Vol. 63. ASIN B0006C3UE0

== Honours ==
- 1831: Honorary citizenship in Bad Mergentheim
- 1845: Honorary membership of the Vereins für vaterländische Naturkunde in Württemberg

The genus Hohenbergia of the family Bromeliaceae has been named after Friedrich Paul Wilhelm Duke of Württemberg - who travelled the Americas under the alias of Baron von Hohenberg by Julius Hermann Schultes. The genus Hohenbergiopsis from the same family and Paulo-wilhelmia from the Acanthaceae are also named for him.

== Ancestry ==
Ancestors of Duke Paul Wilhelm of Württemberg

8. Karl Alexander, Duke of Württemberg
4. Frederick II Eugene, Duke of Württemberg
9. Princess Maria Augusta of Thurn and Taxis
2. Duke Eugen of Württemberg
10. Margrave Frederick William of Brandenburg-Schwedt
5. Friederike Dorothea of Brandenburg-Schwedt
11. Princess Sophia Dorothea of Prussia
1. Duke Paul Wilhelm of Württemberg
12. Prince Friedrich Karl of Stolberg-Gedern
6. Prince Christian Karl of Stolberg-Gedern
13. Princess Luise of Nassau-Saarbrücken
3. Princess Luise of Stolberg-Gedern
14. Count Heinrich II Reuss of Lobenstein
7. Countess Eleanore Reuss of Lobenstein
15. Countess Juliana Dorothea Charlotte of Hochberg, Baroness of Fürstenstein
