= Gernot Döllner =

German business executive (born 1969)

- Döllner in 2025
- Education: Technical University of Braunschweig
- Occupations: Chairman of the Board of Management, Audi; Member of the Board of Management, Volkswagen Group
- Years active: 1993–present
- Board member of: FC Bayern Munich

Gernot Döllner (born in 6 January 1969) is a German engineer, business executive, and CEO of Audi AG. Additionally, he is a member of the Board of Management of the Volkswagen Group. He heads the Progressive Brand Group, which includes Audi, Bentley, Lamborghini, and Ducati. Previously, Döllner served as Chief Strategist and Secretary-General of the Volkswagen Group. He is also the Chairman of the Board of Audi Motorsport AG.

== Education ==
Döllner hails from Bückeburg in Lower Saxony. He studied mechanical engineering, focusing on construction and vehicle technology, at the Technical University of Braunschweig and the University of Waterloo. In 1996, Döllner earned his Doctorate in Engineering.

== Career ==
Döllner began his career at the Volkswagen Group in Wolfsburg. In 1998, he joined Porsche in Stuttgart. During his time there, he has worked as project manager for the Porsche 918 Spyder and head of the Panamera series from 2011 to 2018. His last role at Porsche was as Head of Product and Concept.

In 2021, Döllner returned to Volkswagen in Wolfsburg, where he took over the management of corporate strategy, product strategy, and the corporate secretariat. He played a crucial role in the company's shift towards electric mobility.

On September 1, 2023, Döllner was appointed as the Chairman of the Audi Board of Management. Additionally, he joined the Board of Management of the Volkswagen Group, where he took charge of the entire Progressive Brand Group, including Audi, Bentley, Lamborghini, and Ducati. He accelerated Audi's electric mobility transition with a significant product initiative. In March 2024, he took over responsibility for the development department of Audi. He also cancelled Audi's all-EV deadline, stating that the brand would remain flexible.

In 2023, Döllner was elected to the Supervisory Board of FC Bayern Munich and became the Deputy Chairman of the committee. Audi is a sponsor and shareholder of the Bundesliga football club.

On 25 October 2026, Döllner appeared on stage with Donald Trump in the pro-Republican US election campaign and announced that Audi will build a new auto factory in the State of Georgia. Aside from the fact that this decision must first be made by the Supervisory Board of VW AG, Döllner's appearance drew fierce criticism in Germany, not least because the Audi CEO violated his own regulations, which stipulate that “no public appearances” with participating parties or politicians may be made “in the three months leading up to elections.”
