= Bückeburg =

- Town
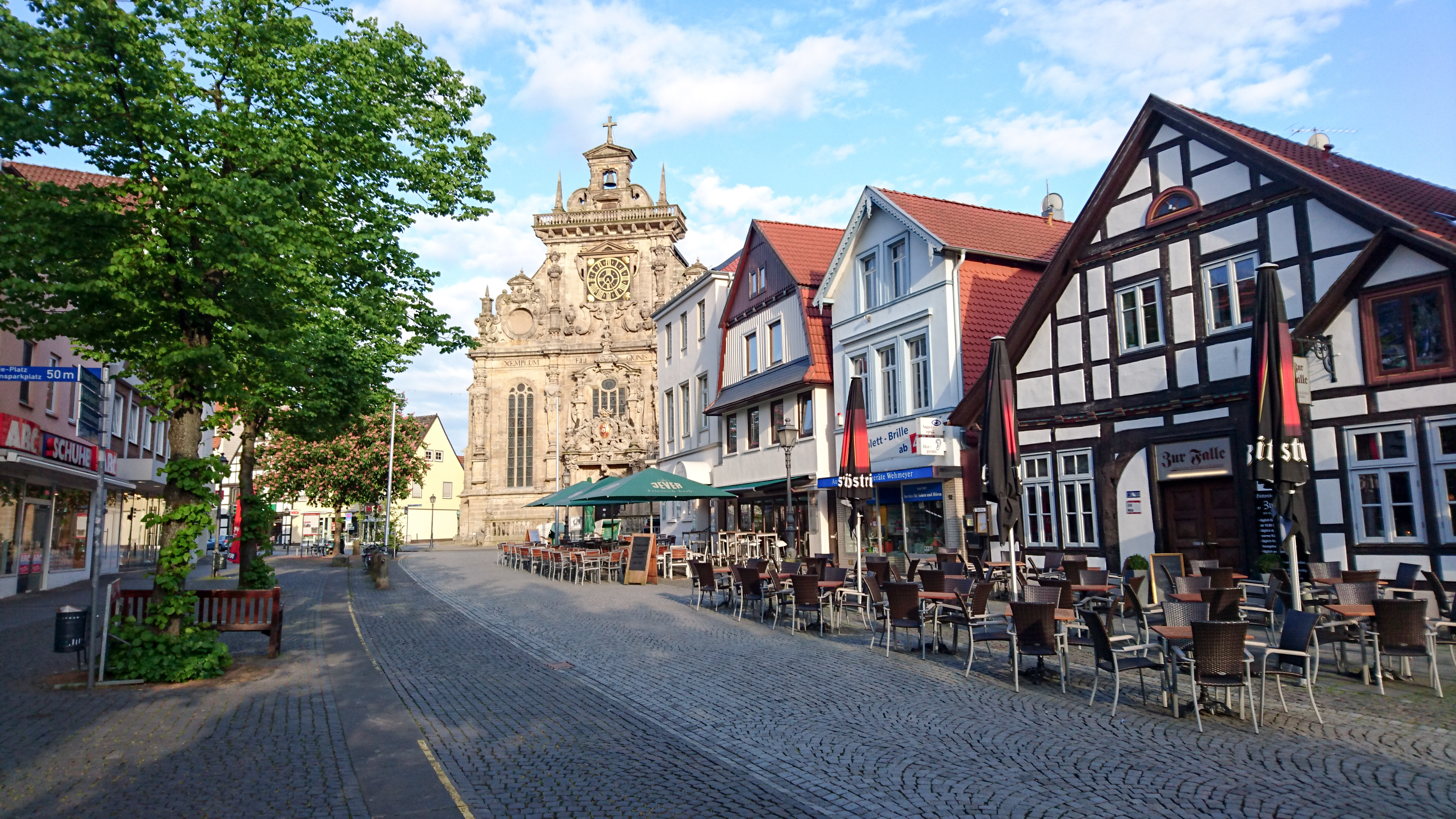
- Long Street with the Lutheran Bückeburg Church

- Flag Coat of arms

- Location of Bückeburg within Schaumburg district
- Interactive map of Bückeburg
- Location within Germany Location within Lower Saxony
- Coordinates: 52°15′39″N 09°02′57″E
- Country: Germany
- State: Lower Saxony
- District: Schaumburg
- Subdivisions: 13

Government
  - Mayor (2021–26): Axel Wohlgemuth (CDU)

Area
  - Total: 68.9 km^{2} (26.6 sq mi)
- Elevation: 63 m (207 ft)

Population (2025-12-31)
  - Total: 19,016
  - Density: 276/km^{2} (715/sq mi)
- Time zone: UTC+01:00 (CET)
  - Summer (DST): UTC+02:00 (CEST)
- Postal codes: 31675
- Dialling codes: 05722
- Vehicle registration: SHG
- Website: www.bueckeburg.de

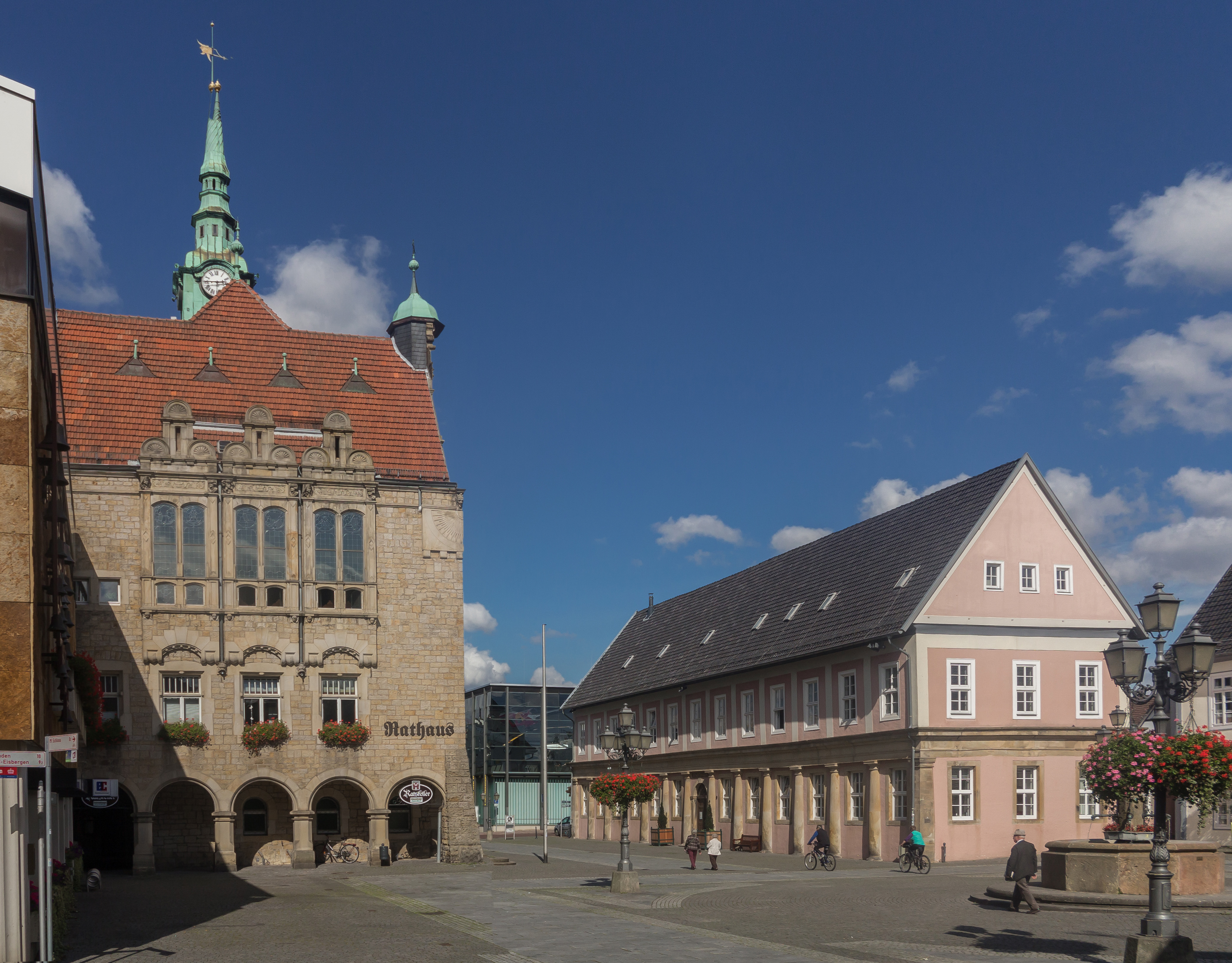
Bückeburg, townhall

Bückeburg (German pronunciation: [ˈbʏkəbʊʁk]; Northern Low Saxon: Bückeborg) is a town in Lower Saxony, Germany, on the border with North Rhine Westphalia. It is located in the district of Schaumburg close to the northern slopes of the Weserbergland ridge. Bückeburg has a population of 21,030.

== History ==
Until the German Revolution of 1918–1919, Bückeburg was the capital of the tiny principality of Schaumburg-Lippe. Schaumburg-Lippe continued to be an independent German state (Free state) until 1946.

Houses began to gather around the castle c. 1365 and were protected by a city wall in the 17th century. In the 19th century, it was connected to the Minden and Hanover Railway and housed a synagogue. The poet J. G. von Herder was court preacher here from 1771 to 1776.

Bückeburg is a former British garrison town and had a number of British residents until recently. Most of the British residents worked at the British Military Hospital (BMH) in Rinteln, or in the local English Prince Rupert School, also in Rinteln. The number of British military residents in Bückeburg decreased significantly in the late 1990s, when BMH Rinteln closed down, however the staff of Prince Rupert School were still based in Bückeburg until the closure of the school in July 2014.

== Buildings ==
=== Bückeburg Palace ===
Bückeburg Palace (Schloss Bückeburg) was the residence of the Princes of Schaumburg-Lippe. Although the Princely family surrendered political power in 1918, they still own it and live there today. The palace, part of which is open to the public, is a major tourist attraction and houses significant works of art, as well as a notable library. The history of the building spans 700 years, with the most important contributions stemming from the 16th, 17th, and 19th centuries.

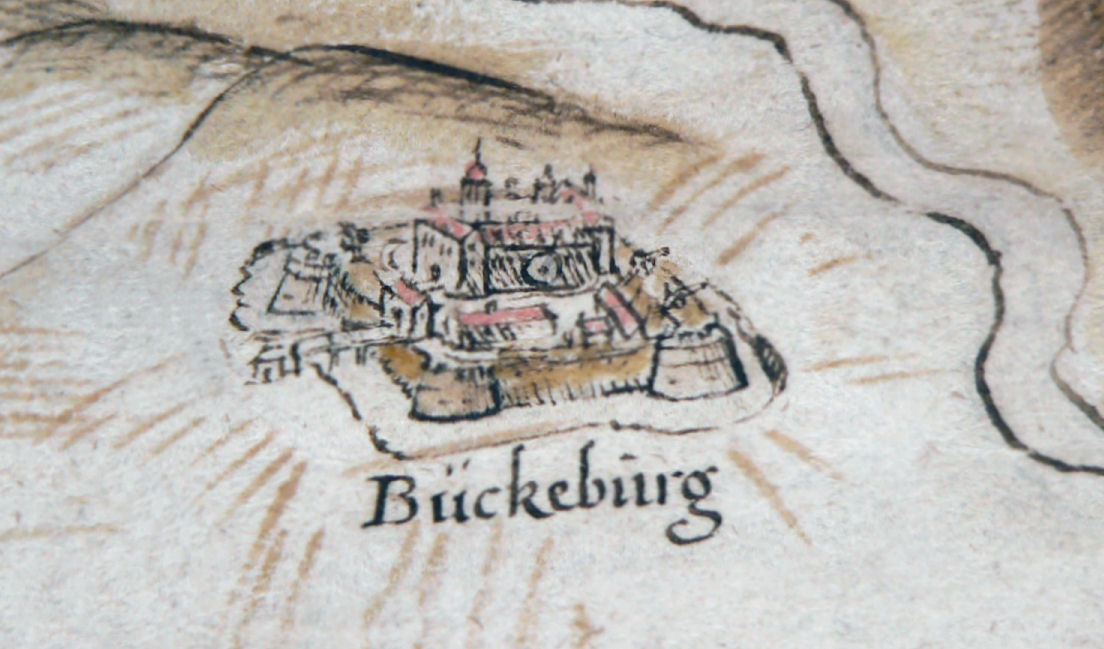
Drawing of Bückeburg along the Weser in 1520, during the Hildesheim Diocesan Feud. Drawing by Johannes Krabbe.

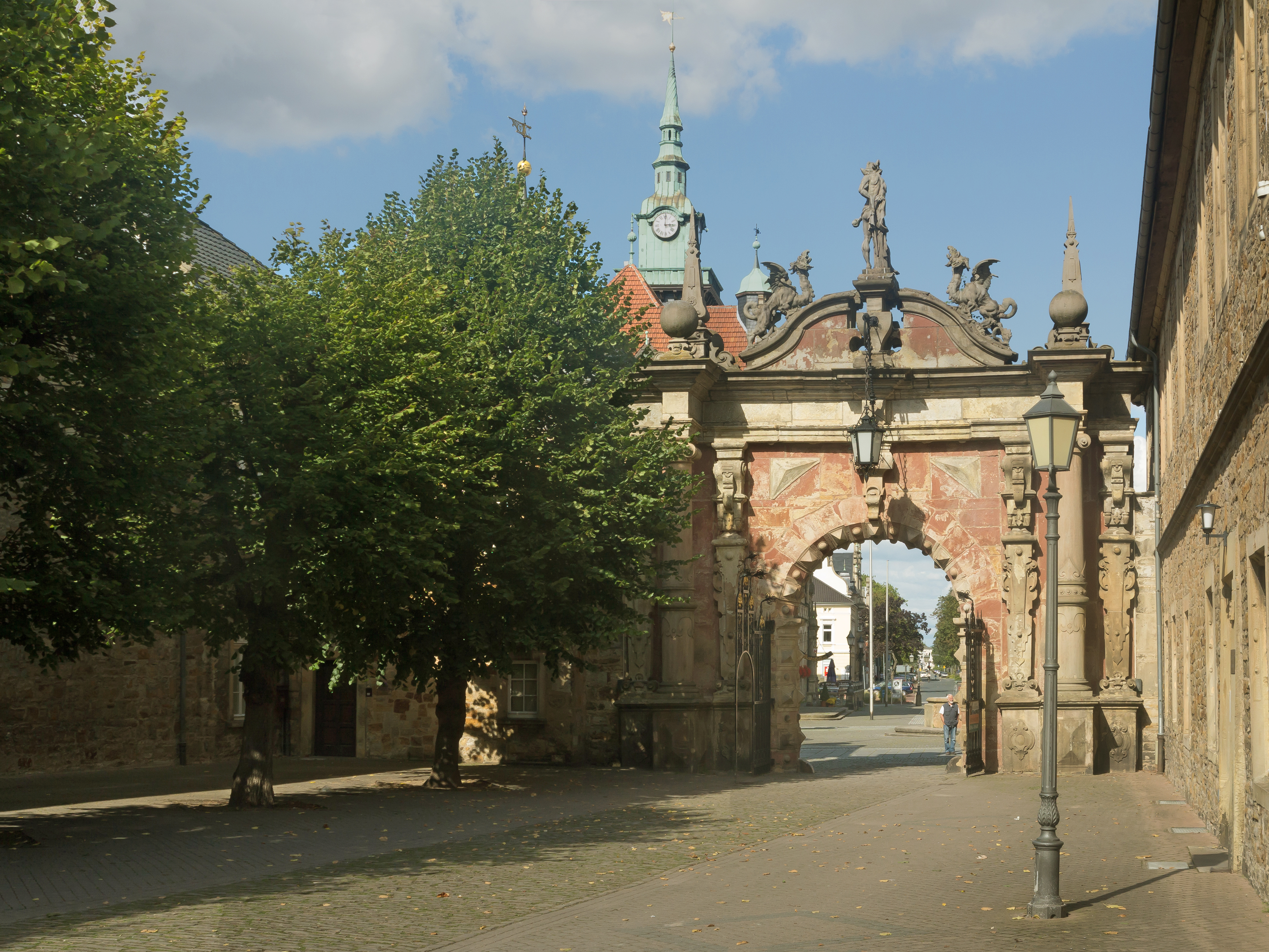
Entrance gate to the palace (16th century).

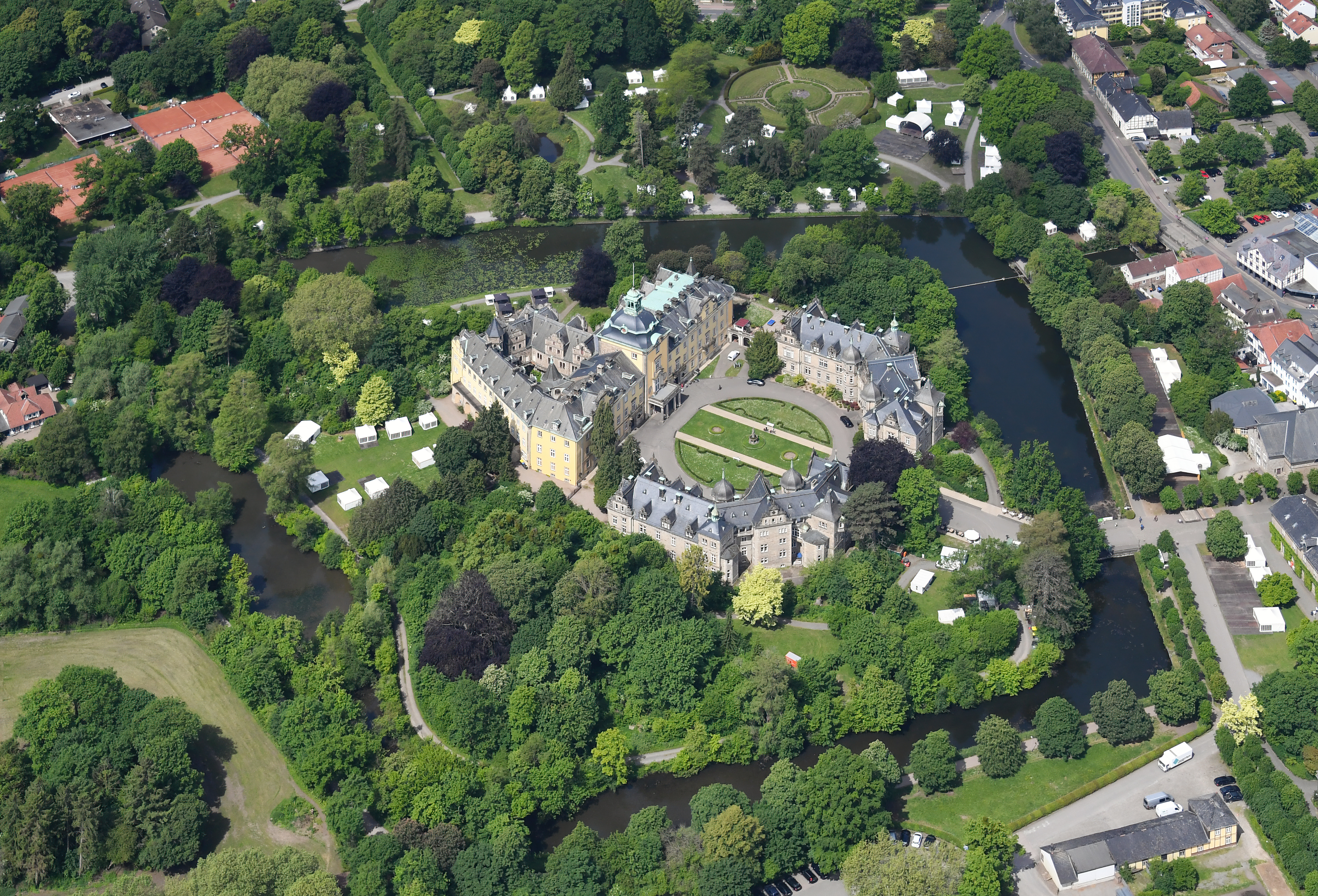
Aerial view of Bückeburg Palace. On the left is the old Renaissance building, with a tower grouped around an inner courtyard. The neo-baroque extension consists of a wing on the right and two separate wing buildings in front. The old moat still runs around the complex, but without the former defensive ramps.

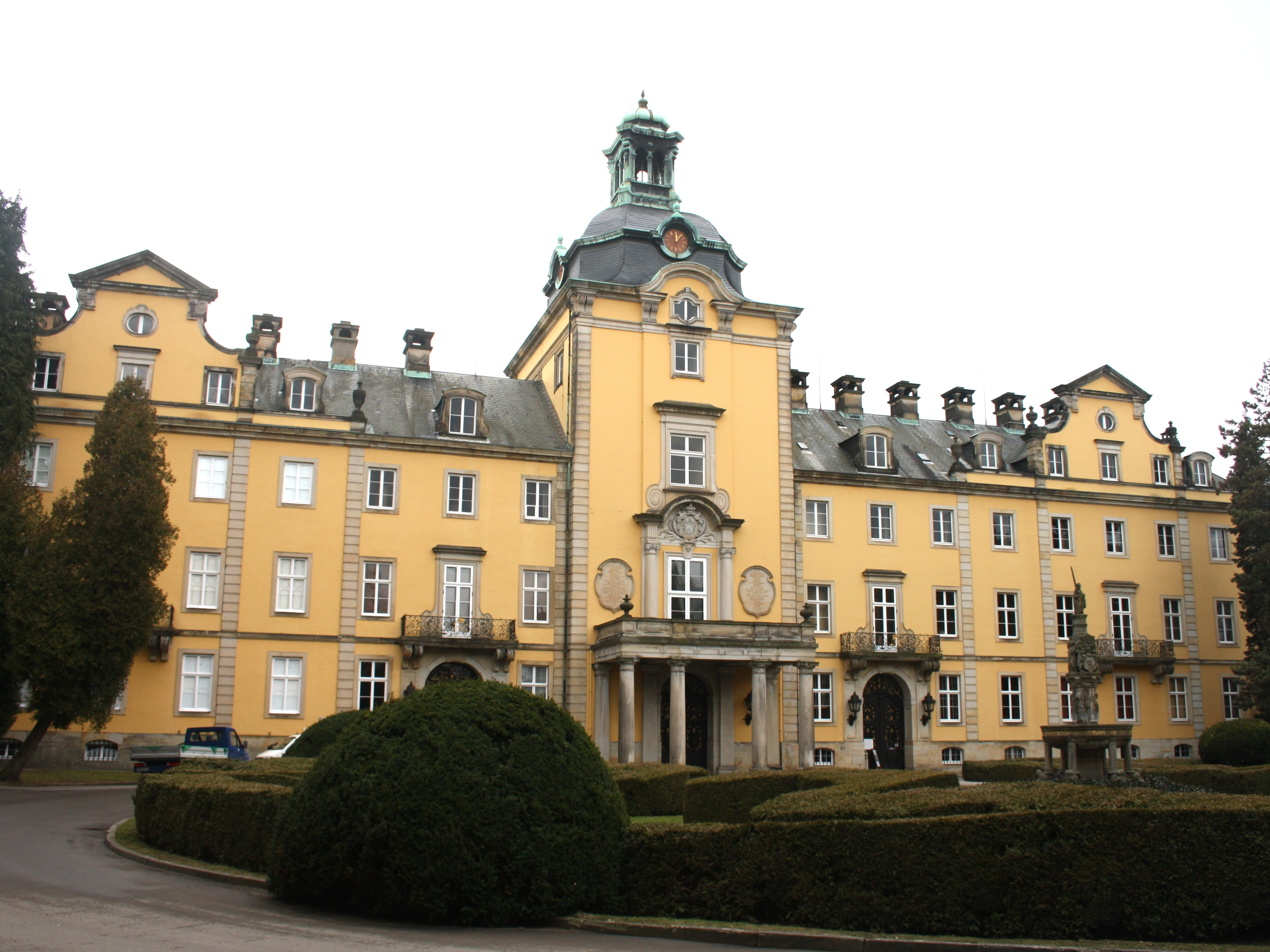
The front facade of the palace.

The Princely Mausoleum in the palace grounds is open to the public as well. Built in 1915 in Neo-Romanic style and resembling the Roman Pantheon, it is the world's largest private sepulchre still in use. The cupola is adorned by an impressive gold mosaic, the second largest of its kind after the one in the Hagia Sophia.

In the period around 1950 when the Royal Air Force had a base nearby, the children of the service families attended a school in the Schloss.

=== Helicopter Museum ===
Bückeburg is also home to a helicopter museum, which features the early drawings of flying objects by Leonardo da Vinci as well as 40 actual helicopters. The German Army's Army Aviators School using Bückeburg Air Base is located here.

=== Bückeburg Church ===
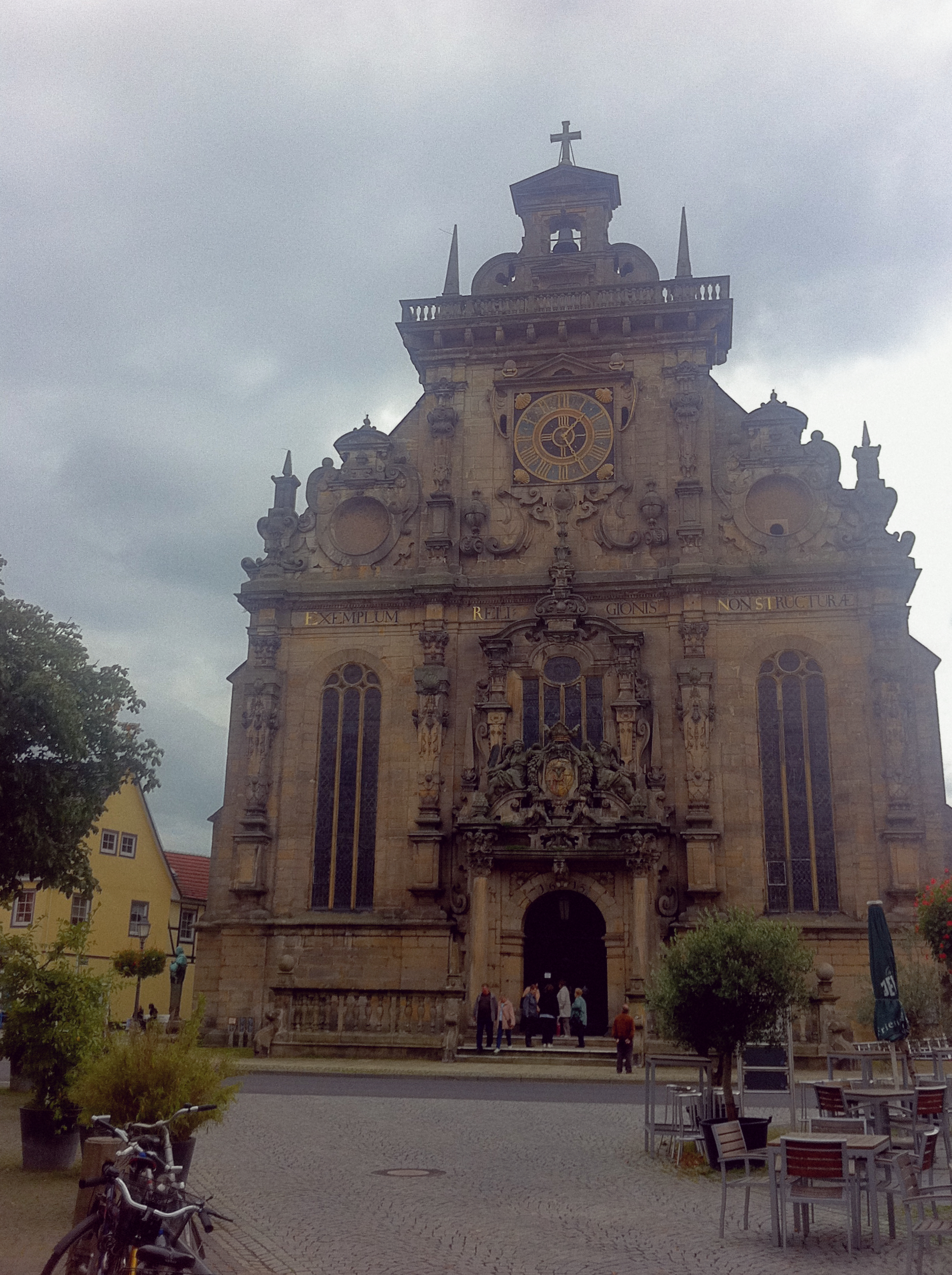
The Bückeburg town church

The Town Church of Bückeburg (Bückeburger Stadtkirche) was one of the first Lutheran churches built after the Reformation. It is known for its pulpit and especially for the ornately decorated bronze-cast font, made by the Dutch artist Adriaen de Vries. Composer Johann Christoph Friedrich Bach (1732–1795), a son of J.S. Bach, worked at the Bückeburg court from before 1751 until his death, first as a harpsichordist, then, from 1759, as Konzertmeister (director) of the Hofkapelle (court orchestra) there. Bach is buried in the churchyard of the Stadtkirchengemeinde-Bückeburg. Bach set several texts by Johann Gottfried Herder, who was at the Bückeburg court as its superintendent and chief preacher from 1771–1776.

== Climate ==
Climate data for Bückeburg (1991–2020 normals)
| Month | Jan | Feb | Mar | Apr | May | Jun | Jul | Aug | Sep | Oct | Nov | Dec | Year |
|---|---|---|---|---|---|---|---|---|---|---|---|---|---|
| Mean daily maximum °C (°F) | 4.6 (40.3) | 5.6 (42.1) | 9.3 (48.7) | 13.9 (57.0) | 18.5 (65.3) | 21.2 (70.2) | 24.0 (75.2) | 23.7 (74.7) | 19.5 (67.1) | 13.8 (56.8) | 8.2 (46.8) | 4.7 (40.5) | 13.9 (57.0) |
| Daily mean °C (°F) | 2.8 (37.0) | 3.1 (37.6) | 5.8 (42.4) | 10.0 (50.0) | 13.8 (56.8) | 16.9 (62.4) | 19.0 (66.2) | 18.7 (65.7) | 14.9 (58.8) | 10.4 (50.7) | 6.4 (43.5) | 3.5 (38.3) | 10.3 (50.5) |
| Mean daily minimum °C (°F) | −0.1 (31.8) | −0.1 (31.8) | 2.2 (36.0) | 5.0 (41.0) | 8.9 (48.0) | 11.6 (52.9) | 14.1 (57.4) | 14.0 (57.2) | 11.1 (52.0) | 7.1 (44.8) | 3.4 (38.1) | 0.3 (32.5) | 6.5 (43.7) |
| Average precipitation mm (inches) | 58.3 (2.30) | 45.2 (1.78) | 46.3 (1.82) | 40.6 (1.60) | 63.2 (2.49) | 59.0 (2.32) | 71.4 (2.81) | 76.1 (3.00) | 60.5 (2.38) | 59.7 (2.35) | 56.4 (2.22) | 56.1 (2.21) | 716.8 (28.22) |
| Average precipitation days (≥ 0.1 mm) | 18.2 | 16.1 | 15.8 | 13.6 | 13.8 | 14.7 | 15.5 | 15.1 | 13.9 | 16.0 | 17.7 | 18.4 | 191.3 |
| Average snowy days (≥ 1.0 cm) | 4.1 | 4.7 | 1.8 | 0 | 0 | 0 | 0 | 0 | 0 | 0 | 1.3 | 3.5 | 15.6 |
| Average relative humidity (%) | 82.8 | 79.7 | 75.8 | 70.1 | 69.0 | 70.2 | 69.8 | 70.7 | 76.6 | 81.5 | 84.5 | 84.6 | 76.6 |
| Mean monthly sunshine hours | 46.4 | 69.8 | 112.2 | 177.0 | 203.3 | 202.1 | 217.6 | 197.4 | 144.9 | 104.9 | 49.1 | 38.8 | 1,551.8 |
Source: NOAA

== Transport ==
Bückeburg has a railway station and is served by line S1 of the Hanover S-Bahn. There are hourly train services between Bückeburg, Minden and Hanover.

== Notable people ==
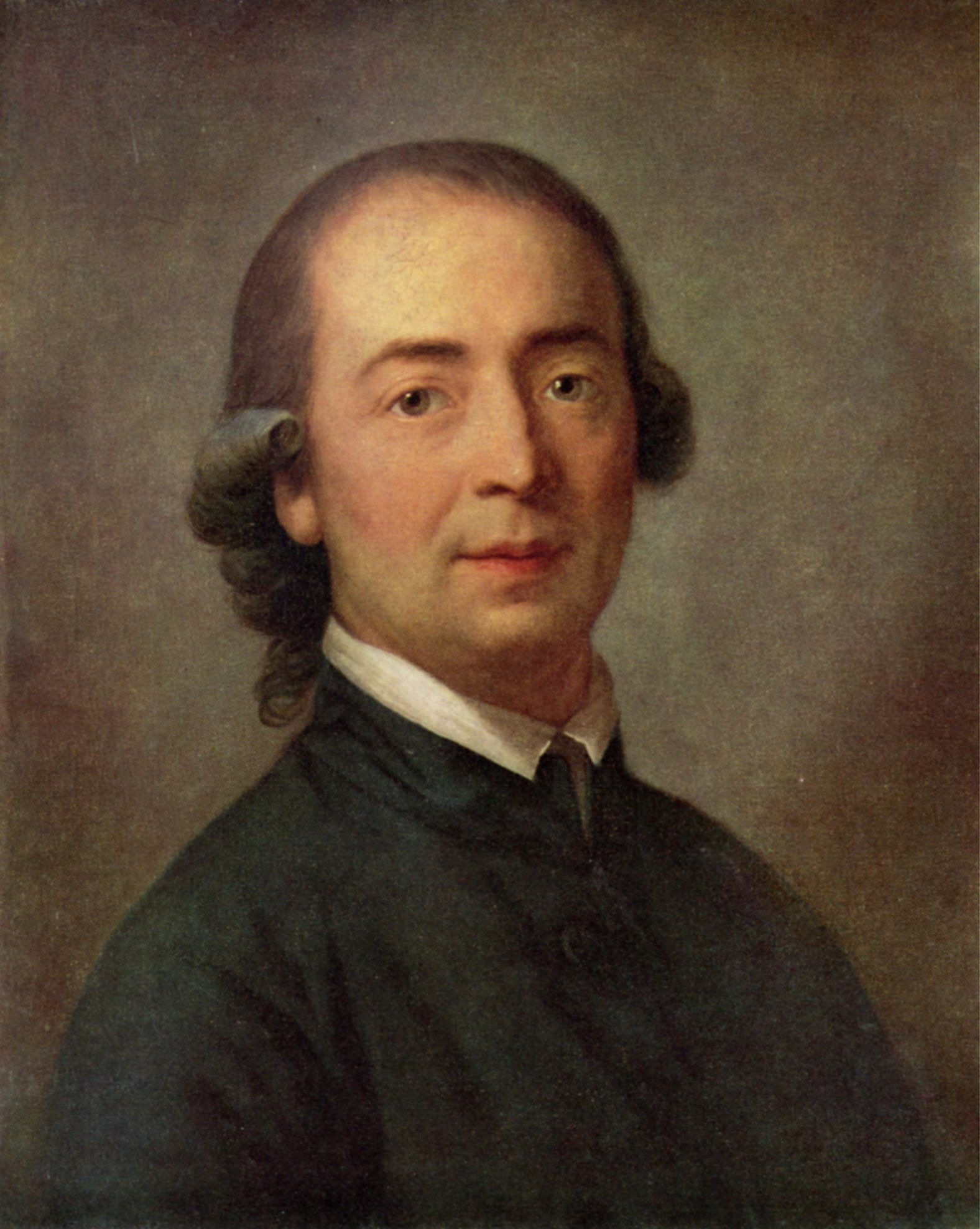
Johann Gottfried Herder, 1785

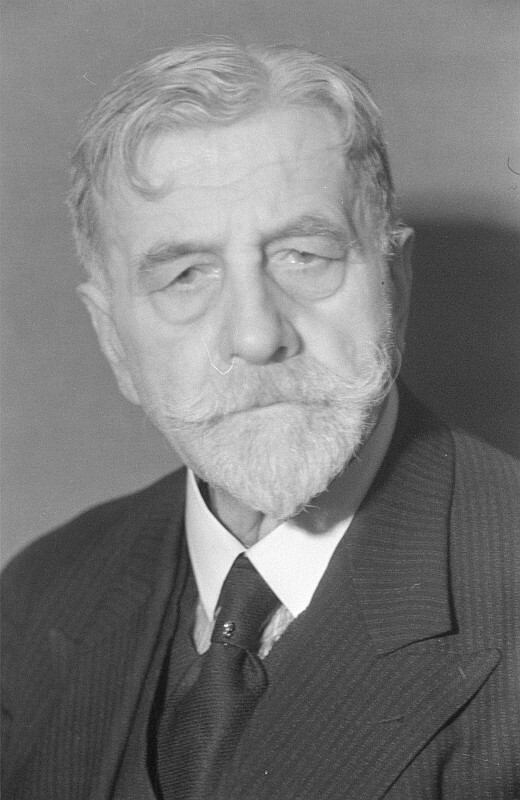
Wilhelm Külz, 1946

- Johann Christoph Friedrich Bach (1732–1795), composer, local harpsichordist and in 1759, concertmaster.
- Thomas Abbt (1738–1766), writer and philosopher, Government and consistorial council, died locally
- Johann Gottfried Herder (1744–1803), poet, theologian and philosopher, worked from 1771 to 1775 as the main preacher, superintendent and consistorial councilor in Bückeburg
- Friedrich Accum (1769–1838), chemist, worked on gas lighting
- August von Herder (1776–1838), geologist and mineralogist
- Iwan Müller (1786–1854), composer and instrument maker, died locally
- Heinrich Strack (1805–1880), architect
- Theodore Otto Langerfeldt (1841–1906), German-American architectural renderer, water-colourist, and painter.
- Hermann Löns (1866–1914), journalist and writer, from 1907 to 1909 editor of the local newspaper
- Lulu von Strauss und Torney (1873-1956), poet and writer
- Wilhelm Külz (1875–1948), politician, local mayor from 1904 to 1912, lord mayor from 1909; national minister from 1926
- Ernst Torgler (1893–1963), politician, from 1929 to 1933 KPD faction chairman; defendant in the Reichstagsbrand process; worked locally from 1945 until 1948 in city admin.
- Karl Lieffen (1926–1999), actor, trained at the local Army Music School
- Hans Blum (1928-2024), pianist, bassist, composer, trained at the local Army Music School
- James Last (1929–2015), bassist, composer and bandleader, was trained at the local Army Music School
- Horst Fischer (1930–1986), trumpeter, trained at the local Army Music School
- Reinhold Kauder (born 1950), slalom canoeist, team silver medallist at the 1972 Summer Olympics
- Timo Maas (born 1969), musician and remixer
- Gernot Döllner (born 1969), engineer, business executive and CEO of AUDI AG.
- Robert Palikuča (born 1978), a Croatian football executive and former player, played over 270 games

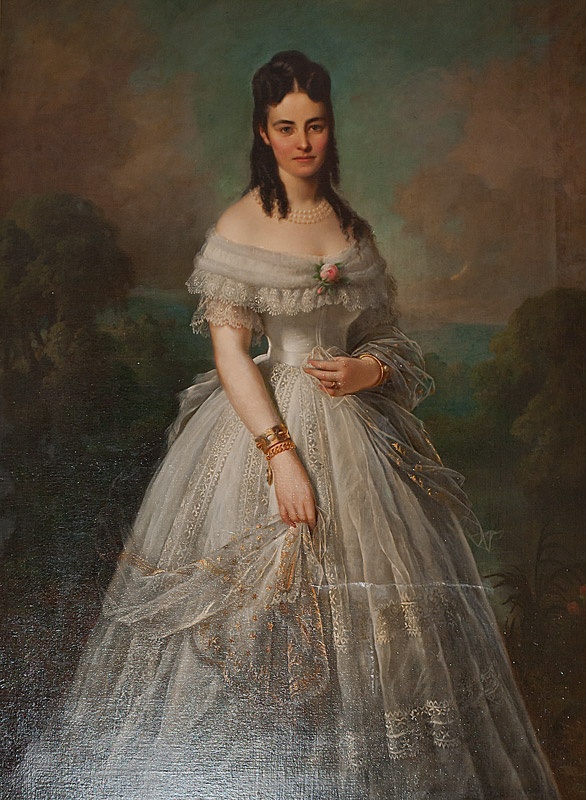
Princess Hermine of Schaumburg-Lippe, ca.1860

=== Royalty and Nobility ===
- Friedrich Christian, Count of Schaumburg-Lippe (1655–1728), second ruler of the County of Schaumburg-Lippe.
- Albrecht Wolfgang, Count of Schaumburg-Lippe (1699–1748), ruler of the County of Schaumburg-Lippe.
- Georg Wilhelm, Prince of Schaumburg-Lippe (1784–1860), a Count and later Prince of Schaumburg-Lippe.
- Louise, Baroness Lehzen (1784–1870), from 1814 to 1842 the governess and later companion to Queen Victoria; lived from locally 1842 to 1870
- Viktor von Strauß und Torney (1809-1899), a princely minister, church poet and Ehrenbürger of Dresden.
- Adolphus I, Prince of Schaumburg-Lippe (1817–1893), ruler of the Principality of Schaumburg-Lippe.
- Princess Adelheid of Schaumburg-Lippe (1821–1899), was a member of the House of Schaumburg-Lippe
- Prince William of Schaumburg-Lippe (1834–1906), member of the House of Lippe.
- Princess Hermine of Schaumburg-Lippe (1845–1930), member of the princely family of Schaumburg-Lippe
- George, Prince of Schaumburg-Lippe (1846–1911), ruler of the Principality of Schaumburg-Lippe
- Karl von Plettenberg (1852–1938), general of the infantry, lived in Bückeburg
- Prince Adolf of Schaumburg-Lippe (1859–1916), prince of the House of Schaumburg-Lippe
