= Württembergisches Palais =

Neoclassical-style palace in Germany

Coordinates: 49°01′20″N 12°04′58″E

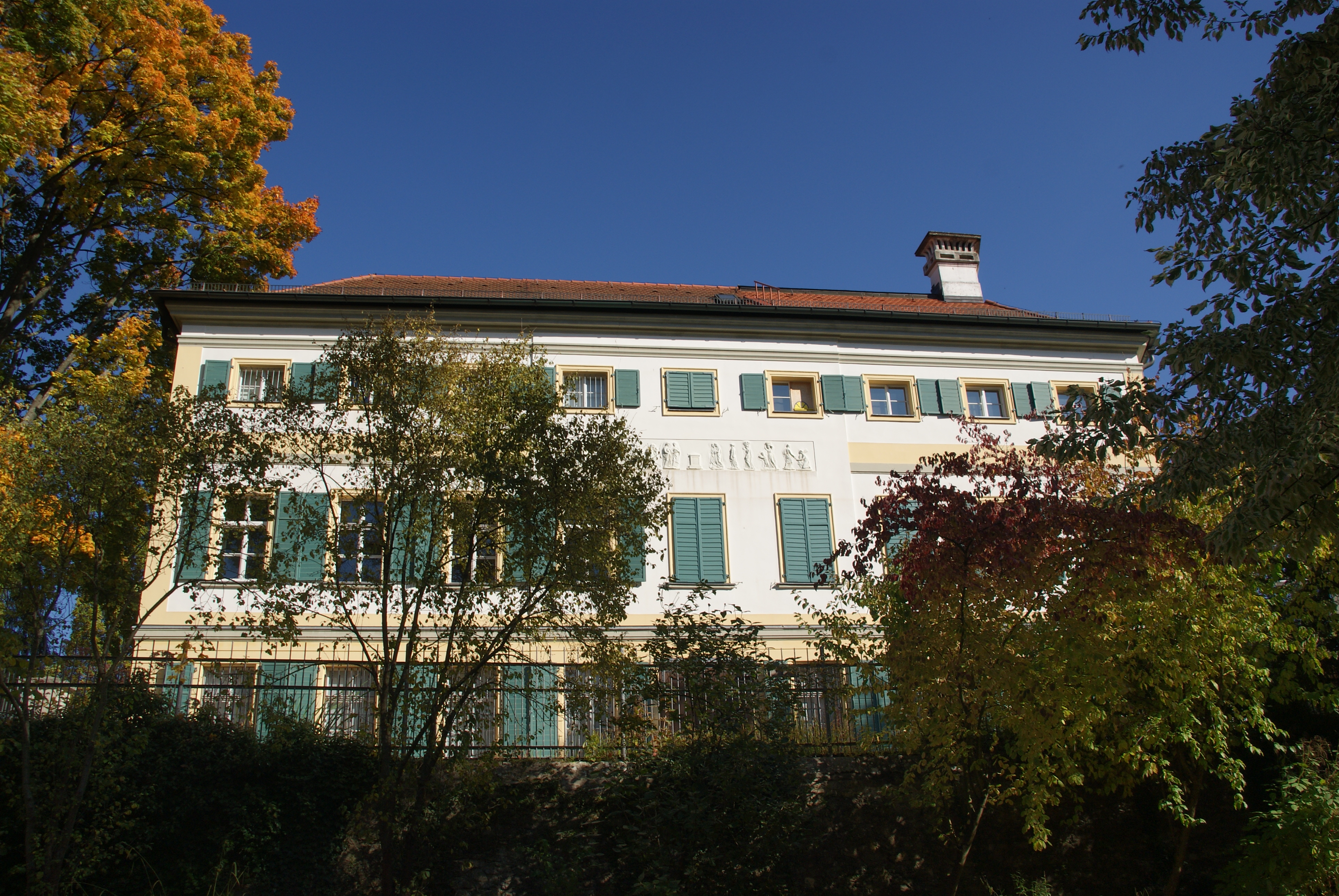
Württembergisches Palais

The Württembergisches Palais (also known as the Herzogspalais) is an early 19th-century Neoclassical-style palace in the Western District (German: Westenviertel) of Regensburg in Bavaria's Upper Palatinate. The palace complex includes the Herzogspark, a municipal park with a Renaissance garden and a medieval tower known as the Prebrunnturm. Württembergisches Palais is the seat of the Natural History Museum of East Bavaria (German: Naturkundemuseum Ostbayern).

== History ==
In 1804, the finance director of the Princely House of Thurn and Taxis, Georg Friedrich Ritter von Müller, acquired the site of the present Herzogspark, which at that time marked the outskirts of Regensburg. According to its specifications, it connected to the adjacent estates of the princely house and created a park. In the southern part of the park, master builder Emanuel Herigoyen constructed the present palace for Karl Theodor Anton Maria von Dalberg. Construction of the palace was completed in 1806.

After Müller's death in 1843, Maximilian Karl, 6th Prince of Thurn and Taxis's sister Duchess Maria Sophia of Württemberg acquired the palace and made it her residence following her divorce from Duke Paul Wilhelm of Württemberg. It is from Maria Sophia that the palace takes its present name, Württembergisches Palais.

The city of Regensburg acquired the palace and its surrounding park in 1932. Regensburg left the property to the Natural History Society of Regensburg (German: Naturwissenschaftlichen Verein Regensburg) in 1961 because of its extensive collection of gardens. From 1986 to 1991, the palace underwent extensive renovations.

== Architecture ==
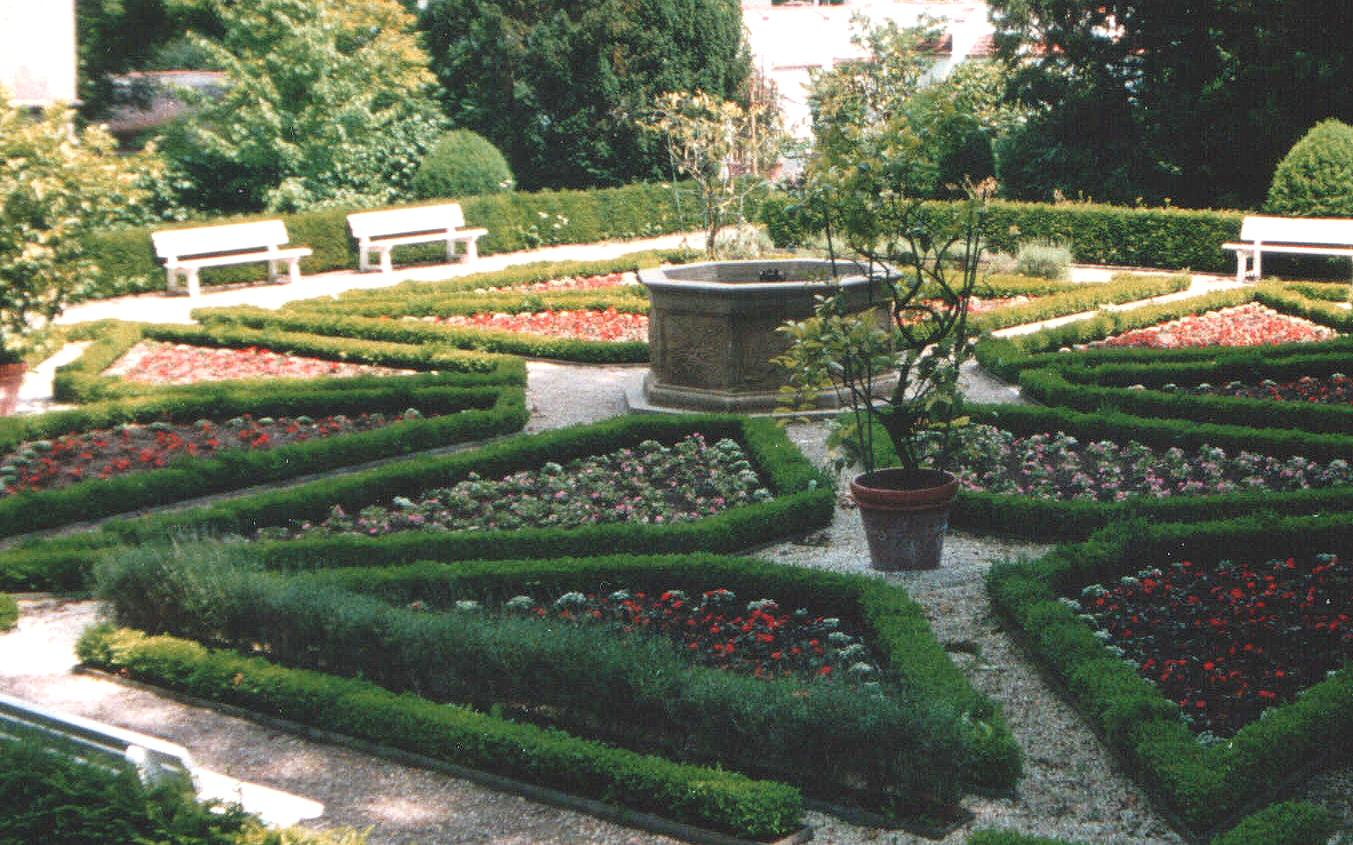
The Renaissance garden in the Herzogspark, adjacent to Württembergisches Palais

The two-story palace consists of three wings, which are obtusely linked. Also of architectural note are the roundabout oak staircase and the stucco Biedermeier elements excavated during the palace's renovation. From the palace's 60 m^{2} ballroom, visitors are able to view west into the adjacent park.

The palace houses the natural history museum's geological, botanical, and zoological exhibits, numerous antiques, and historical research apparatuses. Also housed on the property are extensive collections of old scientific prints, drawings, and books.
