= Herzogspark =

Municipal park with small botanical garden in Germany

Coordinates: 49°1′23″N 12°4′56″E

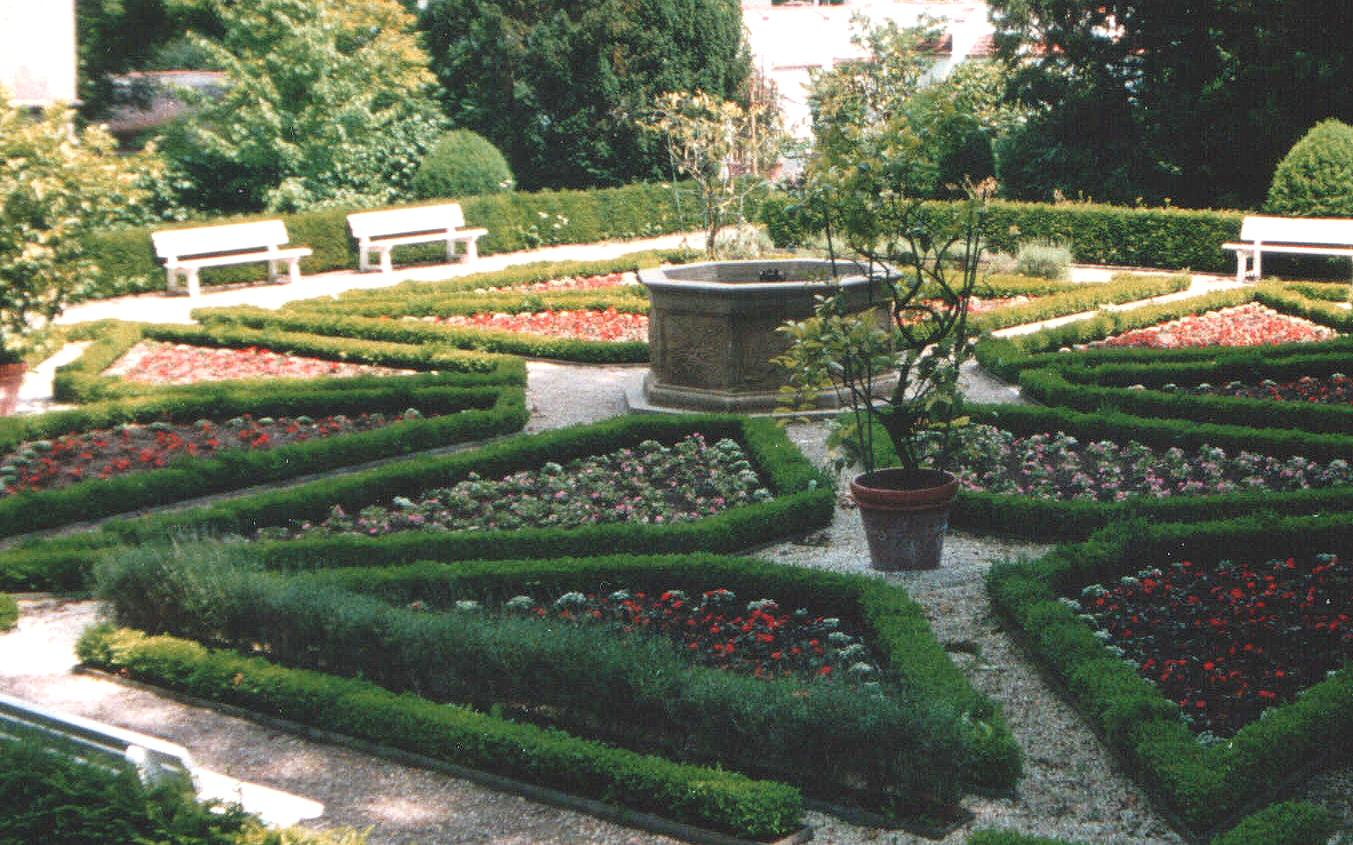
Renaissance Garden in the Herzogspark

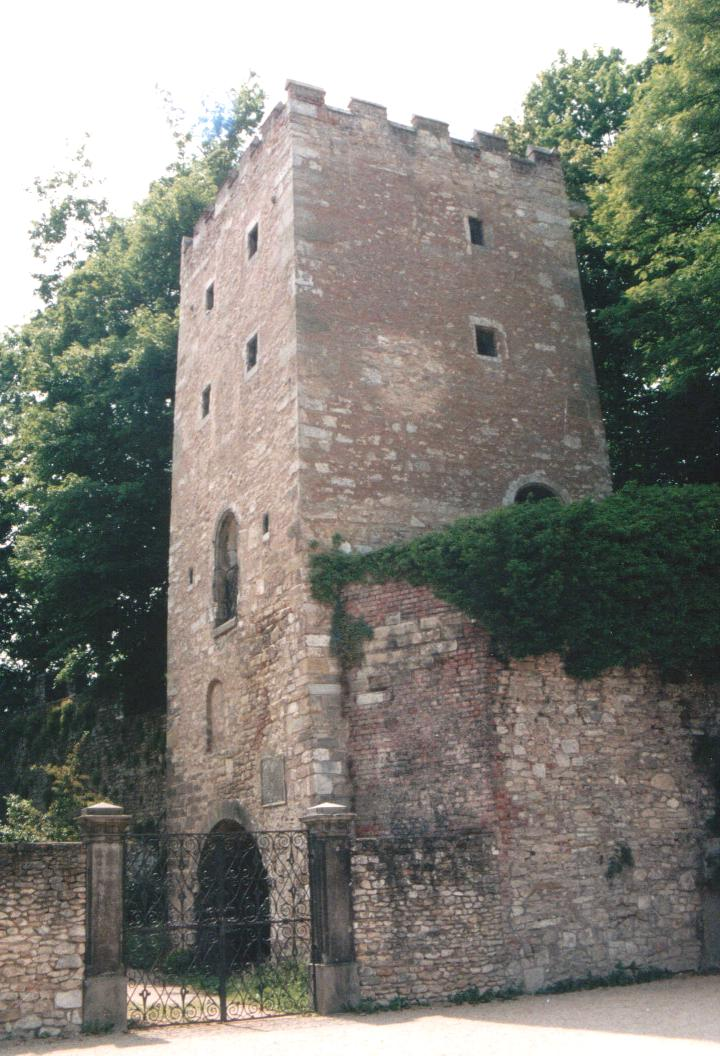
The Prebrunnturm in the Herzogspark

Herzogspark is a 1.5-hectare (3.7-acre) municipal park, with small botanical garden, located on the banks of the Danube at the western edge of the old city, at Hundsumkehr Strasse, Regensburg, Bavaria, Germany.

The park dates to 1293, when a new wall was constructed after enlargement of the city. Its moat now forms part of the landscape. The site became a private garden in 1804, subsequently owned by the Princely House of Thurn and Taxis, and served its Württembergisches Palais served as the residence of Duchess Maria Sophia of Württemberg (née Princess of Thurn and Taxis). It 1935 it became municipal property, and in 1950-1952 was converted to a public park. Today it contains the following major features:

- The Prebrunnturm - A square medieval tower dating to 1293, open in the summer.
- Several small botanical gardens - an alpine garden with bell flowers, carnations, gentians, rhododendrons, primroses, etc.; rhododendron collection in the former moat; rose garden; lily pond with goldfish; and garden of southern plants.
- Renaissance garden - A new garden in the Renaissance style of geometric parterres edged by low boxwood hedges, with a Shakespeare garden along one hedge.

The adjacent Württembergisches Palais is now the Natural History Museum of Eastern Bavaria, and consists of three interconnected wings devoted to mineralogy, paleontology, zoology, and botany.

== See also ==
- List of botanical gardens in Germany
