= Viktor von Strauß und Torney =

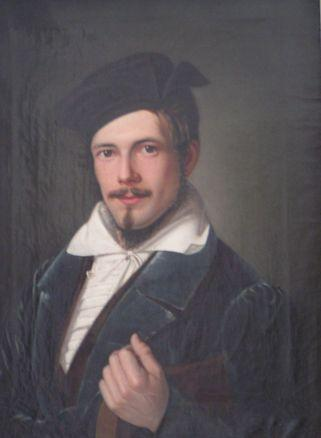
Picture of Victor von Strauß

Friedrich Viktor Strauß (Victor Strauss), from 1852 von Strauß, and from 1872 von Strauß und Torney (Bückeburg, 18 September 1809 – 1 April 1899 in Dresden) was a princely minister, church poet, and Ehrenbürger of Dresden. He had a D. theol. degree from Leipzig University, and was known as a scholar of religious history and translator from Chinese. In 1870 he published the first scientifically recognized German translation of the Tao Te Ching, and in 1880 the first complete German translation of the Classic of Poetry.

He made a contribution to Germany gypsy romance literature genre with the story of Tuvia Panti, in the tragicomic novella Mitteilungen aus den Akten betreffend den Zigeuner Tuvia Panti aus Ungarn (1871).

== Selected works ==
- Victor von Strauss: Laò-Tsè’s Taò Tĕ Kīng. Friedrich Fleischer, Leipzig 1870; new edition as "Victor von Strauß: Lao-Tse. Tao Tê King", edited and introduced by W. Y. Tonn. Manesse, Zürich 1951. (translation and comments revised)
