= Karl Alexander, 5th Prince of Thurn and Taxis =

Karl Alexander
- Prince of Thurn and Taxis
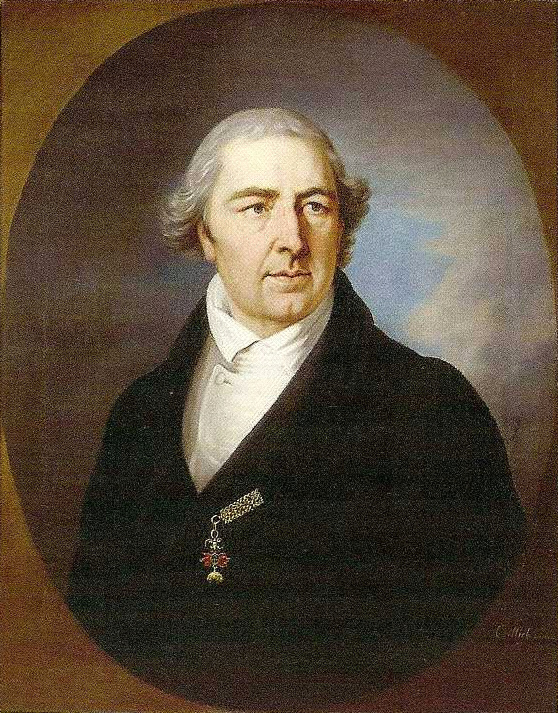

Head of the House of Thurn and Taxis
- Period: 13 November 1805 – 15 July 1827
- Predecessor: Karl Anselm
- Successor: Maximilian Karl
- Born: 22 February 1770; Imperial City of Regensburg, Kingdom of Germany, Holy Roman Empire
- Died: 15 July 1827 (aged 57); Schloss Taxis, Dischingen, Kingdom of Württemberg
- Burial: St. Emmeram's Abbey
- Spouse: Duchess Therese of Mecklenburg-Strelitz (m. 1789)
- Issue: Princess Charlotte Luise; Prince Georg Karl; Maria Theresia, Princess Esterházy of Galántha; Princess Luise Friederike; Maria Sophia, Duchess Paul Wilhelm of Württemberg; Maximilian Karl, 6th Prince of Thurn and Taxis; Prince Friedrich Wilhelm
Names
- German: Karl Alexander
- House: Thurn and Taxis
- Father: Karl Anselm, 4th Prince of Thurn and Taxis
- Mother: Duchess Auguste of Württemberg

Karl Alexander, 5th Prince of Thurn and Taxis, full German name: Karl Alexander Fürst von Thurn und Taxis (22 February 1770 – 15 July 1827) was the fifth Prince of Thurn and Taxis, head of the Thurn-und-Taxis Post, and Head of the Princely House of Thurn and Taxis from 13 November 1805 until his death on 15 July 1827. With the death of his father on 13 November 1805, he became nominal Generalpostmeister of the Imperial Reichspost until the resignation of Francis II, Holy Roman Emperor.

== Early life ==
Karl Alexander was born as the son of Karl Anselm, 4th Prince of Thurn and Taxis and his first wife, Duchess Auguste of Württemberg. He studied at the Universities of Strasbourg, Würzburg, and Mainz and then subsequently went on a European tour. In 1797, he was appointed successor to his ailing father's position as Prinzipalkommissar at the Perpetual Imperial Diet in Regensburg. Karl Alexander also worked for the Thurn and Taxis postal empire, operating during a decline due to the gradual loss of territory as a result of the Napoleonic Wars.

== Marriage and family ==
Karl Alexander married Duchess Therese of Mecklenburg-Strelitz, fourth eldest child and third eldest daughter of Charles II, Grand Duke of Mecklenburg and Princess Friederike of Hesse-Darmstadt, on 25 May 1789 in Neustrelitz, Mecklenburg-Strelitz. Karl Alexander and Therese had seven children:

- Princess Charlotte Luise of Thurn and Taxis (24 March 1790 – 22 October 1790)
- Prince George Karl of Thurn and Taxis (26 March 1792 – 20 January 1795)
- Princess Maria Theresia of Thurn and Taxis (6 July 1794 – 18 August 1874), ancestress of Gloria, Princess of Thurn and Taxis
- Princess Luise Friederike of Thurn and Taxis (29 August 1798 – 1 December 1798)
- Princess Maria Sophia Dorothea of Thurn and Taxis (4 March 1800 – 20 December 1870)
- Maximilian Karl, 6th Prince of Thurn and Taxis (3 November 1802 – 10 November 1871)
- Prince Friedrich Wilhelm of Thurn and Taxis (29 January 1805 – 7 September 1825)

== Continuation of the post ==
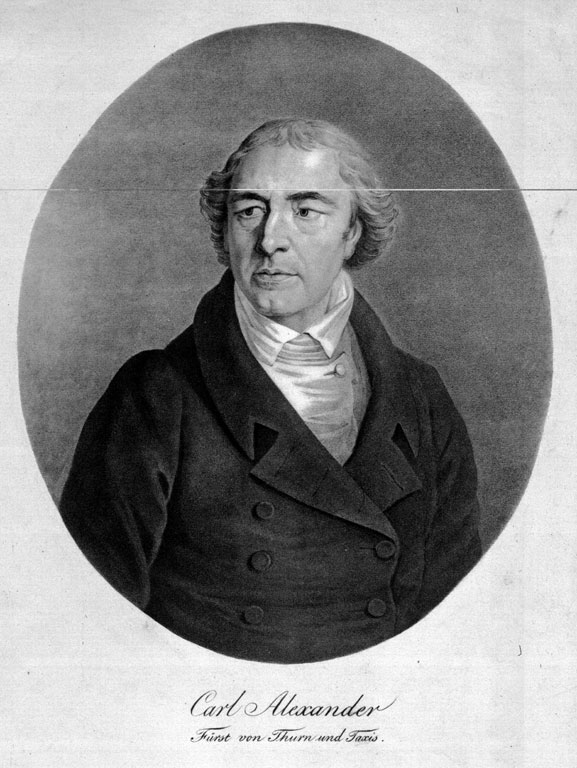
Karl Alexander, 5th Prince of Thurn and Taxis

After the end of the Holy Roman Empire, the Thurn and Taxis postal system continued to survive as a private company. Since 1806, Karl Alexander headed a private postal company, the Thurn-und-Taxis Post. It existed first as a feud of some of the Confederation of the Rhine members, such as Baden, Bavaria, and Württemberg. Bavaria nationalised the postal system two years later. After the Congress of Vienna, Karl Alexander took over the Hessian and Thuringian postal services, as well as those in the Hanseatic League cities of Bremen, Hamburg, and Lübeck, and Schaffhausen. From 1820, the company began to prosper again, so Karl Alexander began to acquire large amounts of land holdings.

== Acquisition of new land ==
According to the Confederation of the Rhine Act, agreed upon between Napoleon I of France and the Confederation of the Rhine princes, the Principality of Thurn and Taxis lost its independence and was mediatised in 1806. Since then, the Princes of Thurn and Taxis and hence Karl Alexander, depending on the territory, were subjects of either the King of Württemberg, or the Princes of Hohenzollern-Sigmaringen. In return, the House of Thurn and Taxis received the Imperial Abbey of St. Emmeram and associated territories in Regensburg. Karl Alexander also received as the family head of the House of Thurn and Taxis, Prussian possessions in the Grand Duchy of Poland. In 1822/23, he bought from the Count Kinsky and others the Burg Reichenburg in Liberec Bohemia.

== Ancestry ==
Ancestors of Karl Alexander, 5th Prince of Thurn and Taxis

8. Anselm Franz, 2nd Prince of Thurn and Taxis
4. Alexander Ferdinand, 3rd Prince of Thurn and Taxis
9. Maria Ludovika Anna Franziska, Princess of Lobkowicz
2. Karl Anselm, 4th Prince of Thurn and Taxis
10. George Frederick Charles, Margrave of Brandenburg-Bayreuth
5. Margravine Sophie Christine of Brandenburg-Bayreuth
11. Princess Dorothea of Schleswig-Holstein-Sonderburg-Beck
1. Karl Alexander, 5th Prince of Thurn and Taxis
12. Frederick Charles, Duke of Württemberg-Winnental
6. Karl Alexander, Duke of Württemberg
13. Margravine Eleonore Juliane of Brandenburg-Ansbach
3. Duchess Auguste of Württemberg
14. Anselm Franz, 2nd Prince of Thurn and Taxis (= 8)
7. Princess Maria Augusta of Thurn and Taxis
15. Maria Ludovika Anna Franziska, Princess of Lobkowicz (= 9)

Karl Alexander, 5th Prince of Thurn and Taxis House of Thurn and Taxis Cadet branch of the House of Tassis Born: 22 February 1770 Died: 15 July 1827
German nobility
Preceded by Karl Anselm	Prince of Thurn and Taxis; 13 November 1805 – 15 July 1827	Succeeded by Maximilian Karl
Postal offices
Preceded by Karl Anselm as Postmaster General of the Holy Roman Empire	Postmaster General of the Thurn-und-Taxis Post; 1806 – 15 July 1827	Succeeded by Maximilian Karl
