= Panti' =

Chickasaw mythological creature

In Chickasaw mythology, Panti is a fabulous beast with exceptionally lovely teeth which it will exchange for lost baby teeth. It is similar to creatures like the Tooth Fairy and Ratoncito Pérez.
