= Pagal (poem) =

Poem by Laxmi Prasad Devkota

- by Laxmi Prasad Devkota
- Original title: पागल
- Written: 1953
- Country: Nepal
- Language: Nepali

Pagal (Nepali: पागल, lit. 'The Lunatic') is a 1953 poem by Nepalese writer Laxmi Prasad Devkota.

In 1939, Devkota's brothers admitted him to a mental hospital in Ranchi, British India where he stayed at the hospital for five months.

Pagal was published in 1953 and it was translated to English as The Lunatic by Laxmi Prasad Devkota in 1956.

Pagal is one of the popular poems in Nepal and it is sometimes regarded as a classic poem of Nepali literature.
