= Panti, Prayagraj =

Village in Uttar Pradesh, India

Panti is a village in Prayagraj, Uttar Pradesh, India.
