= Linda Pagli =

Italian computer scientist

Linda Pagli (born 1950) is an Italian computer scientist specializing in computer networks and distributed algorithms. She is a professor at the University of Pisa, and a Fellow of the Italian Academy for Advanced Studies in America. She has also worked with UNESCO and the Italian Ministry of Foreign Affairs to help spread expertise in computer science to developing countries.

== Education and career ==
Pagli was born in Livorno, and earned a laurea from the University of Pisa in 1973. She remained at Pisa as a researcher until 1987, when she obtained a full professorship at the University of Salerno, and returned to Pisa as a professor in 1990.

== Books ==
Pagli is the author of the text Mathematical and Algorithmic Foundations of the Internet (with Fabrizio Luccio and Graham Steel, CRC Press, 2011). She is also the author of several Italian-language books, including:

- Reti logiche e calcolatore (with Luccio, Bollati Boringhieri, 1991) ISBN 8833954870
- Storia matematica della rete: dagli antichi codici all'era di internet (Mathematical history of the network: from the ancient codes to the Internet age, with Luccio, Bollati Boringhieri, 2007) ISBN 978-8833917856
- Algoritmi, divinità e gente comune (with Luccio, ETS, 2012) ISBN 8846732162
- Problemi, algoritmi e coding. Le magie dell'informatica (with Pierluigi Crescenzi, Zanichelli, 2017). ISBN 978-8808320889

Her book Storia matematica della rete was a finalist for the Galileo Prize for scientific communication in 2008.
