= PaGaLGuY =

Online tutoring platform based in India

- Available in: Indian; English
- Headquarters: 228, Champaklal Industrial Estate, Next to Sion MTNL Exchange, Sion (East), Mumbai
- Country of origin: India
- Owner: Inzane Labs Private Limited
- Founder: Allwin Angel
- Key people: Sandeep Kalidindi (CTO)
- Industry: EdTech
- Website: pagalguy.com
- Registration: Yes
- Users: ▲400,000
- Launched: 2002; 24 years ago
- Current status: Active

PaGaLGuY is an India-based educational services company headquartered in Mumbai. It operates an online platform designed for students and offers an educational app, Prepathon, which provides resources for online learning.

== History ==
The website was founded in 2002 by an India's MBA student Allwin Agnel. Initially, the website was an easy-to-use education discussion forum.

In 2009, PaGaLGuY launched India's largest B-school rankings initiative. The project was a response to a growing need of both MBA aspirants and recruiters for a credible rating of B-schools.

On 12 December 2009, community members announced a protest against the government for a scam involving medical exams held in India. The students called the test unfair, inconsistent and chaotic, and alleged that the questions were leaked even as the examination was underway.

In 2010, PaGaLGuY launched an MBA affiliate program, enabling students to register on the platform and apply to multiple colleges through a single interface. An applicant's status can be tracked, and he or she can correspond with institutes and pay application fees via the portal.

In July 2012, the website was relaunched incorporating social networking features to its platform, changing from a forum website to a social network.

In January 2016, the company launched an interactive test preparation learning application called Prepathon. The application raised undisclosed Series A funding in May, and in July received media coverage for its use of automated bots.

In July 2018, PaGaLGuY was covered as one of the top 11 brand by CNBC as a part of its book Booming Brands – The Inspiring Story of 11 'Made in India' Brands
