= Duchess Therese of Mecklenburg-Strelitz =

Duchess Therese
- Princess of Thurn and Taxis
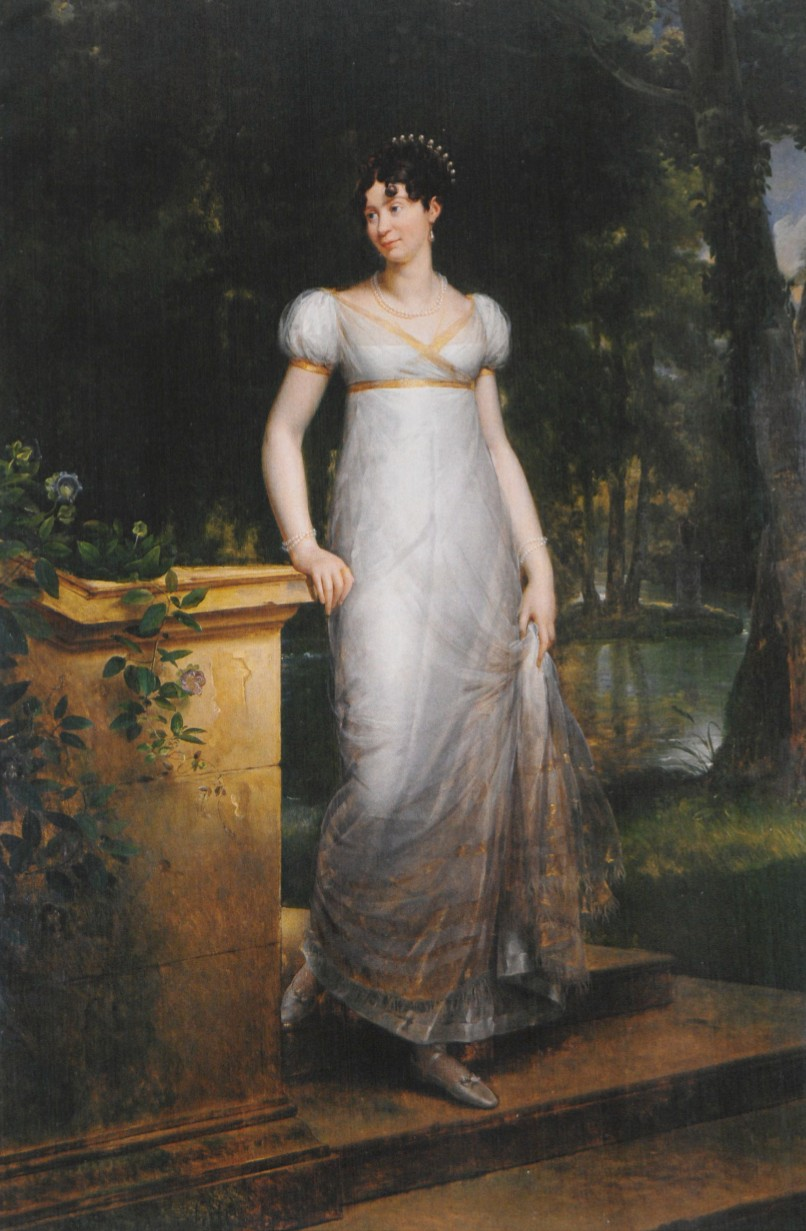
- Portrait by François Gérard, c. 1810

Princess consort of Thurn and Taxis
- Tenure: 25 May 1789 – 15 July 1827
- Born: 5 April 1773; Hanover, Electorate of Hanover
- Died: 12 February 1839 (aged 65); Regensburg, Kingdom of Bavaria
- Burial: St. Emmeram's Abbey
- Spouse: Karl Alexander, 5th Prince of Thurn and Taxis (m. 1789; died 1827)
- Issue: Princess Charlotte Luise; Prince Georg Karl; Maria Theresia, Princess Esterházy of Galántha; Princess Luise Friederike; Maria Sophia, Duchess of Württemberg; Maximilian Karl, 6th Prince of Thurn and Taxis; Prince Friedrich Wilhelm; Amalie Adlerberg (illegitimate)
Names
- German: Therese Mathilde Amalia
- House: Mecklenburg-Strelitz
- Father: Charles II, Grand Duke of Mecklenburg-Strelitz
- Mother: Princess Friederike of Hesse-Darmstadt

Duchess Therese Mathilde Amalie of Mecklenburg-Strelitz (German: Herzogin Therese Mathilde Amalie zu Mecklenburg-Strelitz; 5 April 1773 – 12 February 1839) was a member of the House of Mecklenburg-Strelitz and a Duchess of Mecklenburg. Through her marriage to Karl Alexander, 5th Prince of Thurn and Taxis, Therese was also a member of the House of Thurn and Taxis.

== Family ==
Therese Mathilde Amalie of Mecklenburg was born in Hanover the daughter of Duke Charles of Mecklenburg and his first wife Princess Friederike of Hesse-Darmstadt.

Therese married Karl Alexander, Hereditary Prince of Thurn and Taxis, son of Karl Anselm, 4th Prince of Thurn and Taxis and his wife Duchess Auguste of Württemberg, on 25 May 1789 in Neustrelitz, Mecklenburg-Strelitz. Therese's paternal aunt Queen Charlotte and her husband George III of the United Kingdom helped broker the marriage, in particular ensuring that Therese would be able to keep her Protestant faith. Therese and Karl Alexander had seven children:

- Princess Charlotte Luise of Thurn and Taxis (24 March 1790 – 22 October 1790)
- Prince George Karl of Thurn and Taxis (26 March 1792 – 20 January 1795)
- Princess Maria Theresia of Thurn and Taxis (6 July 1794 – 18 August 1874)
- Princess Luise Friederike of Thurn and Taxis (29 August 1798 – 1 December 1798)
- Princess Maria Sophia Dorothea of Thurn and Taxis (4 March 1800 – 20 December 1870)
- Maximilian Karl, 6th Prince of Thurn and Taxis (3 November 1802 – 10 November 1871)
- Prince Friedrich Wilhelm of Thurn and Taxis (29 January 1805 – 7 September 1825)

Therese also had illegitimate issue by Maximilian, Count von und zu Lerchenfeld auf Köfering und Schönberg (München, 17 January 1772 – Kassel, 19 October 1809), who married on 25 May 1789 Maria Anna Philippine Walburga Groschlag von Dieburg, by whom he had one son; one was created Graf von Stockau; the others were surnamed von Stargard. Children include:

- Georg Adolf, Graf von Stockau (Dresden, Saxony, 6 May 1806 – Napajedl castle, Maehren, 4 April 1865, bur. crypt, Napajedl castle chapel, Maehren), a Lutheran, married on 25 November 1830 to Franziska de Paula Maria Elisabeth, Gräfin von Fünfkirchen (Vienna, Austria, 24 July 1801 – Napajedl castle, Maehren, 14 May 1870, bur. crypt, Napajedl castle chapel, Maehren), a Roman Catholic, heiress of Napajedl castle and estate in Maehren, widow of Clemens Graf von Kesselstatt, and had issue, now seemingly extinct in male line
- Amalie von Sternfeld (Regensburg, 16 June 1808 – Tegernsee, 21 June 1888), married at Köfering, 31 August 1825 to Georg-Alexander, Freiherr von Krüdener (1786–1852), and had issue

In 1790 Anne-César, Chevalier de la Luzerne, the French ambassador to Great Britain, reported that Therese's husband was being considered for the new throne of the Austrian Netherlands and that Therese's aunt Queen Charlotte would support this; these turned out to be unfounded rumors, as Charlotte and her husband George III believed Karl Alexander of insufficient rank for kingship. After the mediatization of the Principality of Thurn and Taxis to the Kingdom of Bavaria in 1806 during the German Mediatisations, the end of the Holy Roman Empire and creation of the Confederation of the Rhine, and the subsequent end of the Imperial Reichspost, Therese's initiative and negotiating skills were influential in maintaining the Thurn and Taxis-run postal system as the private company, Thurn-und-Taxis-Post. Like her sister, Louise, Queen consort of Prussia, she failed in their negotiations with Napoleon I of France, but during the Congress of Vienna, she was successful in enforcing the interests of the Thurn and Taxis family.

== Political activities ==
Therese and Karl Alexander had their first residence (until 1797) in the Palais Thurn und Taxis in Frankfurt am Main. Early on in their marriage, Therese took over her young husband's representational tasks. After her father-in-law's resignation as Post Master General and Principal Commissioner of the Perpetual Imperial Diet at Regensburg, Therese's husband Karl Alexander became Principal Commissioner in 1797. Therese took an active role in the administration of the Princely House and lands as well as the postal administration and was also devoted to art and literature. She hosted in her salon poets and writers including Jean Paul, Friedrich Rückert, Johann Kaspar Lavater, and Friedrich Gottlieb Klopstock.

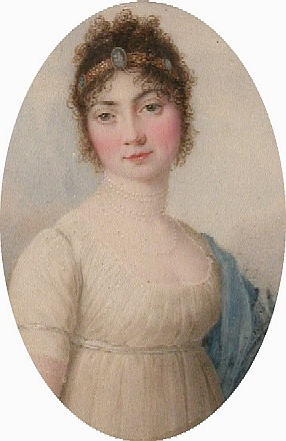
The Hereditary Princess of Thurn and Taxis, oil on canvas by Carlo Restallino, Regensburg in 1800.

Only with the predictable demise of the Imperial Reichspost, the German Mediatisations of 1803, the mediatization of the Princely House of Thurn and Taxis, and the loss of position of Post Master General in the time of Napoleon I of France, Therese became outwardly politically active, most especially after the death of her father-in-law in 1805. Since then, Therese reinforced the sovereignty of the Princely House of Thurn and Taxis and its traditional postal rights. In 1806, she and her husband negotiated with her brother-in-law Frederick William III of Prussia along with Karl Theodor Anton Maria von Dalberg, the former Archbishop-Elector of Mainz and Prince-Primate of Regensburg, and for the first time in 1807 with Napoleon. Likewise, they also negotiated with Maximilian I Joseph of Bavaria in Munich and proposed to him the nationalization of the Thurn and Taxis Lehnspost there. In 1808, Therese and her husband took the interests of the Princely House of Thurn and Taxis to the Congress of Erfurt. There, a secret meeting occurred between Charles Maurice de Talleyrand-Périgord and Alexander I of Russia in her salon.

After fruitless negotiations in Erfurt were lost, Therese traveled at the end of 1809 to Paris, where she met with Napoleon concerning the future status of the Princely House of Thurn and Taxis, the withdrawal of the media, and the re-acquisition of rights to the postal system. From this trip survives a correspondence with her husband Karl Alexander in which he laments the impoverishment of the House of Thurn and Taxis and asks Therese to limit her expenses. Through their negotiations with Napoleon, the Princely House of Thurn and Taxis was offered to relocate to Paris. The negotiations failed, however, perhaps because the correspondence with her sister Queen Louise of Prussia fell into the hands of the French authorities.

After the defeat and exile of Napoleon, Therese took the interests of the Princely House to the Congress of Vienna in 1814 where many political negotiations took place between Talleyrand, Tsar Alexander I, Klemens Wenzel, Prince von Metternich, and other political leaders in her salon. Not least because of Article 17 of the Federal Act from the year 1815, the revenue of the former post offices of the House of Thurn and Taxis in several states of the German Confederation as a legitimate claim was established. Private postal services were established and were intended to have a reasonable compensation obligation to the Princely House of Thurn and Taxis.

Duchess Therese died in Taxis, Regensburg, at the age of 65.

== Ancestry ==
Ancestors of Duchess Therese of Mecklenburg-Strelitz

8. Adolf Frederick II, Duke of Mecklenburg-Strelitz
4. Duke Charles Louis Frederick of Mecklenburg
9. Princess Christiane Emilie of Schwarzburg-Sondershausen
2. Charles II, Grand Duke of Mecklenburg
10. Ernest Frederick I, Duke of Saxe-Hildburghausen
5. Princess Elisabeth Albertine of Saxe-Hildburghausen
11. Countess Sophia Albertine of Erbach-Erbach
1. Duchess Therese of Mecklenburg-Strelitz
12. Louis VIII, Landgrave of Hesse-Darmstadt
6. Prince George William of Hesse-Darmstadt
13. Countess Charlotte of Hanau-Lichtenberg
3. Princess Friederike of Hesse-Darmstadt
14. Count Christian Karl Reinhard of Leiningen-Dachsburg-Falkenburg-Heidesheim
7. Countess Maria Louise Albertine of Leiningen-Falkenburg-Dagsburg
15. Countess Catharine Polyxene of Solms-Rödelheim and Assenheim

== Literature ==
- Wolfgang Behringer (1990), Thurn und Taxis, Die Geschichte ihrer Post und ihrer Unternehmen (in German), München, Zürich, ISBN 3-492-03336-9
- Martin Dallmeier; Martha Schad (1996), Das Fürstliche Haus Thurn und Taxis, 300 Jahre Geschichte in Bildern (in German), Regensburg: Verlag Friedrich Pustet, ISBN 3-7917-1492-9
- Ludwig Kalmus (1937), Weltgeschichte der Post (in German), Wien: Verlag Amon Franz Göth
- Max Piendl (1981), Das Fürstliche Haus Thurn und Taxis, Zur Geschichte des Hauses und der Thurn und Taxis-Post (in German), Regensburg: Verlag Friedrich Pustet
- Rudolf Reiser (1975), "Mathilde Therese von Thurn und Taxis (1773–1839)", Zeitschrift für Bayerische Landeskunde (in German), vol. 38, pp. 739–748

Duchess Therese of Mecklenburg-Strelitz House of Mecklenburg-Strelitz Cadet branch of the House of Mecklenburg Born: 5 April 1773 Died: 12 February 1839
German nobility
| Preceded by Duchess Auguste of Württemberg | Princess consort of Thurn and Taxis; 13 November 1805 – 15 July 1827 | Succeeded by Baroness Wilhelmine of Dörnberg |
