= Princess Friederike of Hesse-Darmstadt =

Princess Friederike
- Duchess Charles of Mecklenburg-Strelitz
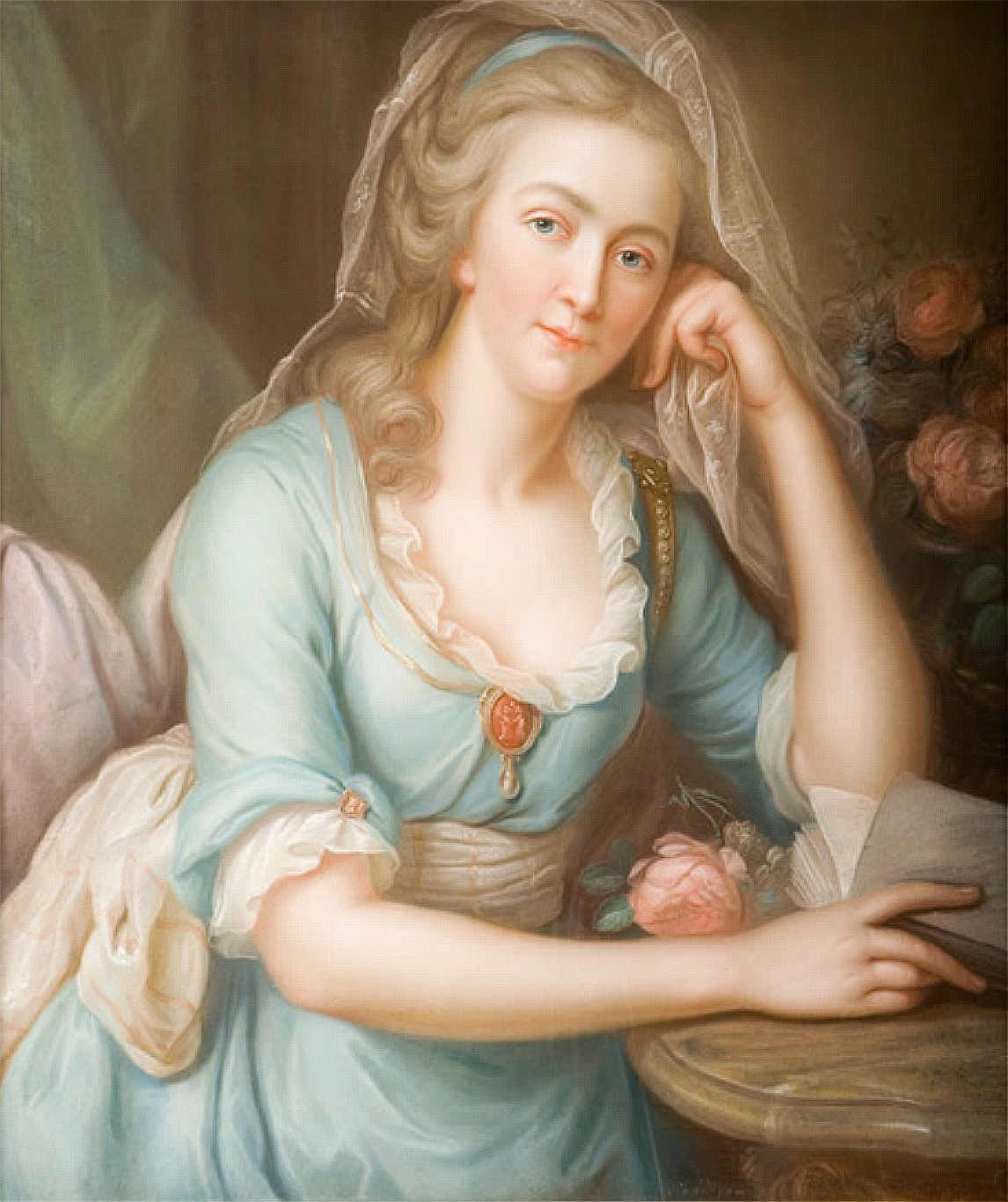
- Born: 20 August 1752; Darmstadt, Landgraviate of Hesse-Darmstadt, Holy Roman Empire
- Died: 22 May 1782 (aged 29); Hanover, Electorate of Brunswick-Lüneburg, Holy Roman Empire
- Spouse: Charles II, Grand Duke of Mecklenburg-Strelitz (m. 1768)
- Issue: Charlotte Georgine, Duchess of Saxe-Hildburghausen; Duchess Caroline Auguste; Duke Georg Carl; Therese, Princess of Thurn and Taxis; Duke Friedrich Georg; Louise, Queen of Prussia; Frederica, Queen of Hanover; George, Grand Duke of Mecklenburg-Strelitz; Duke Friedrich Karl; Duchess Auguste Albertine
Names
- Friederike Caroline Luise
- House: Hesse-Darmstadt
- Father: Prince George William of Hesse-Darmstadt
- Mother: Countess Maria Louise Albertine of Leiningen-Falkenburg-Dagsburg

Princess Friederike Caroline Luise of Hesse-Darmstadt (20 August 1752 – 22 May 1782) was a member of the House of Hesse and by marriage a Duchess of Mecklenburg-Strelitz.

== Life ==
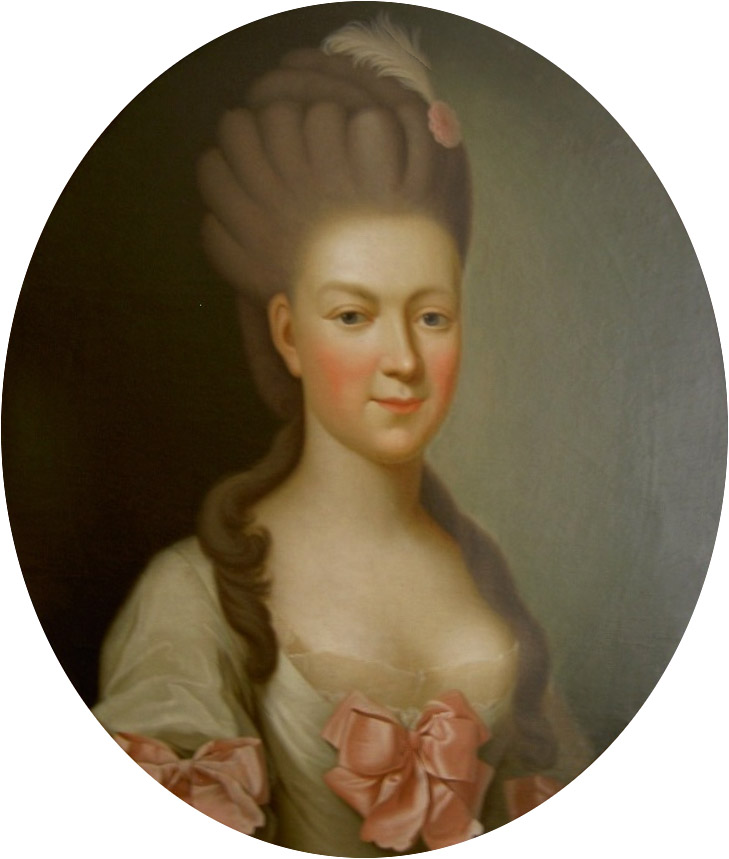
Princess Frederica Louisa Caroline of Mecklenburg-Strelitz

Friederike was born in Darmstadt, the eldest daughter of Prince George William of Hesse-Darmstadt, second son of Louis VIII, Landgrave of Hesse-Darmstadt, and his wife, Countess Maria Louise Albertine of Leiningen-Falkenburg-Dagsburg.

Friederike married Duke Charles of Mecklenburg-Strelitz on 18 September 1768 in Darmstadt. After her death, Charles married her younger sister Charlotte in 1784.

Friederike died in 1782 in Hanover (where Charles was field marshal of the household brigade), three days after giving birth to her tenth child, Augusta, who lived just one day. Friederike is buried in the royal crypt of the church of St. John the Baptist in Mirow.

== Issue ==
Issue

Name	Portrait	Lifespan	Notes
Duchess Charlotte Georgine; Duchess of Saxe-Hildburghausen		17 November 1769 – 14 May 1818	Married in 1785 to Frederick, Duke of Saxe-Altenburg and had issue;
Duchess Karoline Auguste		17 February 1771 – 11 January 1773	Died in infancy
Duke Georg Karl		4 March 1772 – 21 May 1773	Died in infancy
Duchess Therese Mathilde; Princess of Thurn and Taxis		5 April 1773 – 12 February 1839	Married Prince Karl Alexander of Thurn and Taxis and had issue;
Duke Friedrich Georg		1 September 1774 – 5 November 1774	Died in infancy
Duchess Louise Auguste; Queen of Prussia		10 March 1776 – 19 July 1810	Married in 1793 to Frederick William III of Prussia and had issue;
Duchess Frederica Louise; Princess of Prussia; Princess of Solms-Braunfels; Queen of Hanover		3 March 1778 – 29 June 1841	Married first in 1793 Prince Louis Charles of Prussia and had issue; married second in 1798 to Prince Frederick William of Solms-Braunfels and had issue; married third in 1815 to Ernest Augustus, King of Hanover, and had issue;
George Friedrich; Grand Duke of Mecklenburg		12 August 1779 – September 1860	Married in 1817 Princess Marie of Hesse-Kassel and had issue;
Duke Friedrich Karl		7 January 1781 – 24 March 1783	Died in infancy
Duchess Auguste Albertine		19 May 1782 – 20 May 1782	Died in infancy

== Ancestry ==
Ancestors of Princess Friederike of Hesse-Darmstadt

8. Ernest Louis, Landgrave of Hesse-Darmstadt
4. Louis VIII, Landgrave of Hesse-Darmstadt
9. Princess Dorothea Charlotte of Brandenburg-Ansbach
2. Prince George William of Hesse-Darmstadt
10. Johann Reinhard III, Count of Hanau-Lichtenberg
5. Countess Charlotte of Hanau-Lichtenberg
11. Princess Dorothea Friederike of Brandenburg-Ansbach
1. Princess Friederike of Hesse-Darmstadt
12. Johann, Count of Leiningen-Dagsburg-Falkenburg
6. Count Christian Karl Reinhard of Leiningen-Dagsburg-Falkenburg
13. Countess Johanna Magdalene of Hanau-Lichtenberg
3. Countess Maria Louise Albertine of Leiningen-Dagsburg-Falkenburg
14. Count Georg Ludwig of Solms-Rödelheim
7. Countess Katharina Polyxena of Solms-Rödelheim
15. Countess Charlotte Sibylle of Ahlefeldt
