= Taxis Castle (Trugenhofen) =

Coordinates: 48°41′34″N 10°22′07″E

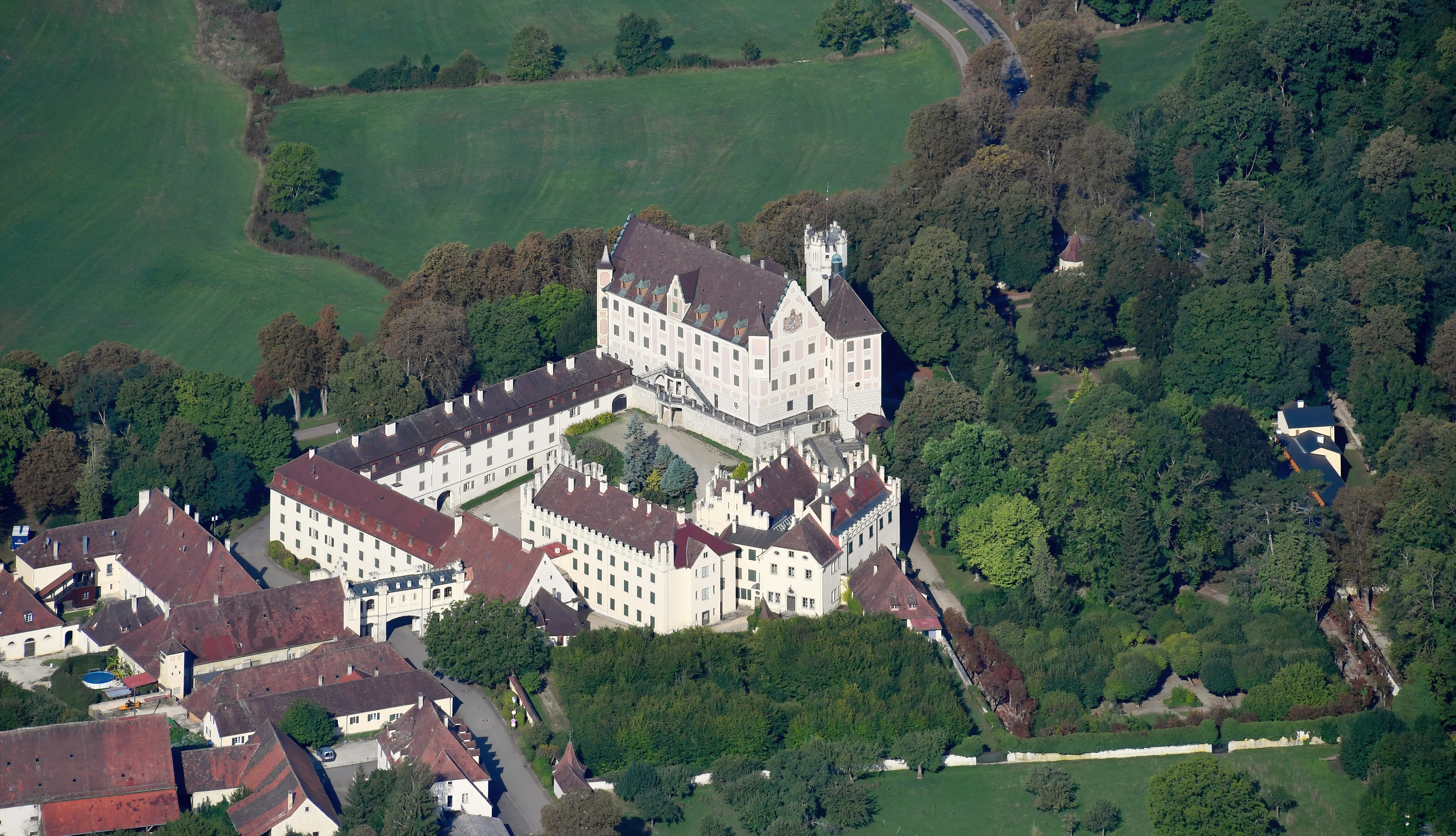
Aerial view of Schloss Taxis

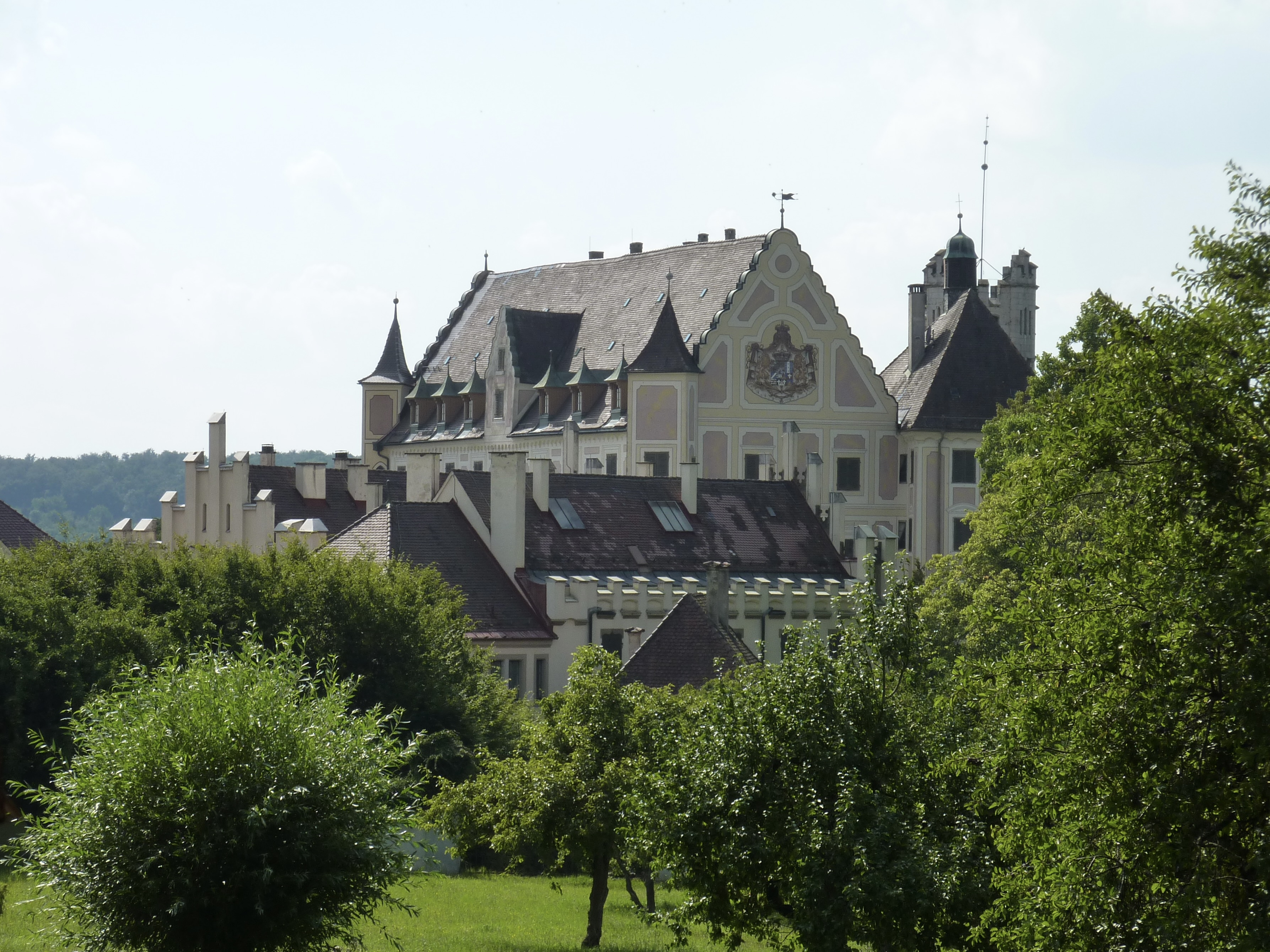
Schloss Taxis

Schloss Taxis (originally known as Burg Trugenhofen) is a privately owned castle in Dischingen in the Heidenheim district of Baden-Württemberg in Germany. The castle is owned by the princely house of Thurn und Taxis and is not open for visitors.

== History ==
Originally built in the 13th century for the von Trugenhofen family, the castle was later owned by the Öttingern, the Helfenstein and the Katzenstein families. In 1734, it was inherited by the princely house of Thurn and Taxis. The family expanded the Burg (a medieval fortification) into a Schloss (English: castle; an ornate and comfortable building). In addition to expanding the original buildings, English gardens and terraces were added.
