= Princess Sophie Friederike of Thurn and Taxis =

- Princess Sophie Friederike Radziwiłł
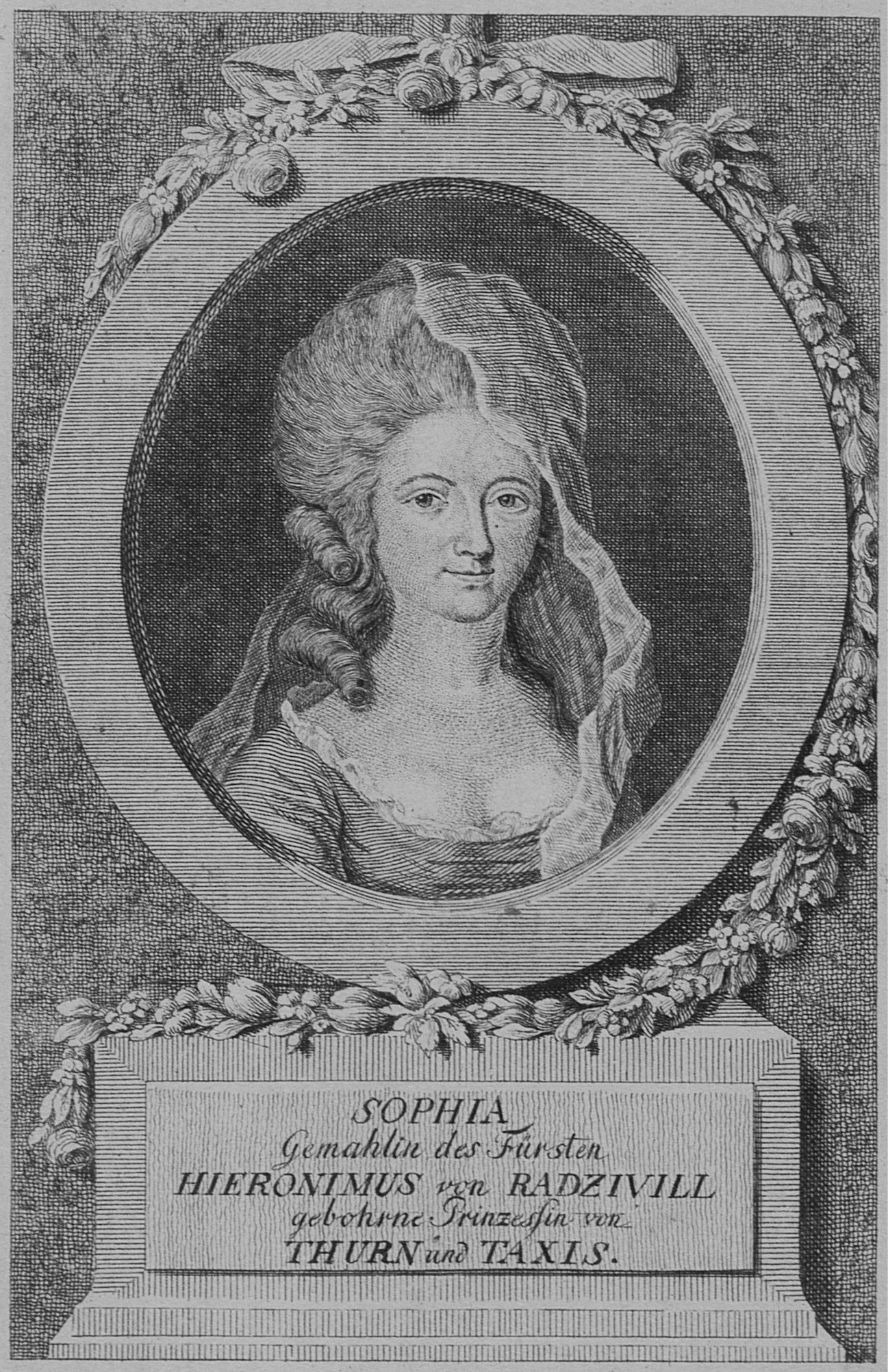
- Born: 20 July 1758; Regensburg, Free Imperial City of Regensburg, Holy Roman Empire
- Died: 31 May 1800 (aged 41)
- Spouse: Prince Hieronim Wincenty Radziwiłł; Prince Kazanowski; Count Ostroróg
- Issue: Prince Dominik Hieronim Radziwiłł
Names
- German: Sophie Friederike Dorothea Henriette
- House: House of Thurn and Taxis; House of Radziwiłł; House of Kazanowski; House of Ostroróg
- Father: Karl Anselm, 4th Prince of Thurn and Taxis
- Mother: Duchess Auguste of Württemberg

Princess Sophie Friederike Dorothea Henriette of Thurn and Taxis, (20 July 1758 – 31 May 1800) was a member of the House of Thurn and Taxis and a Princess of Thurn and Taxis by birth. She was also a member of the House of Radziwiłł and Princess Radziwiłł through her marriage to Prince Hieronim Wincenty Radziwiłł. Sophie Friederike was briefly a member of the Kazanowski and Ostroróg Polish noble families through subsequent marriages. She was known as "the Jewel of Regensburg."

== Family ==
Sophie Friederike was the second child and daughter of Karl Anselm, 4th Prince of Thurn and Taxis and his wife Duchess Auguste of Württemberg. She was an elder sister of Karl Alexander, 5th Prince of Thurn and Taxis.

== Marriage and issue ==
Sophie Friederike married Prince Hieronim Wincenty Radziwiłł, son of Michał Kazimierz "Rybeńko" Radziwiłł and his wife Anna Luiza Mycielska, on 31 December 1775 in Regensburg, Free Imperial City of Regensburg, Holy Roman Empire. Sophie Friederike and Hieronim Wincenty had one son:

- Prince Dominik Hieronim Radziwiłł (4 August 1786 – 11 November 1813)

Sophie Friederike married for a second time to Prince Andrzej Kazanowski around 1795 and for a third time to Count Mikołaj Ostroróg around 1797.

== Ancestry ==
Ancestors of Princess Sophie Friederike of Thurn and Taxis

8. Anselm Franz, 2nd Prince of Thurn and Taxis
4. Alexander Ferdinand, 3rd Prince of Thurn and Taxis
9. Maria Ludovika Anna Franziska, Princess of Lobkowicz
2. Karl Anselm, 4th Prince of Thurn and Taxis
10. George Frederick Charles, Margrave of Brandenburg-Bayreuth
5. Margravine Sophie Christine of Brandenburg-Bayreuth
11. Princess Dorothea of Schleswig-Holstein-Sonderburg-Beck
1. Princess Sophie Friederike of Thurn and Taxis
12. Frederick Charles, Duke of Württemberg-Winnental
6. Karl Alexander, Duke of Württemberg
13. Margravine Eleonore Juliane of Brandenburg-Ansbach
3. Duchess Auguste of Württemberg
14. Anselm Franz, 2nd Prince of Thurn and Taxis (= 8)
7. Princess Maria Augusta of Thurn and Taxis
15. Maria Ludovika Anna Franziska, Princess of Lobkowicz (= 9)
