= Dominik Hieronim Radziwiłł =

Polish noble (1786–1813)

Prince Dominik Hieronim Radziwiłł
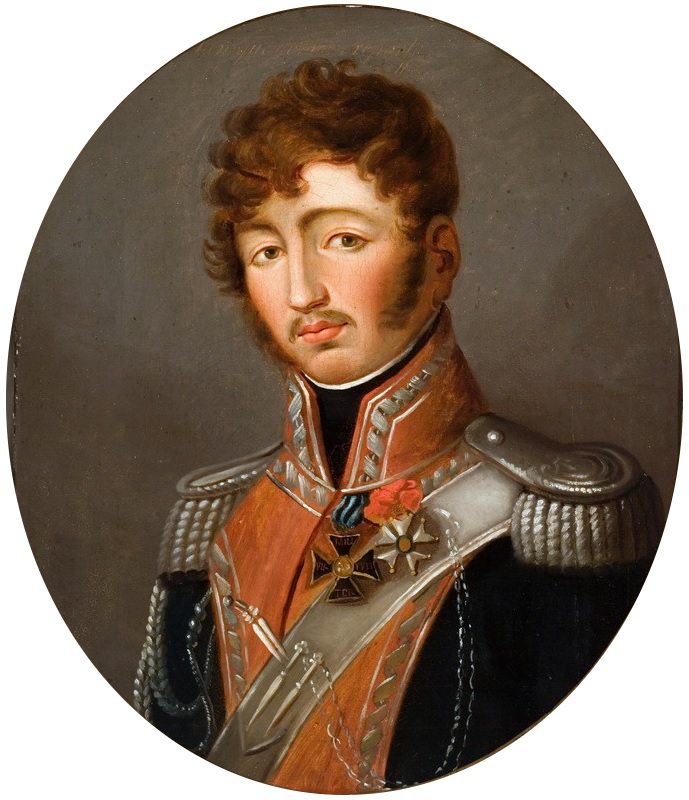
- Born: 4 August 1786; Biała Podlaska
- Died: 11 November 1813 (aged 27); Near Hanau
- Noble family: Radziwiłł
- Spouses: Teresa Mniszech; Teofilia Morawska
- Issue: Aleksander Dominik Radziwiłł; Stefania Radziwiłł
- Father: Hieronim Wincenty Radziwiłł
- Mother: Princess Sophie Friederike of Thurn and Taxis

Prince Dominik Hieronim Radziwiłł (Lithuanian: Dominykas Jeronimas Radvila; Belarusian: Дамінік Геранім Радзівіл; Polish: Dominik Hieronim Radziwiłł; 4 August 1786 – 11 November 1813) was a Polish-Lithuanian nobleman who was Ordynat of Nesvizh and Olyka and owner of Biržai, Dubingiai, Słuck and Kapyl estates. He took part in Napoleon's invasion of Russia in 1812 and later died of wounds after the Battle of Hanau.

== Early life ==
Dominik was born on 4 August 1786 in Biała Podlaska. He was the only son of Prince Hieronim Wincenty Radziwiłł (1759–1786) and his wife, Princess Sophie Friederike of Thurn and Taxis (1758–1800), of the Nesvizh line of the family. His father was Count of Kleck, the Great Cupbearer of Lithuania from 1779 and Governor of Minsk. After his father's death in September 1786, shortly after his birth, his mother remarried to Prince Andrzej Kazanowski and, after his death, to Count Mikołaj Ostroróg before her death in 1800.

His paternal grandparents were Prince Michał Kazimierz "Rybeńko" Radziwiłł and Anna Luiza Mycielska. His maternal grandparents were Karl Anselm, 4th Prince of Thurn and Taxis and Duchess Auguste of Württemberg (a daughter of Charles Alexander, Duke of Württemberg, who governed the Kingdom of Serbia as regent from 1720 until 1733).

== Career ==
Dominik was Ordynat of Nesvizh and Olyka and owner of Biržai, Dubingiai, Słuck and Kapyl estates. He fought in the Polish Legion on Napoleons' side and took part in Napoleon's invasion of Russia in 1812 and later died of wounds after the Battle of Hanau. Because of his involvement with Napoleon, Alexander I of Russia had confiscated his whole property. Only because of Prussia's intervention (since Dominik's cousin, Antoni Radziwiłł, was married to a Prussian princess) were the Radziwiłłs able to keep the family trust properties, while Mir Castle and 18,000 km^{2} of land passed to Dominik's only legitimate child, Princess Stephania Radziwill (1809–1832), who had to marry a Russian subject, according to the Czar's order, whom she found in German Prince Ludwig zu Sayn-Wittgenstein-Sayn. The castle then passed to her daughter Princess Marie zu Sayn-Wittgenstein-Sayn (1829–1897), wife of German chancellor Chlodwig, Prince of Hohenlohe-Schillingsfürst, who was forced to sell it as a foreigner, according to newly introduced law, at the end of the 19th century.

== Personal life ==
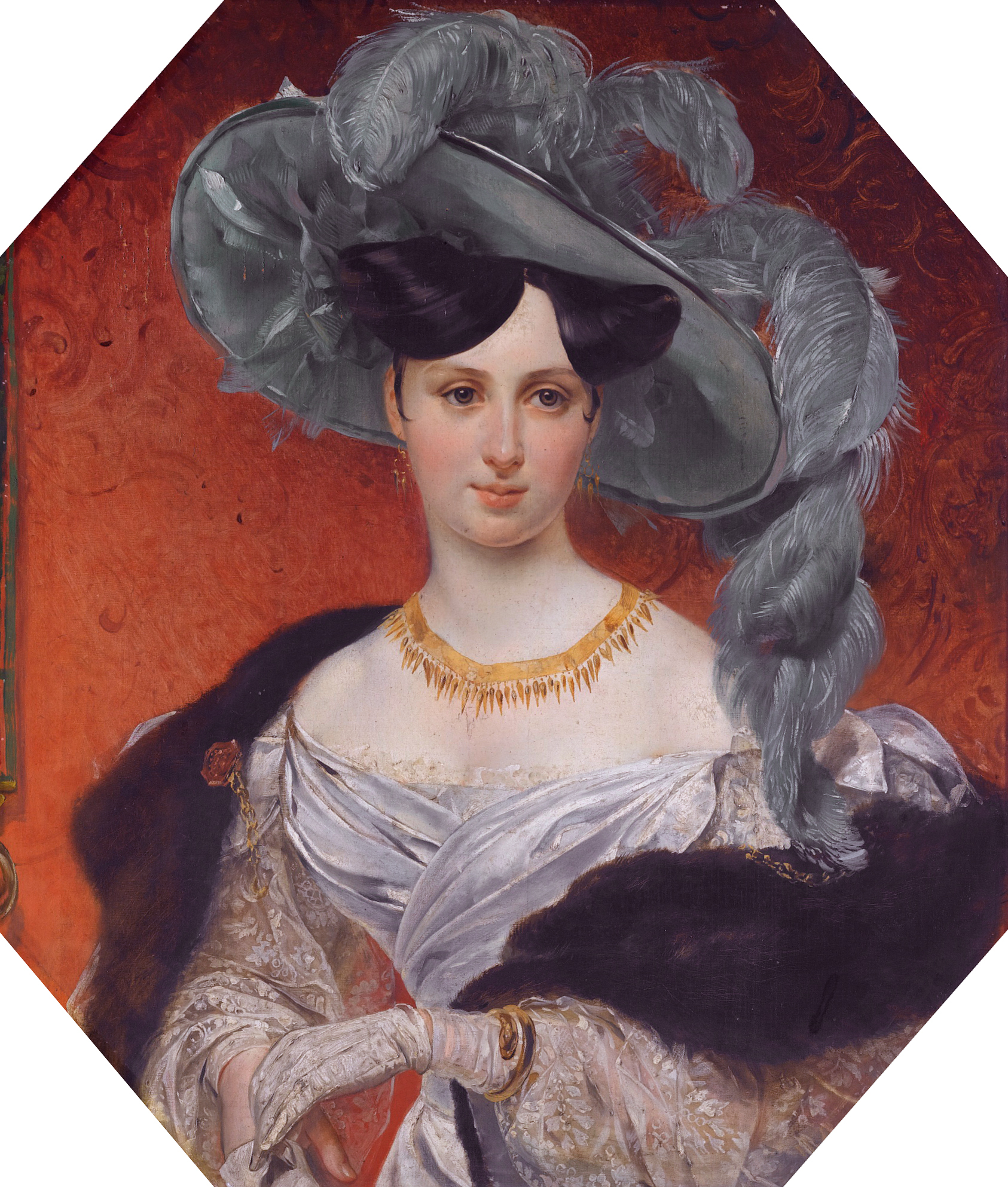
Portrait of his daughter, Princess Stefania Radziwiłł, later Princess zu Sayn-Wittgenstein-Ludwigsburg, Russian school, (first half of the 19th century)

On 3 February 1807, he married Teresa Mniszech (1790–1852), a daughter of Count Michał Jerzy Mniszech and Countess Urszula Zamoyska (niece of King Stanisław August Poniatowski). They divorced in 1809.

On 15 March 1809, he married Teofilia Morawska (1791–1828), the former wife of Józef Starzeński (1784-1831). Together, they were the parents of:

- Aleksander Dominik Radziwiłł (1808–1859), who married Rosine Josephine Hietl.
- Caroline Stefania Radziwiłł (1809–1832), who married Prince Ludwig zu Sayn-Wittgenstein-Berleburg, a son of German-Russian Field Marshal Peter Wittgenstein, on 14 June 1828 at St. Petersburg.

Dominik died near Hanau on 11 November 1813. With the death of Dominik in 1813, the Nesvizh line lost its right to the ordynat as his only son, Aleksander Dominik, was born before his parents' marriage and was thus denied the title and inheritance of his forefathers. The ordynat of Nesvizh and Olyka fell into the hands of the younger Kletsk line, Dominik's cousin, Prince Antoni Radziwiłł.

=== Descendants ===
Through his son Aleksander (who formed the so-called Galician branch of the Radziwiłłs), he was posthumously a grandfather of Ludwig Alexander Radziwiłł (1847–1912). He and his descendants had their princely title confirmed by the Austrian Empire, however, the Galician branch of the family went extinct in 1938.

== Awards ==
- Knight of the Order of the White Eagle
- Légion d'honneur
- St.Hubertus Order
- Order of Woysko
