= Mycielski (Dołęga) =

Polish noble family

Dołęga coat of arms of the Mycielski family

Mycielski (singular masculine), Mycielska (singular feminine), Mycielscy (plural) are from a Polish noble family. The Hrabia (Count) Dołęga-Mycielscy were originally from the clan Dołęga in the Mazowieckie region of Poland.

== Family ==
- Anna Luiza Mycielska (1729-1771)
- Ignacy Mycielski (1842-1884)
- Ludwik Mycielski (1854-1926)
- Kazimierz Mycielski (1904-1980)
- Zygmunt Mycielski (1907-1987)
- Jan Mycielski (1932-)
- Maciej Mycielski (1940-)
- Martin Mycielski (1984-)
- Michael Mycielski (1982-)

== Sources ==
- Ruvigny, Marquis of, The Titled Nobility of Europe, 1914, p. 1065.
- Staszewski Janusz: Gen. Michał Mycielski i udział rodziny Mycielskich w powstaniu listopadowem, Poznań 1930;
- Stańczyk: Szlachectwo zobowiązuje (3) w: Wiadomości Wrzesińskie z 5.09.2008
- Stanisław Karwowski: Wolsztyn i jego dziedzice, Poznań 1911, s. 62;
- Magdalena Bajer: Mycielscy: Osiągnięcia naukowe i kariery akademickie nie były dla nich powodem rozstania się z tradycjami światłej części warstwy ziemiańskiej w: Rody uczone (56), Forum Akademickie-Portal środowiska akademickiego i naukowego
