= Ostroróg Castle =

Polish castle built in the Middle Ages

Coordinates: 52.6242°N 16.4511°E

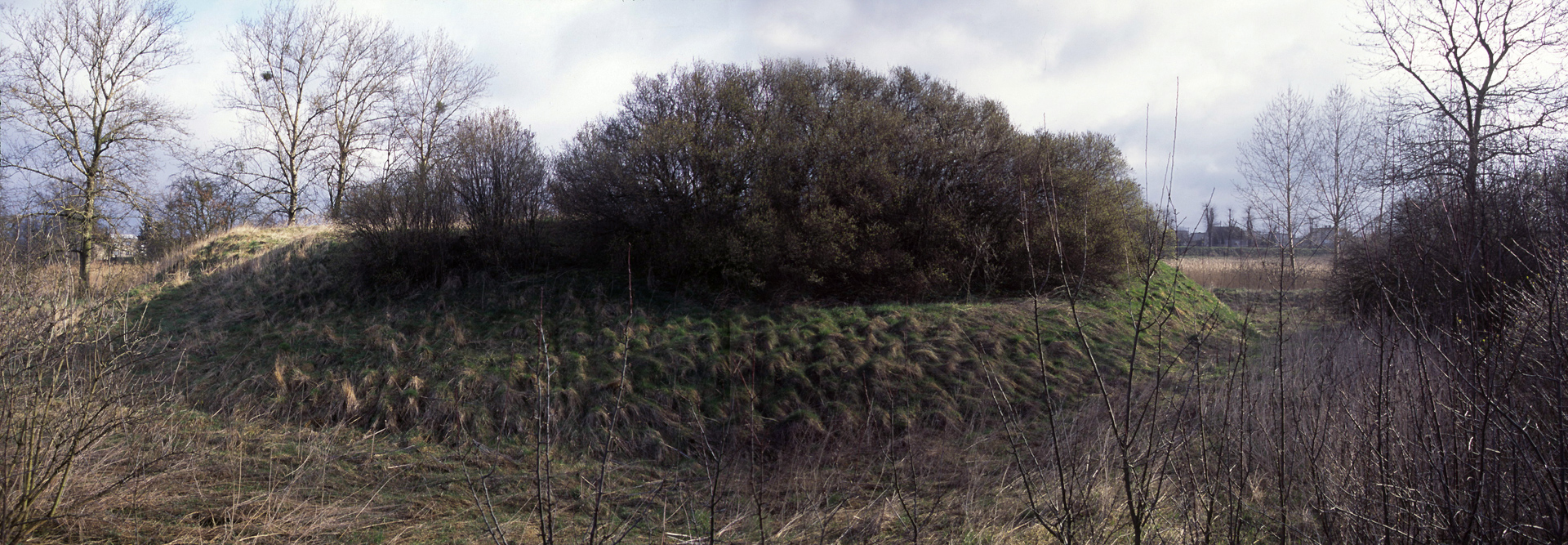
General view

Ostroróg Castle is a castle on a peninsula (formerly an island) in Ostroróg in Greater Poland Voivodeship. Ostroróg Castle was probably built around the middle of the 14th century by the ancestors of Jan Ostroróg.
