= Duchess Auguste =

Duchess Auguste may refer to:

- Duchess Auguste of Württemberg (1734–1787), married to Karl Anselm, 4th Prince of Thurn and Taxis
- Auguste of Schleswig-Holstein-Sonderburg-Glücksburg (1633–1701)
