= Karl Anselm, 4th Prince of Thurn and Taxis =

Karl Anselm
- Prince of Thurn and Taxis
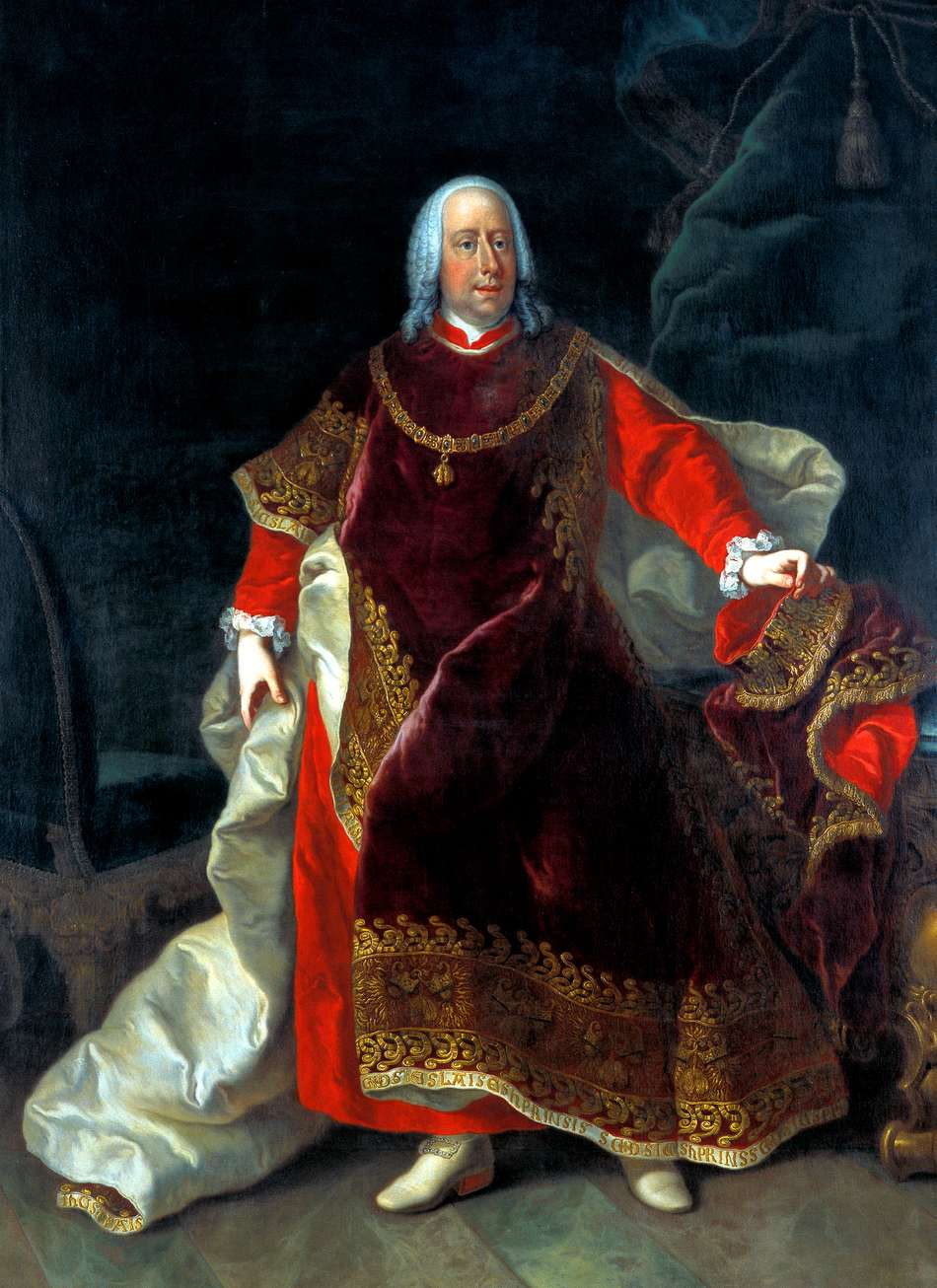
- Portrait by Johann Wilhelm Hoffnas, c. 1775

Prince of Thurn and Taxis
- Period: 17 March 1773 – 13 November 1805
- Predecessor: Alexander Ferdinand
- Successor: Karl Alexander
- Born: 2 June 1733; Frankfurt am Main, Free Imperial City of Frankfurt, Kingdom of Germany, Holy Roman Empire
- Died: 13 November 1805 (aged 72); Winzer bei Regensburg, Electorate of Bavaria, Kingdom of Germany, Holy Roman Empire
- Spouse: Duchess Auguste of Württemberg (m. 1753; died 1787)
- Issue: Princess Maria Theresia; Princess Sophie Friederike; Prince Franz Johann Nepomuck; Princess Henrica Karoline; Prince Alexander Karl; Princess Friederike Dorothea; Karl Alexander, 5th Prince of Thurn and Taxis; Prince Friedrich Johann Nepomuck; Nikolaus, Herr von Train
Names
- German: Karl Anselm
- House: House of Thurn and Taxis
- Father: Alexander Ferdinand, 3rd Prince of Thurn and Taxis
- Mother: Margravine Sophie Christine of Brandenburg-Bayreuth

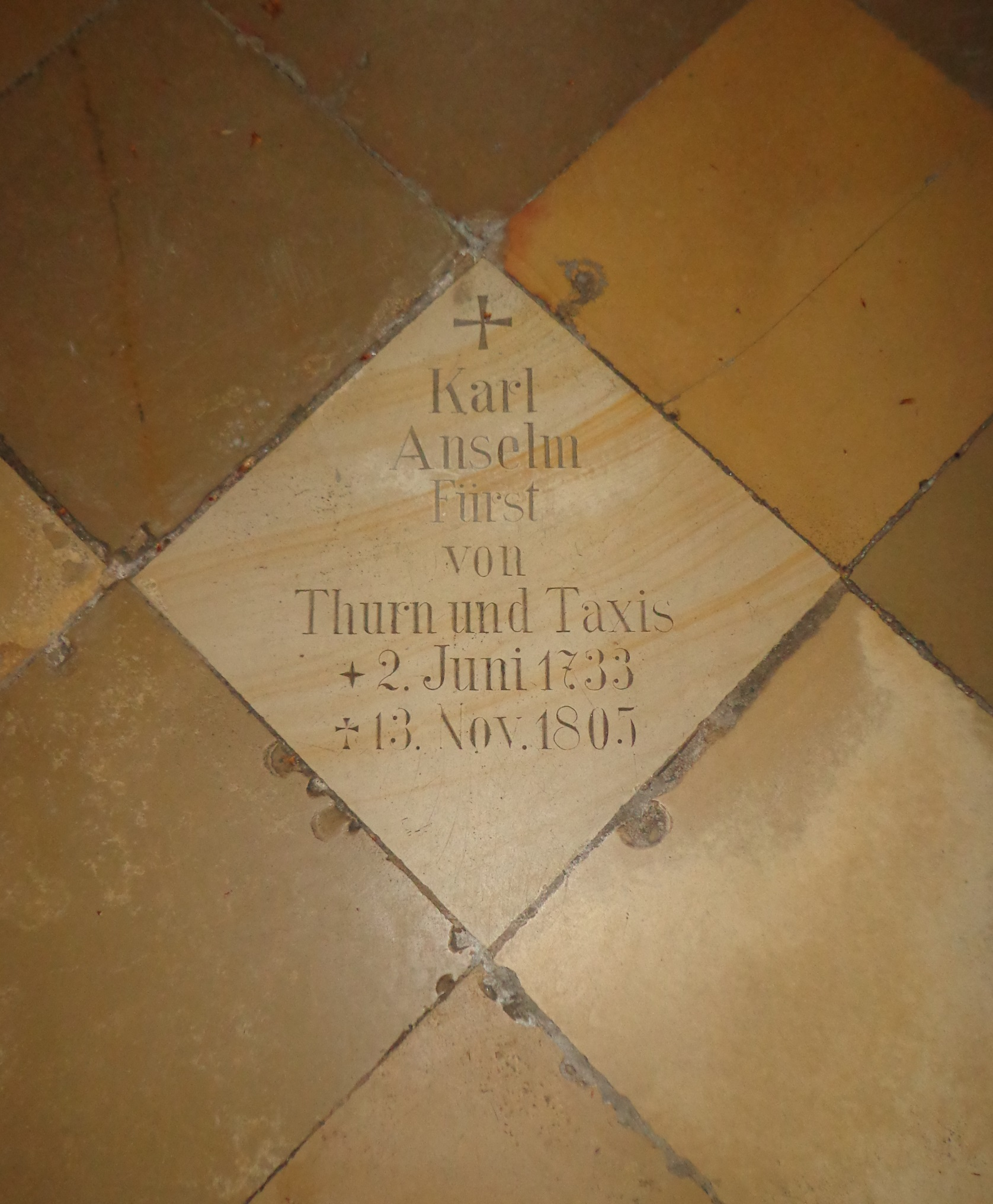
St. Emmeram's Basilica (Regensburg), grave of Karl Anselm, Prince of Thurn and Taxis

Karl Anselm, 4th Prince of Thurn and Taxis, (full German name: Karl Anselm Fürst von Thurn und Taxis, 2 June 1733 – 13 November 1805) was the fourth Prince of Thurn and Taxis, Postmaster General of the Imperial Reichspost, and Head of the Princely House of Thurn and Taxis from 17 March 1773 until his death on 13 November 1805. Karl Anselm served as Prinzipalkommissar at the Perpetual Imperial Diet in Regensburg for Joseph II, Holy Roman Emperor and Francis II, Holy Roman Emperor from 1773 to 1797.

== Early life ==
Karl Anselm was the eldest son of Alexander Ferdinand, 3rd Prince of Thurn and Taxis and Margravine Sophie Christine of Brandenburg-Bayreuth.

== Marriages and family ==
Karl Anselm married Duchess Auguste of Württemberg, sixth and youngest child of Karl Alexander, Duke of Württemberg and his wife Princess Maria Augusta of Thurn and Taxis, on 3 September 1753 in Stuttgart, Duchy of Württemberg. Karl Anselm and Auguste had eight children:

- Princess Maria Theresia of Thurn and Taxis (born 10 July 1757 † 9 March 1776)

∞ 25 August 1774 Kraft Ernst, Prince of Oettingen-Oettingen

- Princess Sophie Friederike of Thurn and Taxis (born 20 July 1758; † 31 May 1800)

∞ 31 December 1775 Prince Hieronim Wincenty Radziwiłł (11 May 1759-18 September 1786)
∞ around 1795 NN Kazanowski
∞ 1797 to a Count Ostrorog

- Prince Franz Johann Nepomuck of Thurn and Taxis (baptized 2 October 1759; † 22 January 1760)
- Princess Henrica Karoline of Thurn and Taxis (baptized 25 April 1762; † 25 April 1784)

∞ 21 April 1783 with Johannes Aloysius II, Prince of Oettingen-Oettingen and Oettingen-Spielberg

- Prince Alexander Karl of Thurn and Taxis (born 19 April 1763; † 21 April 1763)
- Princess Friederike Dorothea of Thurn and Taxis (born 11 September 1764 † 10 November 1764)
- Karl Alexander, 5th Prince of Thurn and Taxis (born 22 February 1770; † 15 July 1827)

∞ 25 May 1789 with Duchess Therese of Mecklenburg-Strelitz

- Prince Friedrich Johann Nepomuck of Thurn and Taxis (born 11 April 1772 † 7 December 1805), unmarried

Auguste and Karl Anselm had eight children until 1772. After several assassination attempts by his wife, Karl Anselm banished Auguste in January 1776 to strict house arrest at first to Burg Trugenhofen (later renamed Schloss Taxis) in Dischingen and then to Schloss Hornberg in the Black Forest, where she died on 4 June 1787. The couple legally divorced in 1776. Following the death of his first wife, Karl Anselm married that same year morganatically to Elisabeth Hildebrand.

== Acquisition of new territories ==
Karl Anselm acquired in 1786, the Swabian county of Friedberg-Scheer and had to spend almost the entire proceeds from the Imperial Reichspost. Thereupon the Emperor Joseph II brought the county to "Gefürsteten Grafschaft" status. During the invasion of French troops in the Austrian Netherlands in 1794, the local properties of the Thurn und Taxis family were seized. With the further advance of the French troops, all the possessions of the Thurn and Taxis were lost. To compensate, Karl Anselm was awarded in 1803, according to Article 13 of the Reichsdeputationshauptschluss (formally the Hauptschluss der außerordentlichen Reichsdeputation, or "Principal Conclusion of the Extraordinary Imperial Delegation") other Swabian lands, including the Free Imperial City of Buchau, the Imperial Abbey of Buchau, the Imperial Abbeys of Marchtal and Neresheim, Ostrach, and other villages.

== Losses within the Reichspost ==
By 1790, the hereditary fiefs of the Thurn and Taxis family fueled the Imperial Reichspost to its greatest extent. The Austrian Netherlands and Tyrol were added to the Thurn and Taxis postal system. Due to the Napoleonic Wars, Karl Anselm's Imperial Reichspost gradually lost more and more postal districts beginning with the Austrian Netherlands, thus depriving the post of important sources of revenue. With the Treaty of Lunéville formalized on 9 February 1801, the Imperial Reichspost lost all postal districts in the Rhine region. After Prussia had been compensated for the loss of its left-bank territories by right bank areas in May 1802, Prussia took over the sovereignty over the postal services, and so the Imperial Reichspost lost further postal districts. Only under his son and successor, Karl Alexander, was the Thurn and Taxis family able to re-establish its postal system as the private company Thurn-und-Taxis-Post.

== Ancestry ==
Ancestors of Karl Anselm, 4th Prince of Thurn and Taxis

8. Eugen Alexander Franz, 1st Prince of Thurn and Taxis
4. Anselm Franz, 2nd Prince of Thurn and Taxis
9. Princess Anna Adelheid of Fürstenberg
2. Alexander Ferdinand, 3rd Prince of Thurn and Taxis
10. Ferdinand August Leopold, Prince of Lobkowicz, Duke of Sagan
5. Maria Ludovika Anna Franziska, Princess of Lobkowicz
11. Margravine Maria Anna Wilhelmine of Baden-Baden
1. Karl Anselm, 4th Prince of Thurn and Taxis
12. Christian Heinrich of Brandenburg-Bayreuth-Kulmbach
6. George Frederick Charles, Margrave of Brandenburg-Bayreuth
13. Countess Sophie Christiane of Wolfstein
3. Margravine Sophie Christine of Brandenburg-Bayreuth
14. Frederick Louis, Duke of Schleswig-Holstein-Sonderburg-Beck
7. Princess Dorothea of Schleswig-Holstein-Sonderburg-Beck
15. Luise Charlotte of Schleswig-Holstein-Sonderburg-Augustenburg

== Sources ==
- Wolfgang Behringer, Thurn und Taxis, München 1990 ISBN 3-492-03336-9
- Wolfgang Behringer, Im Zeichen des Merkur, Göttingen 2003 ISBN 3-525-35187-9
- Wolfgang Behringer, in: Damals, Juli 2005
- Martin Dallmeier, Quellen zur Geschichte des europäischen Postwesens, Kallmünz 1977
- Martin Dallmeier und Martha Schad, Das fürstliche Haus Thurn und Taxis, 300 Jahre Geschichte in Bildern, Verlag Pustet, Regensburg 1996 ISBN 3-7917-1492-9
- Siegfried Grillmeyer, Habsburgs Diener in Post und Politik. Das Haus Thurn und Taxis zwischen 1745 und 1867, Mainz 2005
- Adolf Layer, Schloß Trugenhofen(= Schloß Taxis) im 18. Jahrhundert, in: Jahrbuch des Historischen Vereins in Dillingen an der Donau, Jahrgang 1983, Dillingen an der Donau 1983, S. 179–194
- Christoph Meixner, Die Familien Oettingen-Wallerstein und Thurn und Taxis und die Fürstenhochzeit auf Schloß Trugenhofen 1774. Ein Beitrag zur Geschichte der Hofmusik im 18. Jahrhundert, in: Rosetti-Forum 7, 2006, S. 12–25.
- Christoph Meixner, Artikel Thurn und Taxis, in: MGG2 (Die Musik in Geschichte und Gegenwart, 2. Auflage), Supplementband, Kassel u.a. 2008, Sp. 942–945
- Max Piendl, Das fürstliche Haus Thurn und Taxis, Regensburg 1980
- Europäische Stammtafeln Band V, Genealogie Thurn und Taxis, Tafel 131

Karl Anselm, 4th Prince of Thurn and Taxis House of Thurn and Taxis Cadet branch of the House of Tassis Born: 2 June 1733 Died: 13 November 1805
German nobility
Preceded by Alexander Ferdinand	Prince of Thurn and Taxis; 17 March 1773 – 13 November 1805	Succeeded by Karl Alexander
Postal offices
Preceded by Alexander Ferdinand	Postmaster General of the Holy Roman Empire; 17 March 1773–1805	Succeeded by Karl Alexander as Postmaster General of the Thurn-und-Taxis-Post
