= Mikołaj Ostroróg =

17th-century Polish–Lithuanian politician and military officer

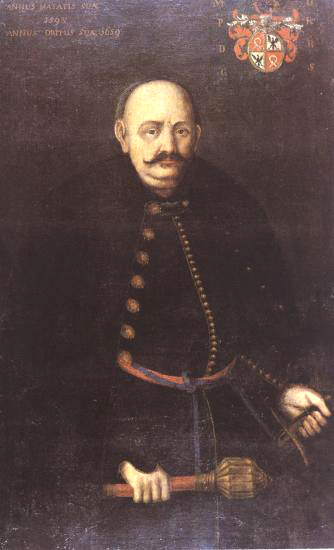
- Coat of arms: Nałęcz
- Born: 1593
- Died: 1651 (aged 57–58)
- Noble family: Ostroróg
- Father: Jan Ostroróg
- Mother: Katarzyna Mielecka

Mikołaj Ostroróg (1593–1651) was a Polish–Lithuanian szlachcic (nobleman), politician and general.

He was Podstoli of the Crown since 1633, Stolnik of the Crown since 1624, Krajczy of the Crown since 1636, Podczaszy of the Crown since 1638, Starost of Tykocin since 1645 and buski since 1646.

He served as the Sejm Marshal in the 1633. Deputy to a number of Sejms, he supported the policies of the administration, and was well known for his erudition in Polish and Latin.

In his military career, he reached the rank of regimentarz. He took part in the losing battle of Pyliavtsi in 1648 during the Khmelnytsky Uprising. Later, in 1649, he fought at the siege of Zbaraż.

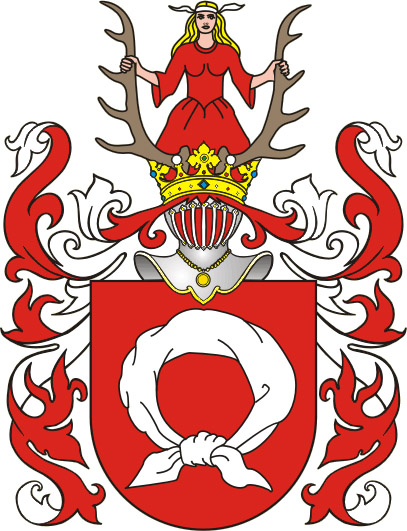
Nałęcz Coat of Arms

Marshal of the Sejm (koronacyjny) on 8 February – 17 March 1633 in Kraków.
