= Hieronim Wincenty Radziwiłł =

Polish noble, politician, and diplomat (1759–1786)

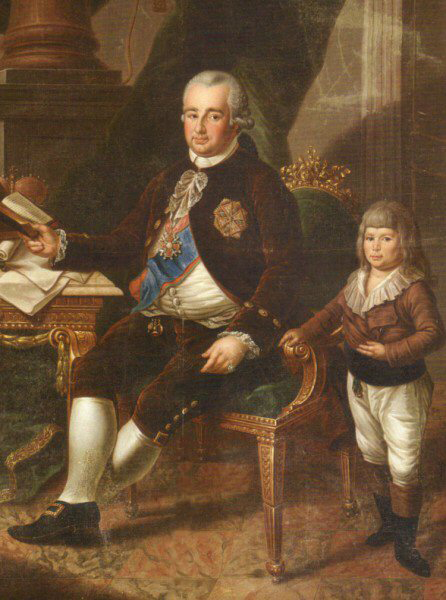
- Born: 11 May 1759; Nieśwież
- Died: 18 September 1786 (aged 27)
- Spouse: Princess Sophie Friederike of Thurn and Taxis
- Children: Dominik Hieronim Radziwiłł
- Parent(s): Michał Kazimierz "Rybeńko" Radziwiłł; Anna Luiza Mycielska

Prince Hieronim Wincenty Radziwiłł (Lithuanian: Jeronimas Vincentas Radvila) (11 May 1759 – 18 September 1786) was a Polish nobleman, prince, diplomat, politician and Knight of the Order of the White Eagle, awarded in 1780.

He was Count of Kleck, Great Cupbearer of Lithuania from 1779 and governor of Minsk.

He married Princess Sophie Friederike of Thurn and Taxis, daughter of Karl Anselm, 4th Prince of Thurn and Taxis and his wife Duchess Auguste of Württemberg, on 31 December 1775 in Regensburg.

He was decorated with the Order of Saint Hubert.
