= Princess Sophie Christine of Brandenburg-Bayreuth =

Margravine Sophie Christine
- Hereditary Princess of Thurn and Taxis
- Born: 4 January 1710; Schloss Weferlingen, Weferlingen
- Died: 13 June 1739 (aged 29); Brussels, Austrian Netherlands
- Spouse: Alexander Ferdinand, 3rd Prince of Thurn and Taxis (m. 1731)
- Issue: Princess Sophie Christine; Karl Anselm, 4th Prince of Thurn and Taxis; Princess Luise Auguste Charlotte; Prince Friedrich August; Prince Ludwig Franz
Names
- German: Sophie Christine Luise
- House: Hohenzollern
- Father: George Frederick Charles, Margrave of Brandenburg-Bayreuth
- Mother: Princess Dorothea of Schleswig-Holstein-Sonderburg-Beck

Margravine Sophie Christine Louise of Brandenburg-Bayreuth (in German: Sophie Christine Luise, Markgräfin von Brandenburg-Bayreuth; 4 January 1710 – 13 June 1739) was a member of the Brandenburg-Bayreuth line of the House of Hohenzollern and a Margravine of Brandenburg-Bayreuth by birth. Through her marriage to Alexander Ferdinand, 3rd Prince of Thurn and Taxis, Sophie Christine was also a member of the Princely House of Thurn and Taxis and Hereditary Princess of Thurn and Taxis.

== Family and early life ==
Sophie Christine was the eldest child and daughter of George Frederick Charles, Margrave of Brandenburg-Bayreuth and his first wife Princess Dorothea of Schleswig-Holstein-Sonderburg-Beck. She died on 13 June 1739.

== Marriage and issue ==
Sophie Christine married Alexander Ferdinand, Hereditary Prince of Thurn and Taxis, the eldest child and only son of Anselm Franz, 2nd Prince of Thurn and Taxis and his wife Maria Ludovika Anna Franziska, Princess of Lobkowicz, on 11 April 1731 in Frankfurt am Main. Sophie Christine and Alexander Ferdinand had five children:

- Princess Sophie Christine of Thurn and Taxis (baptized 8 December 1731 † 23 December 1731)
- Karl Anselm, 4th Prince of Thurn and Taxis (born 2 June 1733 † 13 November 1805)

∞ 3 September 1753 Duchess Auguste of Württemberg (30 October 1734-4 June 1787)
∞ 1787 Elisabeth Hildebrand, Frau von Train

- Princess Luise Auguste Charlotte of Thurn and Taxis (born 27 October 1734 † January 1735)
- Prince Friedrich August of Thurn and Taxis (baptized 5 December 1736 † 12 September 1755)
- Prince Ludwig Franz Karl Lamoral Joseph of Thurn and Taxis (born 13 October 1737 † 7 August 1738)

== Ancestry ==
Ancestors of Princess Sophie Christine of Brandenburg-Bayreuth

8. Georg Albrecht, Margrave of Brandenburg-Bayreuth-Kulmbach
4. Christian Heinrich, Margrave of Brandenburg-Bayreuth-Kulmbach
9. Marie Elisabeth of Schleswig-Holstein-Sonderburg-Glücksburg
2. George Frederick Charles, Margrave of Brandenburg-Bayreuth
10. Albrecht Friedrich, Count of Wolfstein
5. Sophie Christiane of Wolfstein
11. Countess Sophie Luise of Castell-Remlingen
1. Margravine Sophie Christine of Brandenburg-Bayreuth
12. August Philipp, Duke of Schleswig-Holstein-Sonderburg-Beck
6. Frederick Louis, Duke of Schleswig-Holstein-Sonderburg-Beck
13. Marie Sibylle of Nassau-Saarbrücken
3. Princess Dorothea of Schleswig-Holstein-Sonderburg-Beck
14. Ernest Günther, Duke of Schleswig-Holstein-Sonderburg-Augustenburg
7. Louise Charlotte of Schleswig-Holstein-Sonderburg-Augustenburg
15. Augusta of Schleswig-Holstein-Sonderburg-Glücksburg
