= Ostroróg family =

Polish noble family

Coat of the family was Nałęcz.

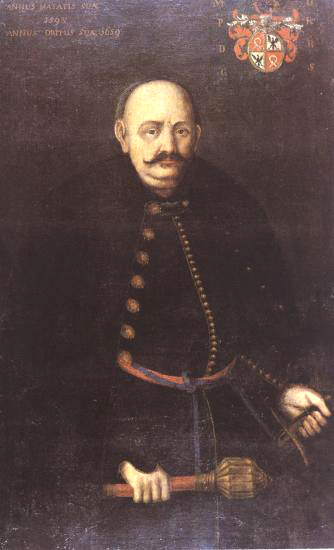
Mikołaj Ostroróg (1593–1651)

The House of Ostroróg was the name of an old Polish noble family taking their name from Ostroróg, a town in Szamotuły County, Greater Poland Voivodeship, Poland. They used the Nałęcz coat of arms. Members of the family held important civic posts in the Wielkpolska region in the Kingdom of Poland, particularly that of voivode. At the end of the 19th-century, family members settled in France, England and for a time, in Turkey.

== Coat of arms ==
Coat of Arms of Counts Ostroróg

Coat of Arms of Counts Ostroróg (II variant)

== Notable members ==
- Sędziwój Ostroróg (1375–1441), voivode of Poznań Voivodeship
- Dobrogost Ostroróg (1400-1478/79), castellan of Gniezno
- Stanisław Ostroróg (1400–1477), voivode of Kalisz Voivodeship
- Jan Ostroróg (1436–1501), voivode of Poznań Voivodeship, political thinker
- Wacław Ostroróg (?-1527), castellan of Kalisz
- Jakub Ostroróg (1516-1568), magnate and politician from Poznań
- Jan Ostroróg (1561–1622), voivode of Poznań Voivodeship
- Mikołaj Ostroróg (1593–1651), marshal of the Sejm
- Stanisław Julian Ostroróg (1834–1890), Crimean War veteran, photographer under pseudonym, Walery
- Stanisław Julian Ignacy Ostroróg (1863-1929), Art photographer, under pseudonym Walery and combinations thereof
- Leon Walerian Ostroróg (1867-1932), jurist, writer translator. Specialist in Turkish law
- Stanislas Ostroróg (1897-1960), French ambassador to India, grandson of Crimean veteran, Stanisŀaw
