= Stävlö Castle =

Coordinates: 56°45′09″N 16°21′43″E

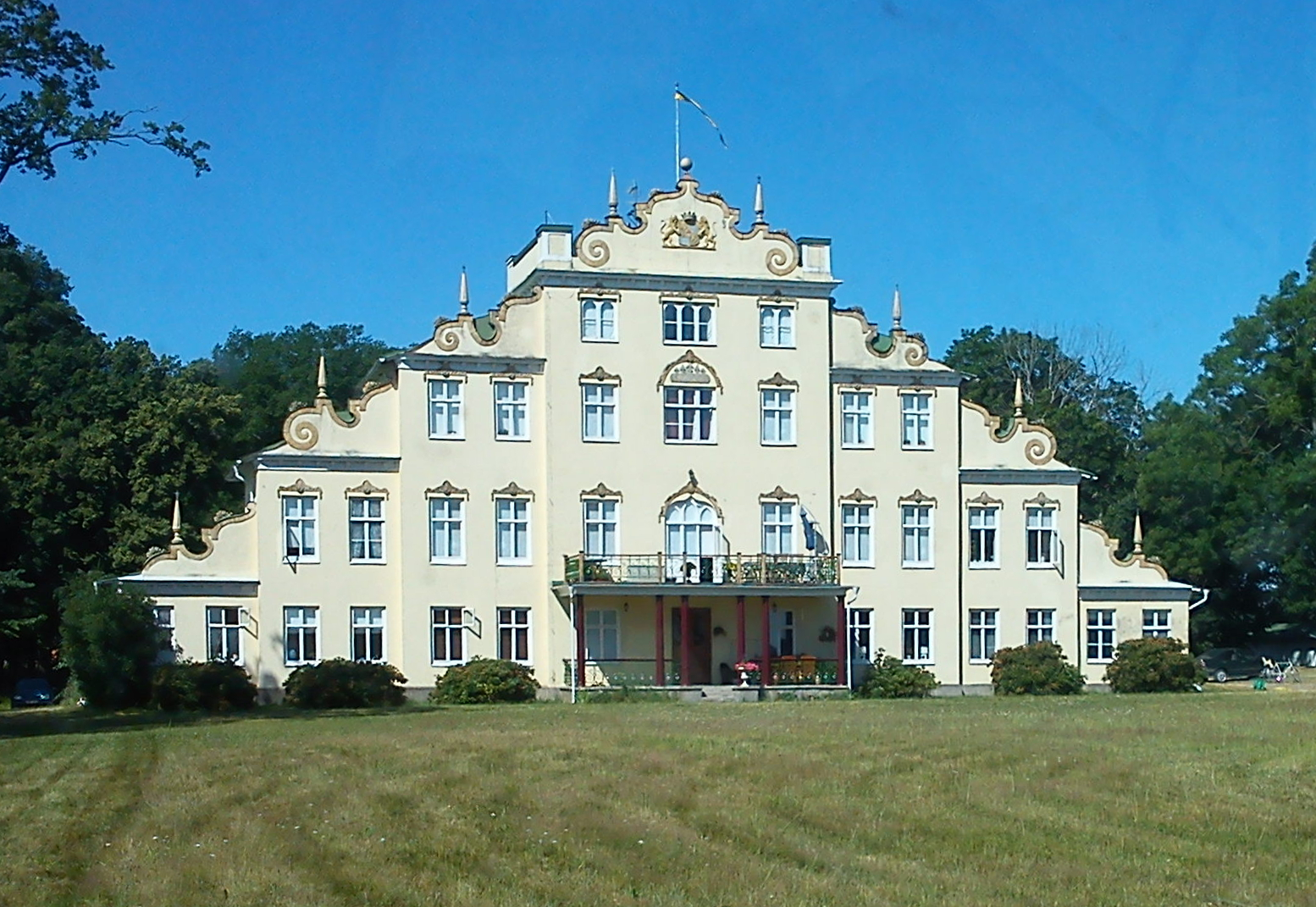
Stävlö

Stävlö or Stäflö is a castle in Kalmar Municipality of Sweden.

== History ==
Stävlö is one of the most eccentric Swedish buildings of the 19th century, and was designed by the owner Carl Otto Posse himself, who based the shape of the building on the Posse family coat of arms.

After he became owner of the estate in 1834, Posse had the original manor house knocked down for his new construction, which was completed in 1860. The central part of the castle is four storeys high, and each surrounding part is a level lower, ending with a single storey pavilion on each side, and the whole was originally surrounded by parkland in the romantic style. The stepped sections, together with the pediment on the central block, are decorated with volutes, and the pediment is also decorated with the Posse coat of arms. The building's most impressive room is a music room extending vertically through two storeys and crowned by a glass cupola.

The property is now owned by the Johansson family and closed to the public.
