= Mycielski =

Mycielski (feminine form MYCIELSKA, plural MYCIELSCY/MYCIELSKIE) - a noble Polish family of the Dołęga clan. "The first record of a Mycielski is from 1437 when brothers Florian and Mikołaj were in a dispute with vicar Jan of Kościelec."

The hereditary title of Count was bestowed on Józef Mycielski (1794-1867) in Prussia, by King Frederick Wilhelm III on 20 June 1822 LP 30 July 1822, recognised in Austria on 16 April 1896

Some notable Mycielskis:

- Florian Tworzyjan Mycielski (died 1470), "a courtier with a seat in the Senate, Counsellor to King Kazimiersz Jagiełło, Castellan of Biechów".
- Mikołaj Mycielski (died after 1686): "High Court Judge, Member of the Sejm, Wojski of Kalisz, Starosta for Konin, Secretary to King Jan Kazimierz".
- Maciej Mycielski (1690–1747) "Cup bearer of Kalisz, Castellan of Poznań, Order of the White Eagle. Great peacekeeper during very turbulent times. With his wife Weronika Mycielska née Konarzewska, completed the Basilica and monastery of Św Góra (Holy Hill) in Gostyń".
- Józef Mycielski (1690–1734) "The envoy from Poznań to the Convocation Sejm", "he signed the election of King Stanislaw Leszczyński in 1733".
- Józef Mycielski (1733–1789), "Starosta of Konin, Palatine of Inowrocław, Member of the Sejm, Knight of the Order of St Stanislas" and of "the Order of the White Eagle, Adjutant in the Lithuanian army, Major General and Colonel of the Infantry (Gt Lithuanian Army 1759, Lieutenant General 1762".
- Stanisław Mycielski (1768–1813) with his wife Anna (1767–1840), one of Napoleon Bonaparte's most passionate supporters. "Adjutant to Napoleon's General Masséna. 'It was thus that Napoleon and his entourage came to be at Kobylopole, on the occasion of Stanisław and Anna's daughter's christening. She was held at the font by General Masséna and christened Constance Victoire (Konstancja Wiktoria in Polish) in Napoleon's honour; also possibly as a gesture towards General Masséna himself whose nickname was "L'enfant chéri de la victoire" - "the dear child of victory". He fought with Napoleon in the 1806-1807 campaign. He and his wife Anna were fierce anti-Prussian activists and their home Kobylopole was a hotbed of it. "There are Prussian references to the dangers of "fanatical women" mentioning, in particular that "as long as women like Chłapowska from Dąbrówka and Anna Mycielska from Kobylopole are allowed to live in Southern Prussia, there will be no peace there. These women bring up their children on hatred against Prussians"
- Franciszek Mycielski (1794–1831), son of Stanisław (1768–1813) and Anna (1767–1840), "Aide de Camp to General Dąbrowski". "Fought in the Napoleonic war, in the 1813-1814 campaign. Légion d’Honneur and Virtuti Militari."

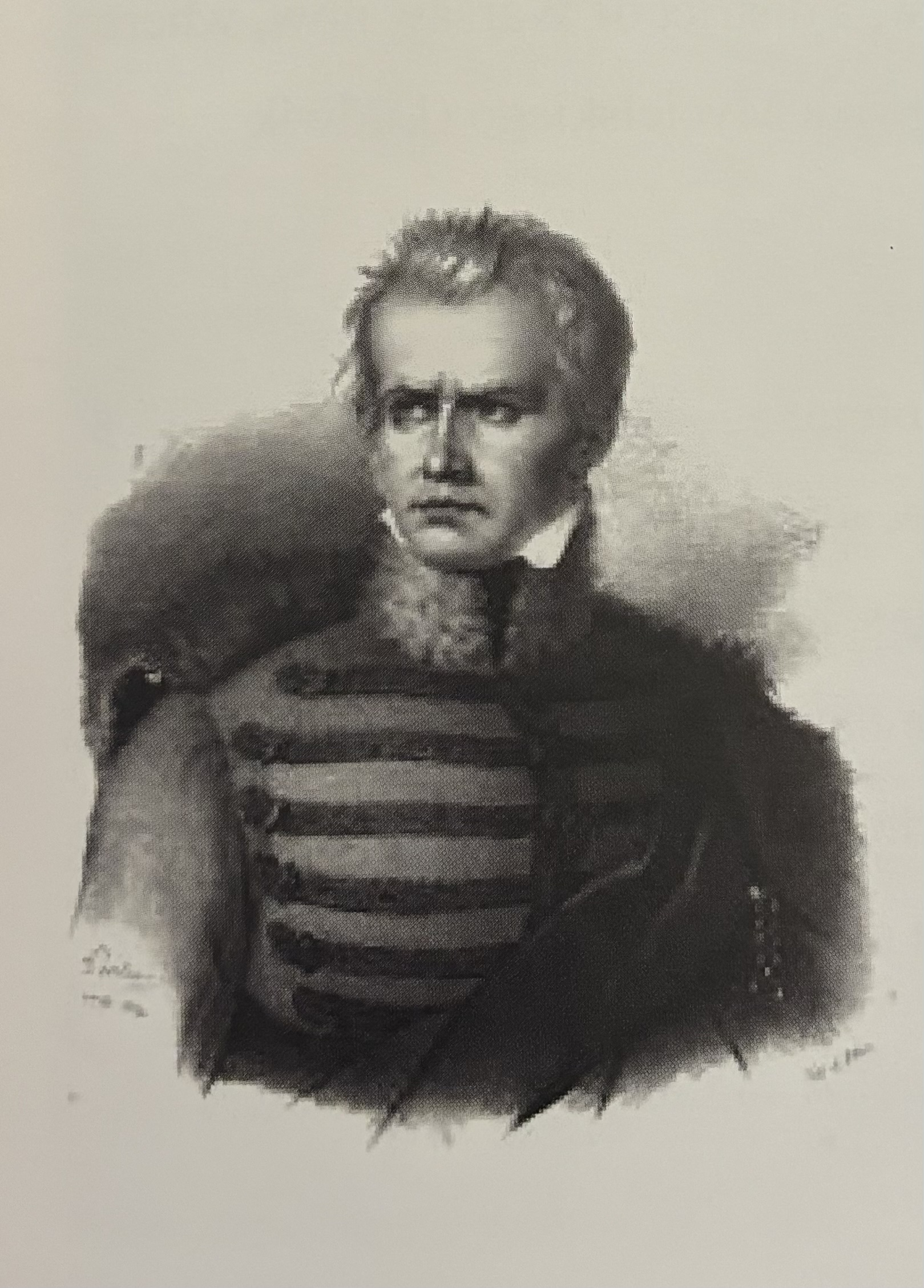
Ludwik Mycielski

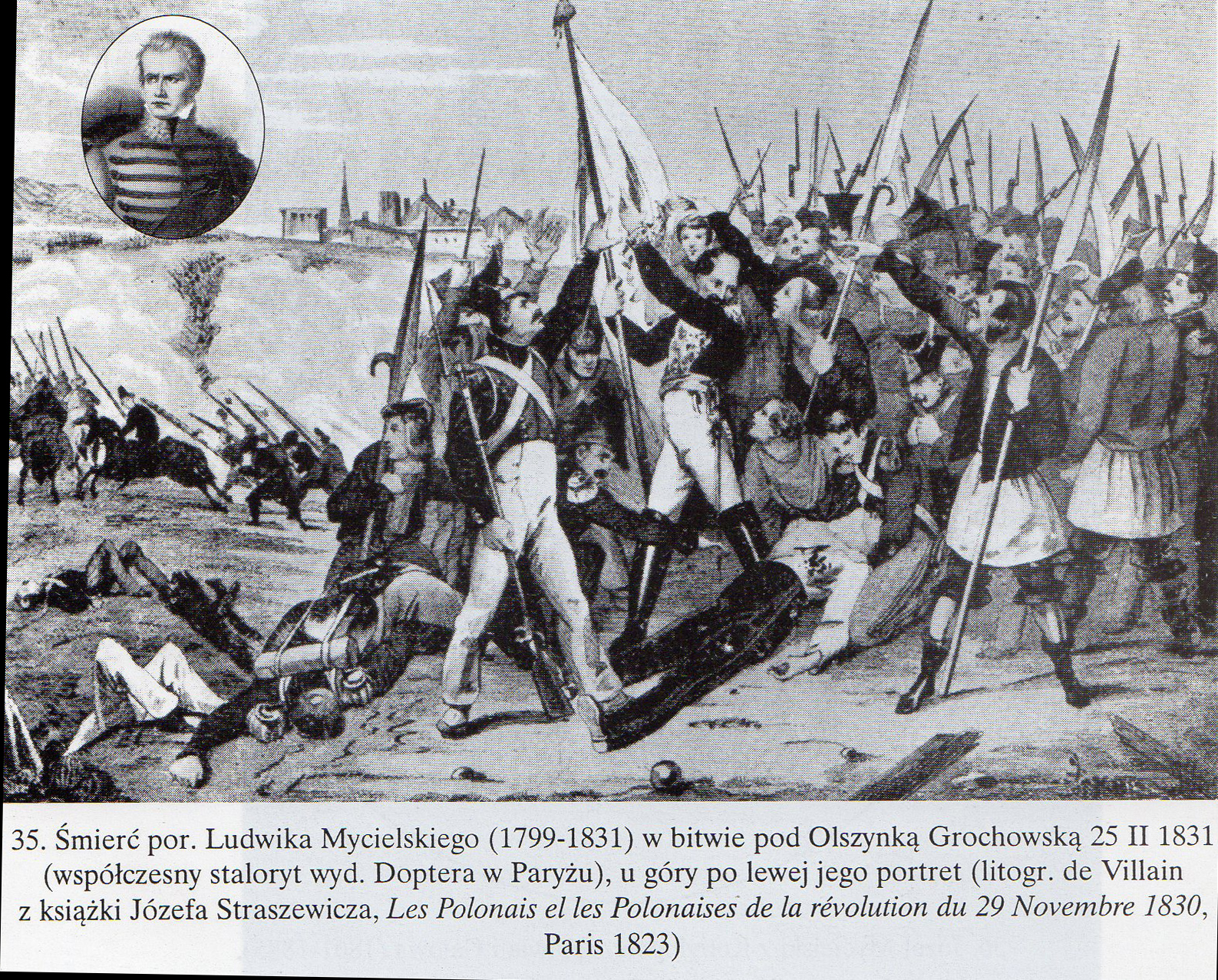
The Death of Ludwik Mycielski at the battle of Grochów

- Ludwik Mycielski (1796-1831), son of Stanisław (1768-1813) and Anna (1767-1840). "1st Lieutenant in the Light Cavalry at the age of 16 under General Konopka". "After Napoleon's fall, he was Second Lieutenant in the 4th Infantry Regiment under Colonel Ignacy Mycielski and, still a teenager, soon became Aide de Camp to General Toliński" At the age of 34 the time of the November Uprising of 1830 he was one of the first to volunteer. His old colonel told him they had enough officers and needed more soldiers in the ranks. Thus, having been an officer and an Aide de Camp, this veteran from the Great Army came to fight in the Uprising of 1830 as a simple soldier. There are many accounts of Ludwik's heroic death at the age of 35 at Grochów, now a district in Warsaw, where there is a street bearing his name.
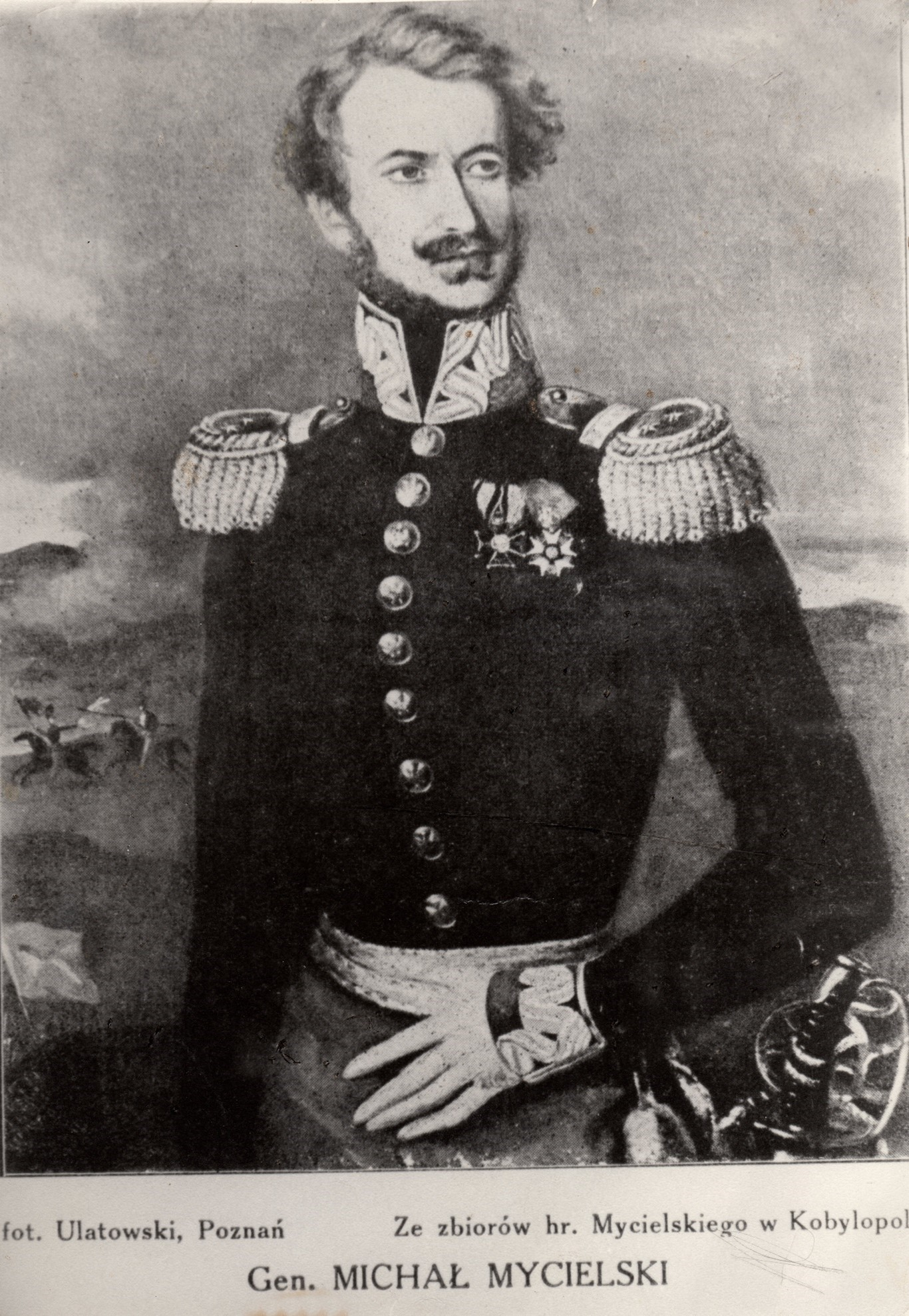
  General Michał Mycielski (1796-1849)
- Michał Mycielski (1796-1849) twin of Ludwik, son of Stanisław (1768-1813) and Anna (1767-1840). Joined the army at the age of 16 and within a month (June 1812) was second lieutenant in the regiment of the French General Grouchy. By September he was General Kosiński's second adjutant by whose side he had a baptism of fire at the Battle of Bug. For the Campaign of 1812 "he was awarded the Virtuti Militari", the highest Polish decoration for outstanding combat merit. On a par with the Victoria Cross, the Virtuti Military is the oldest military order in the world. Michał fought at Denewitz and Leipzig, and was shot in the left leg on the last day of this "Battle of Nations" (19 October 1813) "Continued following Napoleon and fought at Hanau. There was little left by then of the Polish and Lithuanian armies and the reorganization of the army of the Duchy of Warsaw took place in Sedan in January 1814. Michał Mycielski, still only 18, joined the 2 regiment of the Ulans under General Siemiątkowski and took part in the entire bloody campaign of 1814 fighting in all the most important battles. He was at Berry au Bac, Laon, Longers, Soissons, Reims, Arcis-sur-Aube, Chateaux Thierry, Saint Dizier. When Paris nevertheless capitulated Michał found himself in the post-Napoleon army as a cavalry marksman and lieutenant and then in the household cavalry as a captain in December 1818. He was 22. "In September 1824 Michał Mycielski became adjutant to the Commander of the Polish Army Grand Duke Constantin Romanov who had been installed as the Viceroy of Poland". He resigned from the position on 16 September 1829 due to ill health. He was at the terrible battle of Grochów (1831) where his twin brother Ludwik died his heroic death. After that battle, Michał led the 2 regiment of Uhlans and later as Lieutenant Colonel to General Ludwik Kicki, he distinguished himself in further charges against the Russians. At the battle of Iganie he and his men saw off 3 regiments of Russian hussars and on the 12 th April 1831 General Skrzyniecki promoted him to Colonel. "When General Kicki was killed Michał stepped into his shoes and in August 1831 became Brigadier General" . Due to TB he was unable to join in the last battle in defence of Warsaw. He died in "Trois Moulins" near Melun on 23 September 1849. In "Biographies of Distinguished Poles from XVIII and XIX centuries" by Janusz Staszewski (published in 1930 by Poznań University) there is a very detailed account of the military achievements of the Mycielskis during the Uprising. And the part played by the Mycielski brothers was immortalized in a large painting by the renowned Polish painter Kossak (painted 1887-1888). It represents the battle of Grochów.It depicts three Mycielski brothers, and the death of Ludwik from a Russian bullet. Thousands of prints were produced but the painting was destroyed in 1914. In the 1920s Kossak painted a smaller replica of it.
- Jerzy Mycielski (1856-1928) Art Historian with a Doctorate in History from the Jagiellonian University of Krakow. Published countless works on both History and Art. Professor of History of Art at the Jagiellonian University, his most important book was: "Sto Lat Dziejów Malarstwa w Polsce 1760-1860" (A Hundred Years of Painting in Poland 1760-1780) which was published in 1898 and was the very first large-scale study of Polish painting.
- Władysław Mycielski (1894-1941) At the start of World War I he fought on the French front and in 1918, as Second Lieutenant, took part in the Greater Poland Uprising against the Prussians, a vital insurrection in which Poland was victorious. Its territorial gains were confirmed by the Treaty of Versailles which brought World War I to an end. During the Bolshevik War, he fought against the Russians as adjutant to General Kazimierz Raszewski. The war ended with a ceasefire in October 1920, the Peace of Riga was signed in 1921. Władysław was awarded the Polish Krzyż Walecznych for deeds of valour and courage in battle. He was 27. In World War II he and his family were deported by the Russians to a Siberian labour camp (Siewurałtag 10, odt 47 Lagomandirowka.) where he died on 6 October 1941 with one of his brothers. He was 46.
- Jan Mycielski (1932–2025), Polish-American mathematician
  - The Mycielskian, a construction in graph theory
  - The Grötzsch graph, sometimes called the Mycielski graph or the Mycielski-Grötzsch graph
- Ludwik Mycielski (1854-1926), Polish politician
- Helena Mycielska (née Broel Plater - 1906-2008), wife of Ludwik (1894-1985) "She was awarded (by Pope John Paul II) the order of St Sylvester (one of the five papal orders of knighthood)".
- Zygmunt Mycielski (1907-1987), Polish composer and music critic

== List of Mycielskis in the Polish Biographical Dictionary (PSB) ==
- " 1. Mycielska Karolina (1800-1849) (Zdzisław Grot, t. XXII, 1977, s. 325)
- 2. Mycielski Aleksander (ok. 1670-1729) (Wacław Szczygielski, t. XXII, 1977, s. 326)
- 3. Mycielski Aleksander (1723-1818) (Helena Wereszycka, t. XXII, 1977, s. 327)
- 4. Mycielski Andrzej (zm. 1707) (Włodzimierz Dworzaczek, t. XXII, 1977, s. 327-328)
- 5. Mycielski Edward (1865-1939) (Jerzy Zdrada, t. XXII, 1977, s. 328)
- 6. Mycielski Erazm (1769-1800) (Helena Wereszycka, t. XXII, 1977, s. 328-330)
- 7. Mycielski Franciszek (1832-1901) (Zdzisław Grot, t. XXII, 1977, s. 331)
- 8. Mycielski Ignacy (1784-1831) (Andrzej Wędzki, t. XXII, 1977, s. 331-332)
- 9. Mycielski Jan Kazimierz (1864-1913) (Przemysław Michałowski, t. XXII, 1977, s. 332)
- 10. Mycielski Jerzy (1856-1928) (Adam Bochnak, t. XXII, 1977, s. 332-335)
- 11. Mycielski Józef (ok. 1690-1734) (Wacław Szczygielski, t. XXII, 1977, s. 335)
- 12. Mycielski Józef (1733-1789) (Wacław Szczygielski, t. XXII, 1977, s. 336-337)
- 13. Mycielski Józef (1801-1885) (Adam Galos, t. XXII, 1977, s. 337-338)
- 14. Mycielski Józef (1855-1918) (Kazimierz Ślaski, t. XXII, 1977, s. 338-339)
- 15. Mycielski Ludwik (1796-1831) (Andrzej Wędzki, t. XXII, 1977, s. 339)
- 16. Mycielski Ludwik (1837-1863) (Andrzej Wędzki, t. XXII, 1977, s. 339-340)
- 17. Mycielski Ludwik (1854-1926) (Zdzisław Grot, t. XXII, 1977, s. 340-341)
- 18. Mycielski Maciej (1690-1747) (Wacław Szczygielski, t. XXII, 1977, s. 341-342)
- 19. Mycielski Michał (1796-1849) (Andrzej Wędzki, t. XXII, 1977, s.342-343)
- 20. Mycielski Michał (1826-1906) (Bronisław Natoński, t. XXII, 1977, s. 343-345)
- 21. Mycielski Piotr (zm. między 1599 a 1601) (Włodzimierz Dworzaczek, t. XXII, 1977, s. 345-346)
- 22. Mycielski Stanisław (1743-1818) (Elżbieta Aleksandrowska, t. XXII, 1977, s. 346-347)
- 23. Mycielski Stanisław (1767-1813) (Andrzej Wędzki, t. XXII, 1977, s. 347)
- 24. Mycielski Stanisław (1864-1933) (Jerzy Zdrada, t. XXII, 1977, s. 348)
- 25. Mycielski Teodor (1804-1874) (Zdzisław Grot, t. XXII, 1977, s. 348-349) "

=== See also ===
- Dołęga-Mycielski, Polish noble family
