= Jakub Ostroróg =

Polish politician, magnate (c. 1516–1568)

Jakub Ostroróg (c. 1516–1568) was a prominent 16th-century Polish magnate and politician from Poznań. He was one of the main leaders of the community of Bohemian Brethren, who were followers of Jan Hus, in the area. After his appointment as Starosta General of Poznań (1566), the influence of local magnates, who generally supported Protestant causes, on the affairs of Poland's royal cities increased markedly. Under his patronage the Protestant community in Poznań expanded, although it subsequently declined over the course of the 17th century, after his death.

He was a major supporter of the Executionist movement.

He owned property in Ostroróg, a village located about 47 kilometers northwest of Poznań, which was used as a residence of the seniors of the Bohemian Brethren movement.
