= Princess Dorothea of Schleswig-Holstein-Sonderburg-Beck =

Dorothea of Schleswig-Holstein-Sonderburg-Beck
- Margravine of Brandenburg-Bayreuth-Kulmbach
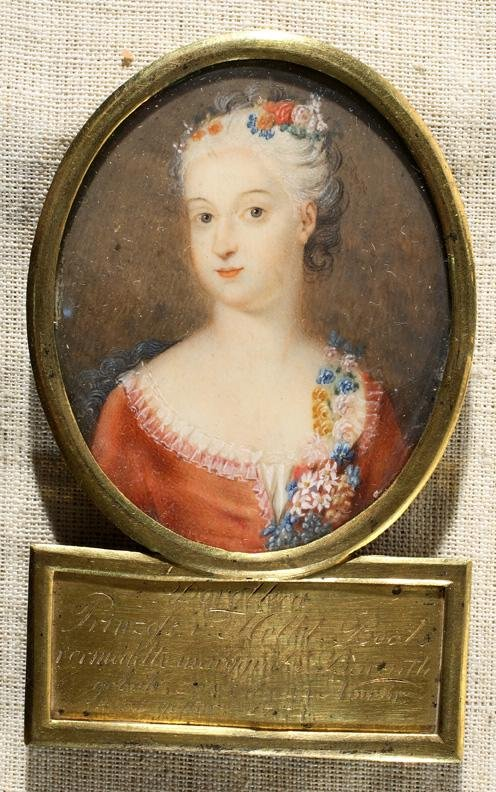
- Born: 24 November 1685; Augustenburg
- Died: 25 December 1761 (aged 76); Stäflö, Sweden
- Spouse: George Frederick Charles, Margrave of Brandenburg-Bayreuth
- Issue Detail: Sophie Christiane Luise, Hereditary Princess of Thurn and Taxis; Frederick, Margrave of Brandenburg-Bayreuth; Sophie Charlotte Albertine, Duchess of Saxe-Weimar-Eisenach
- House: House of Oldenburg
- Father: Frederick Louis, Duke of Schleswig-Holstein-Sonderburg-Beck
- Mother: Luise Charlotte of Schleswig-Holstein-Sonderburg-Augustenburg

Dorothea of Schleswig-Holstein-Sonderburg-Beck, known also as Dorothea von Holstein-Beck and Dorothea von Ziedewitz, (24 November 1685 – 25 December 1761), was a German princess of the House of Oldenburg and by marriage Margravine of Brandenburg-Bayreuth-Kulmbach.

== Family ==
She was the eldest of the thirteen children of Frederick Louis, Duke of Schleswig-Holstein-Sonderburg-Beck, and his wife, Princess Luise Charlotte of Schleswig-Holstein-Sonderburg-Augustenburg. Of all her siblings, only seven survived to adulthood: Frederick William II, who inherited Beck after succeeding his father; Charles Louis, later husband of the Countess Orzelska and ruler of Beck after the death of his nephew; Philipp Wilhelm, who died unmarried in 1729; Luise Albertine, by marriage von Seeguth-Stanislawsky; Peter August, who years later inherited Beck from his older brother; Sophie Henriette, Burgravine and Countess of Dohna-Schlobitten; and Charlotte, Abbess of Quedlinburg.

== Life ==
Dorothea married Georg Frederick Karl of Brandenburg-Bayreuth-Kulmbach, later Margrave of Bayreuth, on 17 April 1709 in Reinfeld and settled at Weferlingen. They had five children, two sons and three daughters.

The union was completely unhappy. On 3 December 1716 Dorothea was convicted of "crimes against marital fidelity" (adultery) and imprisoned, firstly in the Ansbach fortress of Wülzburg, then exiled to Altendorf near Bamberg, and finally interned at the Lauenstein fortress in Altenberg. Her children were raised by their grandmother.

Only eight years later, in 1724, the marriage was formally dissolved, but Dorothea remained imprisoned. In 1726 Georg Frederick Karl succeeded as Margrave of Bayreuth and moved from Weferlingen to Bayreuth. He was probably uncomfortable that his divorced wife should bear the title of Margravine of Brandenburg-Bayreuth. In any case, Hofmeister (court master) von Brehmer, who lived in the Weferlinger household and later advanced to the Ansbach secret council, brought her to Sweden in 1734 under the pseudonym "Dorothea von Zeidewitz", on the condition that she should stay there forever. Until 1751 she lived in Ingestorp with Brehmer's wife.

In 1751 the 66-years-old Dorothea von Zeidewitz was sent to live under the care of the Swedish Count Nils Julius von Lewenhaupt, chief steward at the Bayreuth court, on whose estate Stäflö near Kalmar remained for the rest of her life, apparently on the instructions or with the approval of her son, Margrave Frederick of Brandenburg-Bayreuth, who also increased their annual allowance to §1000. However, the Margrave adhered to the harsh instructions of his father's will of 1735, according to which his mother was never again allowed to step on Bayreuth soil.

She died of a fever at Stäflö on 25 December 1761 aged 76 and was buried in at Åby Church in Läckeby near Kalmar. By that time, all her children, except Margrave Frederick of Brandenburg-Bayreuth (who died two years later in 1763), had predeceased her.

== Issue ==
1. Sophie Christiane Luise (b. Weferlingen, 4 January 1710 – d. Brussels, 13 June 1739), married on 11 April 1731 to Alexander Ferdinand, 3rd Prince of Thurn and Taxis.
2. Frederick (b. Weferlingen, 10 May 1711 – d. Bayreuth, 26 February 1763), successor of his father as Margrave of Bayreuth.
3. Wilhelm Ernst (b. Weferlingen, 26 July 1712 – d. Mantua, 7 November 1733).
4. Sophie Charlotte Albertine (b. Weferlingen, 27 July 1713 – d. Ilmenau, 2 March 1747), married on 7 April 1734 to Duke Ernst August I of Saxe-Weimar.
5. Sophie Wilhelmine (b. Weferlingen, 8 July 1714 – d. Aurich, 7 September 1749), married on 25 May 1734 to Prince Charles Edzard of East Frisia.

== Bibliography ==
- Anteckningar om svenska qvinnor (In Swedish)

Princess Dorothea of Schleswig-Holstein-Sonderburg-Beck House of Oldenburg Born: 24 November 1685 Died: 25 December 1761
German nobility
Vacant Title last held by Sophie Christiane of Wolfstein	Margravine of Brandenburg-Bayreuth-Kulmbach; 1709 – 1724	Title changed Georg Frederick Karl of Brandenburg-Bayreuth-Kulmbach became Margrave of Bayreuth in 1726
