= Princess Maria Augusta of Thurn and Taxis =

Duchess of Württemberg from 1733 to 1737

Princess Marie Auguste
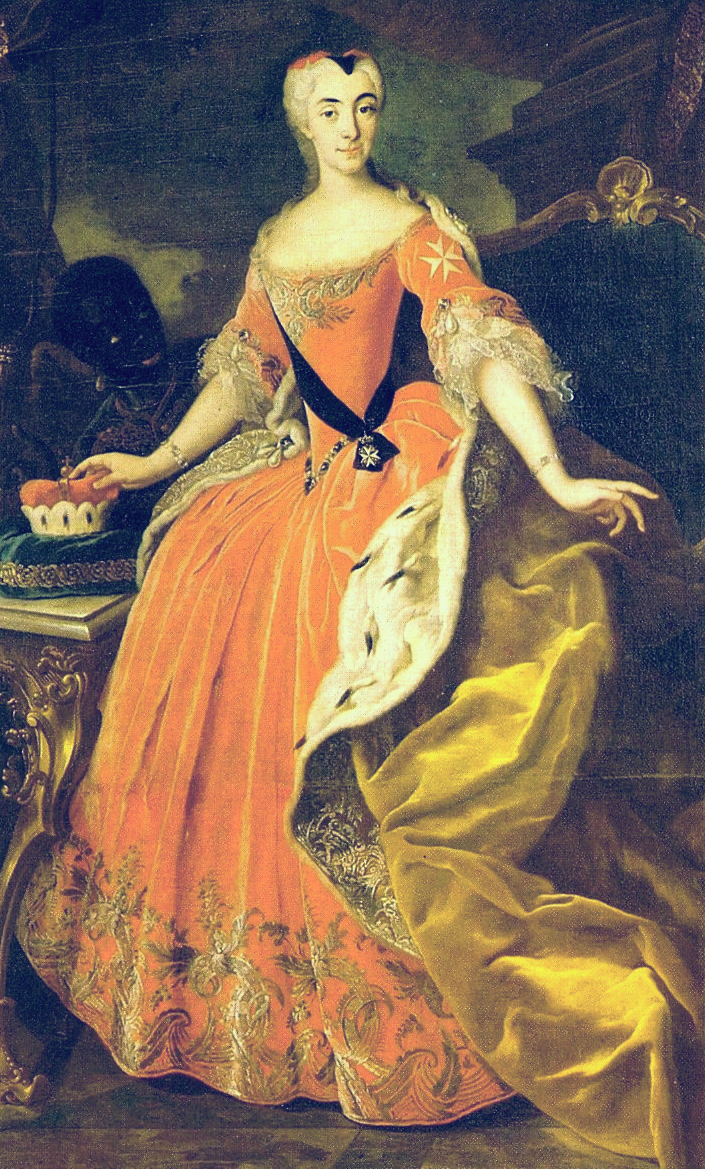
- Portrait by Johann Philipp von der Schlichten, 1735

Duchess consort of Württemberg
- Tenure: 31 October 1733 - 12 March 1737

Co-regent of Württemberg
- Co-regency: 12 March 1737 - 1740
- Born: 11 August 1706; Frankfurt am Main, Hesse
- Died: 1 February 1756 (aged 49); Göppingen, Duchy of Württemberg
- Spouse: Charles Alexander, Duke of Württemberg (m. 1727; died 1737)
- Issue: Charles Eugene, Duke of Württemberg; Louis Eugene, Duke of Württemberg; Frederick II Eugene, Duke of Württemberg; Auguste, Princess of Thurn and Taxis
Names
- German: Marie Auguste Anna
- House: Thurn and Taxis
- Father: Anselm Franz, 2nd Prince of Thurn and Taxis
- Mother: Maria Ludovika Anna Franziska, Princess of Lobkowicz

Princess Marie Auguste Anna of Thurn and Taxis (11 August 1706 – 1 February 1756) was a Regent of Württemberg. By birth she was a member of the Princely House of Thurn and Taxis and through her marriage to Karl Alexander, Duke of Württemberg, she became Duchess consort of Württemberg. She served as regent during the minority of her son between 1737 and 1744.

== Early life ==
Marie Auguste was born on 11 August 1706 as a daughter of Anselm Franz, 2nd Prince of Thurn and Taxis and his wife, Princess Maria Ludovika Anna Franziska of Lobkowicz (1683-1750). She grew up in the Austrian Netherlands and later moved to Frankfurt, where her family's wealth and economic interests were based. Her only brother was Alexander Ferdinand, 3rd Prince of Thurn and Taxis, whose son Karl Anselm would marry Marie Auguste's only daughter in 1753.

== Marriage and children ==
Marie Auguste was chosen as a bride for Karl Alexander, Duke of Württemberg-Winnental (later Duke of Württemberg) because of her Roman Catholic religion. They were married on 1 May 1727 in Frankfurt am Main. Despite their Catholicism, the couple's children were all raised in the Lutheran faith. They had four surviving children:

- Charles Eugene, Duke of Württemberg (1728–1793), married Elisabeth Fredericka Sophie of Brandenburg-Bayreuth; no issue.
- Eugen Louis (1729)
- Louis Eugene, Duke of Württemberg (1731–1795), married Sophie Albertine of Beichlingen; had issue.
- Frederick II Eugene, Duke of Württemberg (1732–1797), married Friederike Dorothea of Brandenburg-Schwedt; had issue including King Frederick I and Sophie Dorothea, Empress of Russia
- Alexander Eugen (1733–1734)
- Auguste Elisabeth (1734–1787), married Karl Anselm, 4th Prince of Thurn and Taxis; had issue.

Their ten-year marriage was turbulent, and they were generally felt to be each other's match in every way (as both were masters of intrigue and secret diplomacy). He often used a trusted servant to spy on his wife to ensure that she would not interfere in government or criticize the Duke's ministers. After a particularly serious dispute in 1736, her husband even had her promise in writing to stay out of government affairs.

== Regent ==
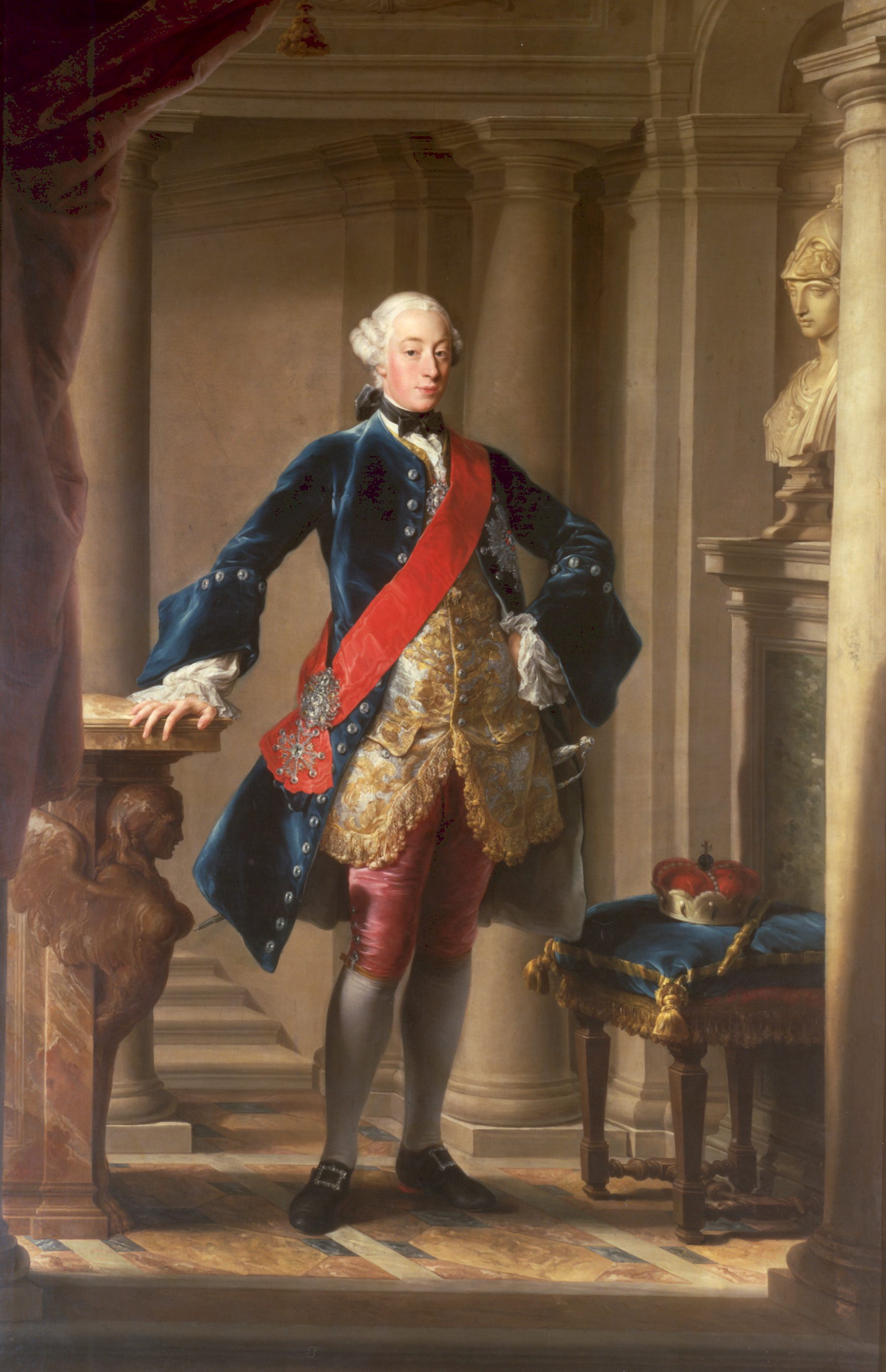
Marie Auguste's eldest son Charles

Marie Auguste's husband died suddenly on 12 March 1737 on the eve of his departure on a military inspection tour. This meant that their nine-year-old son Charles succeeded as Duke of Württemberg. After experiencing initial trouble from the regency council in trying to hold power for her son, she was finally successful on 5 November 1737. She was granted a large allowance and was recognized as co-regent with control over her son's education.

From 1739 to the following year, she had an affair with a captain in the army. Rumors of a possible pregnancy became so widespread that the privy council began an investigation; the captain was discharged and she was forced to stay in Brussels for five months (beginning in April 1740). Her exile removed her from direct power, especially when crucial policy decisions and preparations for her son's education were being made. For instance, she was unable to prevent a disastrous alliance with Prussia that would leave Württemberg exposed at the outbreak of the War of the Austrian Succession.

By 1744, however, Marie Auguste had again achieved a position of considerable influence. She arranged military careers for her two eldest sons, allowing them to receive commissions in the Prussian army. In 1748, she encouraged her eldest son, the Duke Charles Eugen, to enter into a marriage with the Hohenzollern Elisabeth Fredericka Sophie of Brandenburg-Bayreuth, a niece of Frederick the Great.

As a Catholic, she prepared her youngest son Frederick Eugen for a life in the Imperial Church. Her dreams for a life of religion for him fell apart, however, when in 1753 he became engaged to another niece of Frederick the Great, Friederike Dorothea of Brandenburg-Schwedt; he also became one of Frederick's most important cavalry commanders.

Marie Auguste's influence would decline as her son grew increasingly more independent by 1749. She died on 1 February 1756 in Göppingen, Württemberg.

== Personal attributes ==
Marie Auguste was often praised by contemporaries for her beauty. However, she was also often criticized for her lack of judgment and resolve. She also liked to openly demonstrate her rank as Duchess of Württemberg by spending lavishly, which set her at odds with her thrifty subjects. For instance, her wardrobe contained 228 dresses; the most expensive cost 500 florins, which was more than 30 times a servant's annual income.

Although often portrayed as an intellectual lightweight, she owned a large library that contained the latest novels, plays, and philosophy. She maintained a correspondence with Voltaire, and also was a friend of the philosopher Marquis d'Argens.

== Sources ==
- Wilson, Peter H. (2004). "Women and Imperial Politics: The Württemberg Consorts 1674–1757" in Queenship in Europe 1660–1815: The Role of the Consort. Clarissa Campbell Orr (ed.). Cambridge University Press. ISBN 0-521-81422-7.

Princess Maria Augusta of Thurn and Taxis House of Thurn and Taxis Cadet branch of the House of Tassis Born: 11 August 1706 Died: 1 February 1756
Regnal titles
Preceded by Eleonore Juliane of Brandenburg-Ansbach	Duchess consort of Württemberg-Winnental; 1 May 1727 – 12 March 1737	Succeeded by Elisabeth Fredericka Sophie of Brandenburg-Bayreuth
Preceded by Joanna Elisabeth of Baden-Durlach	Duchess consort of Württemberg-Stuttgart; 31 October 1733 – 12 March 1737	Succeeded by Elisabeth Fredericka Sophie of Brandenburg-Bayreuth
