= Duchess Auguste of Württemberg =

Duchess Auguste
- Princess of Thurn and Taxis
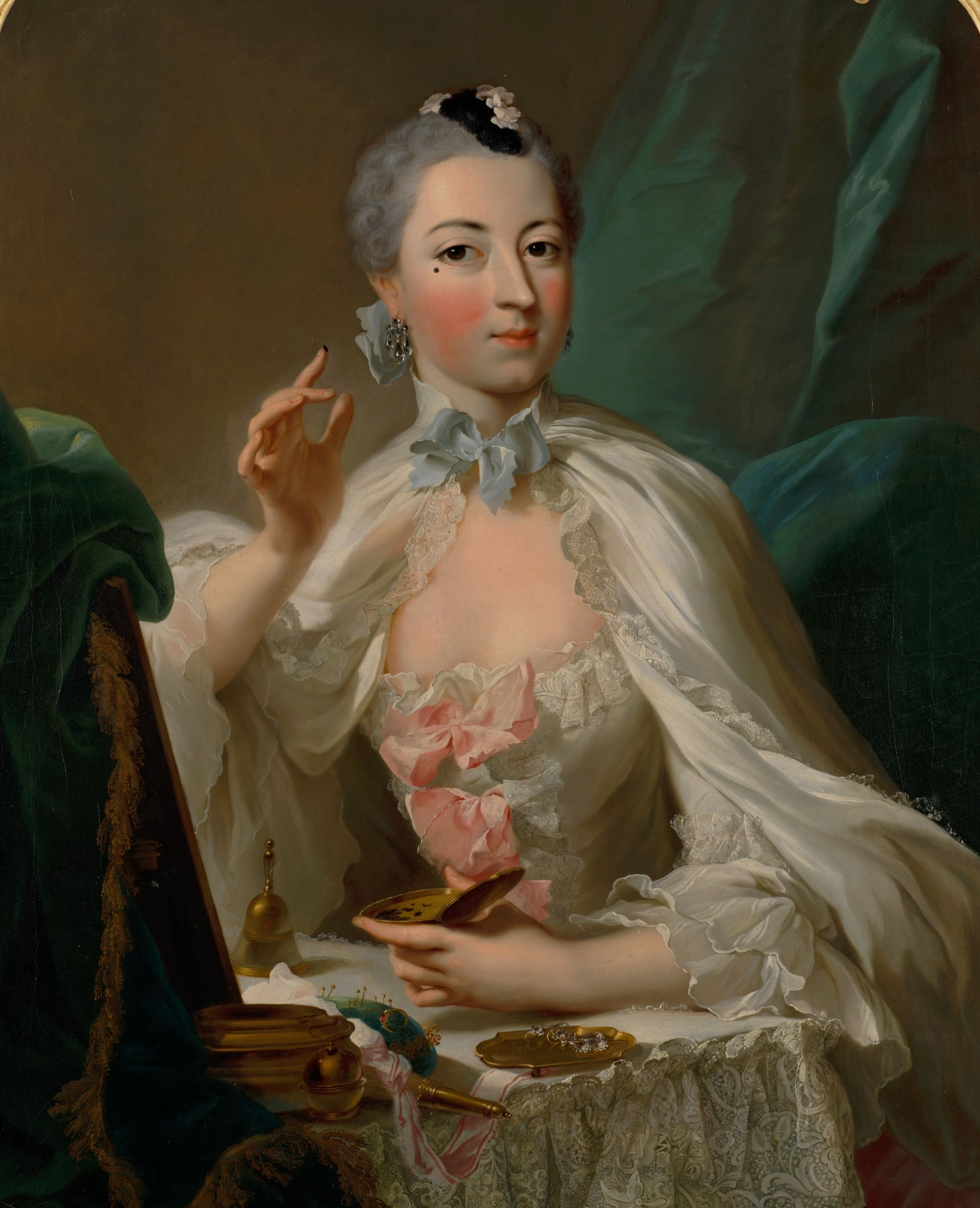
- Portrait by Johann Heinrich Tischbein, 1754

Princess consort of Thurn and Taxis
- Tenure: 17 March 1773 – 1776
- Born: 30 October 1734; Stuttgart, Duchy of Württemberg, Holy Roman Empire
- Died: 4 June 1787 (aged 52); Hornberg, Duchy of Württemberg, Holy Roman Empire
- Spouse: Karl Anselm, 4th Prince of Thurn and Taxis (m. 1753)
- Issue: Princess Maria Theresia; Princess Sophie Friederike; Prince Franz Johann Nepomuck; Princess Henrica Karoline; Prince Alexander Karl; Princess Friederike Dorothea; Karl Alexander, 5th Prince of Thurn and Taxis; Prince Friedrich Johann Nepomuck
Names
- German: Auguste Elisabeth Marie
- House: Württemberg
- Father: Karl Alexander, Duke of Württemberg
- Mother: Princess Maria Augusta of Thurn and Taxis

Duchess Auguste Elisabeth Marie of Württemberg (in German: Auguste Elisabeth Marie, Herzogin von Württemberg; 30 October 1734 – 4 June 1787) was a member of the Ducal House of Württemberg and a Duchess of Württemberg by birth. Through her marriage to Karl Anselm, 4th Prince of Thurn and Taxis, Auguste was also a member of the Princely House of Thurn and Taxis and Princess consort of Thurn and Taxis.

== Life ==
Auguste was the sixth and youngest child of Karl Alexander, Duke of Württemberg and his wife Princess Maria Augusta of Thurn and Taxis. In her youth, she had lived with her mother, until she entered the exclusive Ursuline convent in Metz in 1750. In 1752, her eldest brother Karl Eugen had wanted her to marry a French prince of the blood to assist in his reorientation of Württemberg policy towards France. The match fell through however, and to save the cost of maintaining Auguste, she was instead married off to her maternal cousin Karl Anselm, 4th Prince of Thurn and Taxis.

Auguste married Karl Anselm, 4th Prince of Thurn and Taxis on 3 September 1753 in Stuttgart, Duchy of Württemberg. The couple settled in a wing of the Saint Emmeram’s Abbey in Regensburg. The marriage was arranged and unhappy. Auguste gave birth repeatedly until she suffered a difficult miscarriage in 1768, after which her health was damaged for a long time. In 1770, she gave birth to the first son who reached adulthood. Karl Anselm took many mistresses, and Auguste complained of ill-treatment to her brother, who wrote to her father-in-law, demanding more respect for his sister.

On 17 March 1773, Auguste’s spouse succeeded as the 4th Prince of Thurn and Taxis. The marriage was at that point severely deteriorated. Auguste left Karl Anselm and settled in Paris. Rumours claimed that she lived with a lover. However, she was tormented by economical problems, ran out of funds and was hounded by creditors.

In 1775, Auguste returned to Regensburg to attend the wedding of her daughter. Karl Anselm believed Auguste was plotting to murder him, and had her abducted and escorted from Regensburg. Auguste was first told that she was escorted to her brother in Stuttgart, but she was instead taken to Burg Trugenhofen (later renamed Schloss Taxis) in Dischingen, where she was imprisoned. She was later removed to strict house arrest at Schloss Hornberg in the Black Forest, where she died on 4 June 1787. Following the death of his first wife, Karl Anselm married that same year morganatically to Elisabeth Hildebrand.

== Marriage and issue ==
Auguste and Karl Anselm, 4th Prince of Thurn and Taxis had eight children:

- Princess Maria Theresia of Thurn and Taxis (born 10 July 1757 † 9 March 1776)

∞ 25 August 1774 Kraft Ernst, Prince of Oettingen-Oettingen und Oettingen-Wallerstein (born about 1748 † 1802)

- Princess Sophie Friederike of Thurn and Taxis (born 20 July 1758; † 31 May 1800)

∞ 31 December 1775 Prince Hieronim Wincenty Radziwiłł (11 May 1759-18 September 1786)
∞ around 1795 Prince Andrzej Kazanowski
∞ 1797 to a Count Mikolai Ostrorog

- Prince Franz Johann Nepomuck of Thurn and Taxis (baptized 2 October 1759; † 22 January 1760)
- Princess Henrica Karoline of Thurn and Taxis (baptized 25 April 1762; † 25 April 1784)

∞ 21 April 1783 with Johannes Aloysius II, Prince of Oettingen-Oettingen and Oettingen-Spielberg

- Prince Alexander Karl of Thurn and Taxis (born 19 April 1763; † 21 April 1763)
- Princess Friederike Dorothea of Thurn and Taxis (born 11 September 1764 † 10 November 1764)
- Karl Alexander, 5th Prince of Thurn and Taxis (born 22 February 1770; † 15 July 1827)

∞ 25 May 1789 with Duchess Therese of Mecklenburg-Strelitz

- Prince Friedrich Johann Nepomuck of Thurn and Taxis (born 11 April 1772 † 7 December 1805), unmarried

== Sources ==
- Wilson, Peter H. (2004). "Women and Imperial Politics: The Württemberg Consorts 1674–1757" in Queenship in Europe 1660–1815: The Role of the Consort. Clarissa Campbell Orr (ed.). Cambridge University Press. ISBN 0-521-81422-7.

Duchess Auguste of Württemberg House of Württemberg Born: 30 October 1734 Died: 4 June 1787
German nobility
| Preceded by Princess Maria Henriette Josepha of Fürstenberg-Stühlingen | Princess consort of Thurn and Taxis; 17 March 1773–1776 | Succeeded by Duchess Therese of Mecklenburg-Strelitz |
