= Ludwik Mycielski =

Polish politician (1854–1926)

Ludwik Mycielski (13 April 1854, Warsaw – 6 January 1926) was a Polish politician, president of the National Council (Rada Narodowa) in 1913.

== Biography ==
He was the son of Michał, a publicist and publisher (after the death of his wife, a Jesuit, provincial of the Galician Order) and Zofia née Górski. After the early loss of his mother and his father's entry into the order, he was brought up in the house of his grandmother, Teodosia Górska (widow of General Franciszek Górski), and then with his uncle Stanisław. In 1873 he passed his high school diploma in Śrem and began his studies in Wrocław, which were continued in Louvain in Belgium and at the Jagiellonian University, where in 1878 he defended his doctorate in philosophy on the basis of the dissertation Sprawa układ między Zygmuntem III a dworem austriam o podeniu korony polskiej (The Matter of Agreements Between Sigismund III and the Austrian Court on the Descent of the Polish Crown).
