= Zygmunt Mycielski =

Polish composer and music critic (1907–1987)

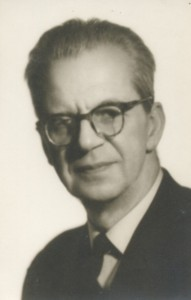
Zygmunt Mycielski

Count Zygmunt Mycielski (17 August 1907 – 5 August 1987) was a Polish composer and music critic.

== Life and career ==
He was born in Przeworsk and completed his childhood education in Kraków, where he was taught by Bernardino Rizzi. In 1928, Mycielski moved to Paris, where he studied composition at École Normale de Musique with Paul Dukas and Nadia Boulanger, as probably the latter's first Polish student. While there, he served as president of the Association of Young Polish Musicians in Paris from 1934 to 1936. In 1936, he moved back to Poland and began his music and writing career.

Mycielski served in the Polish military during World War II and became a prisoner of war after being captured by the German Army. For the rest of the war, he did compulsory work for a German farmer. After the war ended, he returned to Poland and served two terms as editor for Ruch Muzyczny (1946–1948 and 1957–1959) before becoming editor-in-chief from 1960 to 1968. His political views clashed with communist Polish authorities, however. His publications caused him to be ousted as editor-in-chief of Ruch Muzyczny; his writings were then subject to strict censorship and he was forbidden to leave the country.

Mycielski continued his political activism though. In 1975, he signed a group letter with other Polish intellectuals protesting proposed changes to the Polish constitution by the Communist party. In 1978, he founded the Academic Education Society, a student organisation that was deemed illegal and later banned.

Mycielski died in Warsaw and he was buried in Wiśniowa on the Wisłok River.
