= Jan Ostroróg =

Polish writer (1436–1501)

Jan Ostroróg (1436–1501) was a Polish political writer, voivode of Poznań and adviser to the Polish kings Casimir IV Jagiellon and John I Albert.

Ostroróg came from the old Polish nobility of the Ostroróg. He studied law at the universities of Erfurt and Bologna. He was a proponent of strong central authority of the monarchy, calling for reforms within the Roman Catholic Church and the law (he promoted equality of all classes before the law). In his work Memoriał o urządzeniu Rzeczypospolitej, written around 1475, he advocated fundamental reforms of the state, as well as the separation of state and church and the introduction of universal conscription.

His marriage to the Ratibor princess Helene, the daughter of Wenceslaus II, Duke of Opava-Ratibor, a direct descendant of Ottokar II of Bohemia, produced the sons Wacław and Stanisław Ostroróg.
