= Ostroróg =

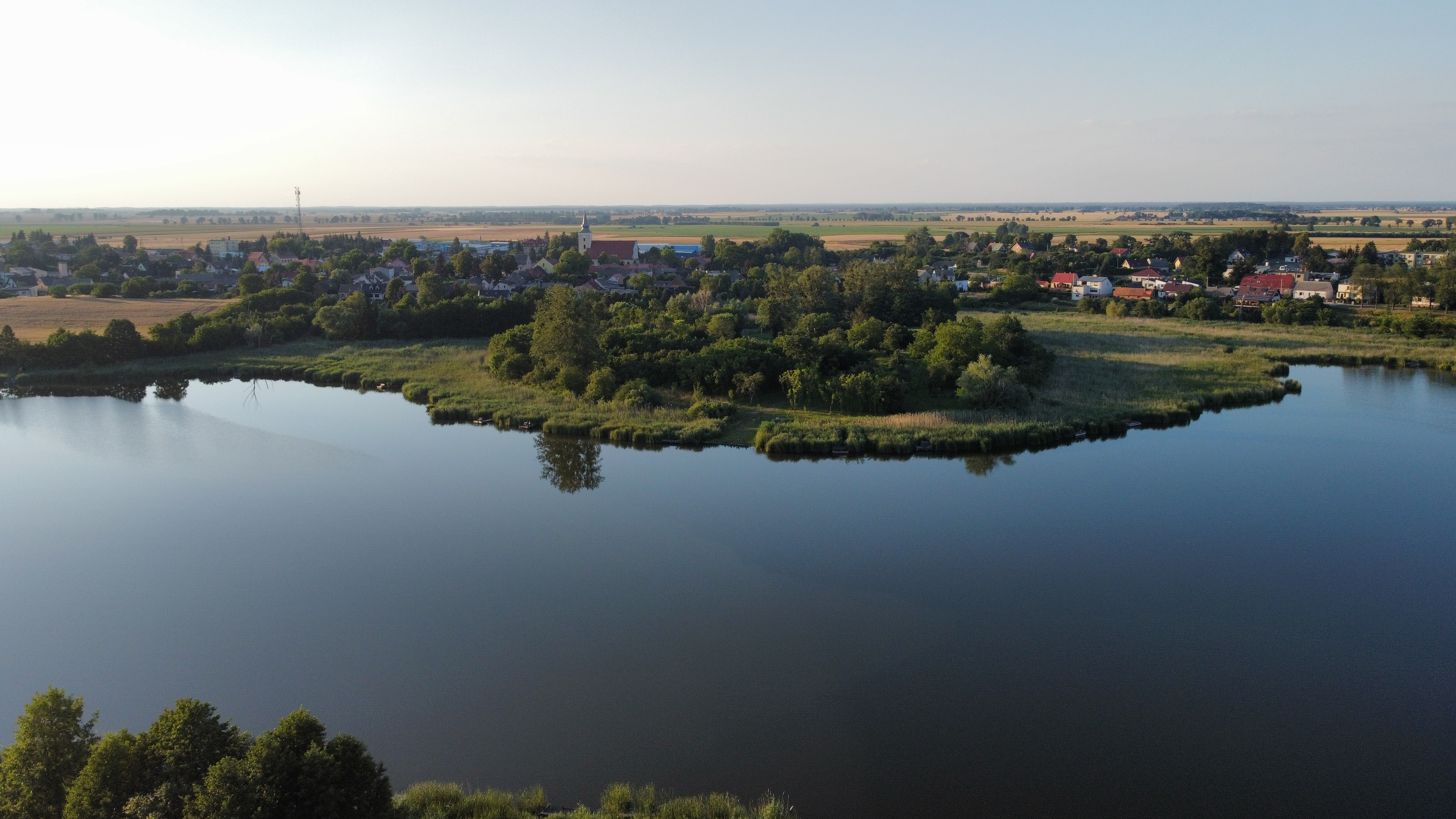
- Aerial view of Ostroróg and Wielkie Lake

- Flag Coat of arms

- Location within Poland
- Coordinates: 52°38′N 16°28′E
- Country: Poland
- Voivodeship: Greater Poland
- County: Szamotuły
- Gmina: Ostroróg

Area
  - Total: 1.26 km^{2} (0.49 sq mi)

Population (2010)
  - Total: 1,962
  - Density: 1,560/km^{2} (4,030/sq mi)
- Time zone: UTC+1 (CET)
  - Summer (DST): UTC+2 (CEST)
- Postal code: 64-560
- Area code: +48 61
- Vehicle registration: PSZ
- Website: http://www.ostrorog.pl/

Ostroróg [ɔsˈtrɔruk] is a town in Szamotuły County, Greater Poland Voivodeship, in western Poland, with 1,962 inhabitants (2010).

== History ==
Ostroróg was first mentioned in 1383. It was granted town rights before 1412. There was a hospital in the town from 1472. The town's location was confirmed by the Polish king Sigismund I the Old in 1546. Ostroróg was a private town of Poland, until 1624 owned by the Ostroróg family. Jan Ostroróg, Polish Renaissance political writer and statesman, was born there in 1436. Jakub Ostroróg also owned property here in the 16th century. Between the 16th and 17th centuries it was an important centre of Polish Protestants. After 1624, it often changed owners, it was the property of Potocki, Rej, Górski, Radziwiłł, Zaleski, Malechowski, Sapieha and Kwilecki families.

After the Partitions of Poland it was annexed by Prussia. After the successful Greater Poland uprising of 1806, it was regained by Poles and included within the short-lived Duchy of Warsaw. In 1815 it was annexed again by Prussia, initially as part of the autonomous Grand Duchy of Poznan. During the Greater Poland Uprising, the town was taken over by its inhabitants, and as a result it returned to Poland, after the country regained independence in 1918.

== Demographics ==
Historical population

Year	Pop.	±%
1880	1,023	—
1910	1,267	+23.9%
1921	1,273	+0.5%
1931	1,289	+1.3%

Year	Pop.	±%
1939	1,301	+0.9%
1950	1,127	−13.4%
1960	1,355	+20.2%
2010	1,962	+44.8%

== Notable people ==
- Jan Ostroróg (1436–1501), Polish Renaissance political writer and statesman
- Andrzej Węgierski (1600–1649), Polish Calvinist historian, preacher and poet
