= Simon III of Lippe =

Simon III, Lord of Lippe
- Born: c. 1340
- Died: 1410
- Noble family: House of Lippe
- Spouse: Irmgard of Hoya
- Issue: Bernard VI, Lord of Lippe
- Father: Otto, Lord of Lippe
- Mother: Irmgard of the Marck

Simon III, Lord of Lippe (c. 1340 – 1410) was Lord of Lippe from 1360 until his death.

He was the son of Otto, from whom he inherited the city of Lemgo. His control of the surrounding areas was initially uncertain. As late as 1368, the castellans of his castles and representatives of the cities of Horn, Detmold and Blomberg published a joint declaration, stating that in the future, they would only recognize the heir as their sovereign only if the two main cities in the Lordship, Lippstadt and Lemgo, would agree.

In the ancestral lands around the cities of Lippstadt and Rheda, however, the situation was complicated, because after the death of his uncle Bernard V, around 1365, his widow Richarda had initially given his part of Lippe to Count Otto VI of Tecklenburg, who was the husband of her eldest daughter. In 1366, she had revoked the gift and acknowledged Simon III as her husband's heir. Otto VI, however, refused to return the gift. This led to a struggle that would last several decades.

Matters were further complicated when Otto VI took Simon III prisoner in 1371. Simon III was released in 1374, but he had to pay a very high ransom. He ended up having to pledge half of Lippstadt in 1376 to the relatives of his mother, the House of La Marck.

In 1379, a short-lived alliance consisting of the bishoprics of Paderborn, Münster and Osnabrück, the cities of Münster and Osnabrück, and Count Engelbert III of the Marck conquered the Lordship and City of Rheda. However, they did not hand it to Simon III. Instead, they gave it back to Otto VI, after the latter had paid 8000 guilders.

Around 1400, the cities of Barntrup and Salzuflen and Sternberg Castle were pledged to Simon III. In 1405, the rest of the County of Sternberg followed.

In 1403, Simon III agreed a treaty of inheritance with the childless Count Herman VII of Everstein. However, the Dukes of Brunswick-Lüneburg objected. They claimed that Everstein was a fief of Brunswick, and would therefore fall back to them when the Everstein family died out. In 1405, the conflict escalated to a feud, which was fought mostly on Lippe's territory. In 1408, Herman VII renounced his rights and gave Everstein to Brunswick.

Simon III was married to Irmgard of Hoya and had seven children.

He died in 1410 and was succeeded by his eldest son, Bernard VI.

Simon III of Lippe House of Lippe Born: c. 1340 Died: 1410
Preceded by Otto	Lord of Lippe; 1360–1410	Succeeded by Bernard VI
Preceded by Otto VI as Count of Tecklenburg	Lord of Rheda; 1366–1410	Succeeded by Bernard VI
