= Nicholas II, Count of Tecklenburg =

- Died: 1426
- Noble family: House of Hagen
- Spouse: Anna of Moers
- Father: Otto VI, Count of Tecklenburg
- Mother: Adelaide of Lippe

Nicholas II of Tecklenburg (died 1426) was the ruling Count of Tecklenburg from 1388 until his death.

== Life ==
Nicholas II was the only son of Count Otto VI and his wife, Adelaide of Lippe, a daughter of Bernard V, Lord of Lippe.

Like his father, Nicholas II fought many feuds. In 1338, he succeeded his father as Count of Tecklenburg. In his feud against Lippe, he gained the Lordship of Rheda, and had to cede territory to Lippe in return.

In 1400, the bishops of Münster and Osnabrück joined forces and fought against Nicholas II. He lost northern parts of his territory, such as Cloppenburg, Vechta, Friesoythe and Bevergern, to the Bishop of Münster. In Lower Lingen, he lost half the parish of Plantlünne and Schapen and the forests of Stade and Spelle. He was left with the oldest part of the County of Tecklenburg-Lingen, including Ibbenbüren, Iburg, Lienen, Ladbergen and other towns. His territory was complete surrounded by the two bishoprics.

Later in his life, Nicholas II fought further feuds against the bishops of Münster and Osnabrück and the Counts of Hoya. He assisted his cousin Nicholas of Oldenburg-Delmenhorst, who was Archbishop of Bremen against East Frisia. In 1426, they lost the Battle of Detern.

== Marriage and issue ==
Nicholas II married Anna Elisabeth of Moers (d. 1430), a daughter of Frederick III, Count of Moers. They had the following children:

- Otto VII (d. 1450), Count of Tecklenburg
- Adelheid (d. 1428), married to William VIII of Jülich, Count of Ravensberg
