= Bernard IV of Lippe =

Bernard IV, Lord of Lippe
- Lord of Lippe
- Born: c. 1230; Brake, near Lemgo
- Died: June 1275
- Buried: Marienfeld Abbey
- Noble family: House of Lippe
- Spouse: Agnes of Cleves
- Issue Detail: Simon I, Lord of Lippe
- Father: Bernard III, Lord of Lippe
- Mother: Sophie of Cuijck-Arnsberg

Bernhard IV, Lord of Lippe (c. 1230 in Brake – June 1275) was a ruling Lord of Lippe.

== Life ==
He was the eldest son of Bernard III and his wife, Sofie of Cuijck-Arnsberg.

In 1254, he took up government of Rheda and in 1265, he succeeded his father as ruler of Lippe. His brother Herman III inherited the city of Lippstadt.

With his uncle, Bishop Simon I of Paderborn, he fought in the Battle of Zülpich of 1267 against the Duchy of Jülich. Simon was captured. In 1269, Bernard IV paid a large ransom to secure Simon's release. He had to borrow the money, causing the House of Lippe to be burdened by debt.

At different times during his reign, he was regent of Ravensberg, had a dispute with the city of Lippstadt, which had joined the Rhenish League of Cities, and was liege lord of Vehmic court in Wesenfort.

He died in 1275, and was buried in Marienfeld Abbey.

== Marriage and issue ==
In 1260, Bernard married Agnes (c. 1232 – c. 1 August 1285), a daughter of Count Dietrich V of Cleves and Hedwig of Meißen. Agnes and Bernard had the following children:

- Simon Iz (c. 1261 – 10 August 1344), married Countess Adelaide of Waldeck and had issue
- Elisabeth (b. c. 1273), married Count Henry III of Solms-Braunfels and had issue

== Footnotes ==
Bernard IV of Lippe House of Lippe Born: c. 1230 Died: June 1275
Preceded by Bernard III	Lord of Rheda; 1254–1275	Succeeded by Simon I
Preceded by Bernard III	Lord of Lippe; 1265–1275	Succeeded by Simon I
