= Bernard V =

Bernard V may refer to:

- Bernard V of Armagnac, Count of Armagnac
- Bernard V, Lord of Lippe (c. 1290 – before 1365)
- Bernard V of Lippe (1277–1341), German nobleman, bishop of Paderborn
- Bernard V and Beatrice of Melgueil
