= Otto, Count of Ravensberg =

Count of Ravensberg (1306-1328)

Otto IV
- Count of Ravensberg
- Born: c. 1276
- Died: 1328
- Noble family: House of Calvelage-Ravensberg
- Spouse: Margaret of Berg-Windeck
- Father: Otto III of Ravensberg
- Mother: Hedwig of Lippe

Otto IV, Count of Ravensberg (c. 1276 – 1328) was a German nobleman. He was the ruling Count of Ravensberg from 1306 until his death.

Otto was the fifth child of Count Otto III and his wife Hedwig of Lippe (c. 1238 – 5 March 1315), daughter of Bernard III, Lord of Lippe.

== Marriage and descendants ==
In 1313, Otto IV married Margaret of Berg-Windeck. Together, they had two daughters:

- Hedwig (d. after 1387) married Duke William II of Brunswick-Lüneburg
- Margaret (c. 1320 – 19 February 1389) married Gerhard VI of Jülich, Count of Berg and Ravensberg
