= Frederick III of Moers =

Frederick III, Count of Moers
- Born: 1354
- Died: 12 May 1417
- Noble family: House of Moers
- Spouse: Walburga of Saarwerden
- Father: Dietrich IV of Moers
- Mother: Elisabeth of Zuilen

Frederick III of Moers (1354 – 12 May 1417) was a nobleman from the Holy Roman Empire. He was Count of Moers by inheritance and Count of Saarwerden by jure uxoris.

== Life ==
Frederick was the son of Count Dietrich IV of Moers and his wife Elisabeth of Zuilen, heiress of Baër. He succeeded his father as Count of Moers in 1372, at the age of 17, and ruled the county for the next 45 years.

Already during the first month of his reign, he requested and received three privileges from Emperor Charles IV: the village of Creyfeld received the status of a market town and the right to hold to fairs annually, and the House of Moers received the right to mint coins. This right was first exercised in 1405, by his son John. These privileges and the increasing influence of the count rekindled the envy of Count Adolf III of the Marck (d. 1394), who claimed that Moers was a fief of Cleves.

== Marriage ==
On 10 September 1376, Frederick married Walburga (sometimes spelled Walburgis), the daughter of John II of Saarwerden and his wife Clara of Vinstingen. The marriage had been mediated by Walburga's brother Frederick, who was Archbishop of Cologne and wanted closer a relationship with the Counts of Moers, to reduce the influence in the Lower Rhine area of his nemesis Adolf III of the Marck. In 1397, Walburga's brother Henry II died without a male heir, and Frederick III inherited the County of Saarwerden jure uxoris.

== Last will and testament ==
In 1417 Frederick made a last will and testament in which he left the County of Moers to his son in fideicommis. This meant that if a Count were to die without a male heir, the county would be inherited by a younger brother (or his son), and not fell back to the Duke of Cleves. This did not work for very long: Count William of Wied, who had married Frederick III's great-granddaughter Margaret, managed, with support from Duke William IV of Jülich-Berg to snatch Moers away from Frederick III's great-grandson John IV.

Frederick III died on 12 May 1417 and his possessions were inherited by his eldest son, Frederick IV, who had been born c. 1377.

== Issue ==
From his marriage with Walburga, he had the following children:

- Frederick (c. 1377 – 11 July 1448), inherited Moers as Frederick IV
- John (c. 1384 – 2 July 1431), inherited Saarwerden as John III
- Dietrich (c. 1385 – 14 February 1463), who was Archbishop of Cologne as Dietrich II and Bishop of Paderborn as Dietrich III
- Henry (probably 1391 –1450), Bishop of Munster and Osnabrück as Henry II
- Walram (c. 1393 – 3 October 1456), Bishop of Utrecht and of Münster
- Anna Elizabeth, married
  1. in 1403 with Lord Bernard VI of Lippe (d. 1415)
  2. Nicholas II, Count of Tecklenburg (d. 1430)
- Walburga, the youngest daughter, married in 1406 with John III, Lord of Heinsberg

It is an ancestor of Anne of Cleves.

== Footnotes ==
Frederick III of Moers House of Moers Born: 1354 Died: 12 May 1417
Preceded by Dietrich IV	Count of Moers; 1372-1417	Succeeded by Frederick IV
Preceded by Henry II	Count of Saarwerden jure uxoris 1399-1417	Succeeded by John III
