= Bernard III =

Bernard III may refer to:

- Bernard III, Lord of Lippe (ruled in 1230–1265)
- Bernard III, Duke of Saxony (c. 1140–1212)
- Bernhard III, Duke of Saxe-Meiningen (1851–1928)
