= Margaret of Berg-Windeck =

German noblewoman

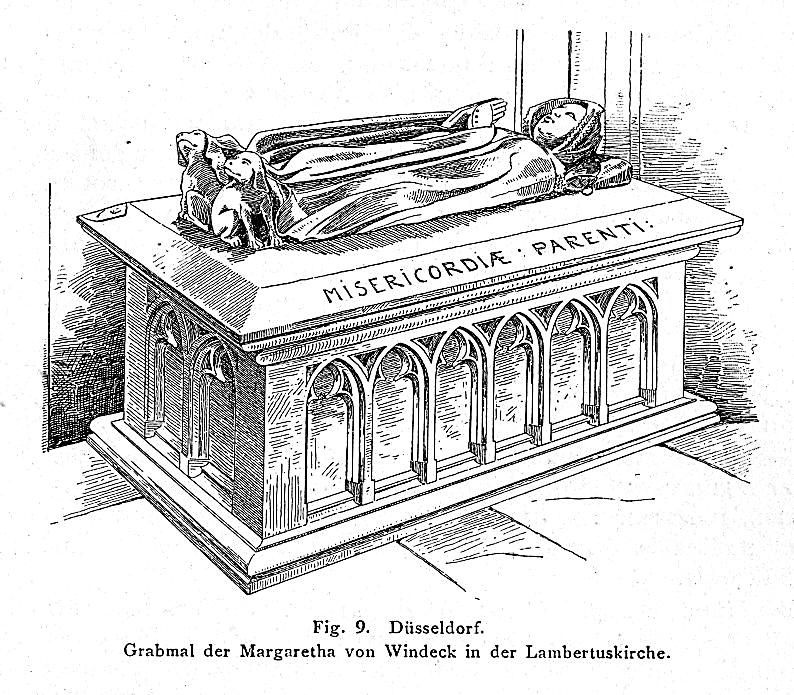
- Margaret's tomb in the St. Lambertus in Düsseldorf-Altstadt
- Born: c. 1275/1280
- Died: between 1339 and 1346
- Buried: St. Lambertus in Düsseldorf-Altstadt
- Noble family: House of Limburg
- Spouse: Otto IV, Count of Ravensberg
- Father: Henry of Berg, Lord of Windeck
- Mother: Agnes of the Marck

Margaret of Berg-Windeck (c. 1275/1280 – between 1339 and 1346) was a German noblewoman.

== Life ==
She was the only daughter of Henry of Berg, Lord of Windeck and his wife Agnes of the Marck.

In 1313, she married Otto IV, a son of Count Otto III of Ravensberg. Margaret and Otto had a daughter, Margaret, who in married Duke Gerhard VI of Jülich in 1338

Otto IV died in 1328, and as he had no son, Ravensberg was inherited by his younger brother Bernard. When Bernard died childless in 1346, Margaret's daughter inherited the County of Ravensberg.

She was last mentioned as being alive in 1339. She is not mentioned in 1346, when her daughter inherited the County, which would suggest that she had probably died already.

When Margaret's brother Adolf IX of Berg died childless in 1348, her daughter inherited the Duchy of Berg.

Margaret was buried in the St. Lambertus in Düsseldorf-Altstadt.
