= Simon I of Lippe =

Simon I, Lord of Lippe
- Born: c. 1261
- Died: 10 August 1344
- Noble family: House of Lippe
- Spouse: Adelaide of Waldeck
- Issue Detail: Bernard V, Lord of Lippe; Otto, Lord of Lippe; Bernard V of Lippe
- Father: Bernard IV, Lord of Lippe
- Mother: Agnes of Cleves

Simon I, Lord of Lippe (c. 1261 – 10 August 1344) ruled Lippe from 1275 until his death in 1344.

== Life ==
He was the son of Bernard IV and Agnes of Cleves. He was a great-nephew of Simon I, a bishop of Paderborn.

In 1302 he was defeated in a territorial dispute against the bishops of Münster, Osnabrück and Paderborn, the Count of Counts of Ravensberg and the City of Herford. He was forced to raze Enger Castle, which he owned. The dispute was triggered by complaints about raids against Osnabrück, allegedly originating from this castle. Louis of Ravensberg, who was the Bishop of Osnabrück, created an alliance with his brother, Count Otto III of Ravensberg, the Bishops of Münster and Paderborn and the City of Herford. Alliance troops laid siege to Simon I's castle in 1302, took the castle, captured Simon I and held him in the Bucksturm tower in Osnabrück. He was released after 18 months in captivity, under the condition that he would raze Enger Castle.

In 1323, he expanded his territory by acquiring Varenholz Castle and high justice over Langenholzhausen. During his reign, Lippe reached its largest territorial extent.

== Marriage and issue ==
He married Adelaide of Waldeck, the daughter of Lord Henry III of Waldeck. Their children were:

- Bernard (1277-1341), Bishop of Paderborn
- Herman (d. c. 1324), a cleric
- Hendrik (d. c. 1336), a cleric
- Diedrich (d. after 8 September 1326), Knight in the Teutonic Order
- Simon II (d. c. 1332), Lord of Lippe
- Otto († 1360), Lord of Lippe in Lemgo
- Bernard V (d. before 1365), Lord of Lippe in Rheda
- Adolph
- Matilda (d. after 9 April 1366), married c. 1310 to John II, Count of Bentheim (d. 1332)
- Adelaide, married Herman II of Everstein-Polle (about September 29, 1324?) (d. c. 1351)
- Hedwig (d. after March 5, 1369), married Count Adolph VII of Holstein-Pinneburg and Schauenburg (d. 1352).

== Footnotes ==
Simon I of Lippe House of Lippe Born: c. 1261 Died: 10 August 1344
Preceded by Bernard IV	Lord of Lippe; 1273–1344	Succeeded by Otto
Preceded by Bernard IV	Lord of Rheda; 1273–1344	Succeeded by Bernard V
