= Simon IV of Lippe =

Simon IV, Lord of Lippe
- Born: c. 1404
- Died: 11 August 1429
- Noble family: House of Lippe
- Spouse: Margaret of Brunswick-Grubenhagen
- Issue Detail: Bernard VII, Lord of Lippe
- Father: Bernard VI, Lord of Lippe
- Mother: Elisabeth of Moers

Simon IV, Lord of Lippe (c. 1404 – 11 August 1429) was the ruling Lord of Lippe from 1415 until his death.

== Life ==
He was born around 1404 as the eldest son of Bernard VI, Lord of Lippe and his second wife, Elisabeth of Moers. Bernard VI died in 1415 and Simon IV inherited Lippe.

In 1424 Count Adolph IX of Schauenburg tried to reconquer the County of Sternberg, which Schauenburg had pledged to Lippe in 1400. This led to a bitter feud, during which Extertal and the church and castle of Bösingfeld were destroyed. However, Simon IV took appropriate countermeasures and in the end, he prevailed and retained Sternberg.

In Osterholz he built a hunting lodge with a moat. Its main building was demolished in 1775.

== Marriage and issue ==
Around 1426, Simon IV married with Margaret (1411 – 31 October 1456), the daughter of Duke Eric I of Brunswick-Grubenhagen. They had two sons:

- Bernard "the Bellicose" (1428-1511), who succeeded as Lord of Lippe
- Simon (1430-1498), who became Prince-Bishop of Paderborn

Simon IV of Lippe House of Lippe Born: c. 1404 Died: 11 August 1429
| Preceded by Bernard VI | Lord of Lippe; 1415–1429 | Succeeded by Bernard VII |
