= Gisbert VI of Bronckhorst-Borculo =

- Coat of arms of the Lords of Bronckhorst
- Born: c. 1367
- Died: 1 November 1409
- Noble family: van Bronckhorst
- Spouse: Hedwig of Tecklenburg
- Father: William IV of Bronckhorst
- Mother: Kunigunde of Moers

Coat of arms of the Lordship of Borculo

Gisbert VI of Bronckhorst-Borculo (c. 1367 – 1 November 1409) was a Dutch nobleman. He was a son of William IV of Bronckhorst and Kunigunde of Moers. He was the ruling Lord of Bronckhorst from 1399 until his death, and the ruling Lord of Borculo from 1402 until his death. He was the sixth Lord of Bronckhorst named Gisbert, but only the second who also ruled Borculo. Some authors therefore call him Gisbert II of Bronckhorst-Borculo.

== Lordship of Borculo ==
Gisbert was the second Lord of Borculo from the House of Bronckhorst. He inherited the heerlijkheid in 1402 from his paternal uncle Gisbert I of Bronckhorst-Borculo. In 1406, he saw himself forced to acknowledge the Bishop of Münster as the liege lord of Borculo and Lichtenvoorde. Later Lords of Bronckhorst-Borculo also acknowledged the Bishops of Münster as their liege lord.

== Marriage and issue ==
Gisbert married Hedwig, the daughter of Count Otto VI, Count of Tecklenburg and Adelaide of Lippe. They had three sons together:

- William (b. 1390)
- Otto (1392 – 23 February 1458), 3rd Lord of Bronckhorst and Borculo
- Frederick, died unmarried in 1405
- Kunigunda van Bronckhorst married Jan II van Montfoort about 1422 and had at least one son (Hendrick IV)
