= House of Lippe =

Former German royal house

- Country: Principality of Lippe, Schaumburg-Lippe
- Founded: 1123; 903 years ago
- Founder: Bernhard I
- Current head: Stephan, Prince of Lippe
- Final ruler: Leopold IV
- Titles: Lord, Count, Prince
- Deposition: 1918
- Cadet branches: Lippe-Biesterfeld; Lippe-Weissenfeld; Schaumburg-Lippe

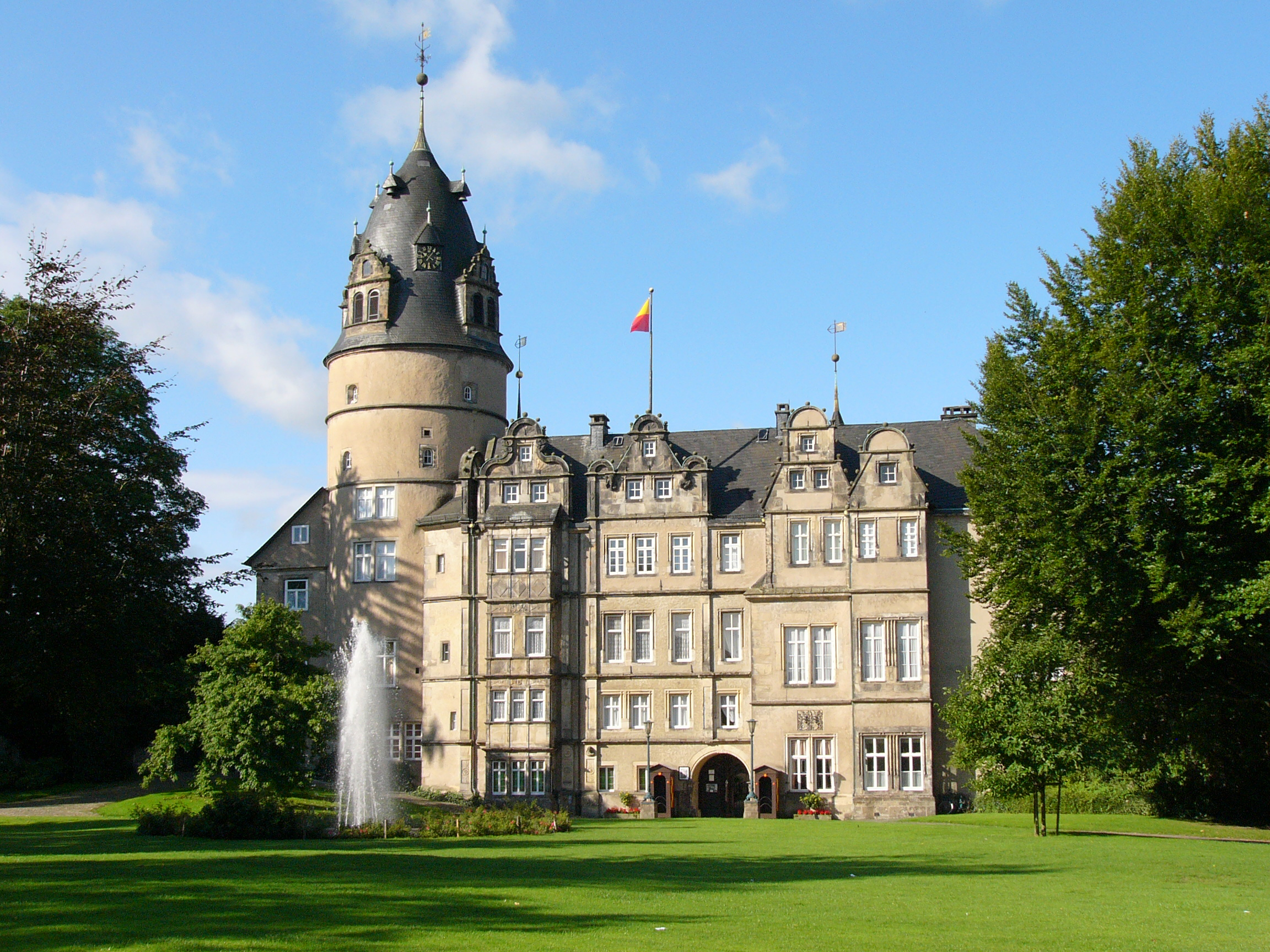
The princely castle at Detmold

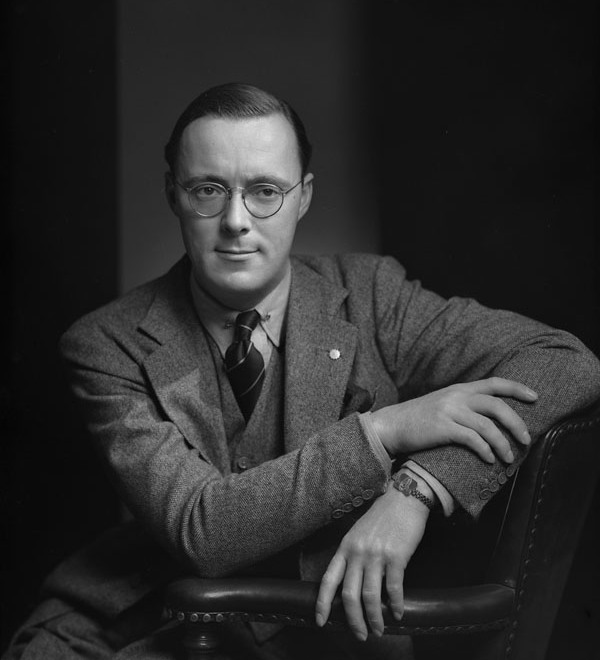
Prince Bernhard of Lippe-Biesterfeld in 1942

The House of Lippe (German: Haus Lippe) is the former reigning house of a number of small German states, two of which existed until the German Revolution of 1918–19, the Principality of Lippe and the Principality of Schaumburg-Lippe.

Princess Beatrix of the Netherlands, former Queen of the Netherlands (1980–2013), is an agnatic member of this house.

== History ==
The House of Lippe descends from Jodocus Herman, Lord of Lippe (died c. 1096), whose descendant Bernhard I was the founder of the state of Lippe in 1123. Born ca 1090. The family has produced several of the longest-reigning monarchs in Europe, including the longest reigning (for 82 years), Bernard VII, Lord of Lippe (d. 1511). In 1528, Simon V was elevated to the rank of ruling Count of the Holy Roman Empire and Edler Herr zur Lippe (noble Lord of Lippe).

In 1613, the House's territory was split into the counties of Lippe-Detmold, Lippe-Brake and Lippe-Alverdissen. In 1643, Count Philipp of Lippe-Alverdissen inherited half of the neighboring County of Schaumburg and founded the Schaumburg-Lippe line of the House of Lippe. The Brake branch extinguished in 1709, disputedly inherited by the main, Lippe-Detmold line. Alverdissen was bought back from Schaumburg-Lippe by Lippe-Detmold in 1812. In the 18th century, the cadet line of Lippe-Biesterfeld split from the Detmold branch, and shortly thereafter Lippe-Weissenfeld split from Lippe-Biesterfeld as a further cadet branch. Both, Biesterfeld and Weissenfeld were so-called paragiums (non-sovereign estates of a cadet-branch) within the County of Lippe. Both branches, owning only modest manor houses in the county, acquired other (non-sovereign) property by marriage and moved out of the county in the late 18th century, the Biesterfeld branch to the Rhineland, and the Weissenfeld branch to Saxony, where their inherited estates were mostly located.

The counts of Lippe-Detmold were granted the title of Imperial prince in 1789, while the counts of Schaumburg-Lippe became in fact princes by entering the Confederation of the Rhine in 1807 and legally by becoming a member state of the German Confederation in 1815.

The Principality of Lippe existed until the end of the German monarchies in 1918. In 1905, with the death of Alexander, Prince of Lippe, the senior Lippe-Detmold branch of the family became extinct and Count Leopold of Lippe-Biesterfeld (head of the non-ruling junior branch line Lippe-Biesterfeld) succeeded him as Prince, after an Imperial court ruling, in fact against the wishes of Wilhelm II, German Emperor, who would have preferred his brother-in-law Prince Adolf of Schaumburg-Lippe to succeed. Leopold IV continued to rule until the German Revolution of 1918. During the revolution, the ruling Princes of Lippe and Schaumburg-Lippe were forced to abdicate, ending the family's 795-year rule. In 1928, Prince Leopold's three sons by his first wife signed up to the Nazi Party. The eldest, Prince Ernst, was reputedly the first German prince to do so.

In 1937, Prince Bernhard of Lippe-Biesterfeld married Princess Juliana of the Netherlands. On the accession of their daughter Beatrix in 1980, the Netherlands Royal House officially remained known as the House of Orange-Nassau, although Beatrix and her sisters are agnatically members of the House of Lippe.

Stephan, Prince of Lippe (b. 1959) is the present senior of the House of Lippe. He still owns the estate and castle at Detmold, the former main residence of the principality. Alexander, Prince of Schaumburg-Lippe, head of the younger formerly sovereign branch, still resides at Bückeburg Palace, Lower Saxony, located on the border with North Rhine Westphalia.

== States ruled by the House of Lippe ==
- Lippe (1123–1918), known as Lippe-Detmold from 1621
- Lippe-Brake (1621–1709)
- Schaumburg-Lippe (1643–1918)

== Non-ruling cadet branches ==
- Lippe-Alverdissen (1613–1640 and 1681–1777)
- Lippe-Biesterfeld
- Lippe-Weissenfeld

== Rulers of Lippe ==
Partitions of Lippe under Lippe rule

County of Sternberg pledged by Holstein (1400)
County of Sternberg (1559-1583)	Lordship of Lippe (1123-1528); Raised to: County of Lippe (1528-1613)
County of Schauenburg (1613-1787); Lippe-Alverdissen line from 1777	County of Detmold (1613-1782)	County of Brake (1613-1709)
County of Biesterfeld (1627-1905)
County of Weissenfeld (1762-1916) Raised to: Principality of Weissenfeld (1916-1918)
County of Alverdissen (1681-1777)
County promoted to Principality of Schaumburg (1787-1918)	Raised to: Principality of Lippe (1782-1918); Lippe-Biesterfeld line from 1905

Table of rulers

Ruler	Born	Reign	Ruling part	Consort	Death	Notes
Bernard I	c.1090 First son of ?	1123 – 1158	Lordship of Lippe	Unknown at least one child	1158 aged 67-68	First recorded lord of Lippe, and possible founder of the family.
Herman I	c.1090 Second son of ?	1158 – 1167	Lordship of Lippe	Unknown at least two children	1167; Italy aged 76-77	
Bernard II	1140; Lippstadt; Son of Herman I	1167 – 1196	Lordship of Lippe	Heilwig of Are-Hochstaden eleven children	1224; Mežotne aged 83-84	Brother of the previous. Also Lord of Rheda. Abdicated to become an abbot at the Latvian monastery of Daugavgrīva. Eventually he was appointed Bishop at Sēlija in 1218.
Herman II	1175; Lippstadt; Son of Bernard II and Heilwig of Are-Hochstaden	1196 – 26 December 1229	Lordship of Lippe	Oda of Tecklenburg seven children	26 December 1229 aged 53-54	
Bernard III	1194; Lippstadt; Son of Herman II and Oda of Tecklenburg	26 December 1229 – 1265	Lordship of Lippe	Sophia of Cuijck-Arnsberg c.1230 five children Sophie of Ravensberg-Vechta (1220-1285); 1248 four children	1265 aged 70-71	
Bernard IV	c.1230 Bielefeld; First son of Bernard III and Sophia of Cuijck-Arnsberg	1265 – June 1275	Lordship of Lippe (at Horn)	Agnes of Clèves; 1260 two children	June 1275 aged 44-45	Sons of Bernard III, disputed the inheritance and briefly divided the lordship: Bernard kept Horn and the eastern part of the land; Herman received Lippstadt, Rheda and the western part.
Herman III	1233; Second son of Bernard III and Sophia of Cuijck-Arnsberg	1265 – 3 October 1274	Lordship of Lippe (at Lippstadt)	Unmarried	3 October 1274 aged 40-41	Sons of Bernard III, disputed the inheritance and briefly divided the lordship: Bernard kept Horn and the eastern part of the land; Herman received Lippstadt, Rheda and the western part.
Simon I	1261; Son of Bernard IV and Agnes of Clèves	June 1275 – 3 August 1344	Lordship of Lippe	Adelaide of Waldeck; 24 November 1276 eleven children	3 August 1344 aged 82-83	Reunited the lordship, but it would be once more divided between his children.
Simon II	c.1280 Fifth son of Simon I and Adelaide of Waldeck	1334	Lordship of Lippe	Unmarried	1334 aged 53-54	His situation is not very clear. Despite dying before his father, he is stated as co-ruling with his brothers below.
Bernard V	c.1290 Sixth son of Simon I and Adelaide of Waldeck	3 August 1344 – 1364	Lordship of Lippe (at Rheda)	Richardis of the Mark; 16 October 1344 four children	1364 aged 73-74	Sons of Simon I, after the death of their brother Simon not long after their father, the surviving brothers briefly divided the lordship: Bernard kept Rheda and Otto received Lemgo, Rheda
Otto	1300; Seventh son of Simon I and Adelaide of Waldeck	3 August 1344 – January 1360	Lordship of Lippe (at Lemgo)	Irmgard of the Mark (c.1300-1 August 1362); 4 March 1323 five children	January 1360 aged 59-60	Sons of Simon I, after the death of their brother Simon not long after their father, the surviving brothers briefly divided the lordship: Bernard kept Rheda and Otto received Lemgo, Rheda
Simon III	1340; Son of Otto and Irmgard of the Mark	January 1360 – 1410	Lordship of Lippe	Irmgard of Hoya; 1362 ten children	1410; Lemgo aged 69-70	Reunited the lands of Lippe once more.
Bernard VI	1363; Son of Simon III and Irmgard of Hoya	1410 – 19 January 1415	Lordship of Lippe	Margaret of Waldeck-Landau (1363-21 February 1395); 28 June 1393 no children Elisabeth of Mörs-Saarwerden; 11 May 1403 four children	19 January 1415; Detmold aged 51-52	
Simon IV	1404; Son of Bernard VI and Elisabeth of Mörs-Saarwerden	19 January 1415 – 11 August 1429	Lordship of Lippe	Margaret of Brunswick-Grubenhagen (1411-31 October 1456); 1426 five children	11 August 1429 aged 24-25	
Regencies of Otto of Lippe (1429-1433) and Dietrich II, Archbishop of Cologne (1433-1446)						Holds the record of the longest rule in history. Lord since he was less than one year old, he became known as having been involved in many feuds.
Bernard VII the Bellicose	4 December 1428; Son of Simon IV and Margaret of Brunswick-Grubenhagen	11 August 1429 – 2 April 1511	Lordship of Lippe	Anna of Holstein-Pinneberg (1428-23 September 1495); 15 September 1443 seven children	2 April 1511 aged 82	Holds the record of the longest rule in history. Lord since he was less than one year old, he became known as having been involved in many feuds.
Simon V	1471; Son of Bernard VII and Anna of Holstein-Pinneberg	2 April 1511 – 17 September 1536	Lordship of Lippe (until 1528) County of Lippe (from 1528)	Walpurgis of Bronckhorst (d.21 December 1522); 27 March 1490 one child Magdalena of Middle Mansfeld (c.1500-22 September 1540); 16 March 1524; Detmold four children	17 September 1536 aged 64-65	During his rule, the Lordship was elevated to a County.
Regency of Philip I, Landgrave of Hesse (1536-1547), Jobst II, Count of Hoya (1536-1545) and Adolphus XIII, Count of Holstein-Pinneberg (1536-1544)						Sons of Simon V, both were minors by the time their father died. Bernard kept Lippe and Herman Simon received the feudal land of Sternberg. Herman Simon would become regent of his nephew, Simon VI.
Bernard VIII	6 December 1527; Detmold; First son of Simon V and Magdalena of Middle Mansfeld	17 September 1536 – 15 April 1563	County of Lippe	Catherine of Waldeck-Eisenberg (1524-1583); 1550 five children	15 April 1563; Detmold aged 35	Sons of Simon V, both were minors by the time their father died. Bernard kept Lippe and Herman Simon received the feudal land of Sternberg. Herman Simon would become regent of his nephew, Simon VI.
Herman Simon	1532; Second son of Simon V and Magdalena of Middle Mansfeld	17 September 1536 – 4 June 1576	County of Sternberg	Ursula of Spiegelberg-Pyrmont (1526-16 March 1583); 18 May 1558; Pyrmont two children	4 June 1576 aged 43-44	Sons of Simon V, both were minors by the time their father died. Bernard kept Lippe and Herman Simon received the feudal land of Sternberg. Herman Simon would become regent of his nephew, Simon VI.
Regency of Herman Simon, Count of Lippe-Sternberg (1563-1576)						His marriage brought the county of Schaumburg (one of the last feuds of the counts of Holstein) into the family's domains. After Simon's death, the county entered into a more permanent division.
Simon VI	15 April 1554; Son of Bernard VIII and Catherine of Waldeck-Eisenberg	15 April 1563 – 7 December 1613	County of Lippe	Armgard, Countess of Rietberg; 1578 no children Elisabeth of Holstein-Pinneberg; 1585 ten children	7 December 1613 aged 59	His marriage brought the county of Schaumburg (one of the last feuds of the counts of Holstein) into the family's domains. After Simon's death, the county entered into a more permanent division.
Regency of Ursula of Spiegelberg-Pyrmont (1576-1578)						His early and childless death brought Sternberg once again under Lippe control.
Philip	5 October 1560; Son of Herman Simon and Ursula of Spiegelberg-Pyrmont	4 June 1576 – 11 February 1583	County of Sternberg	Unmarried	11 February 1583; Deutz aged 22	His early and childless death brought Sternberg once again under Lippe control.
Annexation to Lippe
Simon VII	30 December 1587; Lemgo; Second son of Simon VI and Elisabeth of Holstein-Pinneberg	7 December 1613 – 26 March 1627	County of Detmold	Anna Catharina of Nassau-Wiesbaden-Idstein; 6 May 1607; Brake twelve children Maria Magdalena of Waldeck-Wildungen; 27 April 1623 three children	26 March 1627; Detmold aged 39	Sons of Simon VI, divided their inheritance. Following the annexation of the county of Schauenburg after the extinction of the House of Schauenburg in 1640 (the Lippes were heirs through the mother of the last count), Philip joined this new county to his inheritance.
Otto	21 September 1589; Detmold; Third son of Simon VI and Elisabeth of Holstein-Pinneberg	7 December 1613 – 18 November 1657	County of Brake	Margaret of Nassau-Dillenburg; 30 October 1626; Dillenburg twelve children	18 November 1657; Blomberg aged 68	Sons of Simon VI, divided their inheritance. Following the annexation of the county of Schauenburg after the extinction of the House of Schauenburg in 1640 (the Lippes were heirs through the mother of the last count), Philip joined this new county to his inheritance.
Herman	22 December 1590; Detmold; Fourth son of Simon VI and Elisabeth of Holstein-Pinneberg	7 December 1613 – 23 August 1620	County of Schwalenberg	Unmarried	23 August 1620; Detmold aged 29	Sons of Simon VI, divided their inheritance. Following the annexation of the county of Schauenburg after the extinction of the House of Schauenburg in 1640 (the Lippes were heirs through the mother of the last count), Philip joined this new county to his inheritance.
Philip I	18 July 1601; Lemgo; Fifth son of Simon VI and Elisabeth of Holstein-Pinneberg	7 December 1613 – 10 April 1681	County of Alverdissen (until 1640) County of Schaumburg (from 1640)	Sophie of Hesse-Kassel; 13 October 1644; Stadthagen ten children	10 April 1681; Stadthagen aged 79	Sons of Simon VI, divided their inheritance. Following the annexation of the county of Schauenburg after the extinction of the House of Schauenburg in 1640 (the Lippes were heirs through the mother of the last count), Philip joined this new county to his inheritance.
Schwalenberg re-absorbed in Detmold
Regency of Christian, Count of Waldeck-Pyrmont (1627-1631)						Children of Simon VII, and both minors, divided the inheritance.
Simon Louis	14 March 1610; Lemgo; First son of Simon VII and Anna Catharina of Nassau-Wiesbaden-Idstein	26 March 1627 – 8 August 1636	County of Detmold	Catherine of Waldeck-Wildungen; 19 June 1631; Wildungen three children	8 August 1636 aged 26	Children of Simon VII, and both minors, divided the inheritance.
Regency of Maria Magdalena of Waldeck-Pyrmont (1627-1654)						Children of Simon VII, and both minors, divided the inheritance.
Jobst Herman	9 February 1625; Detmold; Son of Simon VII and Maria Magdalena of Waldeck-Wildungen	26 March 1627 – 6 July 1678	Lordship of Biesterfeld (at Schwalenberg until 1654; at Biesterfeld since 1654)	Juliane Elisabeth of Sayn-Wittgenstein; 10 October 1654; Wittgenstein twenty children	6 July 1678; Biesterfeld aged 52	Children of Simon VII, and both minors, divided the inheritance.
Regencies of Christian, Count of Waldeck-Pyrmont (1636-1637) and Catherine of Waldeck-Wildungen (1637-1650)						Died with no descendants. The county fell to his uncle.
Simon Philip	6 April 1632; Lemgo; Son of Simon Louis and Catherine of Waldeck-Wildungen	8 August 1636 – 19 June 1650	County of Detmold	Unmarried	19 June 1650; Detmold aged 18	Died with no descendants. The county fell to his uncle.
John Bernard	18 October 1613; Brake; Second son of Simon VII and Anna Catharina of Nassau-Wiesbaden-Idstein	19 June 1650 – 10 June 1652	County of Detmold	Unmarried	10 June 1652; Detmold aged 38	Also had no descendants.
Herman Adolphus	31 January 1616; Detmold; Third son of Simon VII and Anna Catharina of Nassau-Wiesbaden-Idstein	10 June 1652 – 10 October 1666	County of Detmold	Ernestina of Isenburg-Offenbach; 1648 four children Amalia of Lippe-Brake; 27 February 1666 no children	10 October 1666; Detmold aged 50	
Casimir	22 July 1627; Lemgo; Son of Otto and Margaret of Nassau-Dillenburg	18 November 1657 – 1692	County of Brake	Anna Amalia of Sayn-Homburg; 28 May 1663; Nymbrecht nine children	12 March 1700; Lemgo aged 72	In 1692, he abdicated to his eldest son.
Simon Henry	13 March 1649; Sternberg; Son of Herman Adolphus and Ernestina of Isenburg-Offenbach	20 October 1666 – 2 May 1697	County of Detmold	Amalia of Dohna-Vianen (2 February 1644 - 11 March 1700); 15 December 1666; The Hague sixteen children	2 May 1697; Detmold aged 48	
Regency of Juliane Elisabeth of Sayn-Wittgenstein (1678-1689)						
Rudolph Ferdinand	17 March 1671; Lemgo; Son of Jobst Herman and Juliane Elisabeth of Sayn-Wittgenstein	6 July 1678 – 12 July 1736	Lordship of Biesterfeld	Juliana Louisa von Kunowitz (21 August 1671 - 21 October 1741); 22 February 1705; Halle eight children	12 July 1736; Biesterfeld aged 65	
Frederick Christian	16 August 1655; Bückeburg; Second son of Philip I and Sophie of Hesse-Kassel	10 April 1681 – 13 June 1728	County of Schaumburg	Joanna Sophia of Hohenlohe-Langenburg; 4 January 1691; Langenburg (annulled 1723) six children	13 June 1728; Bückeburg aged 72	Sons of Philip I, divided their inheritance: Frederick Christian kept Schaumburg, and Philip Ernest received Alverdissen (the land of his father prior to the inheritance of the County of Schaumburg).
Philip Ernest I	20 December 1659; Bückeburg; Fourth son of Philip I and Sophie of Hesse-Kassel	10 April 1681 – 27 November 1723	County of Alverdissen	Dorothea Amalia of Schleswig-Holstein-Sonderburg-Beck; 31 December 1686; Beck seven children	27 November 1723; Alverdissen aged 63	Sons of Philip I, divided their inheritance: Frederick Christian kept Schaumburg, and Philip Ernest received Alverdissen (the land of his father prior to the inheritance of the County of Schaumburg).
Rudolph	10 May 1664; Lemgo; Son of Casimir and Anna Amalia of Sayn-Homburg	1692 – 27 October 1707	County of Brake	Dorothea Elisabeth of Waldeck-Wildungen (6 July 1661 - 23 July 1702); 4 November 1691; Kleinern one child	27 October 1707; Lemgo aged 43	Left no surviving descendants. The county passed to his cousin.
Frederick Adolphus	2 September 1667; Detmold; Son of Simon Henry and Amalia of Dohna-Vianen	2 May 1697 – 18 July 1718	County of Detmold	Joanna Elizabeth of Nassau-Schaumburg (5 September 1663 - 8 February 1700); 16 June 1692; Schaumburg six children Amalia of Solms-Hohensolms; 8 June 1700; Hohensolms seven children	18 July 1718; Detmold aged 50	
Louis Ferdinand	27 September 1680; Halberstadt; Son of Frederick of Lippe-Brake and Sophia Louise of Schleswig-Holstein-Sonderburg-Beck	27 October 1707 – 21 February 1709	County of Brake	Unmarried	21 February 1709; Wolfenbüttel aged 28	Son of Frederick, a younger brother of Casimir. After his childless death Brake reverted to Lippe.
Annexation to Detmold
Simon Henry Adolphus	25 January 1694; Detmold; Son of Frederick Adolphus and Joanna Elizabeth of Nassau-Schaumburg	18 July 1718 – 12 October 1734	County of Detmold	Johanetta Wilhelmina of Nassau-Idstein; 16 October 1719; Wiesbaden eleven children	12 October 1734; Detmold aged 40	
Frederick Ernest	20 December 1694; Alverdissen; Son of Philip Ernest I and Dorothea Amalia of Schleswig-Holstein-Sonderburg-Beck	27 November 1723 – 28 August 1749	County of Alverdissen	Elisabeth Philippine von Friesenhausen (19 August 1696 - 4 August 1764); 27 September 1722; Rebourg eleven children	28 August 1749; Bruchhof aged 44	
Albert Wolfgang	27 April 1699; Bückeburg; Son of Frederick Christian and Joanna Sophia of Hohenlohe-Langenburg	13 June 1728 – 24 September 1748	County of Schaumburg	Margarete Gertrud of Oeynhausen (9 April 1698 - 8 April 1726); 30 October 1721; London two children Charlotte Frederica of Nassau-Siegen (30 November 1702 - 22 July 1785); 26 April 1730; Varel no children	24 September 1748; Bückeburg aged 49	
Regency of Johanetta Wilhelmina of Nassau-Idstein (1734-1747)						
Simon Augustus	12 June 1727; Detmold; Son of Simon Henry Adolphus and Johanetta Wilhelmina of Nassau-Idstein	12 October 1734 – 1 May 1782	County of Detmold	Polyxena Louise of Nassau-Weilburg (27 January 1733 - 27 September 1764); 24 August 1750; Kirchheimbolanden one child Maria Leopoldine of Anhalt-Dessau; 28 September 1765; Dessau one child Casimire of Anhalt-Dessau; 9 November 1769; Dessau one child Christine of Solms-Braunfels (30 August 1744 - 16 December 1823); 26 March 1780; Braunfels no children	1 May 1782; Detmold aged 54	
Frederick Charles Augustus	20 January 1706; Biesterfeld; First son of Rudolph Ferdinand and Juliana Louisa von Kunowitz	12 July 1736 – 31 July 1781	Lordship of Biesterfeld (until 1762) County of Biesterfeld (from 1762)	Barbara Eleonora of Solms-Baruth; 7 May 1732; Baruth eight children	31 July 1781; Friedrichsruh aged 75	Sons of Rudolph Ferdinand. Frederick Charles ascended after his father's death, and, during his rule, the Lordship was elevated to a County. In this same year (1762), he gave Weissenfelf to his brother Ferdinand Louis.
Ferdinand I Louis	22 August 1709; Biesterfeld; Second son of Rudolph Ferdinand and Juliana Louisa von Kunowitz	1762 – 18 January 1787	County of Weissenfeld	Ernestine Henriette of Solms-Baruth; 2 November 1736; Baruth nine children	18 January 1787; Calau aged 77	Sons of Rudolph Ferdinand. Frederick Charles ascended after his father's death, and, during his rule, the Lordship was elevated to a County. In this same year (1762), he gave Weissenfelf to his brother Ferdinand Louis.
William	9 January 1724; London; Son of Albert Wolfgang and Margarete Gertrud of Oeynhausen	24 September 1748 – 10 September 1777	County of Schaumburg	Maria Barbara Eleonore of Lippe-Biesterfeld; 12 November 1765; Stadthagen two children	10 September 1777; Wölpinghausen aged 53	Left no surviving descendants. The county passed to his cousin from the Alverdissen line.
Philip Ernest II	5 July 1720; Rinteln; Son of Frederick Ernest and Elisabeth Philippine von Friesenhausen	28 August 1749 – 10 September 1777	County of Alverdissen	Ernestine Albertine of Saxe-Weimar; 6 May 1756; Weimar four children Juliane of Hesse-Philippsthal; 10 October 1780; Philippsthal four children	13 February 1787; Bückeburg aged 66	After the death of the last male representative of the Schaumburg-Lippe line, he assumed the reins of this County, probably even merging his own with the recently acquired property.
Philip Ernest II	5 July 1720; Rinteln; Son of Frederick Ernest and Elisabeth Philippine von Friesenhausen	10 September 1777 – 13 February 1787	County of Schaumburg	Ernestine Albertine of Saxe-Weimar; 6 May 1756; Weimar four children Juliane of Hesse-Philippsthal; 10 October 1780; Philippsthal four children	13 February 1787; Bückeburg aged 66	After the death of the last male representative of the Schaumburg-Lippe line, he assumed the reins of this County, probably even merging his own with the recently acquired property.
Annexation to Schaumburg
Charles Ernest Casimir	2 November 1735; Biesterfeld; Son of Frederick Charles Augustus and Barbara Eleonora of Solms-Baruth	31 July 1781 – 19 November 1810	County of Biesterfeld	Ferdinanda Henrietta Dorothea of Bentheim-Tecklenburg (24 August 1737 - 23 April 1779); 16 October 1769; Rheda five childre	19 November 1810; Marburg aged 75	
Regency of Louis Henry Adolph of Lippe-Detmold (1782-1789)						During his rule, the County was elevated to a Principality.
Leopold I	2 December 1767; Detmold; Son of Simon Augustus and Maria Leopoldine of Anhalt-Dessau	1 May 1782 – 4 April 1802	County of Detmold (until 1789) Principality of Lippe (from 1789)	Pauline Christine of Anhalt-Bernburg; 2 January 1796; Ballenstedt two children	4 April 1802; Detmold aged 34	During his rule, the County was elevated to a Principality.
Frederick John Louis	2 September 1737; Weissenfeld; Son of Ferdinand I Louis and Ernestine Henriette of Solms-Baruth	18 January 1787 – 14 May 1791	County of Weissenfeld	Maria Eleonora von Gersdorf (1 September 1752 - 3 December 1772); 21 February 1772; Milkel one child Wilhelmina von Hoenthal (19 February 1748 - 8 December 1789); 28 August 1775; Debernitz five children	14 May 1791; Calau aged 53	
Regency of Juliane of Hesse-Philippsthal (1787-1820)						During his rule, the County was elevated to a Principality.
George William	20 December 1784; Bückeburg; Son of Philip II Ernest II and Juliane of Hesse-Philippsthal	13 February 1787 – 21 November 1860	County of Schaumburg (until 1807) Principality of Schaumburg (from 1807)	Ida of Waldeck-Pyrmont; 23 June 1816; Arolsen nine children	21 November 1860; Bückeburg aged 76	During his rule, the County was elevated to a Principality.
Ferdinand II	20 November 1772; Weissenfeld; Son of Frederick John Louis and Maria Eleonora von Gersdorf	14 May 1791 – 21 June 1846	County of Weissenfeld	Eleonora Gustava von Thermo (19 October 1789 - 23 February 1868); 23 November 1804; Lipten seven children	21 June 1846; Calau aged 73	
Regency of Pauline Christine of Anhalt-Bernburg (1802-1820)						
Leopold II	6 November 1796; Detmold; Son of Leopold I and Pauline Christine of Anhalt-Bernburg	4 April 1802 – 1 January 1851	Principality of Lippe	Emilia Frederica of Schwarzburg-Sondershausen (23 April 1800 - 2 April 1867); 23 April 1820; Arnstadt nine children	1 January 1851; Detmold aged 54	
William Ernest	15 April 1777; Hohenlimburg Castle; Son of Charles Ernest Casimir and Ferdinanda Henrietta Dorothea of Bentheim-Tecklenburg	19 November 1810 – 8 January 1840	County of Biesterfeld	Dorothea Christina Modesta von Umru (29 April 1781 - 29 September 1854); 26 July 1803; Bayreuth nine children	8 January 1840; Oberkassel aged 62	
Julius	2 April 1812; Oberkassel; Son of William Ernest and Dorothea Christina Modesta von Umru	8 January 1840 – 17 May 1884	County of Biesterfeld	Adelaide Clotilda Augusta of Kastell-Kastell (18 June 1818 - 11 July 1900); 30 April 1839; Kastell fourteen children	17 May 1884; Baden-Baden aged 72	
Gustav	21 August 1805; Milkel; Son of Ferdinand II and Eleonora Gustava von Thermo	21 June 1846 – 17 June 1882	County of Weissenfeld	Ida of Lippe-Weissenfeld (16 January 1819 - 18 March 1878); 21 August 1848; Niedergurig seven children	17 June 1882; Baruth aged 76	
Leopold III	1 September 1821; Detmold; First son of Leopold II and Emilia Frederica of Schwarzburg-Sondershausen	1 January 1851 – 8 December 1875	Principality of Lippe	Elisabeth of Schwarzburg-Rudolstadt (1 October 1833 - 27 November 1896); 17 April 1852; Rudolstadt no children	8 December 1875; Detmold aged 54	Left no descendants. The principality fell to his brother.
Adolphus I	1 August 1817; Bückeburg; Son of George William and Ida of Waldeck-Pyrmont	21 November 1860 – 8 May 1893	Principality of Schaumburg	Hermine of Waldeck-Pyrmont; 25 October 1844; Arolsen three children	8 May 1893; Bückeburg aged 75	
Woldemar	18 April 1824; Detmold; Second son of Leopold II and Emilia Frederica of Schwarzburg-Sondershausen	8 December 1875 – 20 March 1895	Principality of Lippe	Sophie of Baden; 9 November 1858; Karlsruhe no children	20 March 1895; Detmold aged 70	Left no descendants. The principality fell to his brother.
Ferdinand III	6 October 1844; Baruth; Son of Gustav and Ida of Lippe-Weissenfeld	17 June 1882 – 11 April 1900	County of Weissenfeld	Margarete von Winterfeld (17 September 1858 - 11 July 1903) no children	11 April 1900; Baruth aged 55	Left no children. The county passed to his cousin, Clemens.
Ernest	9 June 1842; Oberkassel; Son of Julius and Adelaide Clotilda Augusta of Kastell-Kastell	17 May 1884 – 26 September 1904	County of Biesterfeld	Karoline of Wartensleben; 16 September 1869; Neudorf six children	26 September 1904; Jagdschloss Lopshorn aged 62	Held regency to the Principality of Lippe due to the mental illness of his relative and actual prince, Alexander.
George	10 October 1846; Bückeburg; Son of Adolphus I and Hermine of Waldeck-Pyrmont	8 May 1893 – 29 April 1911	Principality of Schaumburg	Marie Anne of Saxe-Altenburg; 16 April 1882; Altenburg nine children	29 April 1911; Bückeburg aged 64	
Regencies of Ernest, Count of Lippe-Biesterfeld (1895-1904) and Leopold, Count of Lippe-Biesterfeld (1904-1905)						Had a mental illness, so he never fully assumed he reins of the principality, which was assumed by his cousin from the Lippe-Biesterfeld line. After his death, his regent became the new prince.
Alexander	16 January 1831; Detmold; Fifth son of Leopold II and Emilia Frederica of Schwarzburg-Sondershausen	20 March 1895 – 13 January 1905	Principality of Lippe	Unmarried	13 January 1905; Detmold aged 73	Had a mental illness, so he never fully assumed he reins of the principality, which was assumed by his cousin from the Lippe-Biesterfeld line. After his death, his regent became the new prince.
Clemens	15 July 1860; Dresden; Son of Francis of Lippe-Weissenfeld and Marie Sophie Freiin of Beschwitz	11 April 1900 – 12 November 1918	County of Weissenfeld (until 1916) Principality of Weissenfeld (from 1916)	Friederike von Carlowitz; 7 January 1901; Proschwitz two children	29 April 1920; Proschwitz aged 59	Grandson of Christian, a brother of Ferdinand II. In 1918, he abdicated following the dissolution of the monarchy.
Leopold IV	30 May 1871; Oberkassel; Son of Ernest and Karoline of Wartensleben	26 September 1904 – 13 January 1905	County of Biesterfeld	Bertha of Hesse-Philippsthal-Barchfeld (25 October 1874 - 19 February 1919); 16 August 1901; Rotenburg five children Anna of Ysenburg and Büdingen; 16 April 1922; Büdingen one child	30 December 1949; Detmold aged 78	From the Lippe-Biesterfeld line. After the death of the last male representative of the Lippe-Detmold line, he assumed the reins of the Principality of Lippe, probably even merging his own county with the recently acquired principality. In 1918, he abdicated following the dissolution of the monarchy. In addition to being pro Nazis, both his eldest sons (Ernst and Chlodwig) had contracted unequal marriages. So in 1947, when Leopold wrote his will, Armin, his youngest son and only child with his second wife, would succeed him as head of the House of Lippe. One of Leopold's nephews, Bernhard, became the consort of Queen Juliana of the Netherlands.
Leopold IV	30 May 1871; Oberkassel; Son of Ernest and Karoline of Wartensleben	13 January 1905 – 12 November 1918	Principality of Lippe	Bertha of Hesse-Philippsthal-Barchfeld (25 October 1874 - 19 February 1919); 16 August 1901; Rotenburg five children Anna of Ysenburg and Büdingen; 16 April 1922; Büdingen one child	30 December 1949; Detmold aged 78	
Annexation to Lippe
Adolphus II	23 February 1883; Stadthagen; Son of George and Marie Anne of Saxe-Altenburg	29 April 1911 – 12 November 1918	Principality of Schaumburg	Ellen Bischoff-Korthaus (6 November 1894 - 26 March 1936); 10 January 1920; Berlin no children	26 March 1936; Zumpango aged 53	In 1918, he abdicated following the dissolution of the monarchy. Died in a plane crash.

== See also ==
- List of consorts of Lippe

== Castles of the House of Lippe ==
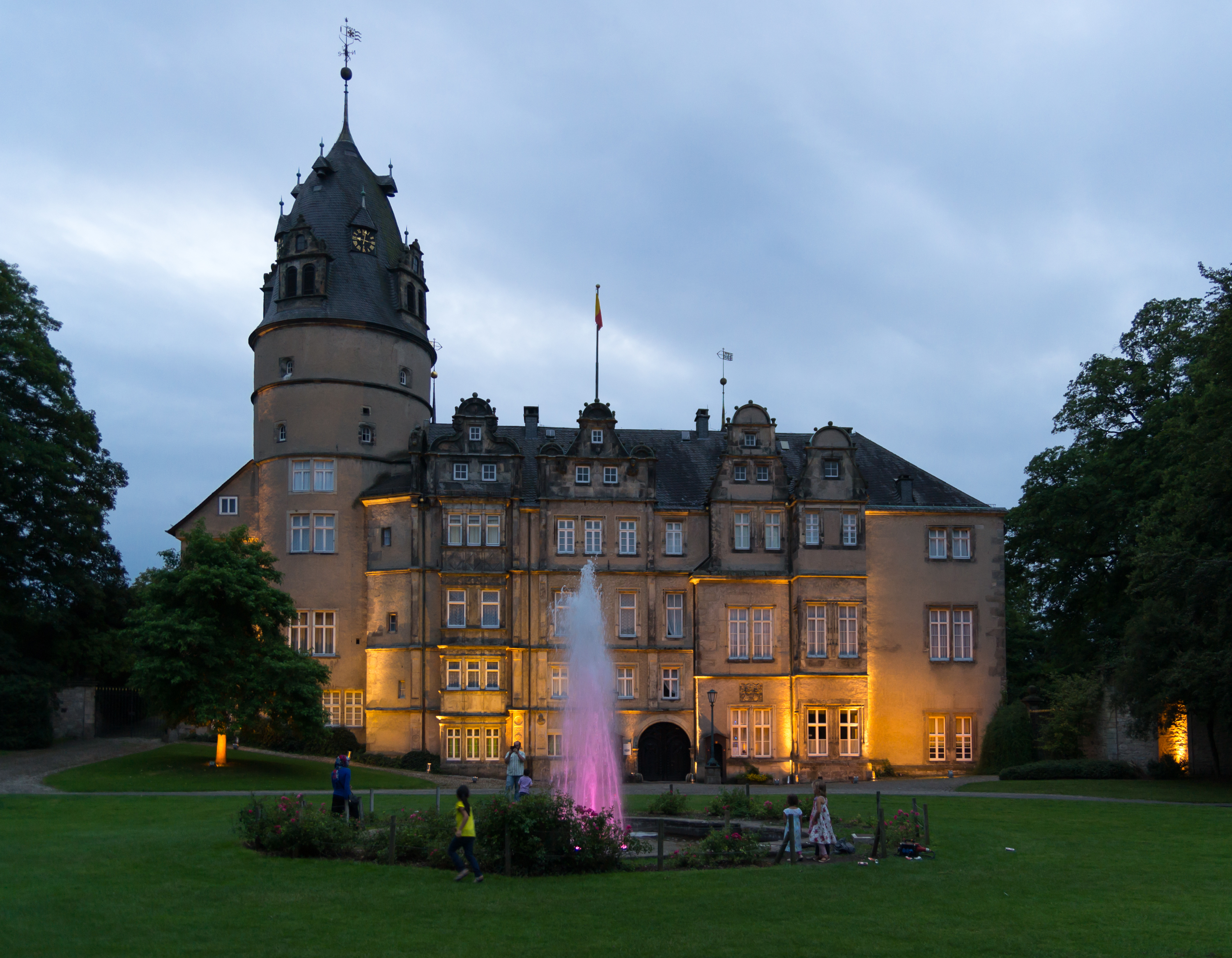
Detmold Castle

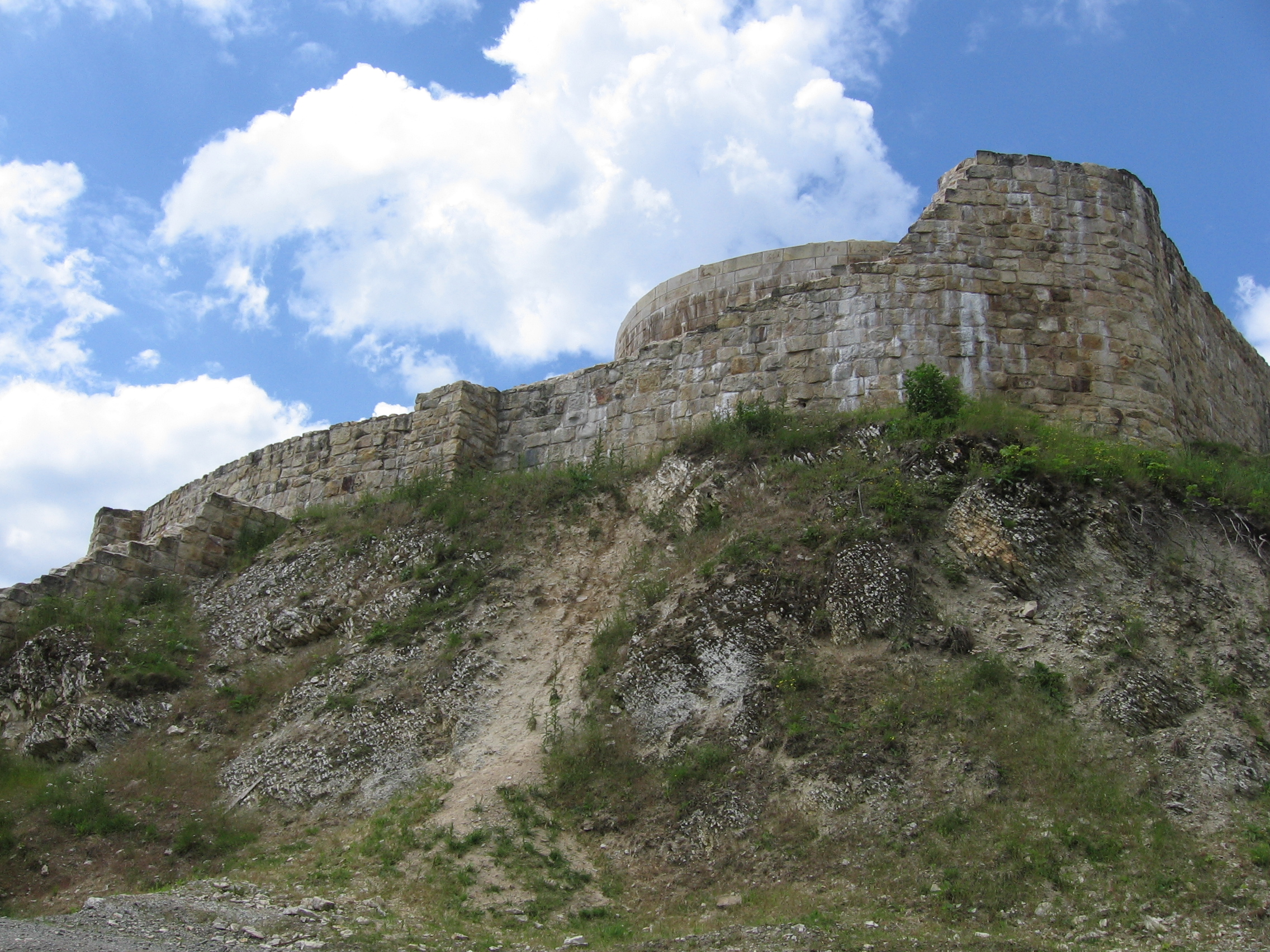
Falkenburg Castle, Detmold

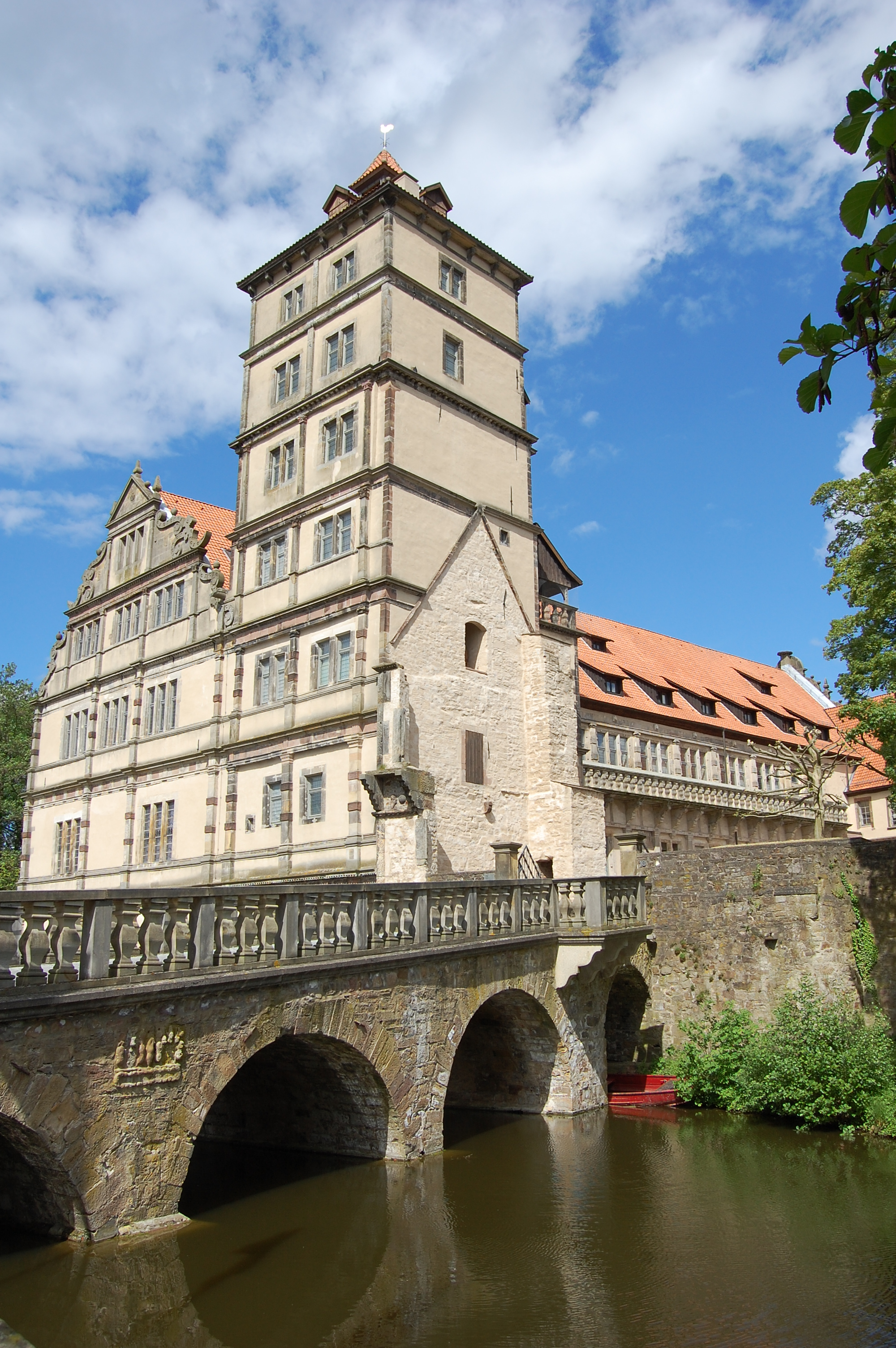
Brake Castle, Lemgo

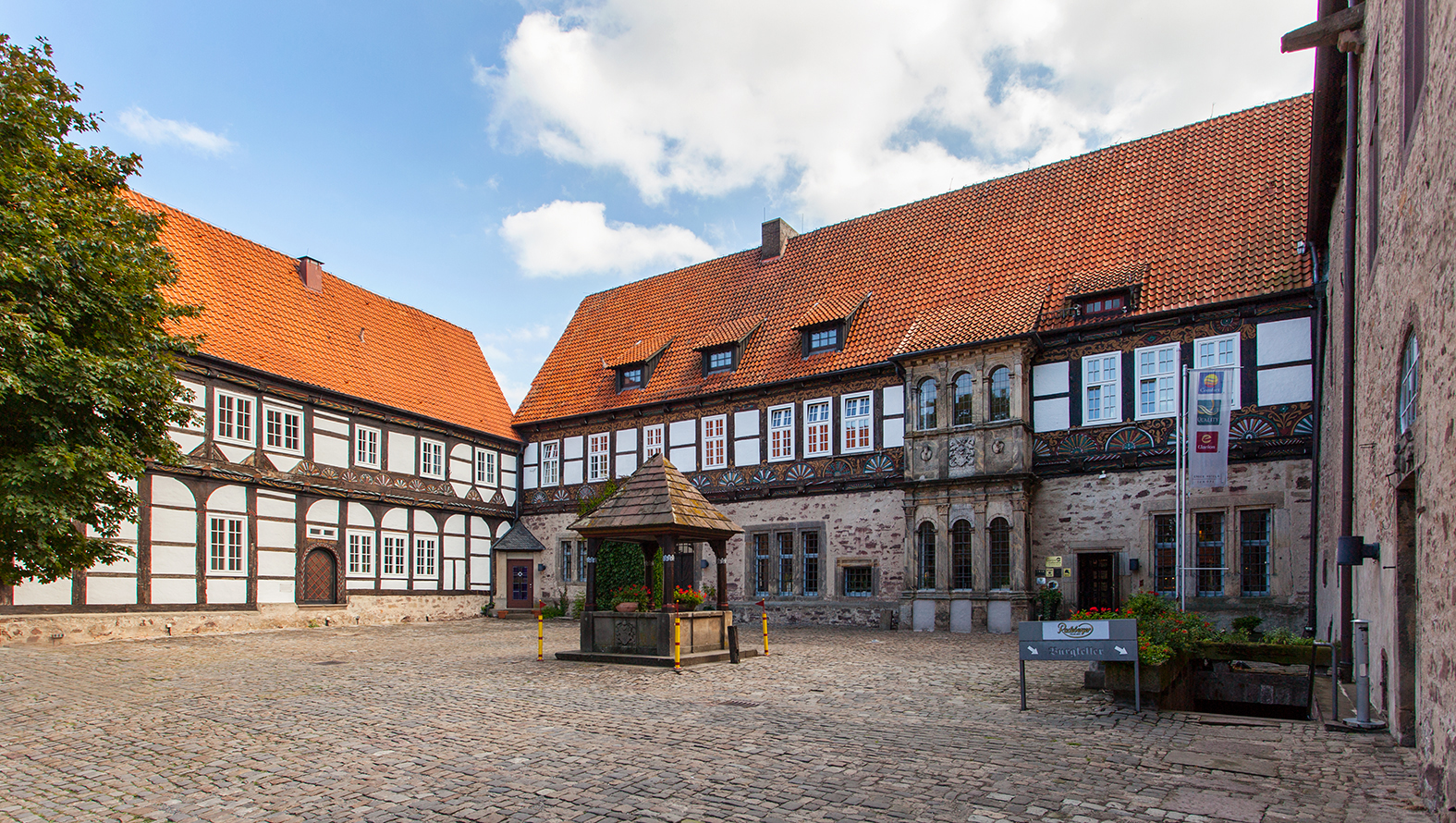
Blomberg Castle

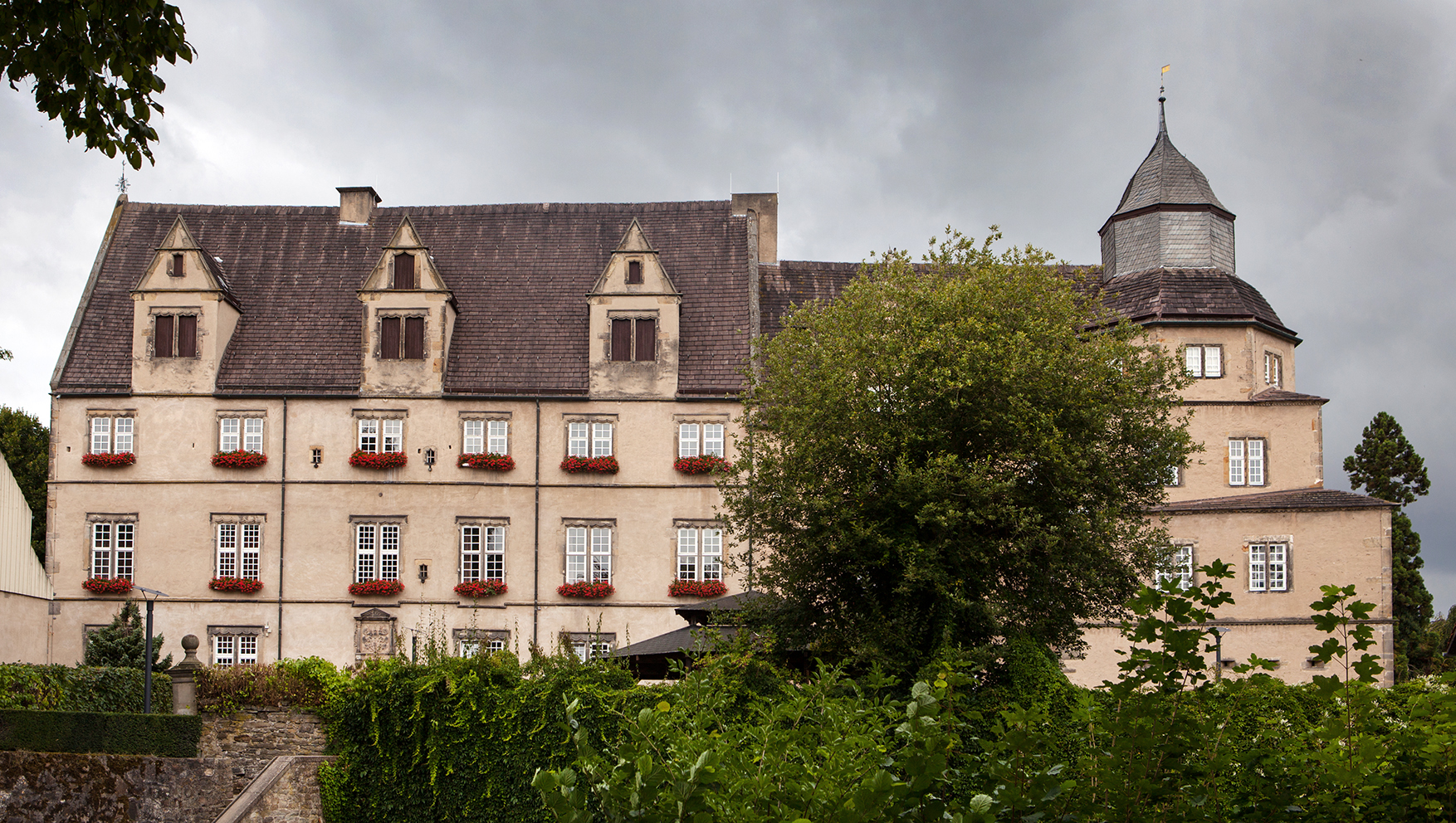
Varenholz Castle, Kalletal

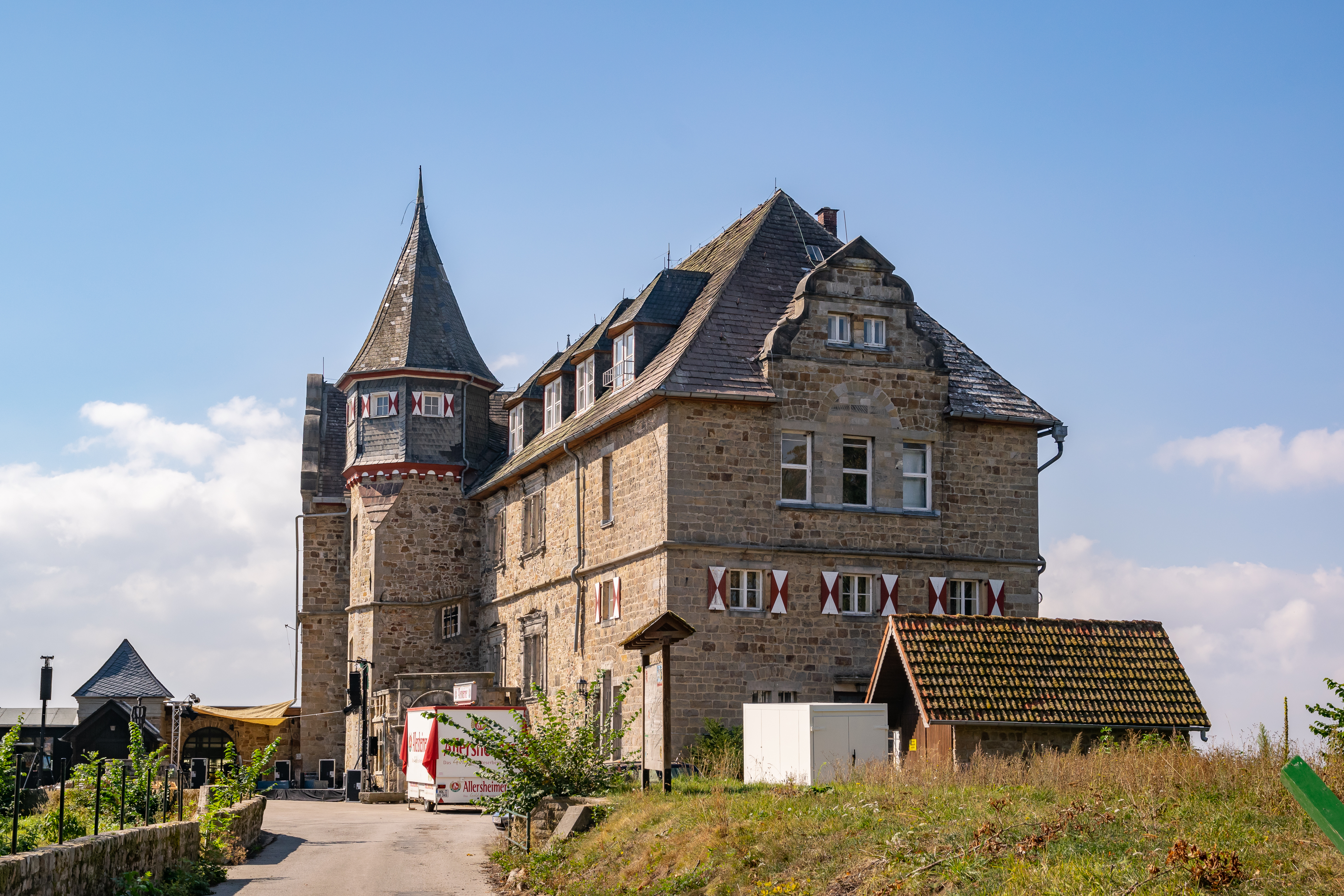
Schwalenberg Castle

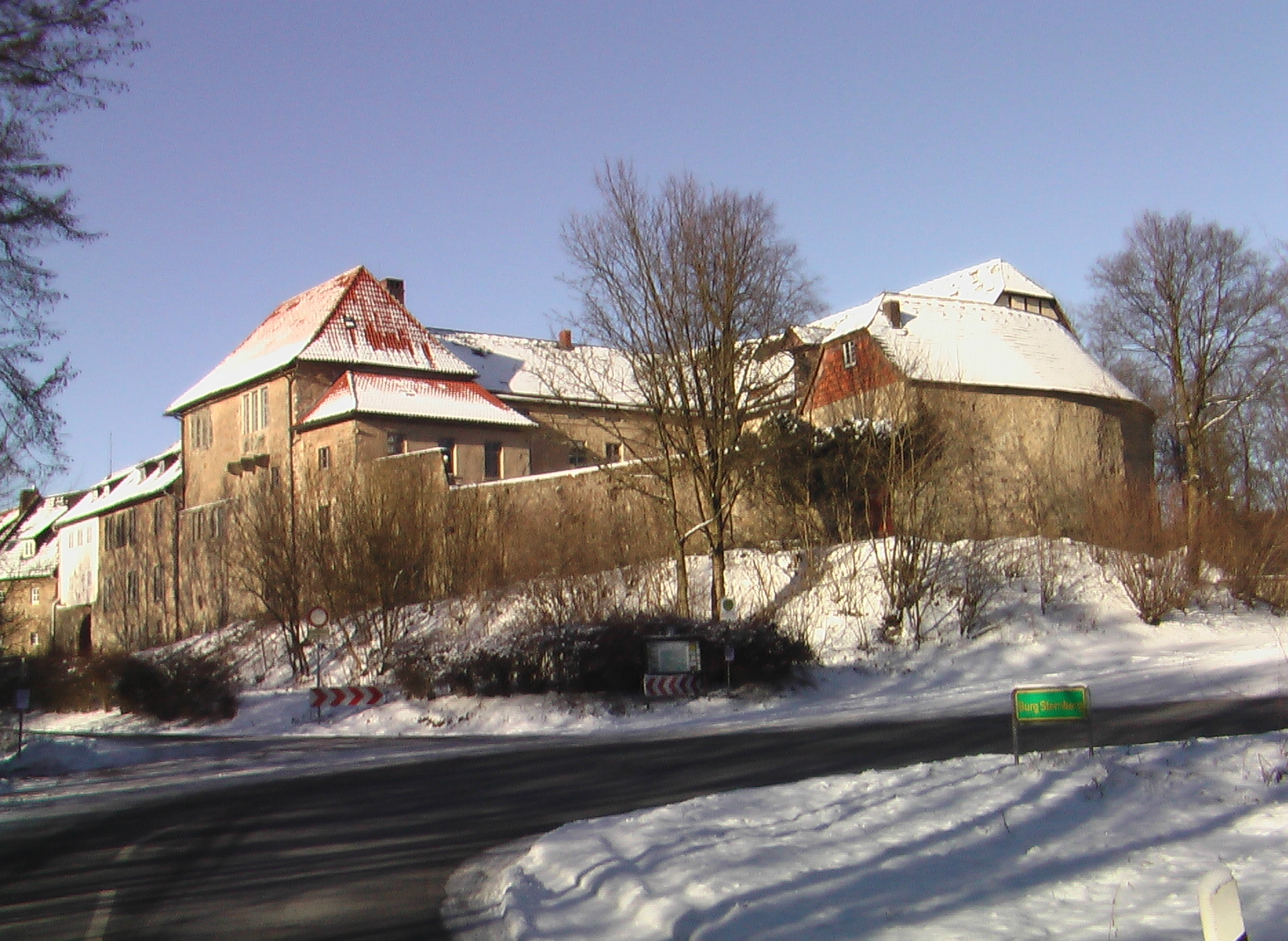
Sternberg Castle, Extertal

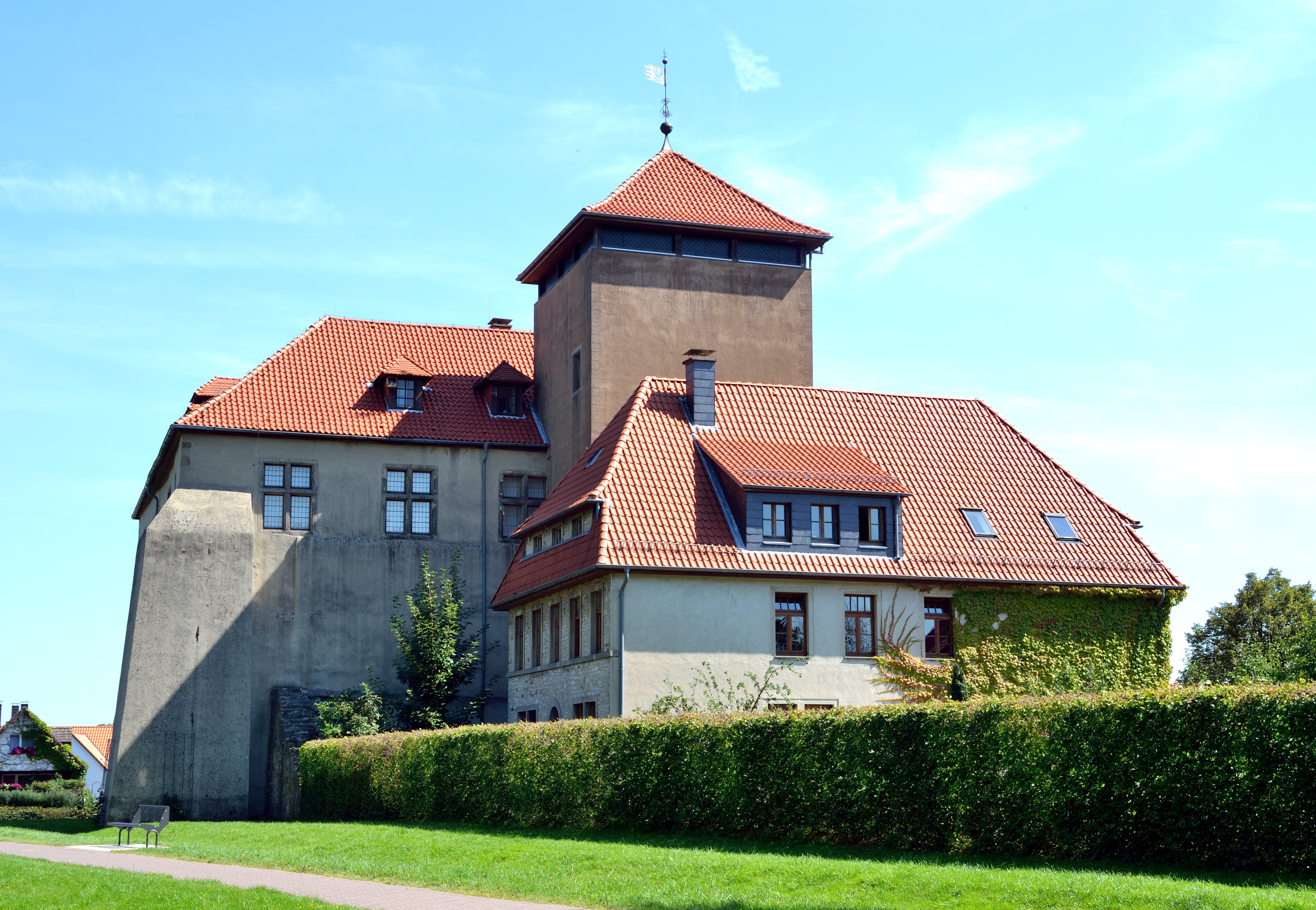
Horn Castle

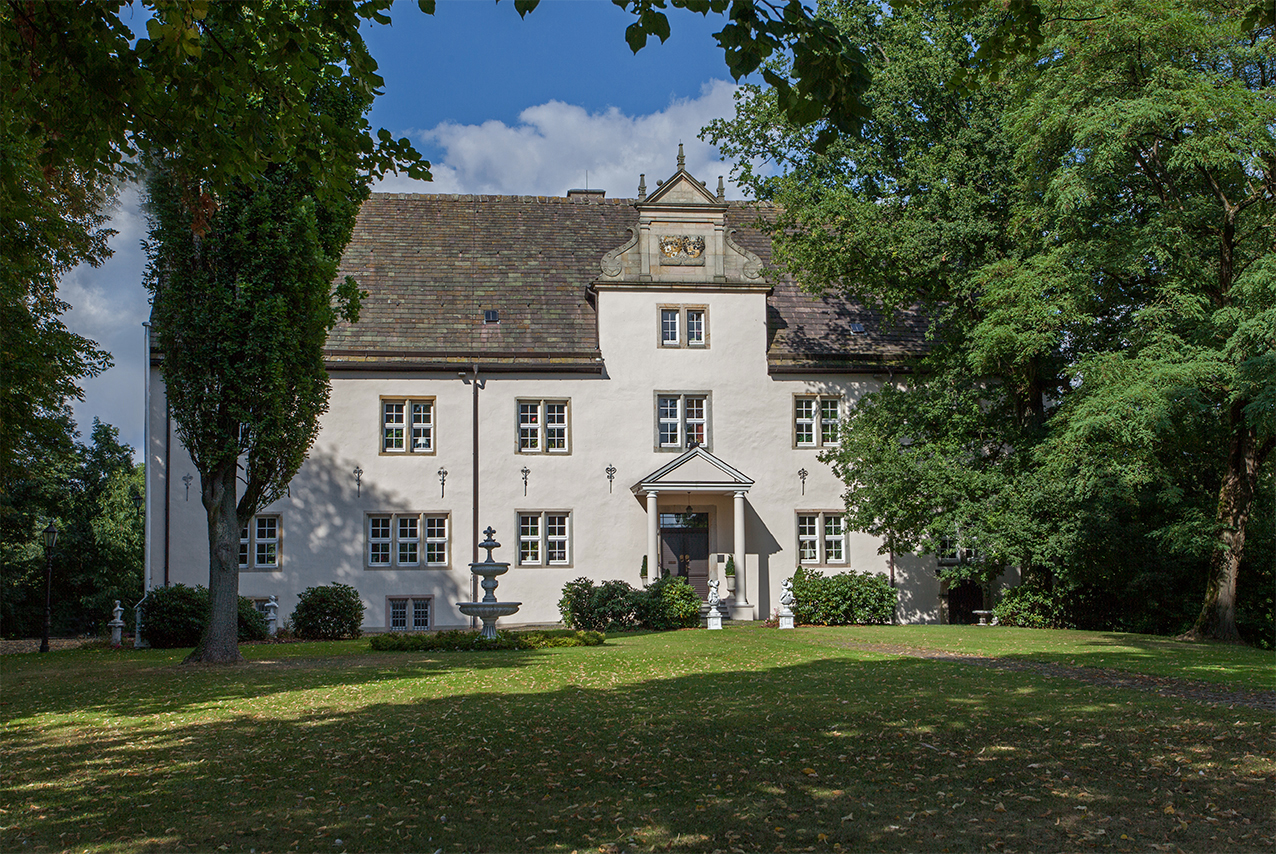
Alverdissen Castle, Barntrup

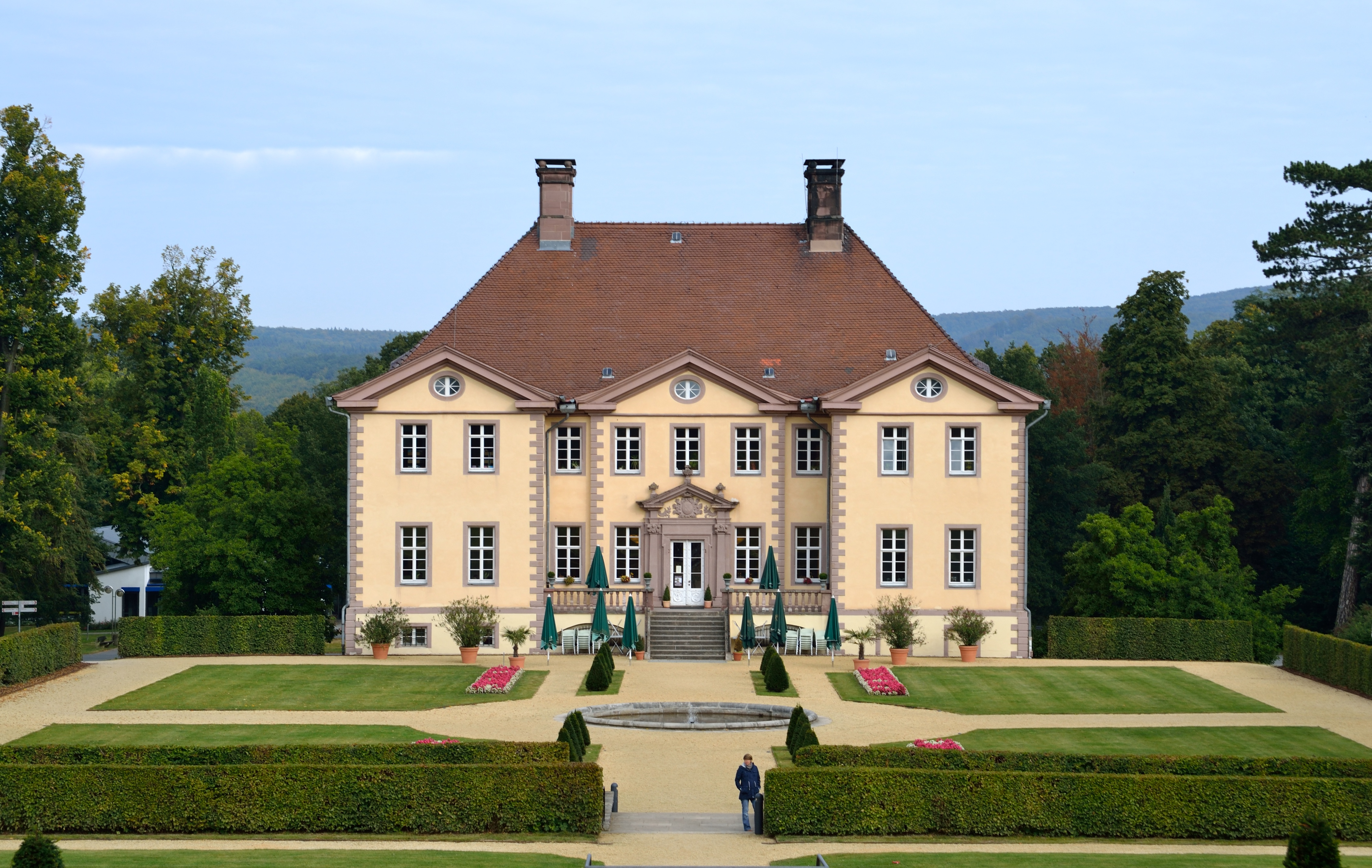
Schieder House, Schieder-Schwalenberg

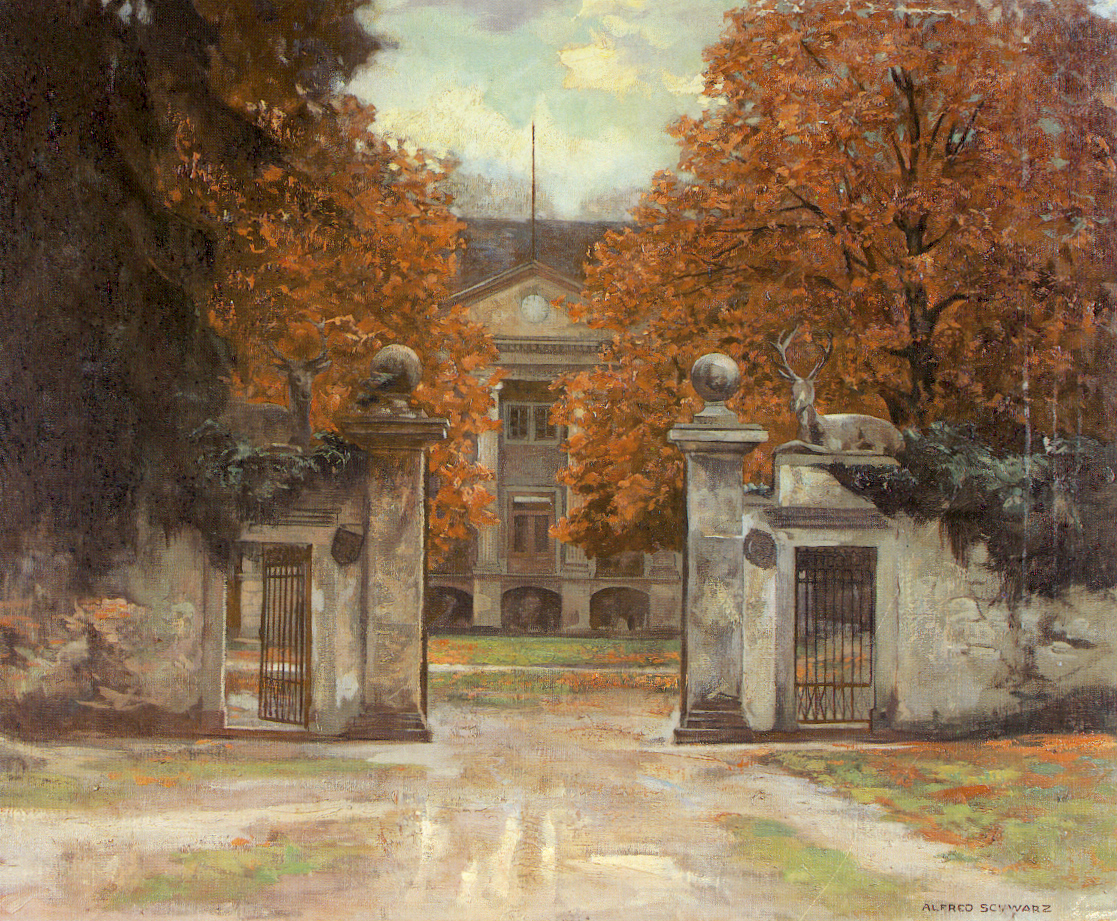
Lopshorn hunting castle, Augustdorf

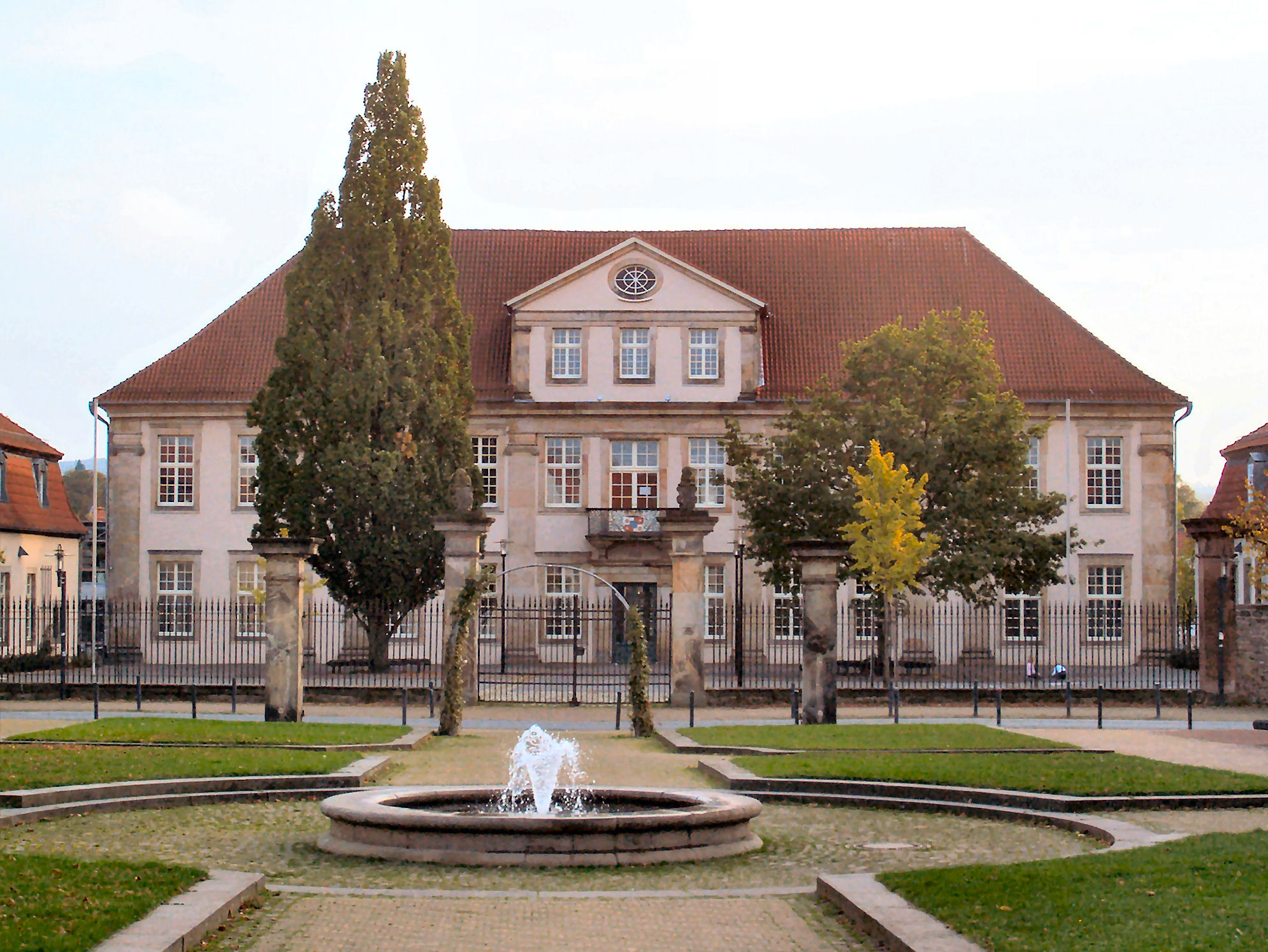
Lippehof in Lemgo

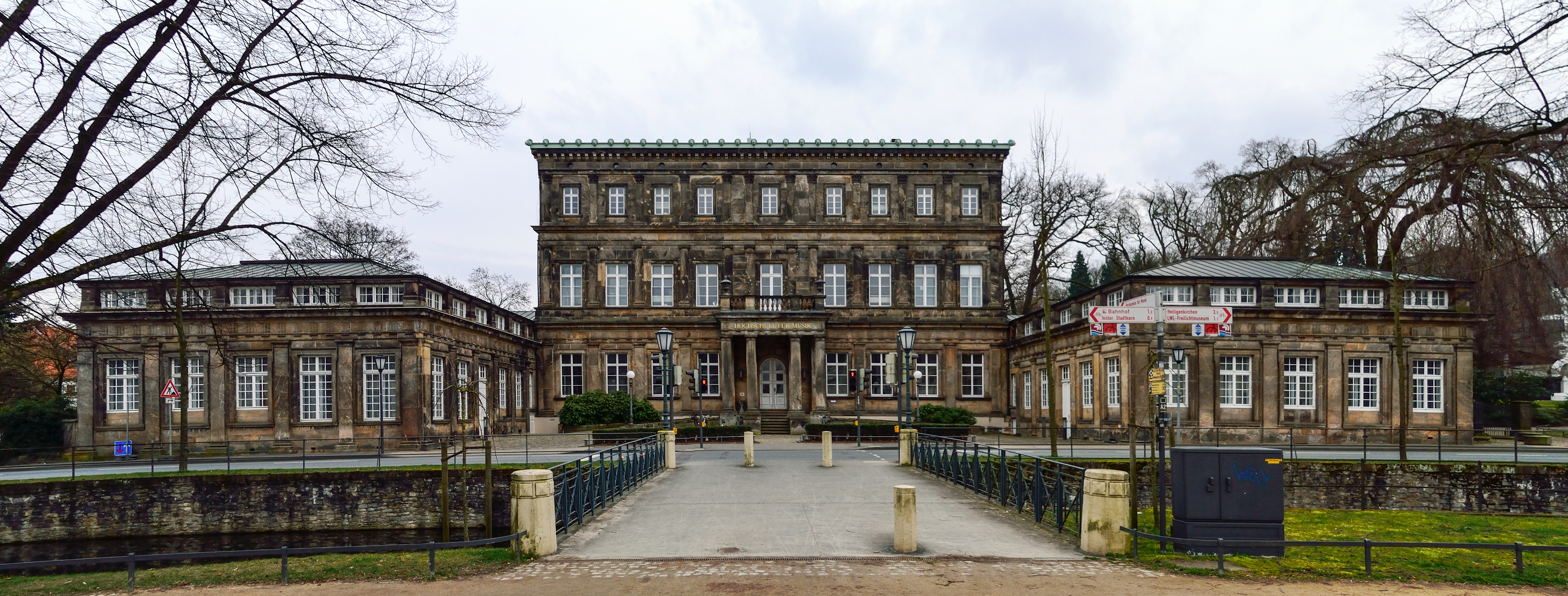
The New Palace at Detmold

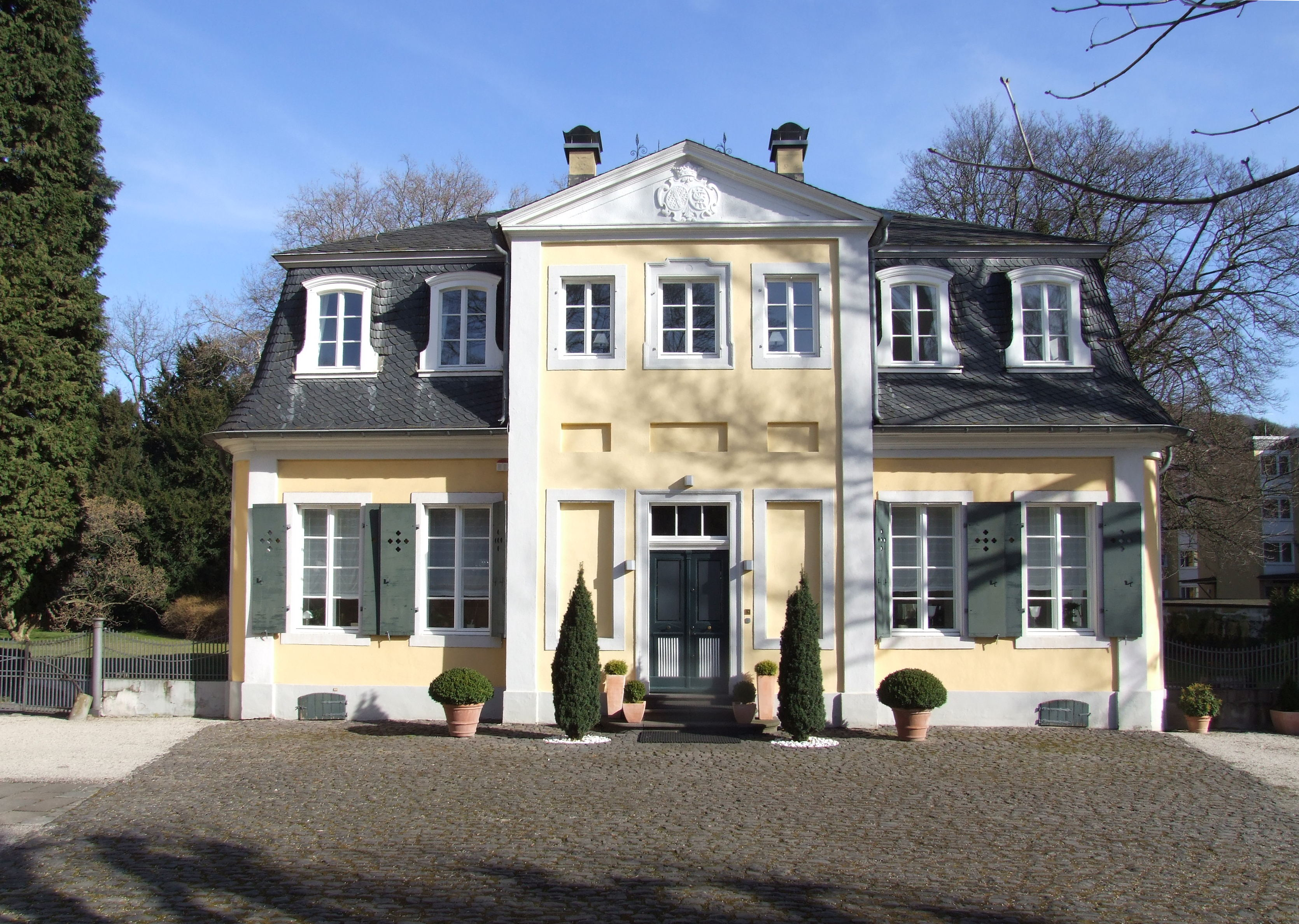
Lippe House at Oberkassel, Bonn, owned by the Lippe-Biesterfeld branch since 1770

— Royal house — House of Lippe
New title	Ruling House of Lippe; 1123–1918	Declared a Republic
New title	Ruling House of Schaumburg-Lippe; 1643–1918	Declared a Republic
