= Otto, Lord of Lippe =

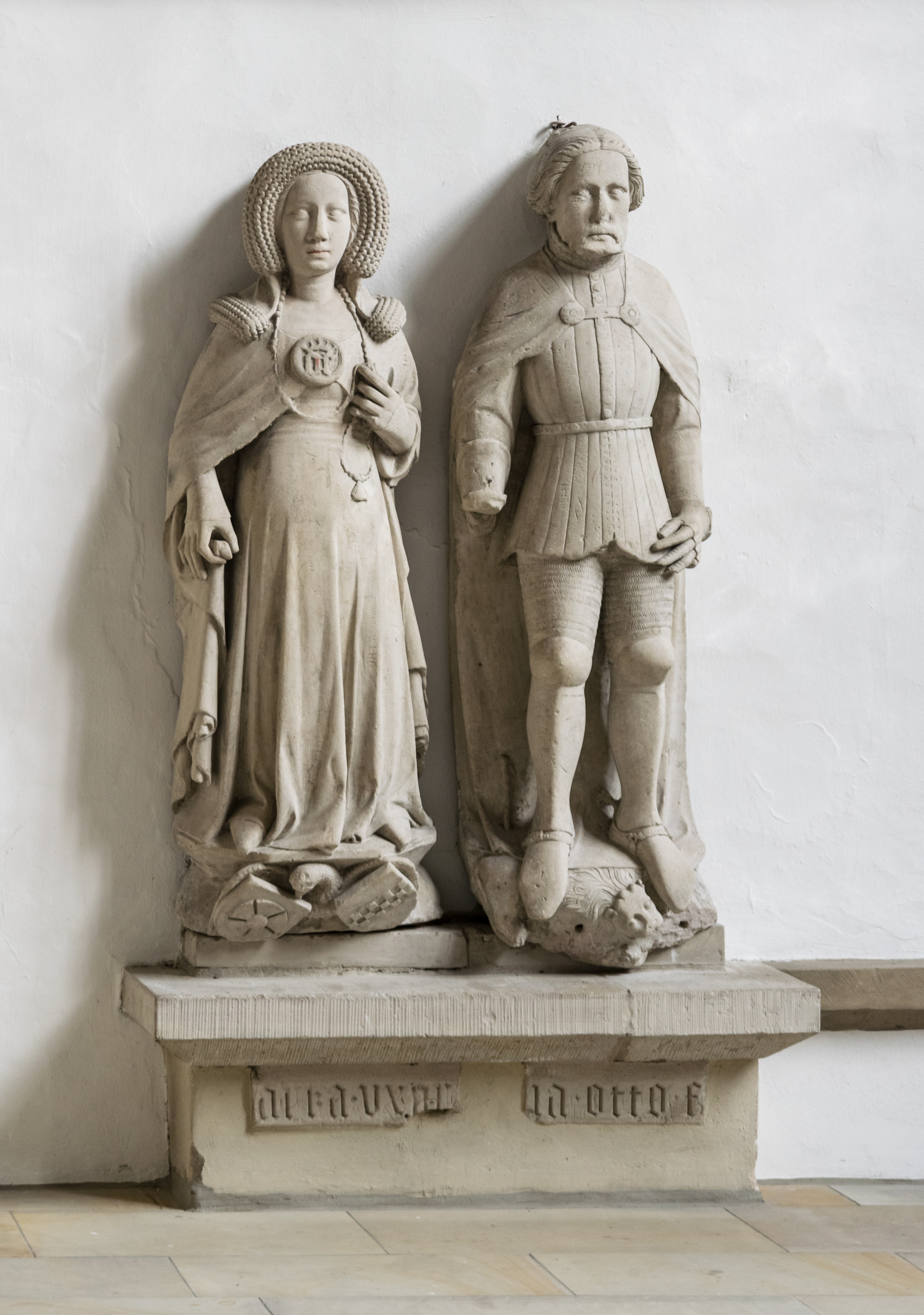
- Born: c. 1300
- Died: c. 1360; Lemgo
- Noble family: House of Lippe
- Spouse: Irmgard of the Marck
- Issue Detail: Simon III, Lord of Lippe
- Father: Simon I, Lord of Lippe
- Mother: Adelaide of Waldeck

Otto, Lord of Lippe (c. 1300 – c. 1360) was the ruling Count of Lippe-Lemgo from 1344 until his death.

== Life ==
He was the son of Simon I and his wife, Adelaide of Waldeck.

When his father died in 1344, Lippe was divided; Otto ruled the area around Lemgo, while his brother Bernard V ruled the area around Rheda.

Otto resided in Lemgo, which at the time consisted of two legally separate town: the Old Town and the New Town. In 1365, five years after Otto's death, these were amalgamated to form the Town of Lemgo.

== Marriage and issue ==
Otto was married to Irmgard of the Marck, daughter of Engelbert II of the Mark. They had three children:

- Simon III
- Margaret
- Adelaide

Otto, Lord of Lippe House of Lippe Born: c. 1300
Preceded by Simon I	Lord of Lippe-Lemgo; 1344–1360	Succeeded by Simon III
