= Bucksturm =

Historic tower in Osnabrück, Germany

Coordinates: 52.2775°N 8.0385°E

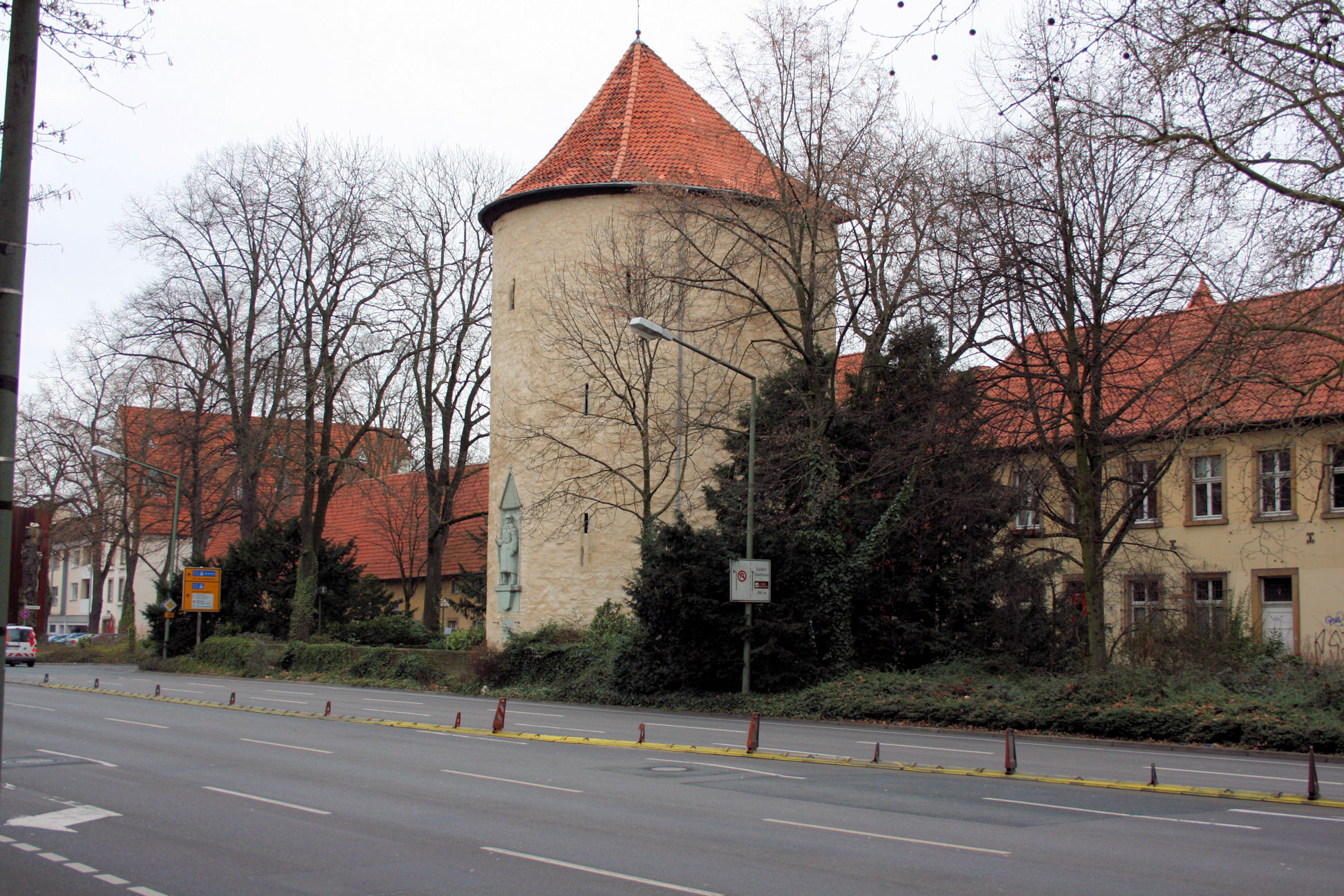
Bucksturm in Osnabrück

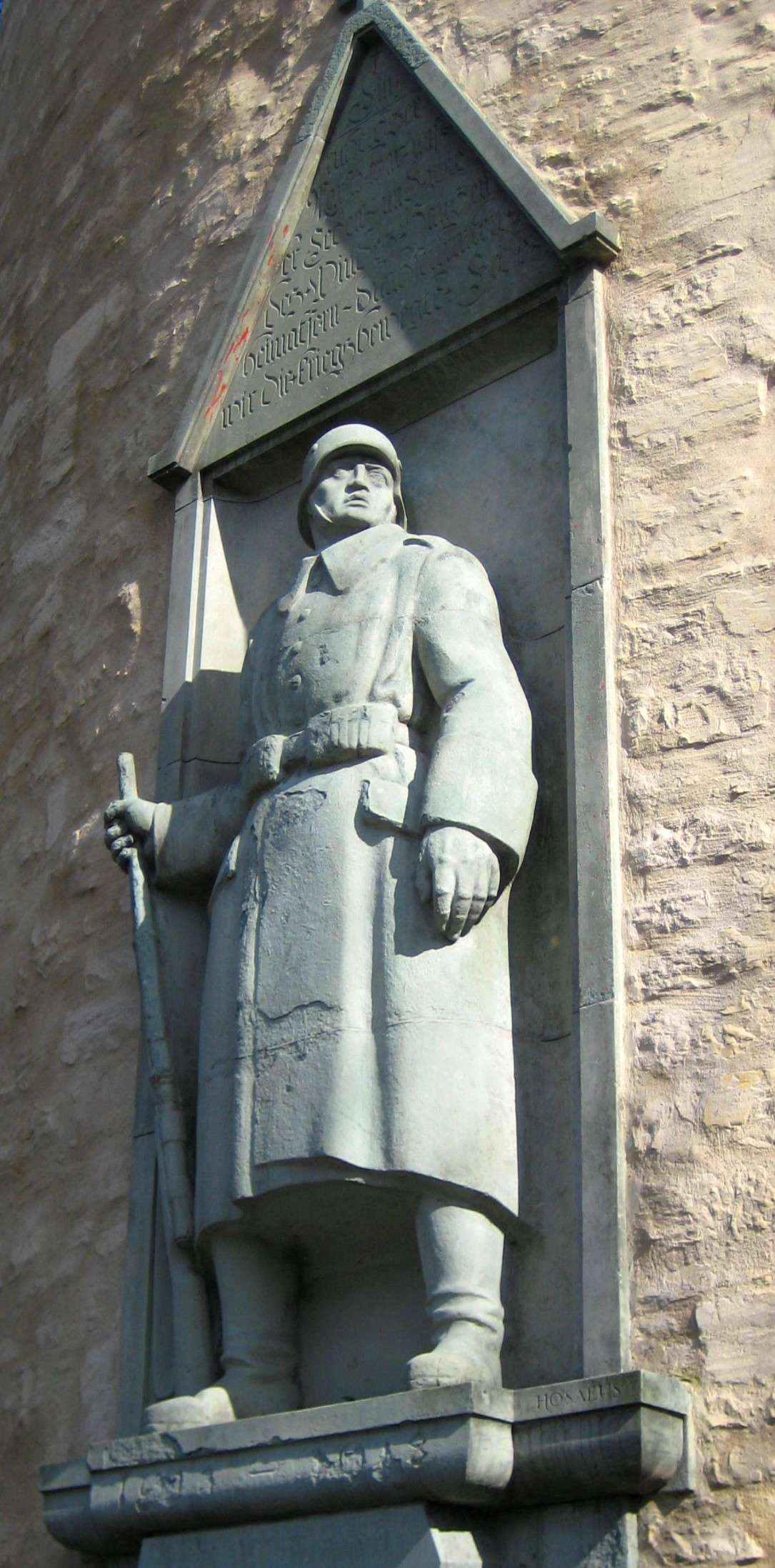
War memorial, added 1922

The Bucksturm (also formerly called the Bocksturm) is a listed historical structure in Osnabrück, Germany.

The tower with semi-circular layout was built at the beginning of the 13th century as a watchtower, positioned on the Osnabrück city wall between Heger Tor and Natruper Tor. This particular section of the wall was referred to as the Bocksmauer. The tower – whose diameter is 10.7 metres – supposedly acquired its name from a stone containing a roebuck’s head, which is said to have been bricked into the wall on the (no longer existent) top floor.

On the basis of its relatively narrow embrasures it can be reasonably assumed that the usage of cannons from the tower was never intended, rather that of smaller handheld weapons. During the medieval period the city prison was based in the tower. One person who was imprisoned here was Count Simon of Lippe in the early 14th century. From 1441 to 1448, Johann von Hoya was held in the so-called “Johanniskasten” (John’s Box) on the second floor. Further prisoners included six Anabaptist priests sent to Osnabrück from Münster; they were subsequently transferred to the Bennoturm at Iburg Castle on 18/19 October 1534. During the periods of intense witch-hunting in the 16th and 17th centuries the tower was also used as a torture chamber. Today the tower is home to an exhibition on witch-hunting, however the instruments of torture can no longer be seen despite still being around at the start of the 20th century. The tower was originally 28 metres tall, but due to dilapidation ten metres were removed from its height in 1805. Since then it has had four floors.

In 1922 a war memorial honouring the soldiers of the East Frisian Duke Friedrich Wilhelm of Brunswick infantry regiment (No. 78) was set up on the west side of the tower. The memorial was designed by sculptor Hermann Hosaeus (1875-1958). Made from Anröchte stone, it was dedicated on 1 October 1922.

== Literature ==
- Möller, H-H., Kämmerer, C., (eds.), Baudenkmale in Niedersachsen, Part 32, Stadt Osnabrück (Brunswick/Wiesbaden, 1986), p. 57 (ISBN 3-528-06209-6)
- Siebern, H., Fink, E. (eds.), Die Kunstdenkmäler der Provinz Hannover, IV. Regierungsbezirk Osnabrück, 1. und 2. Stadt Osnabrück (Hannover, 1907); Neudruck Kunstdenkmälerinventare Niedersachsens, Part 39. H. Th. Wenner (Osnabrück, 1978), p. 323-325 (ISBN 3-87898-133-3)
- Niedersächsisches Landesverwaltungsamt – Institut Denkmalpflege: Verzeichnis der Baudenkmale gem. § 4 (NDSchG), Stadt Osnabrück (15 July 1986), p. 7 (supplement on monuments in Lower Saxony)
- City of Osnabrück, the Lord Mayor, Department for Culture, Kunsthalle Dominikanerkirche (ed.), Kunst im Öffentlichen Raum (Osnabrück, 2007), p. 140 + 159
- Friedrich, E.A., “Der Bocksturm in Osnabrück” in Wenn Steine reden könnten, Part III, Landbuch-Verlag (Hannover, 1995), pps.175-177 (ISBN 3-7842-0515-1)

== Links ==
- Bucksturm in Osnabrück
