= Otto VI, Count of Tecklenburg =

- Died: 1388
- Noble family: House of Hagen
- Spouse: Adelaide of Lippe
- Issue: 2, including Nicholas II
- Father: Nicholas I, Count of Tecklenburg
- Mother: Helena of Oldenburg-Wildeshausen-Altbruchhausen

Otto VI, Count of Tecklenburg (died 1388) was the only son of Count Nicholas I and his wife, Helena of Oldenburg-Wildeshausen-Alt-Bruchhausen. In 1367, he succeeded his father as count of Tecklenburg-Ibbenbüren and count of Lingen and Cloppenburg. In 1376, he became pledge holder of Iburg.

Otto was a bold fighter. He improved the administration of the county and granted city rights to Bevergen. He acquired the bailiwicks of Clarholz, Marienfeld and Herzebrock. His marriage with Adelaide of Lippe gave him a claim on the cities of Rheda and Lipperode. This led to a lengthy dispute, which was resolved in 1401 by a compromise between his son Nicholas II and his second cousin Simon III of Lippe: Nicholas received Rheda, and Lipperode became a condominium between Lippe and the County of Mark

From 1372 to 1379, Otto was also administrator of the Bishopric of Osnabrück, after he had deposed bishop Melchior. In 1379, he was besieged in Rheda and had to surrender.

== Marriage and issue ==
Otto VI married Adelaide, the daughter of Lord Bernard V of Lippe. He had two children:

- Nicholas II (d. 1426)
- Hedwig, married Lord Gisbert VI of Bronckhorst-Borculo (d. 1409)

Otto VI, Count of Tecklenburg House of Schwerin Died: 1388
Preceded by Bernard V as Lord of Lippe	Lord of Rheda; 1364–1366	Succeeded by Simon III as Lord of Lippe
Preceded by Nicholas I	Count of Tecklenburg; 1367–1388	Succeeded by Nicholas II
