= Bernard V of Lippe =

German nobleman and Prince-Bishop

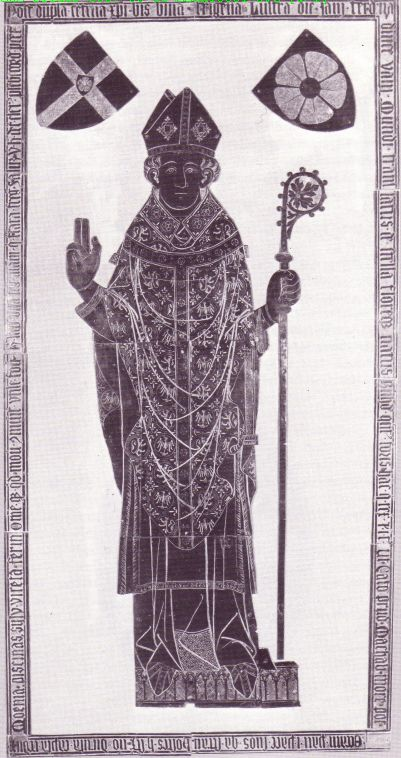
- His grave stone in Paderborn Cathedral
- Born: 1277
- Died: 1341 (aged 63–64)
- Buried: Paderborn Cathedral
- Noble family: House of Lippe
- Father: Simon I, Lord of Lippe
- Mother: Adelaide of Waldeck

Bernhard of Lippe (1277-1341) was a German nobleman. He was Prince-Bishop of Paderborn as Bernard V. He is considered the founder of the medieval Prince-bishopric. His territoriality focused policies are characterized by the fact that he was the first bishop who used his family name in his seal, instead of the episcopal title.

== Life ==
Bernhard was a member of the House of Lippe. His parents were Simon I and Adelaide, a daughter of Henry III of Waldeck. In 1305, he was appointed provost of Paderborn under Bishop Otto of Rietberg. He was later appointed as tutor and defensor of the Bishop's territory, and was de facto governor for bishops Günther I (1307-1310) and Dietrich II (1310-1321). From 1321 until his death, he held the office of Bishop himself.

He often consulted the Estates about issues regarding the worldly reign of his bishopric and this gave him a strong position. In 1309, a standing council was created, composed of four canons and ministeriales and two citizens from Paderborn and two from Warburg. Bernard promulgated a statue obliging him to take the advice from this council into account. His statue defining the interplay between the Bishop, the cathedral chapter, the Estates and the citizens would shape the territory for a long time. He consolidated the principality's sovereignty by promoting the cities in the bishopric, by purchasing the larger part of the town of Brakel and by founding the cities of Dringenberg and Peckelsheim. Paderborn became one of the wealthiest cities in Westphalia. Bernard strengthened Marienmünster Abbey and the market towns of Vörden, Bredenborn and the town of Beverungen with financial donations.

To finance his activities, Bernard used both tax money and his own money. After the food crisis of 1316/1317, an economic crisis ensued. In 1326, this forced Bernard to close a deal with the cathedral chapter and the Estates. Known as the Privilegium Bernhardi, it obliged the Bishop to consult with the Estates before levying taxes; the Estates promised to grant such requests when they were necessary.

Bernard V of Lippe House of Lippe Born: 1277 Died: 1341
Preceded by Dietrich II of Itter	Bishop of Paderborn; 1321-1341	Succeeded by Baldwin of Steinfurt
