= Bernard III of Lippe =

Bernard III
- Lord of Lippe
- Born: c. 1194
- Died: c. 1265
- Noble family: Lippe
- Spouses: Sophie of Cuijck-Arnsberg; Sophie of Ravensberg-Vechta
- Issue Detail: Bernard IV, Lord of Lippe
- Father: Herman II, Lord of Lippe
- Mother: Oda of Tecklenburg

Bernard III, Lord of Lippe (c. 1194 – c. 1265) was a German nobleman. He was the ruling Lord of Lippe from 1229 until his death.

== Life ==
Bernard III was the son of Lord Herman II and his wife, Oda of Tecklenburg. His father fell in battle in 1229, and Bernard III succeeded him as Lord of Lippe. After 1232, he would style himself by the grace of God, and sometimes Count of Lippe.

Bernard was bellicose, like his brothers and his grandfather Bernard I. He was diocesan administrator of the Bishopric of Paderborn from 1254 to 1256. Some authors consider him the founder of Lippe as a territorial entity. Via his brother, Bishop Simon I of Paderbron he acquired furthers offices, and reorganized the church in his principality.

He promoted the cities of Horn and Blomberg. He had a dispute with the city of Lippstadt, because it would not allow him to build a castle. He also fought feuds against the cities of Ravensberg and Sternberg, and against the House of Waldeck. His frequent feuds weakened the House of Lippe.

== Marriage and issue ==
Bernard III married twice. Around 1230, he married Sophie of Cuijck-Arnsberg (c. 1210 – c. 1245). She was the daughter of Count Gottfried II of Arnsberg and Rietberg and his wife Elisabeth. Bernard III and Sophie had the following children together:

- Bernard IV (c. 1230 – c. 1275)
- Herman III (c. 1233 – 3 October 1274)
- Hedwig (c. 1238 – 5 March 1315, married Count Otto III of Ravensberg
- Gerhard (c. 1240 – 1259), provost of Bremen Cathedral chapter, lost a feud against Hildebold of Wunstorf over the succession to the Archbishopric of Bremen
- Dietrich (c. 1244 – after 1271), pastor at Minden Cathedral

Bernard remarried after Sopie's death; in 1248 he married Sophie of Ravensberg-Vechta c. 1220 – after 3 June 1285), a daughter of Count Otto II of Ravensberg and Countess Sophie of Oldenburg. From this marriage, Bernard had four more children:

- Elisabeth (c. 1250 – after 1316), married Count Baldwin II of Steinfurt
- Agnes (c. 1251 – 1307), married Count Hoyer I of Sternberg
- Adelaide, married Count Adolph I of Schwalenberg
- Sophie (c. 1249 – 1 February 1275), married Count Albert I of Regenstein

== Footnotes ==
Bernard III of Lippe House of Lippe Born: c. 1194 Died: c. 1265
Preceded by Herman II	Lord of Lippe; 1229–1265	Succeeded by Bernard IV
Preceded by Herman II	Lord of Rheda; 1229–1265	Succeeded by Bernard IV
