= Bernard V, Lord of Lippe =

- Born: c. 1290
- Died: before 1365
- Noble family: House of Lippe
- Spouse: Richarda of the Marck
- Father: Simon I, Lord of Lippe
- Mother: Adelaide of Waldeck

Bernhard V, Lord of Lippe (c. 1290 – before 1365) was a member of the House of Lippe and was Lord of Rheda from 1344 until his death.

== Life ==
Bernard was the son of Lord Simon I and Adelaide of Waldeck. His eldest brother was also called Bernard V and was Prince-Bishop of Paderborn.

After his father's death in 1344, the county was divided. Bernhard was given the area around Rheda and Lippstadt. His brother Otto was given the area around Lemgo.

When Bernhard died around 1365, his widow initially gave his inheritance to Otto VI of Tecklenburg, the husband of her eldest daughter. In 1366, she revoked this gift and transferred the territory to her nephew Simon III. Otto VI, however, objected and started a feud which lasted several decades and was finally resolved in favour of the Tecklenburg family.

== Marriage and issue ==
Bernard V was married to Richarda of the Marck. Their children were:

- Simon (d. before 1363)
- Adelaide (d. 1392), married in 1362 to Count Otto VI of Tecklenburg
- Mechtild (d. 1365), married Count Henry II of Holstein-Rendsburg
- Heilwig

Bernard V, Lord of Lippe House of Lippe Born: c. 1290 Died: before 1365
Preceded by Simon I as Lord of Lippe	Lord of Rheda; 1344–1364	Succeeded by Otto VI as Count of Tecklenburg
