= Adelaide of Waldeck =

- Born: c. 1264
- Died: c. 1339-1342
- Noble family: House of Waldeck
- Spouse: Simon I, Lord of Lippe
- Issue: Bernard V of Lippe; Herman; Hendrik; Diedritch; Simon; Otto, Lord of Lippe; Bernard V, Lord of Lippe; Adolph; Matilda; Adelaide; Hedwig
- Father: Henry III, Lord of Waldeck
- Mother: Matilda of Arnsberg-Cuyk

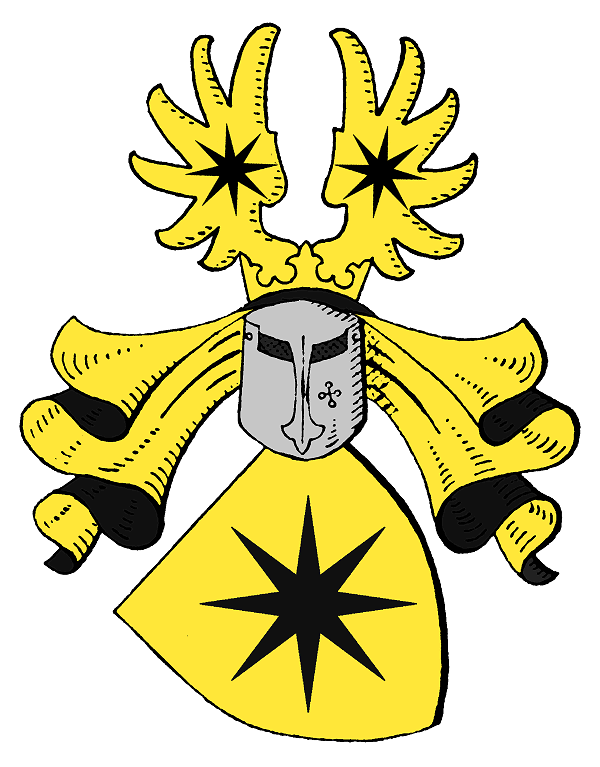

Adelaide of Waldeck (c. 1264 – c. 1339–1342) was a daughter of Lord Henry III of Waldeck and his wife Matilda of Arnsberg-Cuyk (also known as Matilda of Rietberg-Arnsberg).

She married on 24 November 1276 to Simon I of Lippe and had the following children:

- Bernard (127–1341), Bishop of Paderborn
- Herman (d. c. 1324), a cleric
- Hendrik (d. c. 1336), a cleric
- Diedrich (d. after 8 September 1326), Knight in the Teutonic Order
- Simon (d. c. 1332)
- Otto († 1360), Lord of Lippe in Lemgo
- Bernard V (d. before 1365), Lord of Lippe in Rheda
- Adolph
- Matilda (d. after 9 April 1366), married c. 1310 to John II, Count of Bentheim (d. 1332)
- Adelaide, married Herman II of Everstein-Polle (about September 29, 1324?) (d. c. 1351)
- Hedwig (d. after March 5, 1369), married Count Adolph VII of Holstein-Pinneburg and Schauenburg (d. 1352)
