= Bernard VI of Lippe =

Lord of Lippe (c. 1370–1415)

Bernard VI, Lord of Lippe
- Born: c. 1370
- Died: 1415
- Noble family: House of Lippe
- Spouses: Margaret of Waldeck-Landau; Elisabeth of Moers
- Issue Detail: Simon IV, Lord of Lippe
- Father: Simon III, Lord of Lippe
- Mother: Irmgard of Hoya

Bernhard VI, Lord of Lippe (c. 1370 – 1415) was a German nobleman. He was the ruling Lord of Lippe from 1410 until his death. He was the son of Simon III and his wife, Irmgard of Hoya.

== Marriage and issue ==
On 28 June 1393, he married Margaret, the daughter of Count Henry VI of Waldeck-Landau. This marriage remained childless.

He remarried in 1403, to Elisabeth of Moers. They had four children together:

- Simon IV (1404–1429), Lord of Lippe from 1415 until his death
- Frederick (d. between 1417 and 1425)
- Otto (died in Brake on 30 September 1433), joined the clergy
- Irmgard (d. 17 July 1463), married c. 1428 to Lord William of Buren (d. 1461)

Bernard VI of Lippe House of Lippe Born: c. 1370 Died: 1415
Preceded by Simon III	Lord of Lippe; 1410–1415	Succeeded by Simon IV
