= Otto III of Ravensberg =

Count of Ravensberg (1249-1306)

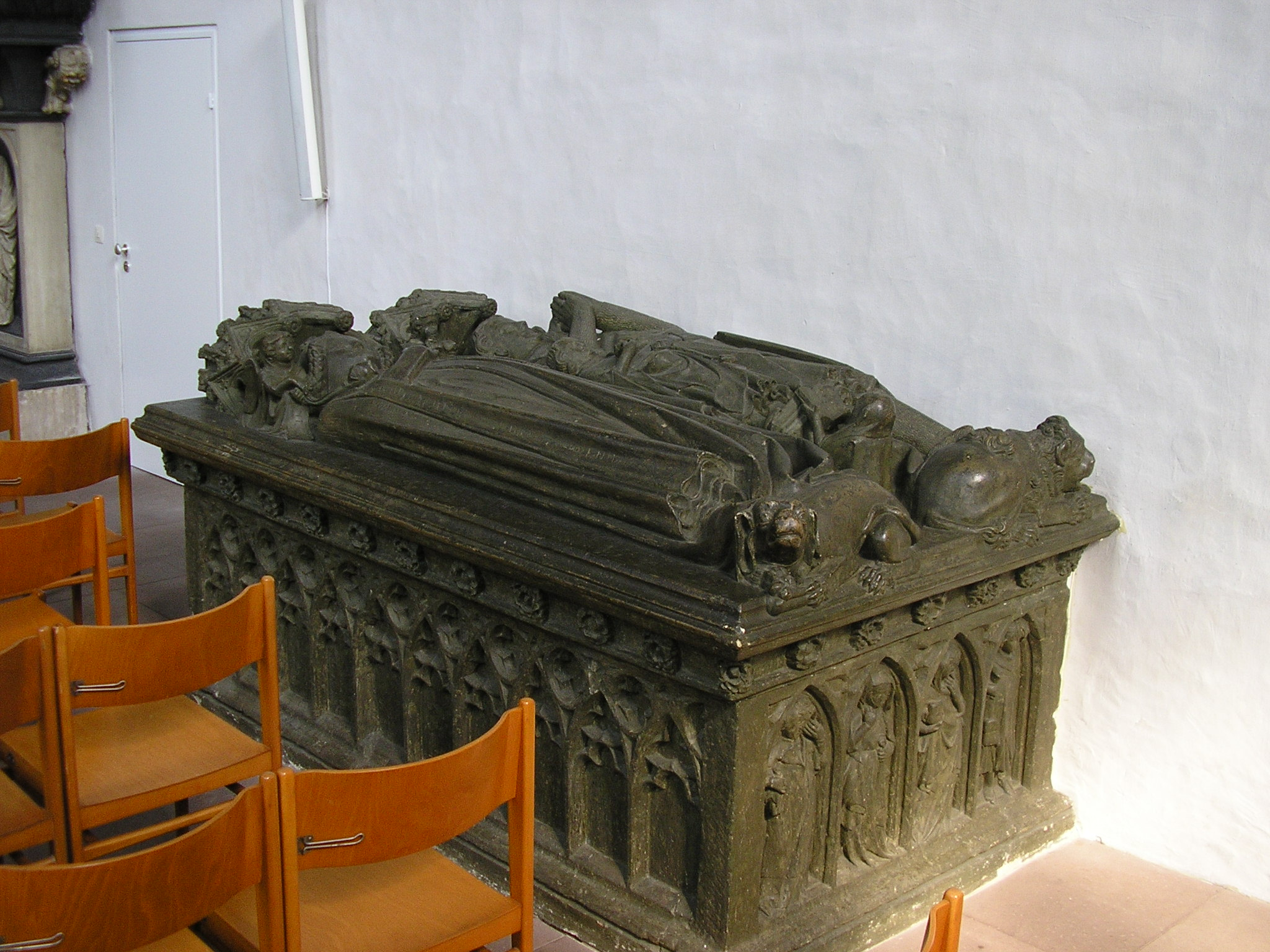
- Otto's grave in the Church of St. Mary in Bielefeld
- Born: c. 1246
- Died: 5 March 1306
- Buried: Church of St. Mary in Bielefeld
- Noble family: House Calvelage-Ravensberg
- Spouse: Hedwig of Lippe
- Father: Louis, Count of Ravensberg
- Mother: Adelheid of Dassel

Otto III of Ravensberg (c. 1246 – 5 March 1306) was Count of Ravensberg from 1249 until his death.

== Life ==
Otto III was the son of Count Louis of Ravensberg and his wife Adelheid of Dassel. His younger brother Louis was bishop of Osnabrück.

After his father died in 1249, there were some problems with his succession. Since he and his brothers were still minors, Lord Bernard III of Lippe took up the regency for Otto III and his brothers Louis and John. Their mother, Adelaide, fled with her children to her relatives in Ratzeburg, whereupon Bernard forcibly occupied Ravensberg Castle. Eventually, Otto III was installed as Count of Ravensberg.

In 1264, Otto III was victorious in a feud against the Count of Gesmold. In 1267, he fought on the side of Archbishop Engelbert II of Cologne in the Battle of Zülpich.

After Count Henry IV of Oldenburg-Wildeshausen died in 1270, Vlotho Castle came into the joint possession of Otto III and his cousin Henry of Berg. In 1290, Henry's successor Gerhard sold his share to Archbishop Siegfried II of Cologne.

On 5 March 1271, Otto III married Hedwig of Lippe.

In 1277, Otto III concluded a secret alliance with Bishop Conrad III of Osnabrück, Bishop Everhard of Münster and Herford Abbey against the Lords of Lippe.

On 12 July 1293, Otto III and his wife Hedwig found an abbey at Bielefeld. It was required that the abbey house at least twelve canons. The existing Church of St. Mary was used as the abbey church. The Count of Ravensberg would hold the right of patronage.

Otto III died in 1306. He and his wife were buried in the abbey they had founded in Bielefeld. Otto's son Otto IV succeeded him as Count of Ravensberg.

== Marriage and children ==
On 5 March 1271, Otto III married Hedwig of Lippe (c. 1238 – 5 March 1315), the daughter of Bernard III of Lippe. They had nine children:

- Uda (between 1268 and 1276 – 25 June 1313), married John I of Isenburg-Limburg;
- Hedwig (d. after 1346), married as his second wife to Torgils Knutsson (d. 9 February 1306);
- Herman (died near Milan)
- Louis (d. after 1294)
- Otto IV, Count of Ravensberg, (before 1276 – between 20 February and 6 March 1329), married to Margaret of Berg (c. 1275-1280 – after 1339)
- Bernard (d. 10 August 1346)
- Sophie (before 1276 – after 1328); married Count Hildebald I of Oldenburg-Altbruchhausen (before 1270 – after 1310)
- Adelaide (c. 1270 – between 1335 and 1339); married in 1297 Landgrave Otto I of Hesse (c. 1272 – 17 January 1328 in Kassel)
- Jutta (d. before 10 August 1305); married before 28 November 1282, to Count Dietrich II of Honstein-Klettenberg (d. between 10 August and 13 December 1305)
