= Rheda, Germany =

Rheda
- Ortsteil of Rheda-Wiedenbrück
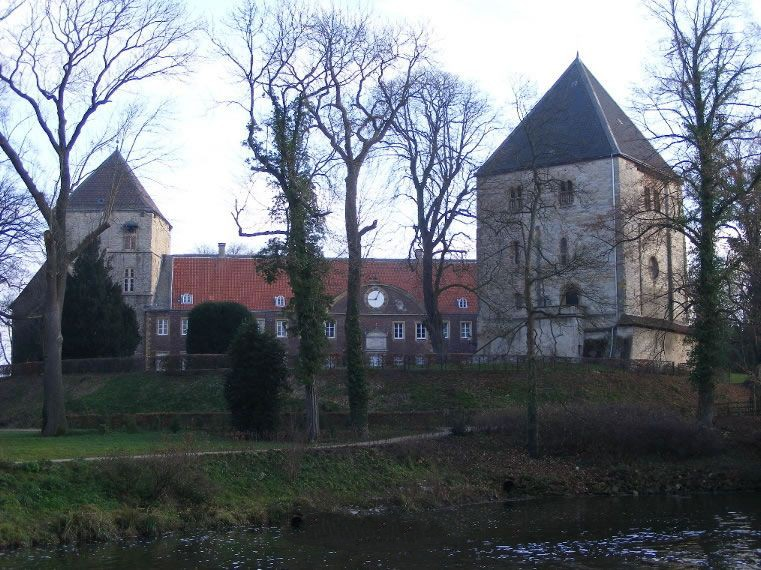
- Rheda Castle
- Interactive map of Rheda
- Location within Germany Location within North Rhine-Westphalia
- Coordinates: 51°51′N 8°18′E
- Country: Germany
- State: North Rhine-Westphalia
- District: Gütersloh
- Town: Rheda-Wiedenbrück
- Time zone: UTC+01:00 (CET)
  - Summer (DST): UTC+02:00 (CEST)

Rheda (German pronunciation: [ˈʁeːda]) is a town in North Rhine-Westphalia, a part of the municipality of Rheda-Wiedenbrück in the Kreis of Gütersloh.

== History ==
Rheda was first mentioned in documents from the year 1085, at the latest 1088. Rheda Castle was, from 1170 until 1807 or 1815, the manor house of the Manor of Rheda.

The Lordship was created from the Freigericht (free court or free jurisdiction) of Rheda and the Vögterei (stewardship) over the abbeys of Liesborn and Freckenhorst. On the death of the first Lord, Widukind of Rheda, in the Third Crusade, the lordship was inherited by Bernhard II, Lord of Lippe. Bernhard's successor, Hermann II, moved the seat of his lordship to Rheda Castle.

On the death of Bernhard V without an heir in 1364, the Lordship of Rheda was seized by Bernhard's son-in-law, Otto V, Count of Tecklenburg, unlike the rest of the Lippian inheritance, which passed to Simon III, brother of Bernhard V; 130 years later, Tecklenburg reimbursed Lippe for this annexation with a payment of 7200 Rhenish gulden (German: Rheinischer Münzverein).

From the Tecklenburger annexation, the lordship followed the path of that county. In the course of the Napoleonic Wars, the territory was annexed to the Napoleonic satellite Grand Duchy of Berg and was awarded to the Kingdom of Prussia by the Congress of Vienna, becoming part of the Prussian province of Westphalia, where it remained beyond the German Revolution and the abolition of the German monarchies in the aftermath of World War I until the reorganisation of Germany under the Allied Occupation powers, when it became a part of the newly created state of North Rhine-Westphalia.
