= Lippe-Weissenfeld =

Branch of the House of Lippe

House of Lippe-Weissenfeld
- Coat of arms of the House of Lippe combining the Lippian rose with the coat of arms of the counts of Schwalenberg
- Parent house: House of Lippe
- Country: Weißenfeld, Lippe, Germany, Austria
- Founded: 1734 (1st cadet house); 1916 (2nd cadet house); 1918 (3rd cadet house)
- Founder: Ferdinand Johann Ludwig, Count of Lippe-Weissenfeld (1709-1787)
- Current head: Ferdinand, 5th Prince of Lippe-Weissenfeld (b. 1942)
- Titles: Prince of Lippe; Prince of Lippe-Weissenfeld; Count of Lippe-Weissenfeld

The House of Lippe-Weissenfeld (German spelling: Lippe-Weißenfeld) was a comital and later princely cadet branch of the House of Lippe, a dynasty ruling the Principality of Lippe, once a state of the Holy Roman Empire, until the German Revolution of 1918–19.

== Branches of the House of Lippe ==
The Lippe-Weissenfeld branch split from the non-ruling comital paragium branch (non-sovereign estates of a cadet-branch) of Lippe-Biesterfeld in 1734. However, in 1905, the Lippe-Biesterfeld branch inherited the throne of Lippe, with Leopold IV, Prince of Lippe reigning until the German revolution of 1918. Another junior branch of the House of Lippe was the Schaumburg-Lippe, which from 1647 ruled the county, and from 1807, Principality of Schaumburg-Lippe until 1918.

== Counts ==
Lippe-Weissenfeld is the name of a cadet branch of the formerly ruling House of Lippe. The branch split from the Lippe-Biesterfeld line when Ferdinand Johann Ludwig, Count of Lippe-Biesterfeld (1709-1787), received Weissenfeld manor house in the forest near Schieder-Schwalenberg as his seat in 1734. Both, Biesterfeld and Weissenfeld were so-called paragiums (non-sovereign estates of a cadet-branch) within the County of Lippe, the later Principality of Lippe which existed until 1918. The County of Schwalenberg was inherited by the Counts of Lippe in 1365, and the estates of Biesterfeld and Weissenfeld were parts of it. Simon VII, Count of Lippe begat a younger son, Count Jobst Hermann (1625-1678) who founded the line of Counts of Lippe-Biesterfeld, and whose grandson, Count Ferdinand founded a cadet (junior) branch of the family that became Counts of Lippe-Weissenfeld.

== Princes ==
The brothers count Ferdinand (1772–1846) and count Christian (1777–1859) founded two branches of the line of Lippe-Weissenfeld. On 24 February 1916 the members of the elder branch, namely the family of Count Clemens zur Lippe-Weissenfeld (1860-1920) and his legitimate male line descendants, were granted the title of Prince/Princess with the style of Serene Highness.

On 9 November 1918, all other legitimate cadet male/female members of the younger Lippe-Weissenfeld branch were also upgraded from the title of Count/Countess with the style Illustrious Highness and granted the title of Prince/Princess with the style of Serene Highness by Leopold IV, Prince of Lippe, who officially renounced the throne of Lippe three days later, on 12 November 1918.

== Rulers ==
=== Princes of Lippe-Weißenfeld (1916) ===
- Clemens, 1st Prince of Lippe-Weißenfeld 1916-1920 (1860-1920) ⚭ Baroness Friederike von Carlowitz (1878-1942), heiress of Proschwitz castle
  - Ferdinand, 2nd Prince of Lippe-Weißenfeld 1920-1939 (1903-1939) ⚭ Princess Dorothea von Schönburg-Waldenburg (1905-2000)
    - Franz, 3rd Prince of Lippe-Weißenfeld 1939-1995 (1929-1995) ⚭ Lucia Stassen (b. 1922)
  - Christian, 4th Prince of Lippe-Weißenfeld 1995-1996 (1907-1996) ⚭ Countess Pauline zu Ortenburg (1913-2002)
    - Ferdinand, 5th Prince of Lippe-Weißenfeld, 1996–present (b. 1942) ⚭ Baroness Karoline von Feilitzsch (b. 1939)
      - Ferdinand, Hereditary Prince of Lippe-Weißenfeld (b. 1976) ⚭ Princess Auguste of Bavaria (b. 1979), daughter of Prince Luitpold of Bavaria
        - Louis-Ferdinand Ludwig Beatus Bernhard Christopher Julio Patrick, Prince of Lippe-Weissenfeld (b. 2013)
        - Carl Philipp, Prince of Lippe-Weissenfeld (b. 2015)

== Properties of the Counts and Princes of Lippe-Weißenfeld ==
During the 18th century, the branch continued to live at the rather modest Weissenfeld manor house and also owned the Weissenfelder Hof (Weissenfeld court) in Lemgo, which both no longer exist. Towards the end of the 18th century, the family inherited considerable estates in the Electorate of Saxony, and moved there. Friedrich Ludwig, 2nd Count of Lippe-Weissenfeld (1737-1791), whose seat now was castle Saßleben in Calau, received the lordship of Baruth (including the estates of Rackel and Buchwalde) from his wife's family, the counts von Gersdorff, in 1797, and later also acquired the smaller estates of Dauban and Sornitz. Baruth bei Bautzen must be distinguished from Baruth/Mark, a lordship of the counts and later princes of Solms-Baruth.

His elder son Ferdinand (1773-1846) inherited the Baruth lordship, while the latter's younger half-brother Christian (1777–1859) founded the younger line and received the estate of Teichnitz near Bautzen from the counts von Hohenthal, the family of his mother as well as of his wife. Later some smaller estates such as Lubachau, Gersdorf and Döberkitz were added. His grandson Clemens, 1st Prince of Lippe-Weißenfeld (1860–1920), acquired Schloss Proschwitz near Meissen by marriage to Baroness Friederike von Carlowitz in 1910. All properties were expropriated in the Soviet occupation zone in 1945.

After the German reunification of 1990, Prince Georg of Lippe-Weissenfeld, a younger son of Christian, 4th Prince of Lippe-Weissenfeld, re-purchased the estate and castle of Proschwitz and established the renowned wine estate Prinz zur Lippe, Saxony's largest private winery. Besides the wine production, he opens the castle for concerts, balls, banquets, conferences and weddings.

In 1895 Count Egmont zur Lippe-Weissenfeld (1841-1896) bought Castle Pfaffstätt in Austria. After his death, a year later in 1896, his family continued to occupy the castle until 1909 when they resold it to Adolf Freiherr von Peckenzell, whose family owned the castle until 1868, when they had to sell it to a banker, Heinrich Klinkosch (1830-1889), uncle of Princess Johanna of Liechtenstein. Egmont's younger son, Prince Alfred zur Lippe-Weissenfeld (1881-1960), by virtue of marriage to Countess Anna von Goëss (1895-1972) came into a possession of Castle Alt-Wartenburg in Austria, where his son Prince Egmont of Lippe-Weissenfeld spent his youth and where his sisters, princesses Karola, Sophia and Theodora were born. The castle was heavily damaged in 1945 during WWII. Ratibořice Castle in Bohemia was owned by Count Oktavio of Lippe-Weissenfeld (1808-1885) from 1840 until 1842.

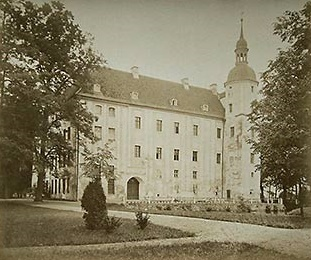
Baruth Castle (Oberlausitz, Saxony)

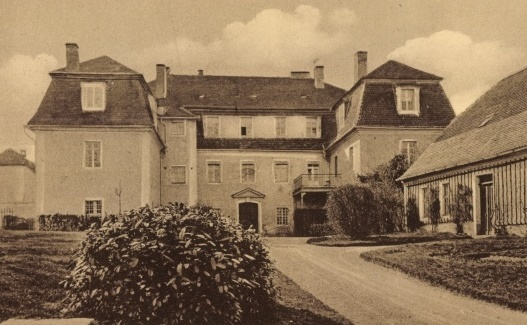
Schloss Teichnitz, (Saxony)

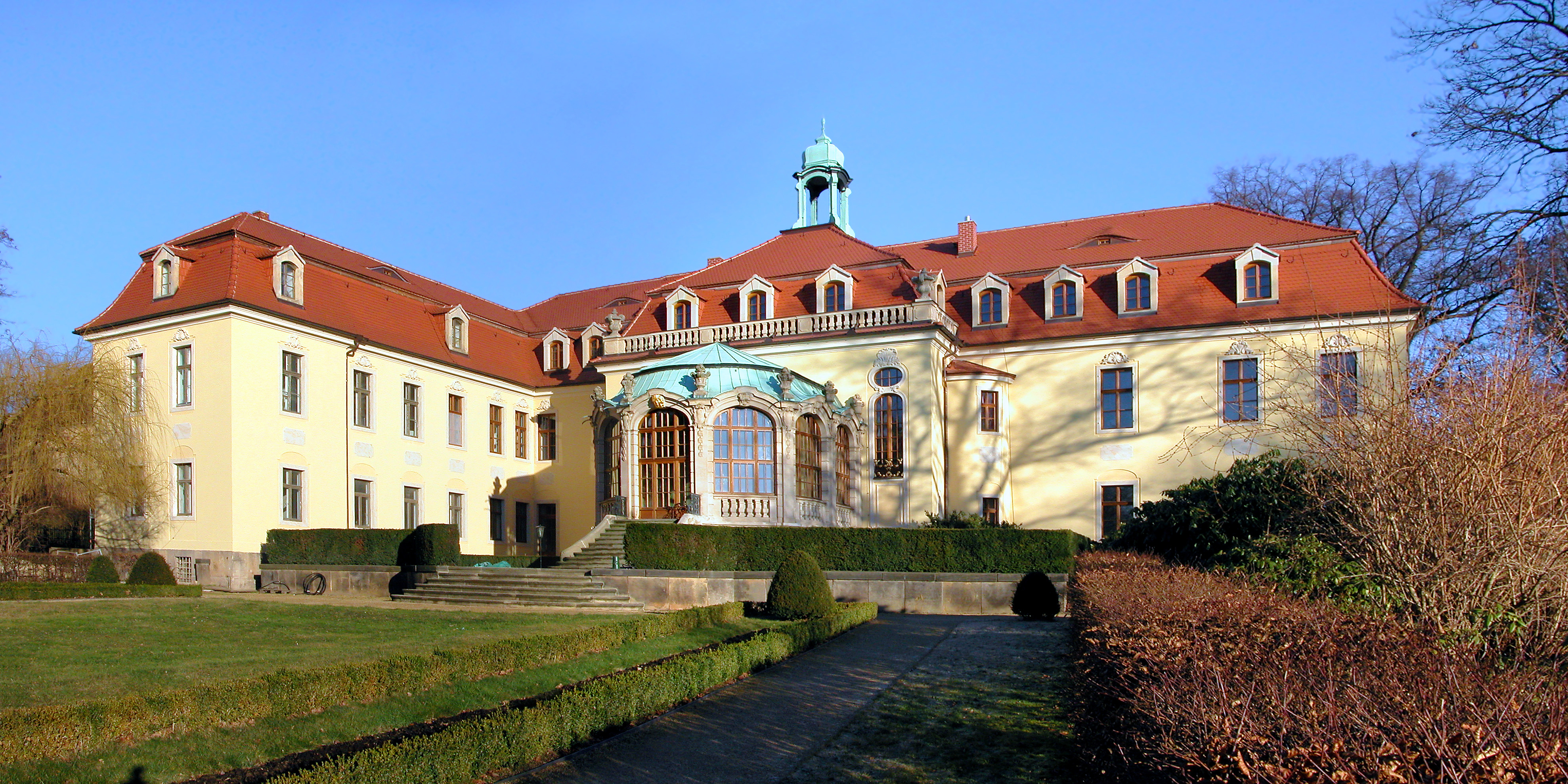
Schloss Proschwitz (Meissen, Saxony)

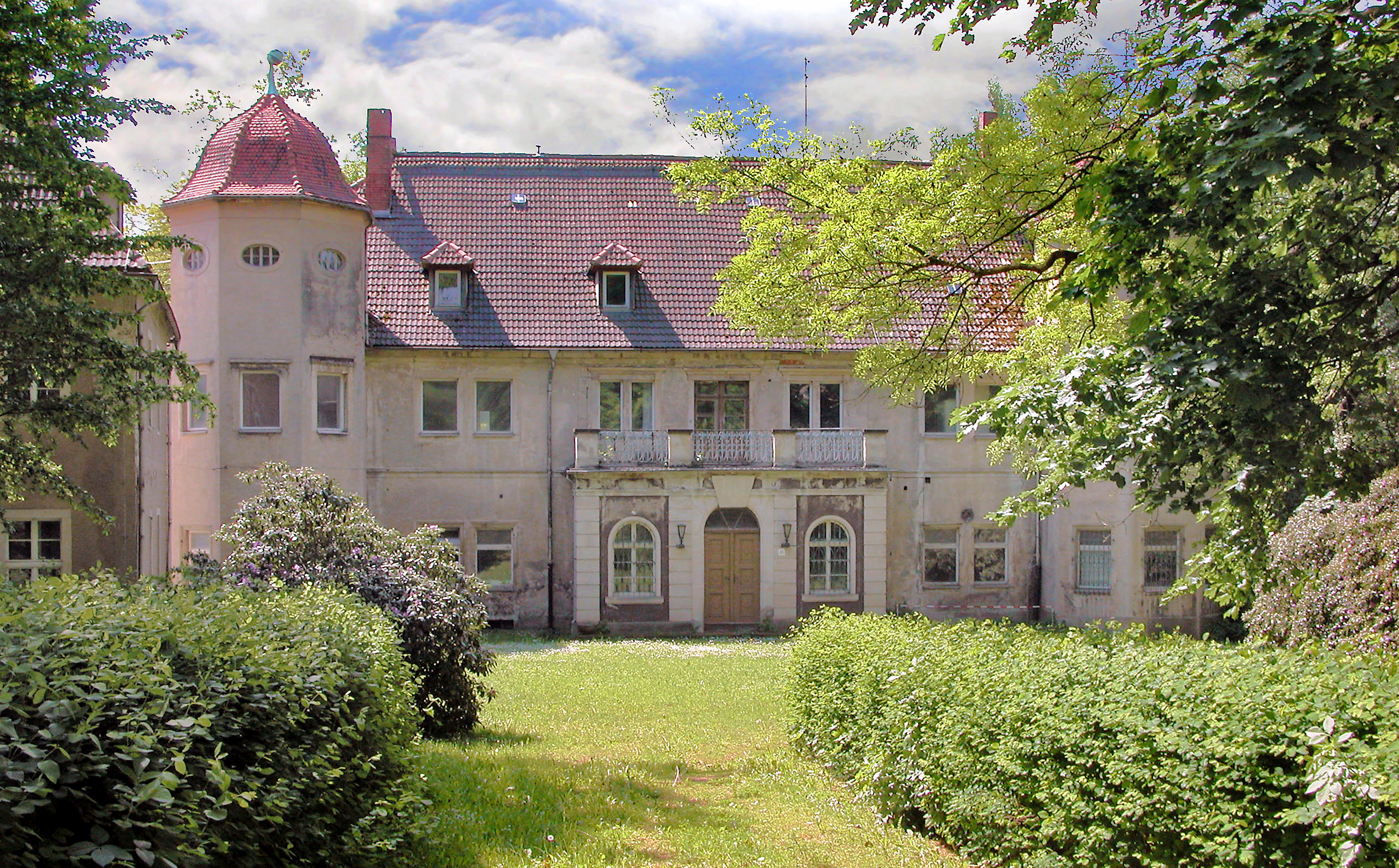
Schloss Gersdorf (Striegistal, Saxony)

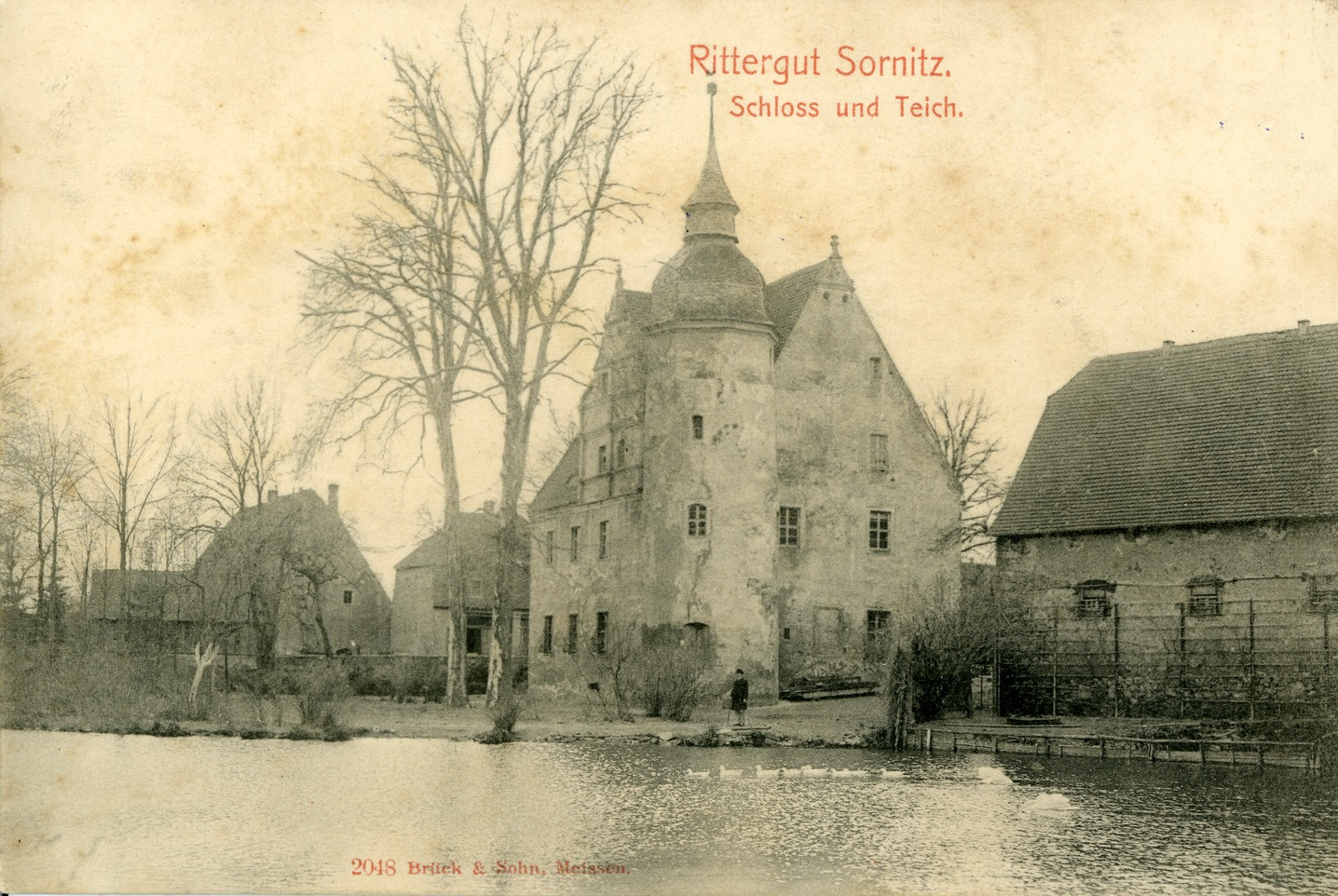
Schloss Sornitz (Meissen, Saxony)

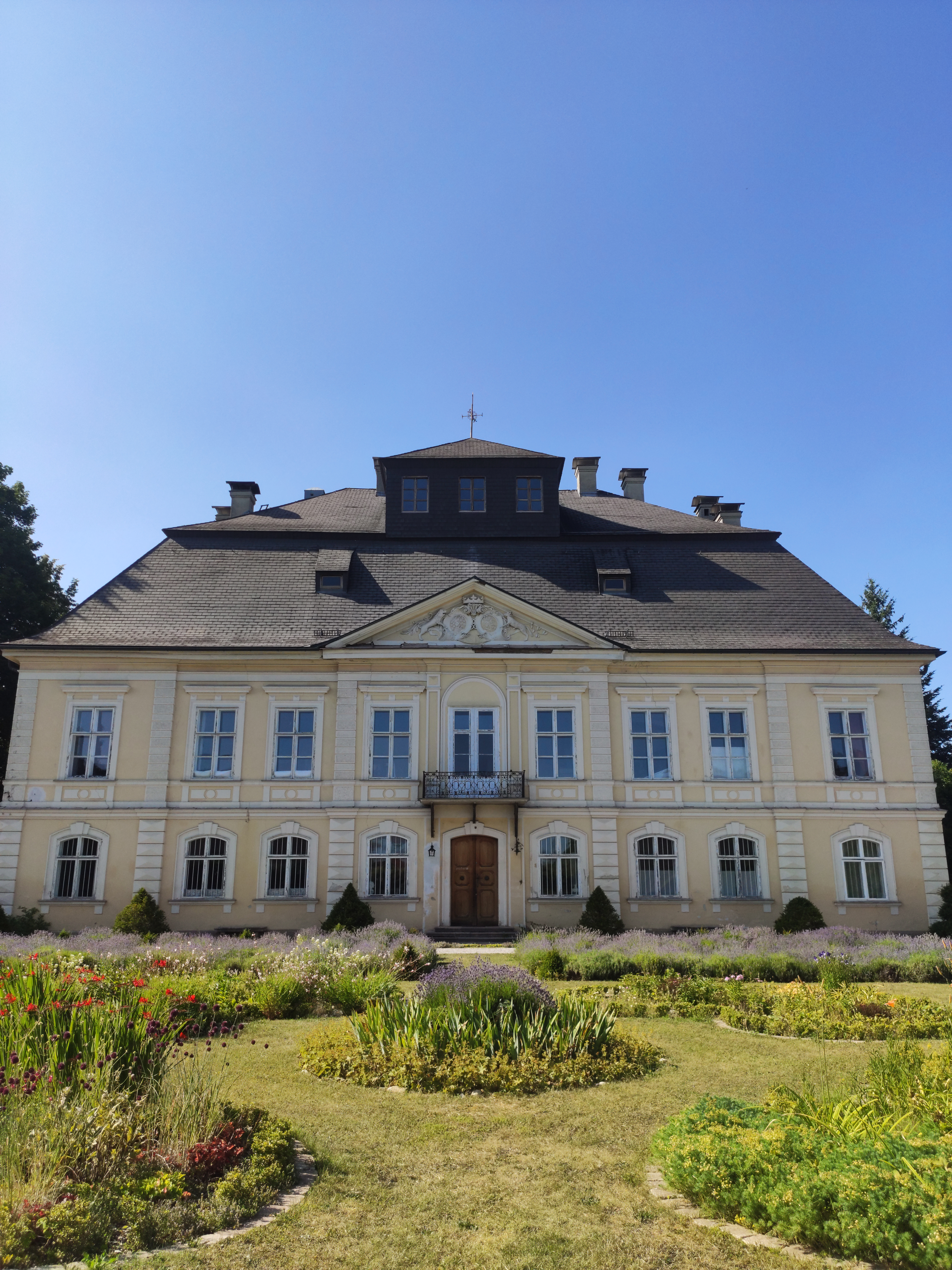
Schloss Pfaffstätt, from 1895 until 1909 owned by members of Lippe-Weissenfeld younger line (Pfaffstätt, Austria)

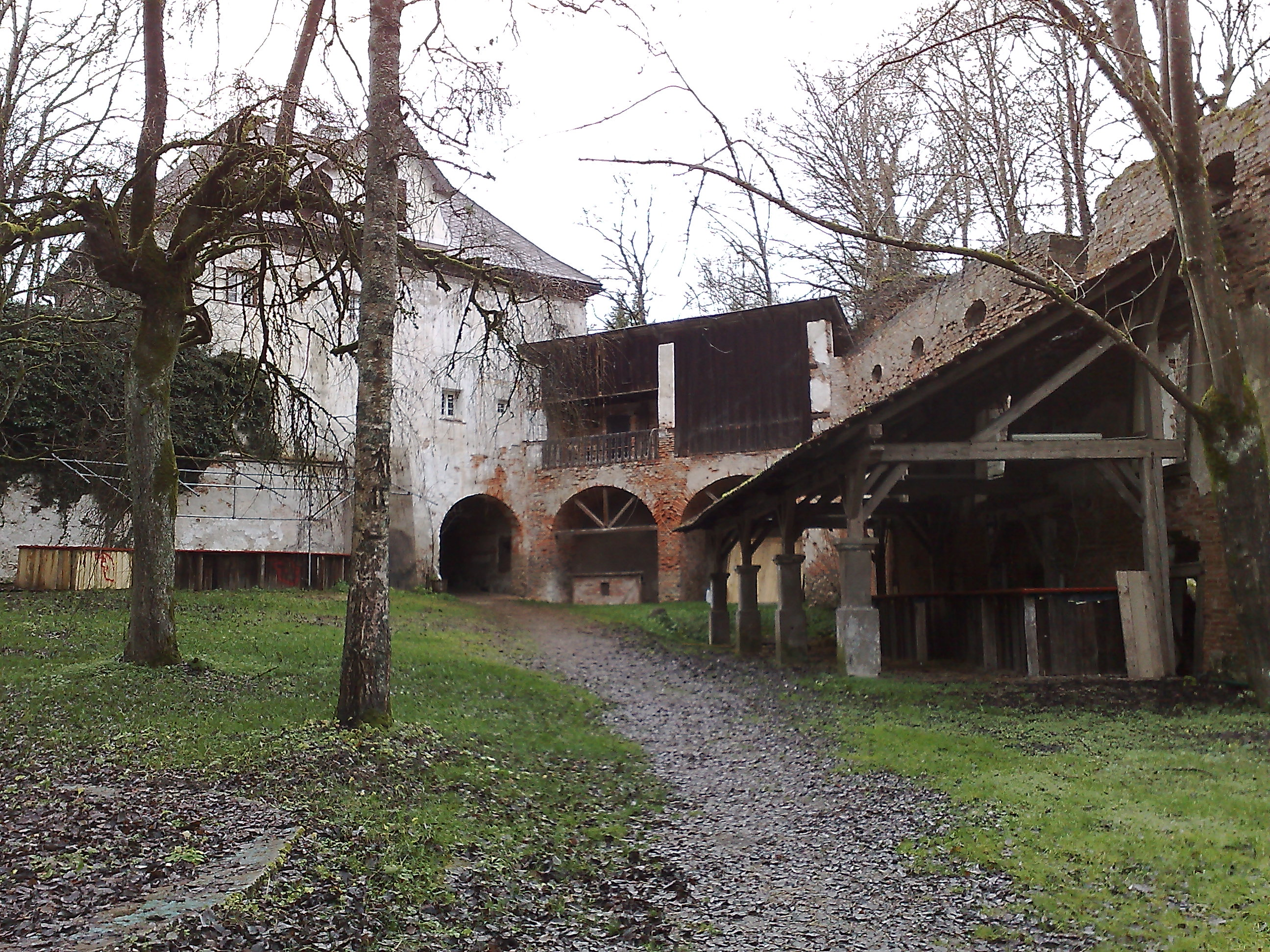
Castle Alt-Wartenburg (Oberthalheim, Austria)

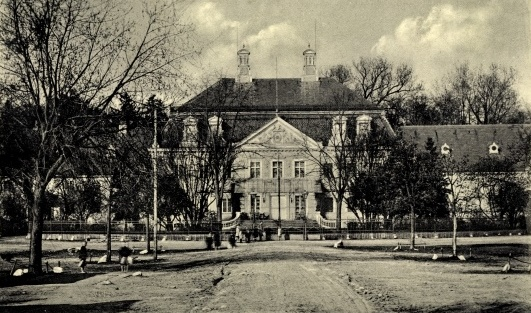
Saßleben schloss, (Oberlausitz)

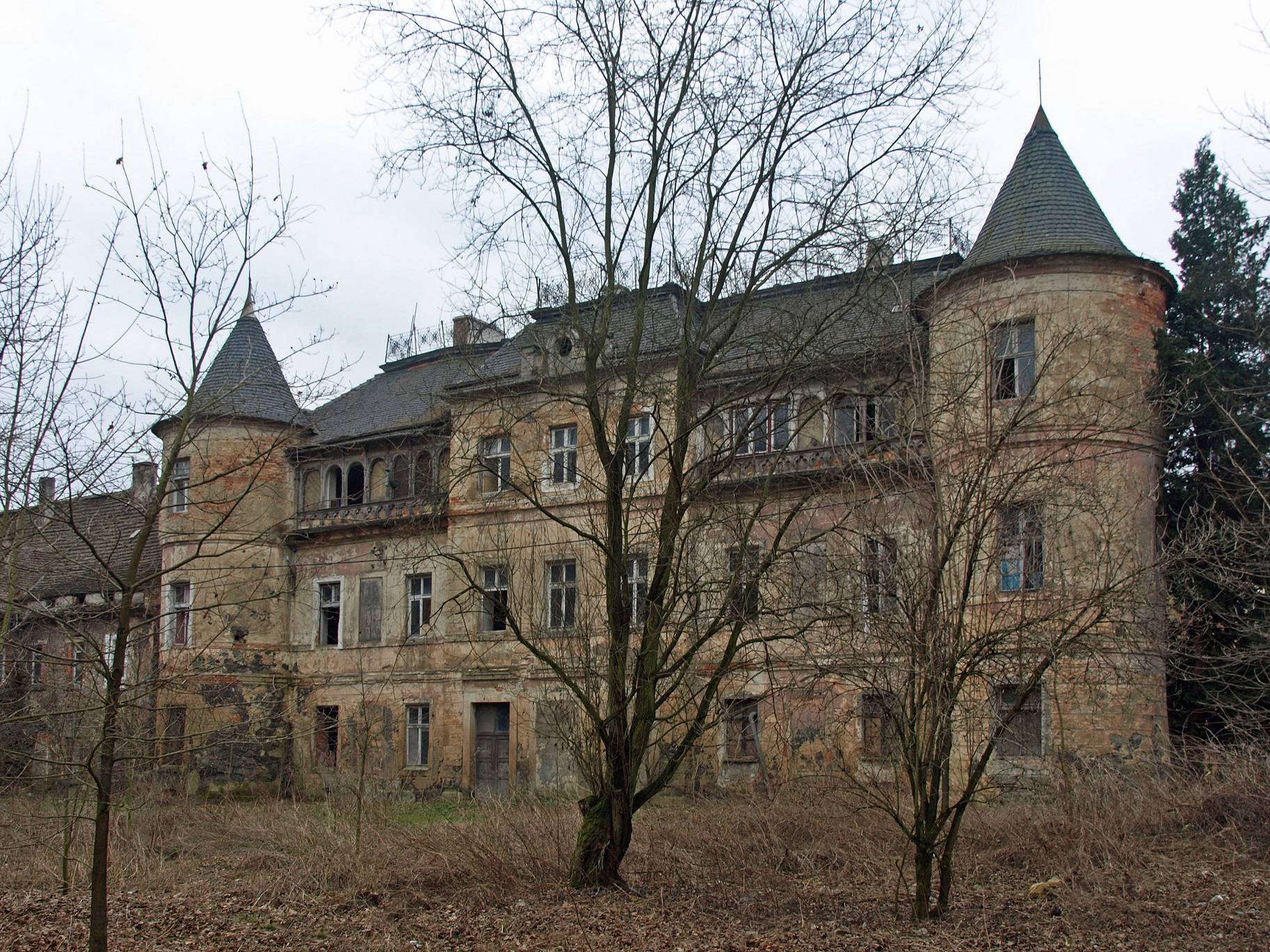
Schloss Lomnitz, owned by Count Georg zur Lippe-Weissenfeld (1894-1897), (Zgorzelec County, Poland)

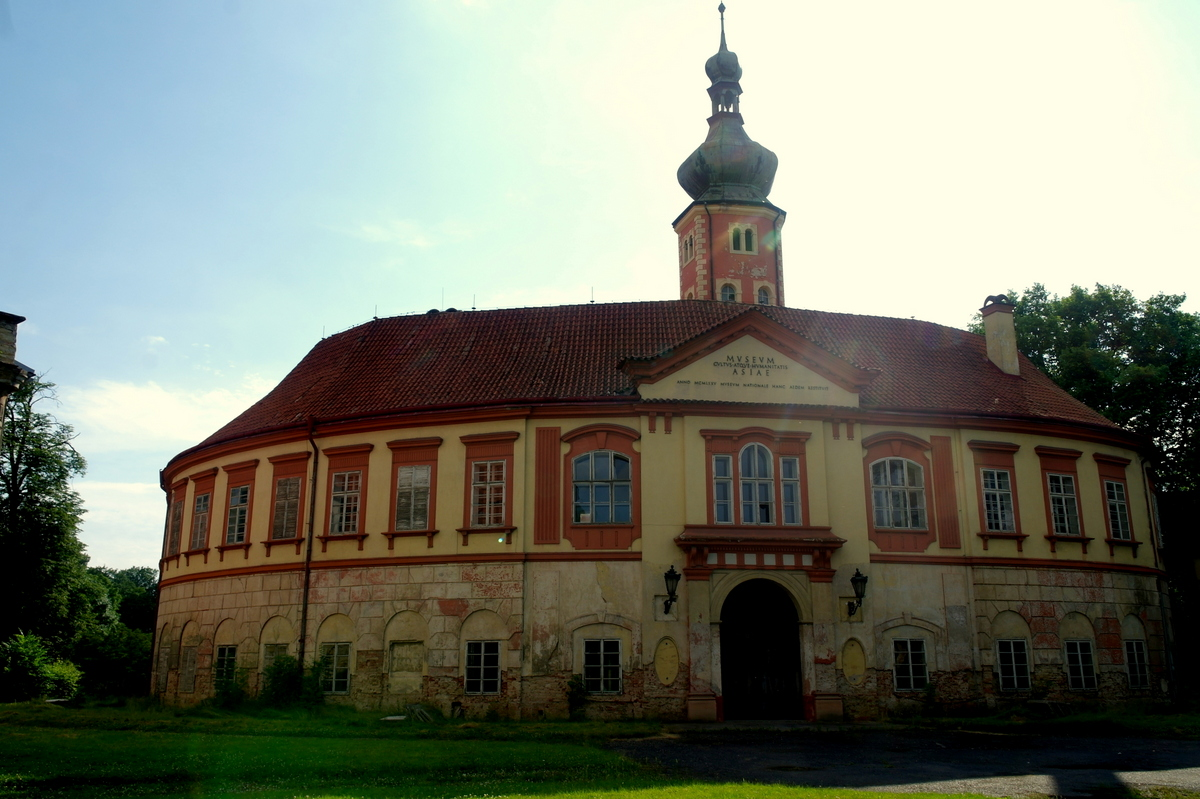
Liběchov castle, owned by Count Theodor zur Lippe-Weissenfeld (1822-1894), Mělník District, Czech Republic

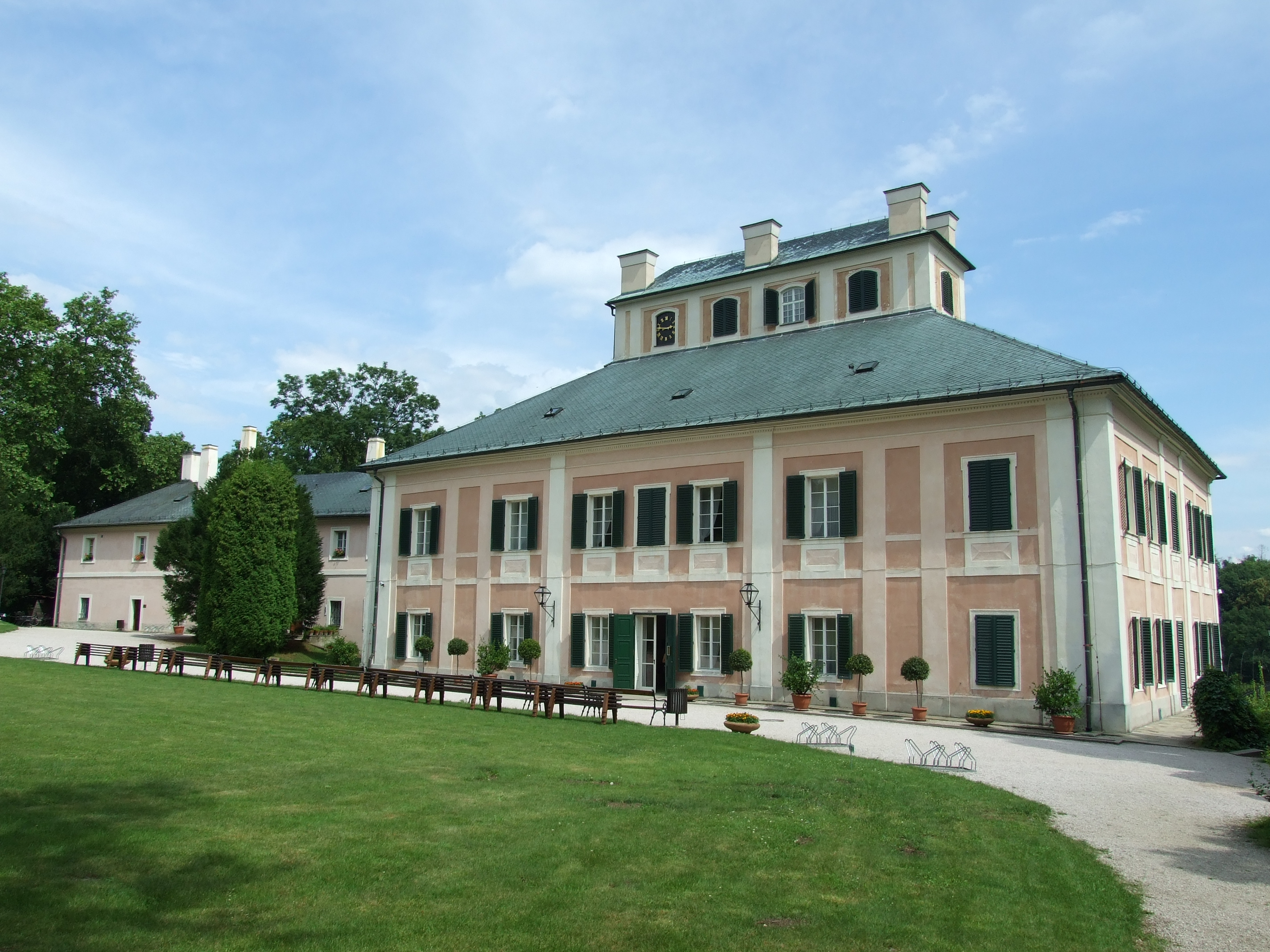
Ratibořice Castle, owned by Count Oktavio zur Lippe-Weissenfeld (1808-1885) from 1840 until 1842, Bohemia

== Notable members ==
- Prince Egmont zur Lippe-Weißenfeld (14 July 1918 – 12 March 1944); Luftwaffe night fighter flying ace
- Princess Anna of Lippe-Weißenfeld (10 February 1886 – 8 February 1980); second wife of Leopold IV, Prince of Lippe
- Princess Teresa Amalia zur Lippe-Weißenfeld (21 July 1925 – 16 July 2008); first wife of Hans Heinrich Baron von Thyssen-Bornemisza; married secondly Prince Friedrich Maximilian zu Fürstenberg (1926–1969)
- Princess Elisabeth of Lippe-Weissenfeld (b. 28 July 1957); wife of Christoph Prinz zu Schleswig-Holstein, Head of the House of Oldenburg

== See also ==
- List of consorts of Lippe
