= Biesterfeld (disambiguation) =

Biesterfeld is a subdivision of Lügde, Germany.

Biesterfeld may also refer to:

- Biesterfeld (company), a company of Germany

== People with the surname ==
- Yvonne Cormeau or Beatrice Yvonne Biesterfeld (1909–1997), World War II heroine

== See also ==
- Lippe-Biesterfeld family
