= Frederick Charles Augustus, Count of Lippe =

Frederick Charles Augustus
- Count of Lippe
- Born: 20 January 1706; Biesterfeld
- Died: 31 July 1781 (aged 75); Friedrichsruh
- Noble family: Lippe-Biesterfeld
- Spouse: Countess Barbara Eleonore of Solms-Baruth
- Father: Rudolf Ferdinand of Lippe-Sternberg-Schwalenberg
- Mother: Louise Juliane of Kunowitz

Count Frederick Charles Augustus of Lippe-Biesterfeld (20 January 1706 in Biesterfeld – 31 July 1781 in Friedrichsruh) was a Count of Lippe and Lord of Lippe-Biesterfeld, Sternberg, and Schwalenberg and a Knight of the Order of the Red Eagle.

He was the eldest son of Rudolf Ferdinand of Lippe-Sternberg-Schwalenberg (17 March 1671 – 12 July 1736) and Louise Juliane of Kunowitz (21 August 1671 – 21 October 1754) and the grandson of Count Jobst Herman of Lippe-Biesterfeld.

== Life ==
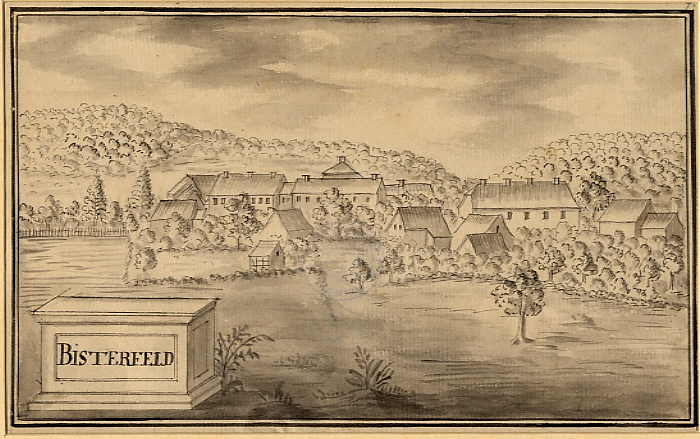
Biesterfeld estate in 1764

Charles Frederick Augustus was the last Lord of Biesterfeld. During his reign, he had the manor's brewery moved from Schwalenberg to Biestereld and added a distillery, investing 6000 taler in this endeavor.

In 1763, he constructed a hunting lodge in the Sachsenwald forest, near Hamburg, named Friedrichsruh after himself. The nearby village was later renamed after the hunting lodge. However, the hunting lodge was demolished in 1859 to make room for a guest house. Otto von Bismarck was granted the Sachsenwald as a gratification for the foundation of the German Empire in 1871. He expanded the guest house to a castle, which was destroyed during World War II. The new manor house that took its place is still named Friedrichsruh Castle and is home to the current Prince Bismarck.

The manor house and farm at Biesterfeld were demolished around 1820.

== Marriage and issue ==
Count Charles Frederick Augustus married on 7 May 1732 with Countess Barbara Eleonore of Solms-Baruth (30 October 1707 – 16 June 1744). They had the following children:

- Wilhelmine Louise Constantine (15 June 1733 – 18 February 1766)

married Count Seyfried of Promnitz (1734-1760), the son of Count Erdmann II of Promnitz
married secondly Count John Christian of Solms-Baruth (1733-1800)

- Simon Rudolph Ferdinand (6 October 1734 – 23 May 1739)
- Charles Ernest Casimir (2 November 1735 – 19 November 1810)

married Countess Ferdinande of Bentheim-Tecklenburg (1734-1779)

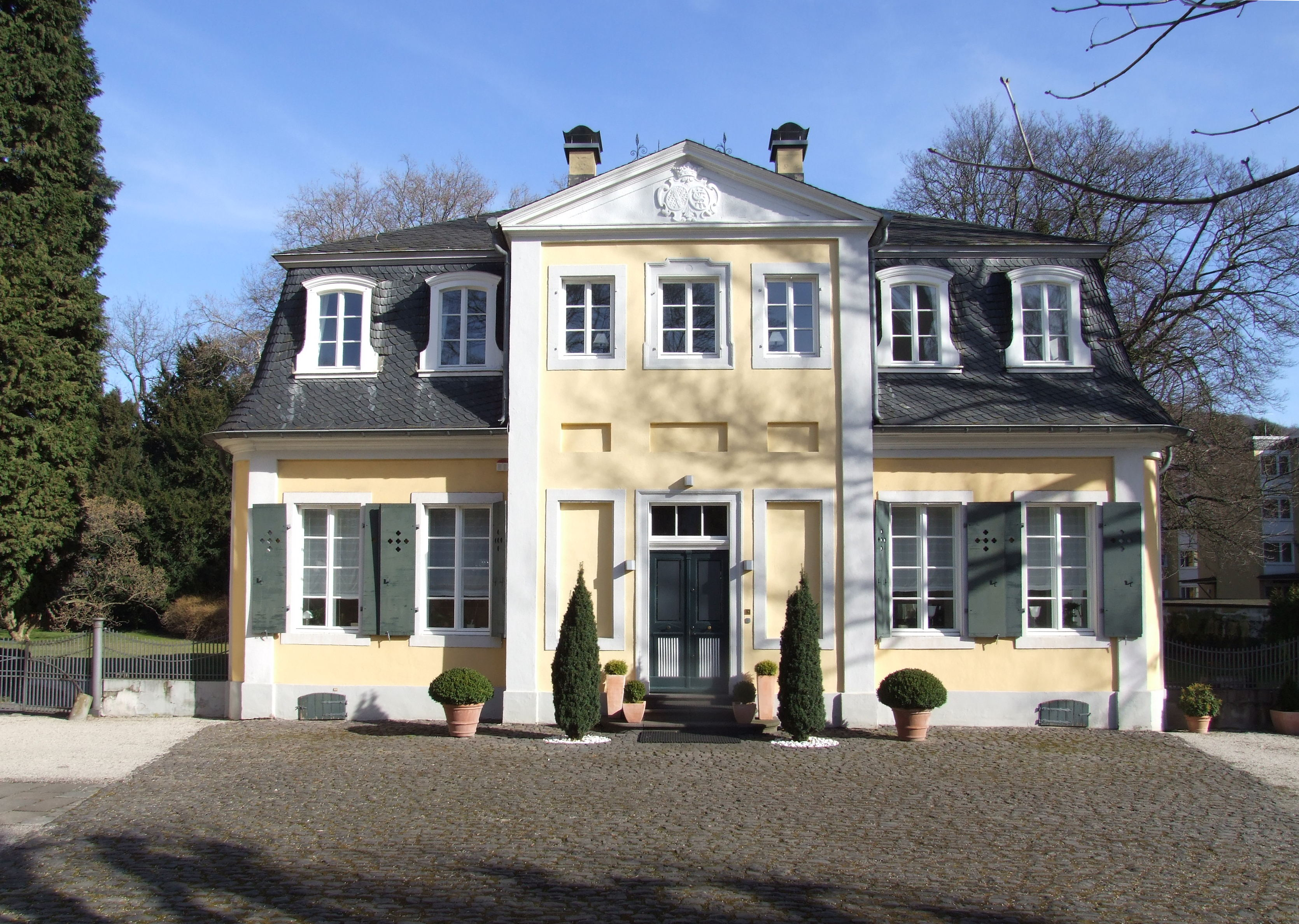
- Lippe House at Oberkassel, Bonn
  Frederick William (25 January 1737 – July 31, 1803)

married Elisabeth Johanna, Edle von Meinertzhagen (1752-1811) who inherited a small manor house at Oberkassel, Bonn, where the couple moved in 1770, and which would become the home to the Lippe-Biesterfeld family for the following 209 years

- Marie Wilhelmine Henriette (5 December 1740 – 19 April 1741)
- Henry Louis (21 April 1743 – 16 September 1794)

married Elisabeth Kellner (1765-1794), who was made Countess of Lippe-Falkenflucht in 1790

- Marie Barbara Eleonore (June 16, 1744 – June 16, 1776)

married Count William of Schaumburg-Lippe (1724-1777)

- Ferdinand John Benjamin (June 16, 1744 – April 23, 1772)

married Countess Wilhelmine of Schönburg-Lichtenstein (1746-1819)

== Ancestry ==
Ancestors of Frederick Charles Augustus, Count of Lippe

16. Simon VI, Count of Lippe
8. Simon VII, Count of Lippe
17. Elisabeth, Countess of Schauenburg and Holstein-Pinneberg
4. Jobst Herman, Count of Lippe-Biesterfeld
18. Christian, Count of Waldeck-Wildungen
9. Maria Magdalena, Countess of Waldeck
19. Elisabeth, Countess of Nassau-Siegen
2. Rudolph Ferdinand, Count of Lippe-Biesterfeld
20. Louis II, Count of Sayn-Wittgenstein-Wittgenstein
10. John VIII, Count of Sayn-Wittgenstein-Hohenstein
21. Elisabeth Juliana, Countess of Solms-Braunfels
5. Countess Elisabeth Juliane of Sayn-Wittgenstein-Hohenstein
22. Christian, Count of Waldeck-Wildungen (= 18)
11. Anna Augusta, Countess of Waldeck
23. Elisabeth, Countess of Nassau-Siegen (= 19)
1. Charles Frederick Augustus, Count of Lippe
24. Jan Jetřich of Kunovic
12. Jan Bernard of Kunovic
25. Magdalene, Countess Hardegg
6. Johann Dietrich, Count of Kunowitz
26. Jiří, Count of Wrbna and Bruntál
13. Anna Eliška, Countess of Wrbna and Bruntál
27. Elisabeth of Eitzing
3. Juliane Louise, Countess of Kunowitz
28. Simon VI, Count of Lippe (= 16)
14. Otto, Count of Lippe-Brake
29. Elisabeth, Countess of Schauenburg and Holstein-Pinneberg (= 17)
7. Dorothea, Countess of Lippe-Brake
30. George, Count of Nassau-Dillenburg
15. Margaretha, Countess of Nassau-Dillenburg
31. Amalie, Countess of Sayn-Wittgenstein
