= Jobst Herman =

Jobst Herman may refer to:

- Jobst Herman, Count of Schaumburg (1593–1635), member of the House of Schaumburg
- Jobst Herman, Count of Lippe (1625–1678), titular Count of Lippe, Sternberg and Schwalenberg
