= Frederick Adolf =

Frederick Adolf, Friedrich Adolf or Frederick Adolphus may refer to:

- Frederick Adolphus, Count of Lippe-Detmold (1667–1718)
- Prince Frederick Adolf, Duke of Östergötland (1750–1803)
- Friedrich, Prince of Waldeck and Pyrmont (1865–1946)
- Frederick William Adolf, Prince of Nassau-Siegen (1680–1722)
