= Baruth =

Baruth may refer to

- Baruth/Mark, town in Brandenburg, Germany
- Baruth bei Bautzen, village in Saxony, Germany
- Jack Baruth (born 1971), American automotive journalist and race car driver
- Philip Baruth (born 1962), American politician, novelist and biographer
