= Malschwitz =

Malschwitz Malešecy
- Municipality
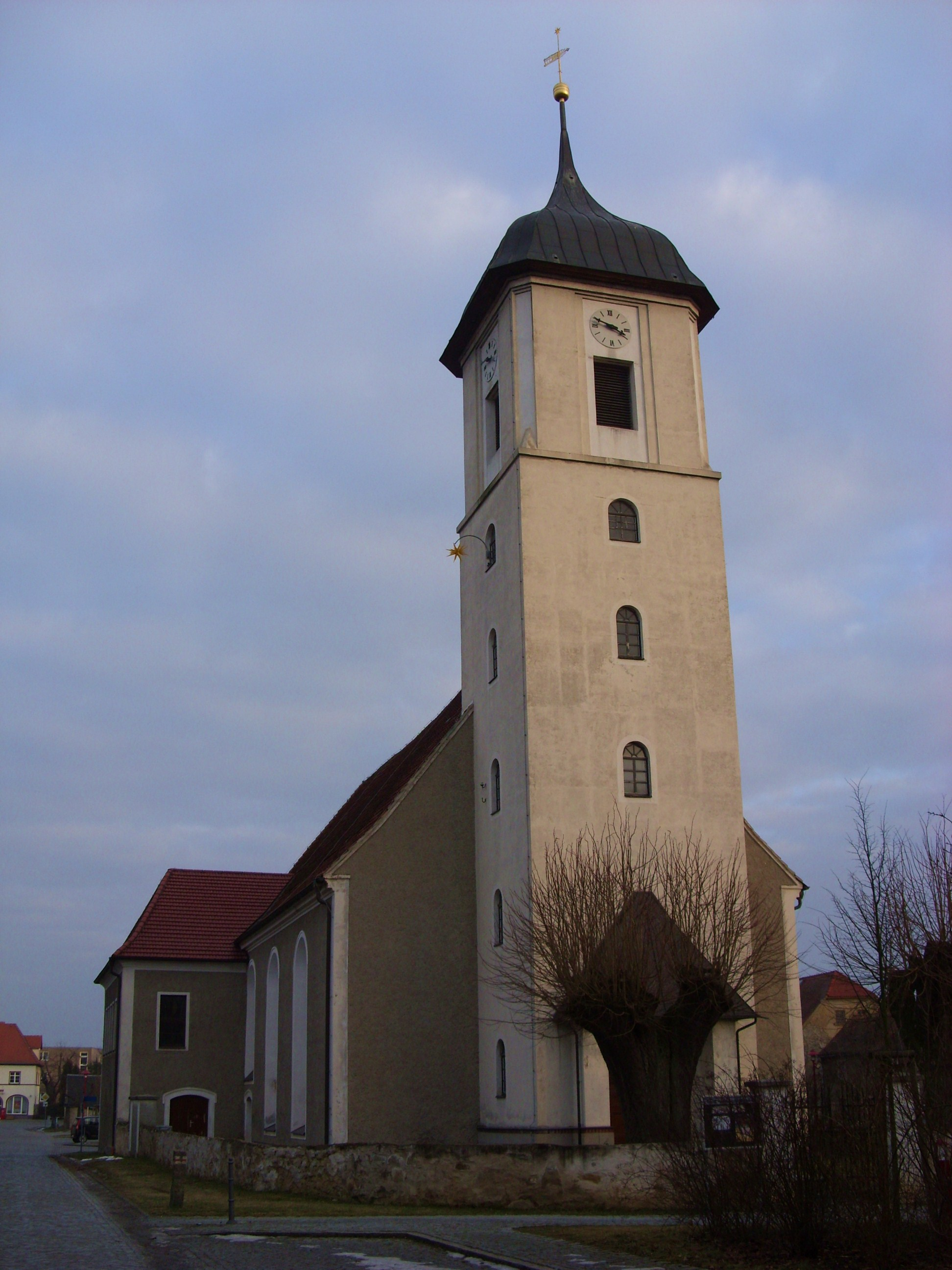
- Malschwitz Church

- Coat of arms

- Location of Malschwitz; Malešecy within Bautzen district
- Interactive map of Malschwitz; Malešecy
- Location within Germany Location within Saxony
- Coordinates: 51°14′N 14°31′E
- Country: Germany
- State: Saxony
- District: Bautzen
- Subdivisions: 14

Government
  - Mayor (2022–29): Matthias Seidel (CDU)

Area
  - Total: 93.27 km^{2} (36.01 sq mi)
- Elevation: 150 m (490 ft)

Population (2025-12-31)
  - Total: 4,735
  - Density: 50.77/km^{2} (131.5/sq mi)
- Time zone: UTC+01:00 (CET)
  - Summer (DST): UTC+02:00 (CEST)
- Postal codes: 02694
- Dialling codes: 035932
- Vehicle registration: BZ, BIW, HY, KM
- Website: www.malschwitz.de

Malschwitz (German, pronounced [ˈmalʃvɪts]) or Malešecy (Upper Sorbian) is a municipality in the east of Saxony, Germany. It belongs to the district of Bautzen and lies 6 km northeast of the eponymous city.

The municipality is part of the recognized Sorbian settlement area in Saxony. Upper Sorbian has an official status next to German, all villages bear names in both languages.

== Geography ==
The municipality is situated in the flatland in the Upper Lusatian plain, south of the so-called Lusatian Lake District. The villages of Halbendorf, Lömischau, Lieske and Neudorf lie along the river Spree.

Several villages belong to the municipality; names given in German and Upper Sorbian:

- Malschwitz/Malešecy
- Pließkowitz/Plusnikecy
- Briesing/Brězynka
- Niedergurig/Delnja Hórka
- Doberschütz/Dobrošecy
- Kleinbautzen/Budyšink
- Preititz/Přiwćicy
- Cannewitz/Skanecy
- Rackel/Rakojdy
- Baruth bei Bautzen/Bart
- Brießnitz/Brězecy
- Dubrauke/Dubrawka
- Buchwalde/Bukojna
- Gleina/Hlina
- Brösa/Brězyna
- Guttau/Hućina
- Halbendorf/Spree / Połpica
- Kleinsaubernitz/Zubornička
- Lieske/Lěskej
- Lömischau/Lemišow
- Neudorf/Spree / Nowa Wjes/Sprjewja
- Ruhethal/Wotpočink
- Wartha/Stróža

== Publications ==
- Trudla Malinkowa/Weldon Mersiovsky (ed.): Malschwitz. Malešecy. A Wendish Village in Lusatia. Serbin 2018, ISBN 978-1-944891-52-7
