= Simon Louis, Count of Lippe =

- Born: 14 March 1610; Brake Castle
- Died: 8 August 1636 (aged 26); Detmold
- Noble family: House of Lippe
- Spouse: Catherine of Waldeck-Wildungen
- Issue: Simon Philip, Count of Lippe
- Father: Simon VII, Count of Lippe
- Mother: Anna Catherine of Nassau-Wiesbaden

Simon Louis, Count of Lippe (14 March 1610 at Brake Castle – 8 August 1636 in Detmold), was Count of Lippe-Detmold from 1627 until his death.

== Life ==
He was the second eldest son of Count Simon VII of Lippe and his first wife Anna Catherine of Nassau-Wiesbaden.

When his father died in 1627, Simon Louis was still underage. His step-grandfather, Count Christian of Waldeck-Wildungen was selected as his regent and guardian. His paternal uncle, Count Otto of Lippe-Brake was unavailable, due to the strained relationship between Lippe-Detmold and Lippe-Brake. His maternal uncle, John Louis of Nassau-Hadamar, was not asked because he was a Catholic.

As was usual among members of his class, Simon Louis made a Grand Tour. His tour started in 1627 and brought him to Prague, France, England and the Netherlands. After he returned to Detmold in 1631, he applied to Emperor Ferdinand II to be declared of age early.

Influenced by his chancellor Christoph Deichmann, Simon Louis gradually moved away from his father's cautious policy of neutrality and approached Sweden. This brought him into conflict with the imperial troops. The other side did no spare Lippe either. The Swedes demanded food supplies and the imperial troops demanded money. In 1634, Schwalenberg Castle was attacked and looted and in 1636, the same happened to Varenholz Castle.

Simon Louis died of smallpox at the age of 26, on 8 August 1636 in Detmold. He was succeeded as Count of Lippe-Detmold by his eldest son, Simon Philip. Since Simon Philip was still a minor, Count Christian of Waldeck was appointed as regent again.

== Marriage and issue ==
On 19 June 1631, Simon Louis married Countess Catherine of Waldeck (1612-1649), the daughter of his guardian Count Christian of Waldeck-Wildungen, and also a younger sister of his stepmother, Maria Magdalena (1606-1671). Simon Louis and Catherine had three sons:

- Simon Philip (1632-1650)
- Herman Otto (1633-1646)
- Christian Louis (1636-1646)

Simon Louis, Count of Lippe House of Lippe Born: 14 March 1610 Died: 8 August 1636
Preceded by Simon VII	Count of Lippe-Detmold; 1627–1636	Succeeded by Simon Philip
