= Simon Henry, Count of Lippe =

Count of Lippe-Detmold (1649–1697)

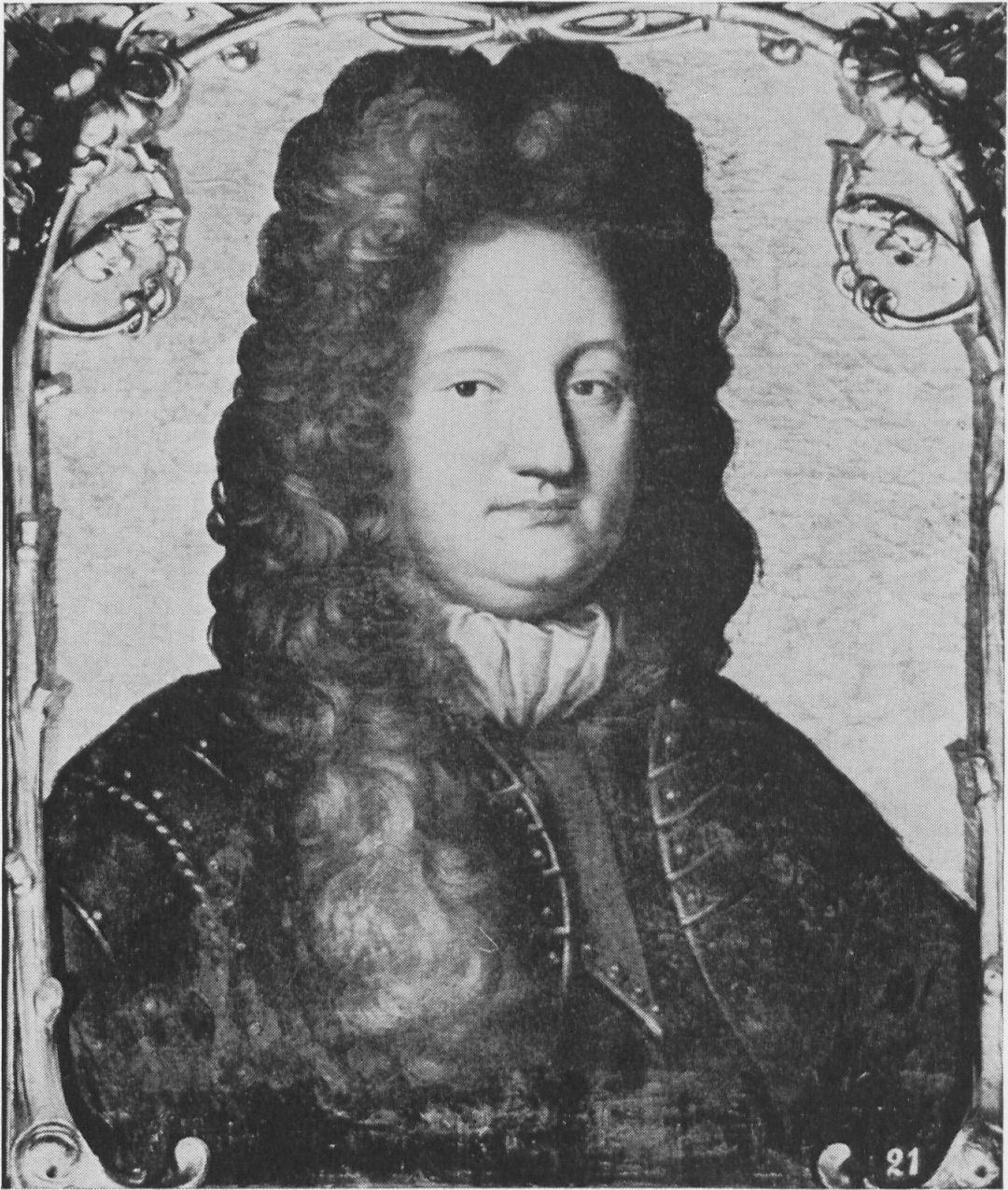
- Born: 13 March 1639; Sternberg
- Died: 2 May 1697 (aged 58); Detmold
- Noble family: House of Lippe
- Spouse: Amalia of Dohna-Vianen
- Father: Herman Adolph, Count of Lippe
- Mother: Ernestine of Ysenburg-Büdingen-Birstein

Simon Henry, Count of Lippe (13 March 1649 in Sternberg – 2 May 1697 in Detmold) was a ruling Count of Lippe-Detmold.

== Life ==
Simon Henry was the eldest son of Herman Adolph, Count of Lippe and his first wife Countess Ernestine of Ysenburg-Büdingen-Birstein.

In 1665, he became co-ruler with his father; in 1666, his father died and Simon Henry inherited Principality of Lippe.

Between 1683 and 1685, he replaced the Jagdschloss his father had built near today's Augustdorf by a series of buildings arranged symmetrically around a Cour d'honneur. The complex was designed in a Palladian classicist style. The sober main building had two floors and a mezzanine and was flanked by single-story stables arranged symmetrically around a cour d'honeur. The stables housed a stud farm dating back to the 16th century. The complex was set on fire on 11 July 1945 by prisoners of war, and was demolished in 1947.

Simon Henry died on 2 May 1697 in Detmold. His widow retreated to Varenholz Castle, where she died on 11 March 1700.

== Marriage and issue ==
On 15 September 1666, Simon Henry married in The Hague with Baroness Amalia of Dohna-Vianen, Burgravine of Utrecht, heiress of Vianen and Ameide (2 February 1644 in The Hague – 11 March 1700), a daughter of General Christian Albert of Dohna. They had the following children:

- Frederick Adolph (2 September 1667 at Detmold Castle – 18 July 1718 in Detmold), Count of Lippe-Detmold
- Ferdinand Christian (13 September 1668 in Detmold – 18 October 1724 in Samrodt), Lord of Samrodt
- Sophie Henriette (23 October 1669 in Detmold – 25 October 1669 ibid)
- Henry Ernest (24 January 1671 in Detmold – 1 October 1691 in Győr)
- Joanna Sophie (29 June 1672 in Detmold – November 1675, ibid)
- Albertine (24 August 1673 in Detmold – 29 December 1673, ibid)
- Charlotte Albertine (14 October 1674 in Detmold – 13 July 1740 in Wetzlar) - married on 8 February 1707 in Schaumburg with Count Charles of Wied-Runkel (21 October 1684 – 21 June 1764)
- William Simon (5 January 1676 in Detmold – 21 January 1681, ibid)
- Theodor Augustus (28 July 1677 in Detmold – 25 October 1677 ibid)
- Christopher Louis (3 April 1679 in Detmold – 18 May 1747 ibid)
- Theodore Emil (20 September 1680 in Detmold – 11 September 1709), fell during the Battle of Malplaquet
- Simon Charles (23 March 1682 in Detmold – 20 September 1703), fell during the First Battle of Höchstädt
- Florentine Sophie (8 September 1683 – 24 April 1758 in Altenkirchen im Westerwald), married on 29 August 1704 in Detmold to Count Maximilian Henry of Wied-Runkel (1 May 1681 – 19 December 1706)
- Freda Henrietta (b. and d. 13 March 1686 in Detmold)
- William Charles Dietrich (9 November 1686 Vianen – 16 May 1687 in Detmold)
- August Wolfhart (23 June 1688 in Detmold – 18 January 1739 in Varenholz)

Simon Henry, Count of Lippe House of Lippe Born: 13 March 1649 Died: 2 May 1697
Preceded by Herman Adolph	Count of Lippe-Detmold; 1666–1697	Succeeded by Frederick Adolph
