= Herman Adolph, Count of Lippe =

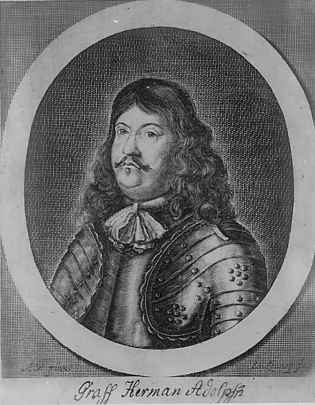
- Born: 1616
- Died: 1666 (aged 49–50)
- Noble family: House of Lippe
- Spouses: Ernestine of Ysenburg-Büdingen-Birstein; Amalia of Lippe-Brake
- Father: Simon VII, Count of Lippe
- Mother: Anna Catherine of Nassau-Wiesbaden-Idstein

Herman Adolph, Count of Lippe-Detmold (1616–1666) was a ruler of the county of Lippe.

== Life ==
He was the son Count Simon VII and his wife, Countess Anna Catherine of Nassau-Wiesbaden-Idstein (1590 -1622).

In 1659 he completed the expansion of the castle at Horn-Bad Meinberg with a splendid baroque entrance gate. The coat of arms of Herman Adolph and his wife can still be seen above this gate.

From 1663 to 1664, he fought in the 4th Austrian-Turkish war, leading a company of 140 soldiers. His soldiers returned to Lippe after the Peace of Vasvár.

== Marriage and issue ==
In 1648, he married Countess Ernestine of Ysenburg-Büdingen-Birstein (9 February 1614 – 5 December 1665) from Offenbach. They had four children:

- Simon Henry (13 March 1649 – 2 May 1697), married Burgravine Amalia of Dohna-Vianen (2 February 1645 – 11 March 1700), from The Hague
- Anna Maria (20 February 1651 – 22 July 1690)
- Ernestine Sophie (9 March 1652 – 22 January 1702)
- Joanna Elizabeth (6 August 1653 – 5 June 1690), married Count Christoper Frederick of Dohna-Lauck

After the death of Ernestine's on 5 December 1665, he married in 1666 Countess Amalia of Lippe-Brake (20 September 1629 – 19 August 1676). This marriage remained childless.

Herman Adolph, Count of Lippe House of Lippe Born: 1616 Died: 1666
Preceded by John Bernard	Count of Lippe-Detmold; 1652–1666	Succeeded by Simon Henry
