= Simon Philip, Count of Lippe =

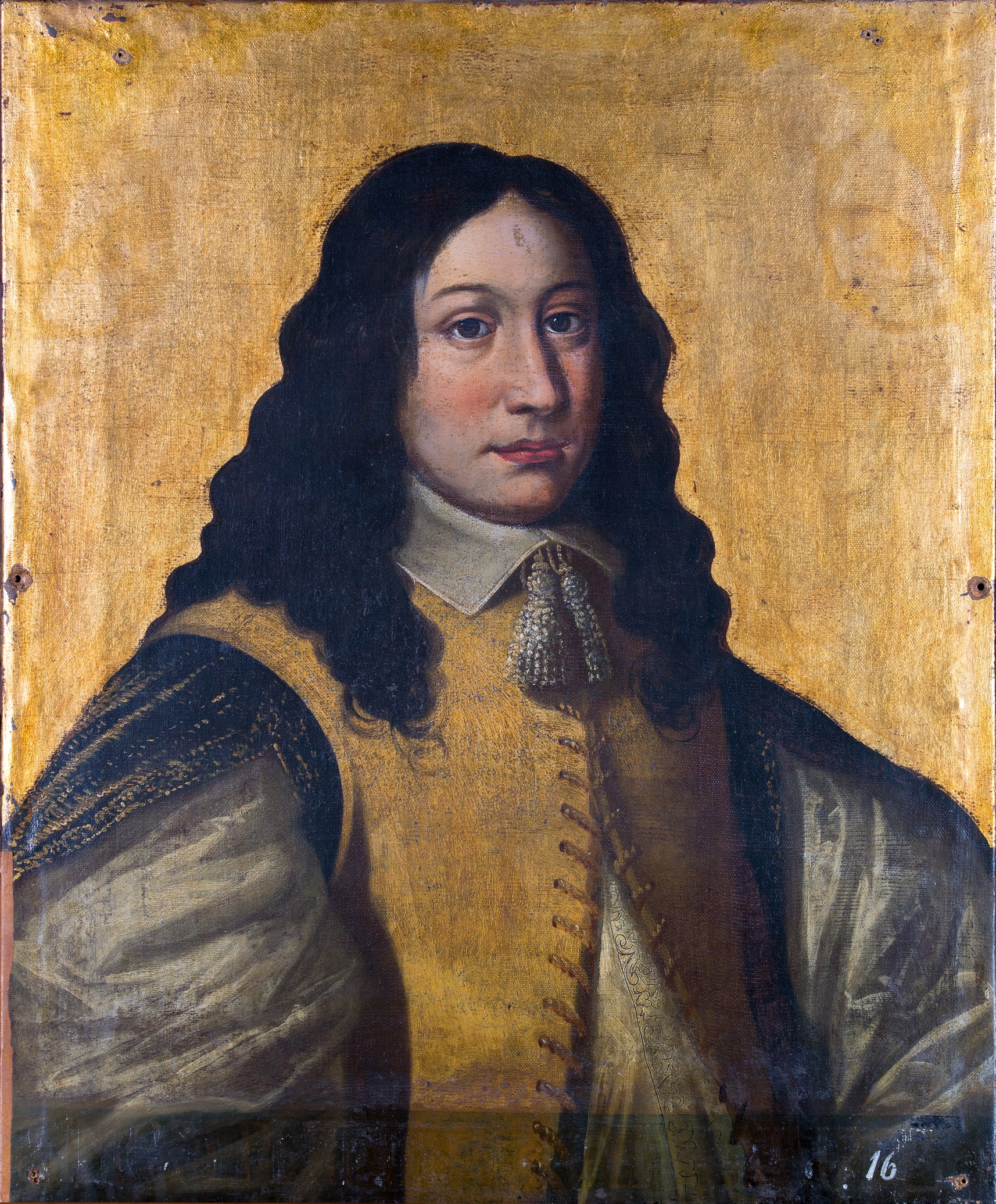
- Born: 6 April 1632; Detmold
- Died: 19 June 1650 (aged 18); Florence
- Noble family: House of Lippe
- Father: Simon Louis, Count of Lippe
- Mother: Catherine of Waldeck-Wildungen

Simon Philip, Count of Lippe (6 April 1632 in Detmold – 19 June 1650 in Florence) was a German nobleman. He was the nominal ruling Count of Lippe from 1636 until his death. As he was still a minor, his grandfather and later his mother acted as regent.

== Life ==
He was the eldest son of Count Simon Louis, Count of Lippe and his wife Countess Catherine of Waldeck-Wildungen.

Simon Philip and his younger brothers were still minors when their father died of smallpox in 1636. Their mother Catherine tried to become their guardian and regent. At the age of 24, she was still a minor herself, so she tried to have her father, Count Christian of Waldeck-Wildungen appointed as guardian and regent. Her brother-in-law, John Bernard also claimed the regency and guardianship of his nephews.

Catherine was afraid that John Bernard might want to kill his nephews and inherit Lippe himself. She contacted the troops of Hesse-Darmstadt, who happened to be quartered in Lemgo and Rinteln. In 1638, a captain from Darmstadt kidnapped the children and brought them to Lemgo and Hamelin. Later they were brought to Marburg, where Landgrave George II of Hesse-Darmstadt took them in his care. George II was their first cousin once removed, as his paternal grandmother was the sister of the princes' great-grandfather.

In 1645, George II brought them to Giessen, to protect them against the ravages of the Thirty Years' War. In Giessen, they contracted smallpox, and Simon Philip's two younger brothers died there in 1646. In the meantime, their mother had remarried to Duke Philip Louis of Schleswig-Holstein-Sonderburg-Wiesenburg, so she had become a duchess. In 1647, she had her son kidnapped again, and he returned to Detmold via a detour. In Detmold, he was engaged to the seven-year-old Countess Elisabeth Charlotte of Holzappel.

In 1649, Simon Philip began his Grand Tour. It took him to Paris, Grenoble, Rome, Milan, and Florence. In Florence, he contracted smallpox. He died there in 1650. Since he had no male heir, his uncle John Bernard inherited the county.

== Footnotes ==
Simon Philip, Count of Lippe House of Lippe Born: 6 April 1632 Died: 19 June 1650
Preceded by Simon Louis	Count of Lippe-Detmold; 1636–1650	Succeeded by John Bernard
