= Biesterfeld =

Coordinates: 51°52′22″N 9°16′28″E

Biesterfeld is currently part (Ort) of the Rischenau quarter (Ortsteil) of the city of Lügde, Germany.

== History ==
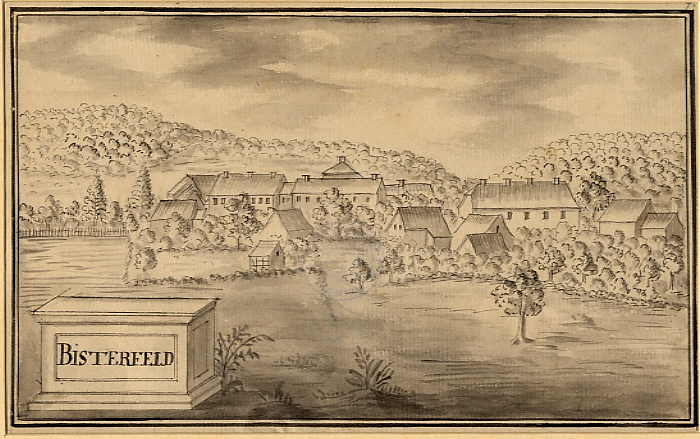
Biesterfeld estate in 1764

In the first half of the 17th century Count Simon VI of Lippe joined several failing dairy farms into one, and in 1624 passed them to the bailiff (Amtmann) of Schwalenberg. The County of Schwalenberg had partially passed to the House of Lippe in 1365, and the Biesterfeld estate was part of it.

Later Biesterfeld estate was sold to Maria Magdalena, the widow of Simon VII of Lippe. Her son Jobst Herman, Count of Lippe, built the manor of Biesterfeld around 1660 and is considered the founder of the Lippe-Biesterfeld line. Frederick Charles Augustus, Count of Lippe, moved the comital brewery from Schwalenberg to Biesterfeld in 1740.

The latter's eldest surviving son Frederick William (1737–1803) married Elisabeth Johanna, Edle von Meinertzhagen (1752–1811), who inherited a small manor house at Oberkassel, Bonn, where the couple moved in 1770, and which became the home to the Lippe-Biesterfeld family for the following 209 years. The manor house and farm at Biesterfeld were demolished around 1820.

== See also ==
- Lippe-Biesterfeld
