= Hans Hinrich Rundt =

German painter

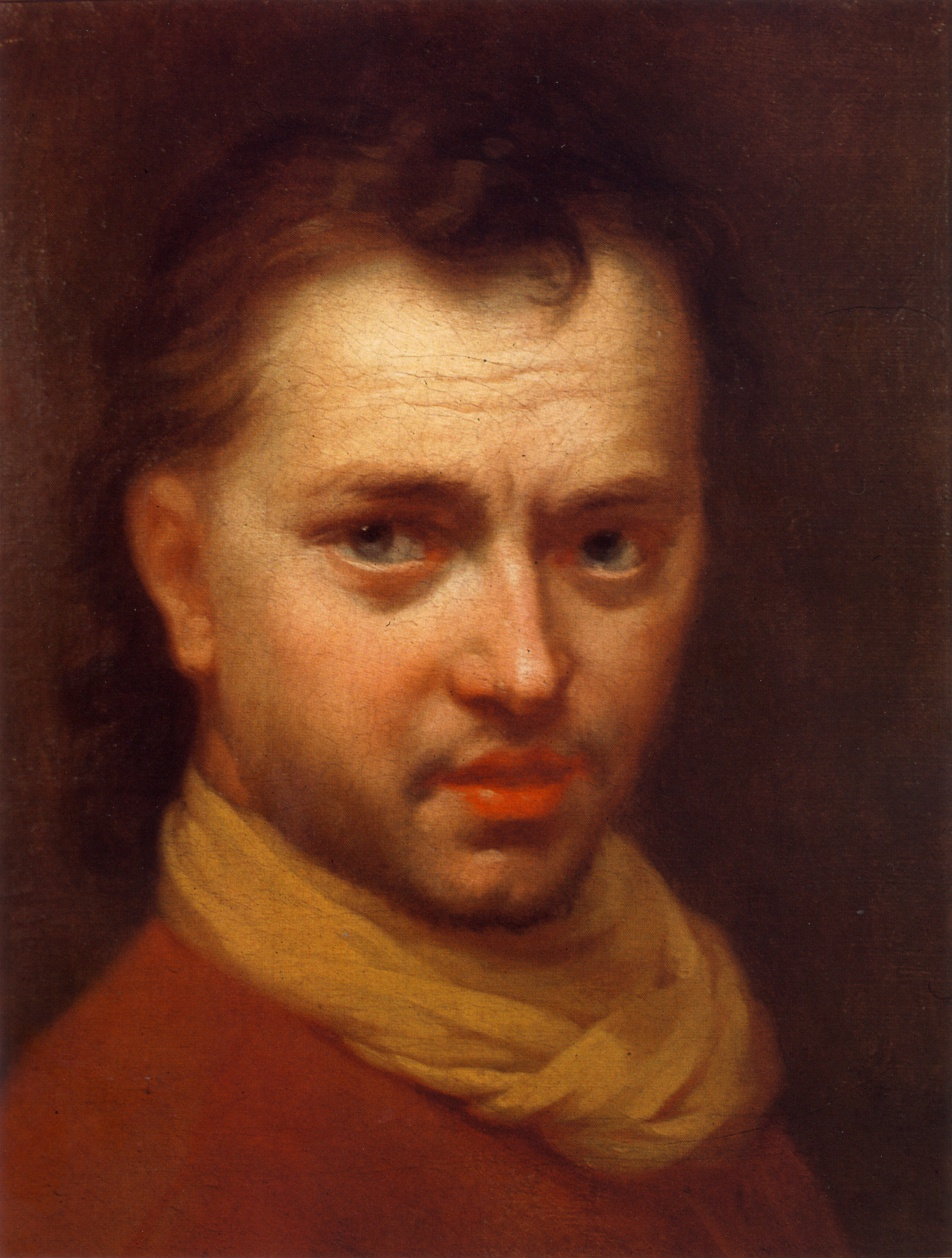
Self-portrait (1690s)

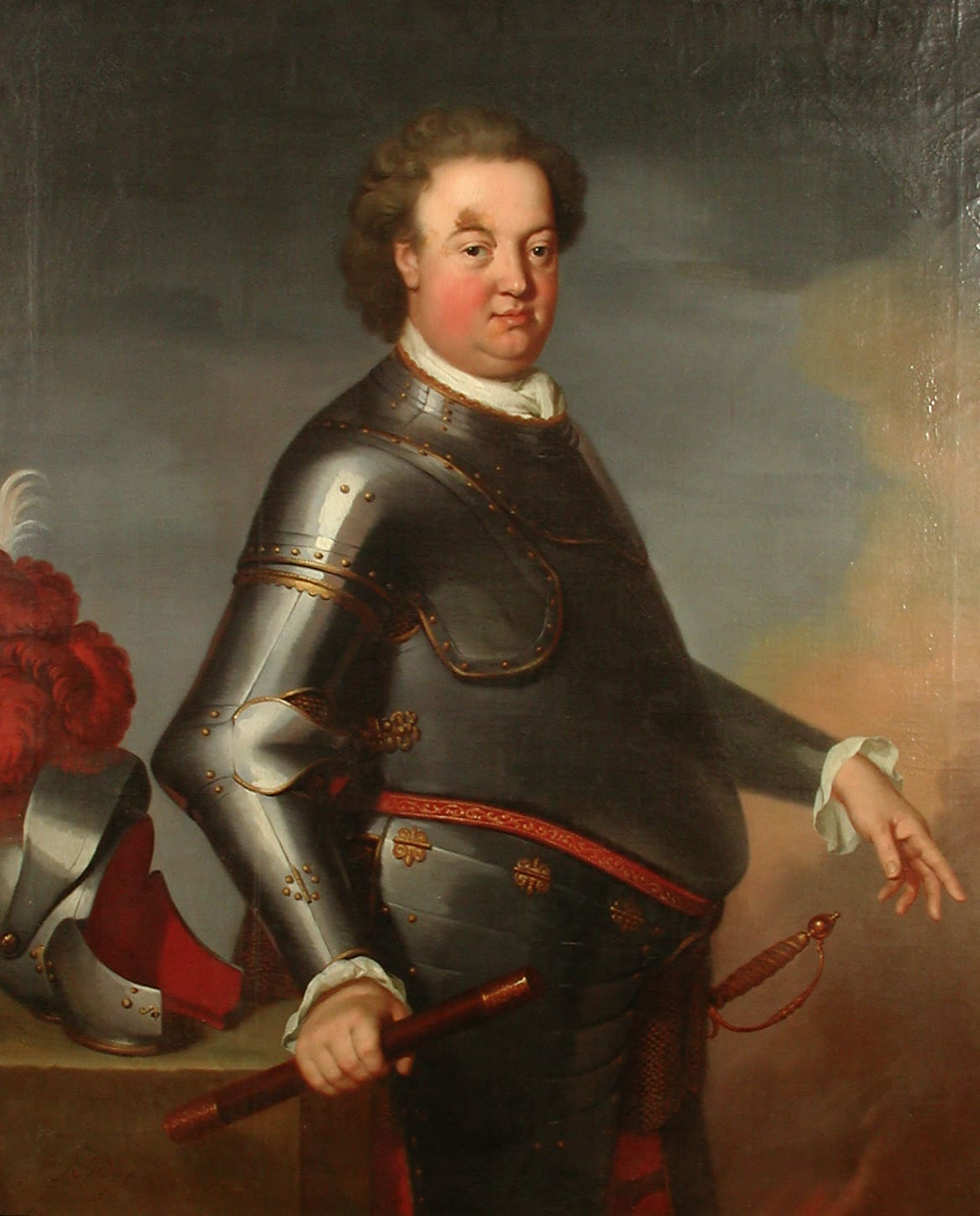
Count Frederick Adolphus (1703)

Hans Hinrich Rundt, sometimes called Johann Rundt (c. 1660 – c. 1750) was a German Baroque painter, who is known primarily through his works done for the House of Lippe.

== Life ==
The first known documents relating to Rundt's life are letters that he sent from Amsterdam in 1684. Based on those letters, he appears to have been a student of Gerard de Lairesse. In May 1687, Susanne Catharina Rundt was baptized in St. Nicholas' Church, Hamburg and, in December 1688, Gottfried Nicolaus Rundt was baptized in St. James' Church. They are presumed to be his children. In November 1692, Rundt applied to become a citizen of Hamburg and paid his fee in installments through August 1700.

His involvement with the House of Lippe can be dated from 1698 to 1720, on the basis of 112 letters, mostly addressed to Christoph Leineweber, the "Landrezeptor" (estate manager) for Count Frederick Adolphus. He began working in Lippe and commuted between Hamburg and Detmold, doing errands as well as painting.

After Leineweber's death in 1713, Rundt communicated more directly with the count, complaining about his low wages. Nevertheless, he continued to work for the family, even after the count's death, and became a Master Builder in 1720. Apparently, he never exercised his new duties and, after 1720, there is no further record of contacts with the family. After 1724, there is no more documentation at all. His death at a hospital in Hamburg is believed to have occurred around 1750.

The earliest works reliably attributed to him are engravings for the Thesauros Exoticorum by Eberhard Werner Happel (known as "Happelius") and for Viel vermehrte Moscowitische und Persianische Reisebeschreibungen by Adam Olearius, both in 1688. His first oil painting appears to have been his self-portrait. He also produced murals for the Neues Palais in 1705 and Saint James' Church. His last known painting was a portrait of someone named Johann Hanker for St. Peter's Church. Much of his work has been lost or destroyed.
