= Proschwitz =

Human settlement in Meißen, Germany

Coordinates: 51.1795°N 13.4770°E

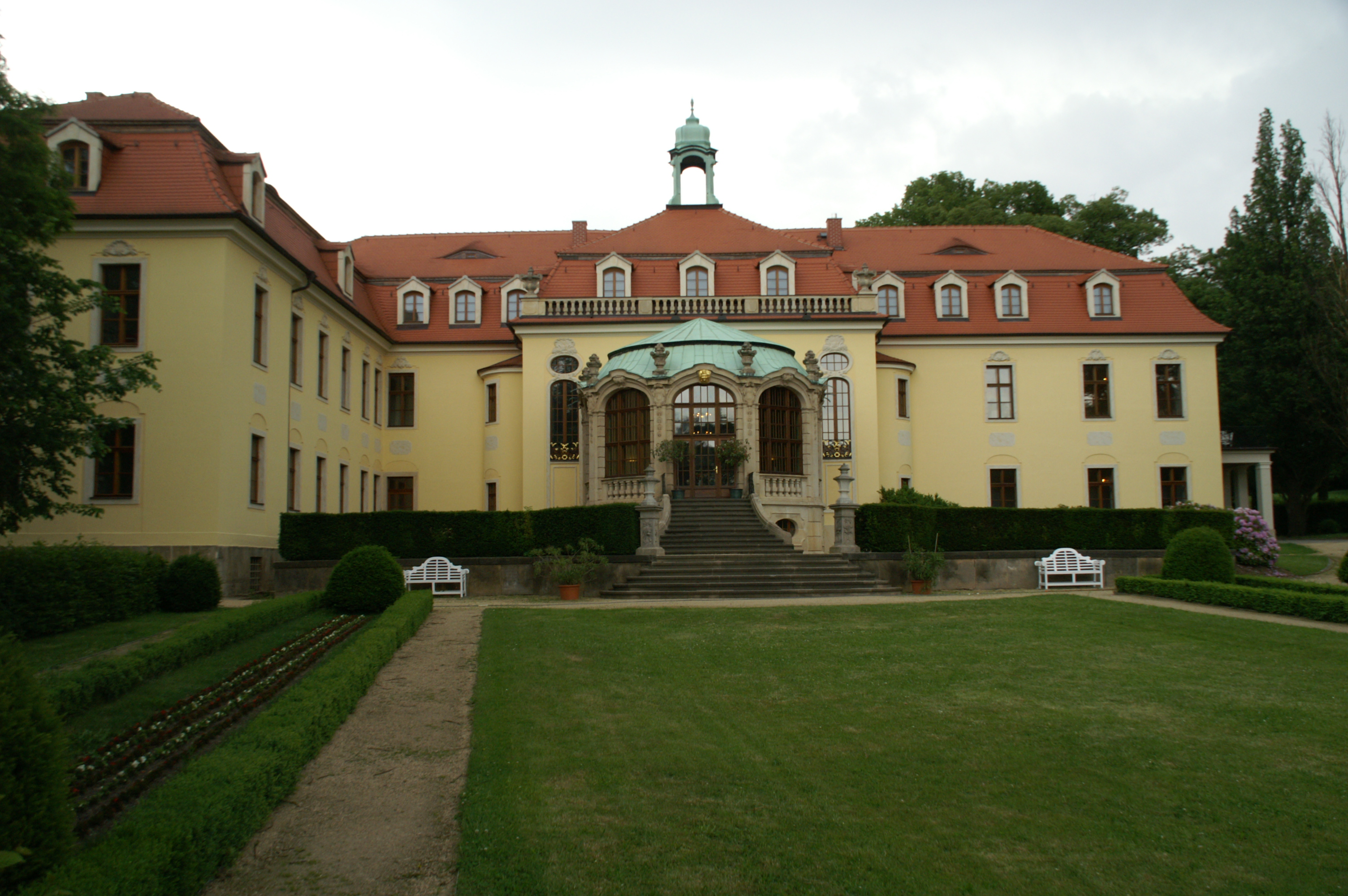
Proschwitz Castle

Proschwitz is a small village, part of the municipality of Meißen in Saxony, Germany. The nearby Proschwitz Castle is a property of Prince Georg of Lippe-Weissenfeld and is a winery. Besides wine production, the castle is open for concerts, balls, banquets, conferences and weddings. During World War II, there was an ammunition factory there.
