= John Bernard, Count of Lippe =

German noble (1613–1652)

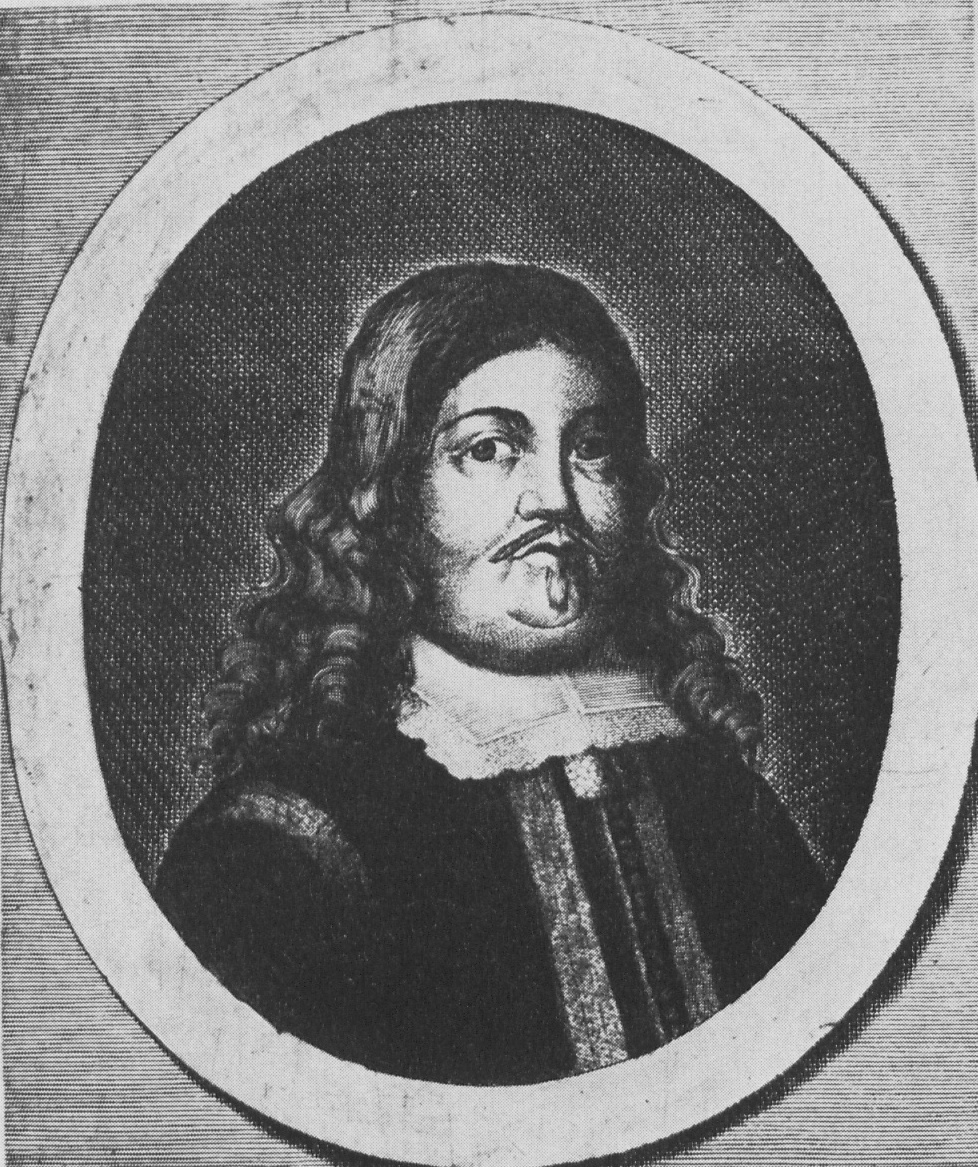
- Born: 18 October 1613
- Died: 10 June 1652 (aged 38)
- Noble family: House of Lippe
- Father: Simon VII, Count of Lippe
- Mother: Anne Catherine of Nassau-Wiesbaden-Idstein

John Bernard, Count of Lippe (18 October 1613 - 10 June 1652) was a ruling Count of Lippe-Detmold from 1650 until his death.

He was the second eldest son of Count Simon VII of Lippe and his wife Anne Catherine of Nassau-Wiesbaden-Idstein (1590-1622). After the death of his nephew Simon Philip in 1650, he inherited Lippe-Detmold.

He died childless in 1652. His younger brother Herman Adolph inherited Lippe-Detmold.

John Bernard, Count of Lippe House of Lippe Born: 1613 Died: 1652
| Preceded by Simon Philip | Count of Lippe-Detmold; 1650–1652 | Succeeded by Herman Adolph |
