= Guttau =

Guttau Hućina
- Village of Malschwitz
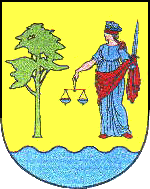
- Coat of arms
- Interactive map of Guttau; Hućina
- Location within Germany Location within Saxony
- Coordinates: 51°15′N 14°34′E
- Country: Germany
- State: Saxony
- District: Bautzen
- Municipality: Malschwitz

Area
  - Total: 41.66 km^{2} (16.09 sq mi)
- Elevation: 146 m (479 ft)

Population (2011-12-31)
  - Total: 1,581
  - Density: 37.95/km^{2} (98.29/sq mi)
- Time zone: UTC+01:00 (CET)
  - Summer (DST): UTC+02:00 (CEST)
- Postal codes: 02694
- Dialling codes: 035932
- Vehicle registration: BZ

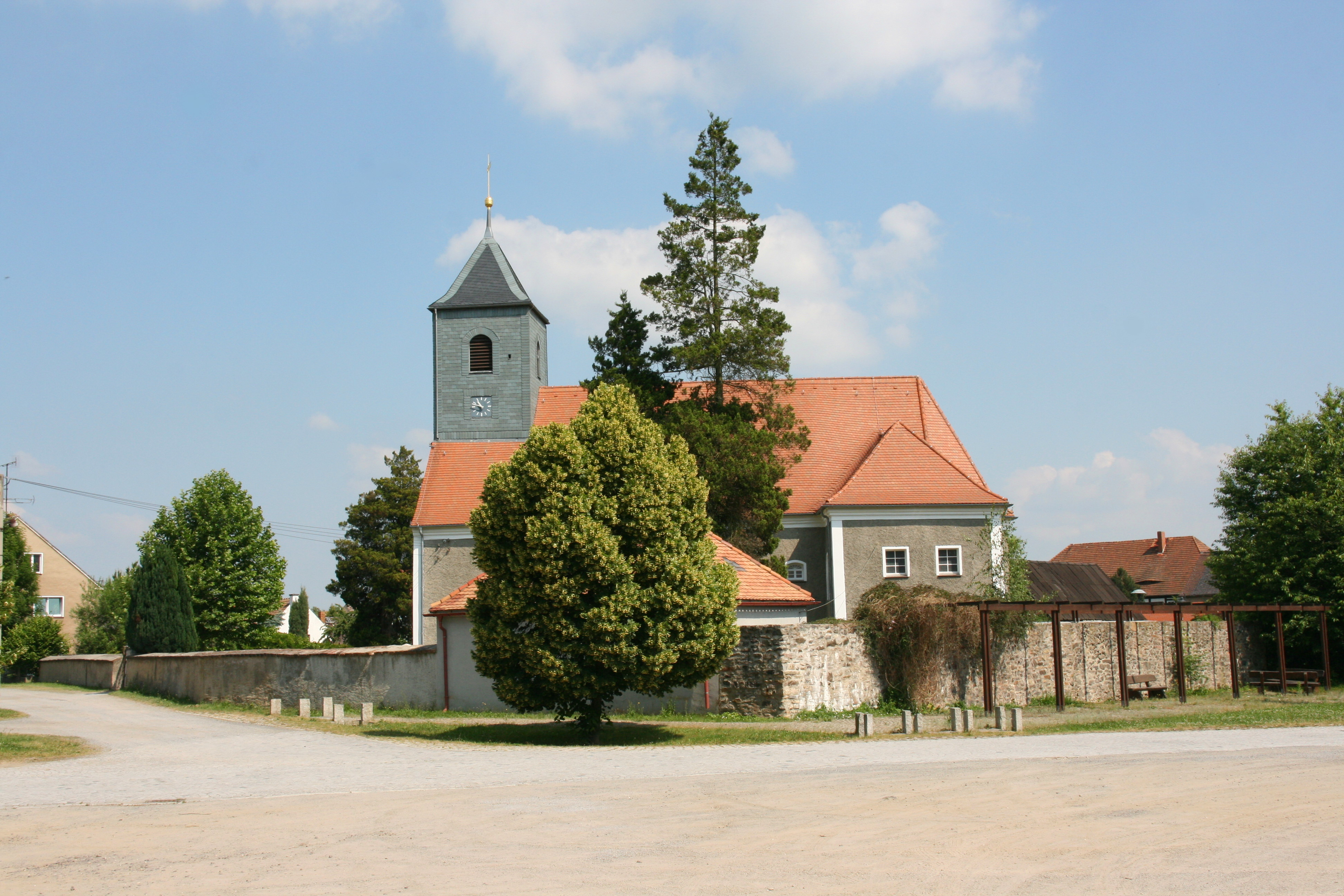
Evangelical Church in Guttau

Guttau (German, pronounced [ˈɡʊtaʊ]) or Hućina (Upper Sorbian) is a village in the east of Saxony, Germany. It is part of the municipality of Malschwitz in the district of Bautzen, and lies northeast of the town of Bautzen/Budyšin. The village is part of the bilingual Sorbian settlement area.

It is situated in the Upper Lusatian plain, south of the so-called Lusatian Lake District.

Guttau/Hućina was previously a municipality consisting of nine villages, from 1996 to 2012. That municipality was merged into Malschwitz/Malešecy on 1 January 2013.

== Former municipality ==
From 1996 to 2012, Guttau/Hućina was the name of a municipality (Gemeinde/Gmejny), with nine villages included. Their names are listed below in German and Upper Sorbian.

- Brösa/Brězyna
- Guttau/Hućina
- Halbendorf/Spree / Połpica
- Kleinsaubernitz/Zubornička
- Lieske/Lěskej
- Lömischau/Lemišow
- Neudorf/Spree / Nowa Wjes/Sprjewja
- Ruhethal/Wotpočink
- Wartha/Stróža

Together, the areas of Guttau and Malschwitz formed the Verwaltungsgemeinschaft Malschwitz until they merged as one municipality, named Malschwitz/Malešecy, from 2013 onwards.
