= Frederick Adolphus, Count of Lippe-Detmold =

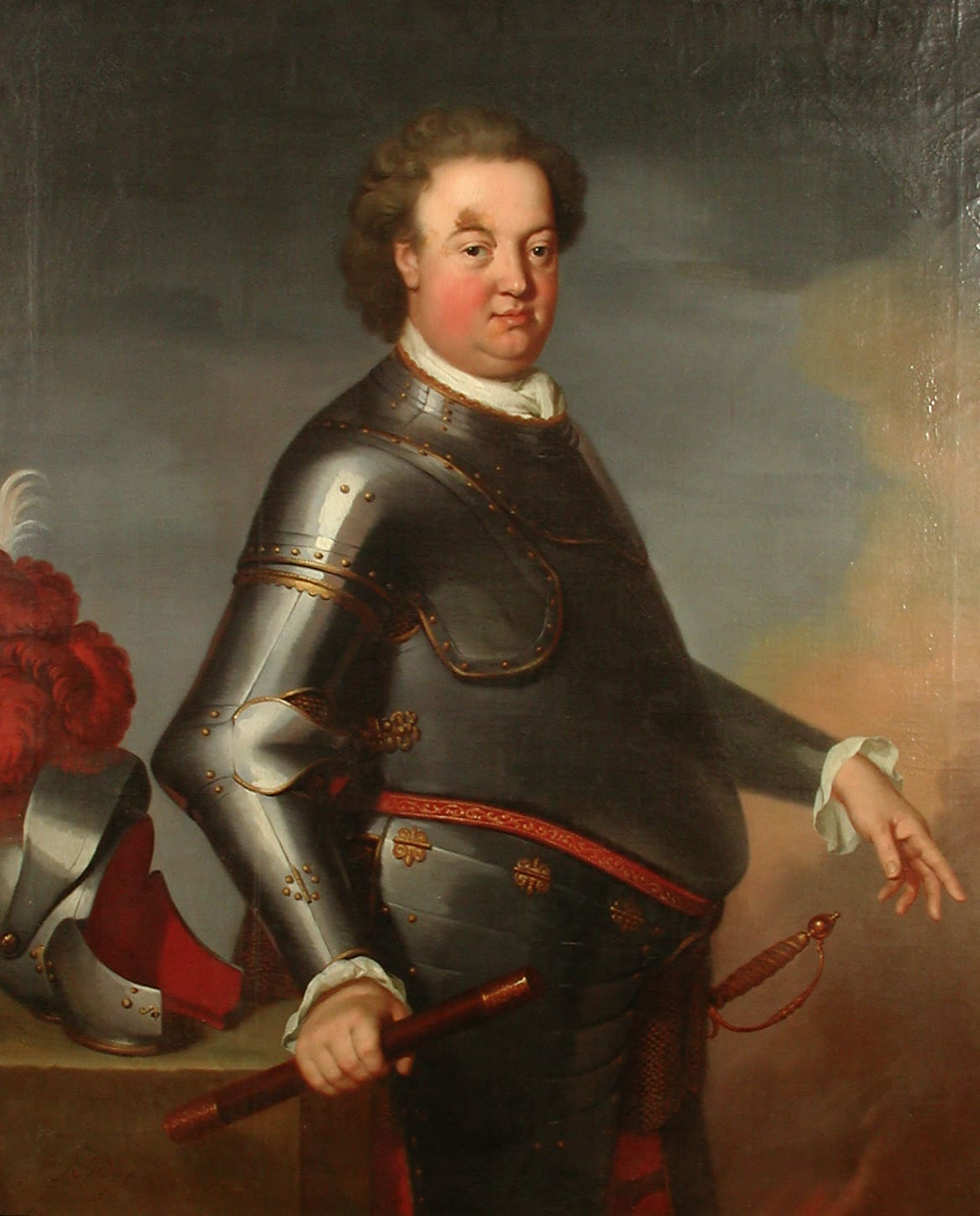
Count Frederick Adolphus Portrait by Hans Hinrich Rundt (1703)

Frederick Adolphus of Lippe-Detmold (Friedrich Adolf zur Lippe-Detmold; 2 September 1667 – 18 July 1718) was a German nobleman and the Count of Lippe-Detmold from 1697 to 1718.

Born in Detmold Palace, Frederick Adolphus was the eldest of sixteen children of Simon Henry, Count of Lippe-Detmold and Baroness Amalia of Dohna-Vianen, Burgravine of Utrecht and heiress of Vianen and Ameide.

== Life ==
He broke with the tradition of his predecessors, who had paid a subsidy to the Holy Roman Empire in lieu of their military obligations, by raising his own company of Lippe troops. This was increased to battalion strength as required by the Empire. However, during his rule the troops did not see any operational service. Frederick Adolphus apparently rewarded his followers with generous donations; for example, on 16 June 1699 he enfeoffed Frantz Dietrich Bohsen with the village of Ilendorf between Pömbsen and Nieheim, with the Court of Döringsfelde, and the tithes of Wintrup and Großen Heisten. In 1712, he enfeoffed the sons of his Lieutenant Johann Adolf von Schledorn with the town of Anröchte.

In October 1698, Frederick Adolphus took the Hamburg Baroque artist, Hans Hinrich Rundt, into his service. Rundt painted a number of portraits of the Count's family and also decorated the luxurious renovations of the comital palace, with wall and ceiling paintings.

The Count was a typical Baroque ruler. His building work overburdened the territory's finances. In 1716, the Russian Tsar Peter the Great commented on the occasion of a hunting visit in Bad Pyrmont: "Your Highness is too big for this country". His most famous project, the Friedrichstal Canal (German: Friedrichstaler Kanal) is still visible today in Detmold and is a popular Sunday walk for the local population. The Dutch hydraulic engineering specialist Hendrick Kock was responsible for the construction of the canal. His "Favorite Palace" (German: Schloss Favorite) was located on one side of the canal and, since 1954, has been part of the Detmold College of Music (Hochschule für Musik Detmold). The subsequent landscaped parks made in the English style Palace Garden (German: Palaisgarten) were opened to the public only in 1919. From the Garden Friedrichstal only remained the Mausoleum at Büchenberg, the Neuer Krug and the Krummes Haus on the site of today's Detmold Open-air Museum. In order to provide the appropriate framework of this project, the Count ordered the construction near the south gate of a cavalier house, now the Hotel Lippischer Hof and a group of new houses, who formed the today's vicinity of Neustadt.

Frederick Adolphus was awarded in 1712 with the Prussian Order of the Black Eagle.

== Marriages and Issue ==
In Schaumburg on 16 June 1692 Frederick Adolphus married firstly with Countess Johanna Elisabeth of Nassau-Dillenburg (Schaumburg a.d.Lahn, 5 September 1663 - Detmold, 9 February 1700), the daughter of Adolph, Prince of Nassau-Schaumburg. They had six children:

1. Simon Henry Adolph (Detmold, 25 January 1694 - Detmold, 12 October 1734), Count and since 27 October 1720 Prince of Lippe-Detmold.
2. Charles Frederick (Detmold, 1 January 1695 - Detmold, 28 May 1725).
3. Amalia (Detmold, 11 November 1695 - Detmold, 22 December 1696).
4. Charlotte Amalie (Detmold, 7 September 1697 - Detmold, 14 June 1699).
5. Leopold Hermann (Detmold, 8 August 1698 - Detmold, 31 August 1701).
6. Frederick August (Detmold, 5 November 1699 - Detmold, 11 December 1724).

On 16 June 1700 Frederick Adolphus married secondly with Countess Amalia of Solms-Hohensolms (13 October 1678 - Detmold, 14 February 1746). They had seven children:

1. Amalie Luise (Detmold, 5 August 1701 - Cappel, 19 April 1751).
2. Elisabeth Charlotte (Detmold, 12 July 1702 - 27 March 1754), Abbess of St.Marien in Lemgo (1713 - 1751).
3. Charles Simon Louis (Detmold, 1 October 1703 - Vienna, 28 March 1723).
4. Franziska Charlotte (Detmold, 11 November 1704 - Burgsteinfurt, 12 June 1738), married in 1724 to Count Frederick Charles of Bentheim-Steinfurt.
5. Maximilian Henry (Runkel, 12 June 1706 - Runkel, 17 June 1706).
6. Charles Joseph (Detmold, 25 August 1709 - Halle, 27 March 1726).
7. Fredericka Adolphine (Detmold, 24 October 1711 - Detmold, 10 May 1766), married in 1736 to her first-cousin Count Frederick Alexander of Lippe-Detmold, Lord of Samrodt.

== Notes ==
Frederick Adolphus, Count of Lippe-Detmold House of Lippe Born: 2 September 1667 Died: 18 July 1718
Preceded by Simon Henry	Count of Lippe; 1697–1718	Succeeded by Simon Henry Adolph
