= Stassen =

Stassen is a Dutch patronymic surname, originally meaning "son of Stas", a short form of Eustathius.

- Ben Stassen (born 1959), Belgian film director and producer
- Franz Stassen (1869–1949), German painter and illustrator
- Glen Stassen (1936–2014), American ethicist, professor, and Baptist theologian
- Harold Stassen (1907–2001), American politician from Minnesota; governor of Minnesota 1939–1943; perennial candidate for U.S. president
- J. Robert Stassen (1927–2015), American politician; Minnesota state senator (1973–1976)
- Jean-Philippe Stassen (born 1966), Belgian comic-book artist
- Julien Stassen (born 1988), Belgian bicycle racer
- Laurence Stassen (born 1971), Dutch politician
- Riley G. Stassen-Raddatz (born 1994), American machinist
