= Lippe-Biesterfeld =

Cadet line of a German dynasty

House of Lippe-Biesterfeld
- Coat of arms of the House of Lippe combining the Lippian rose with the coat of arms of the counts of Schwalenberg
- Parent house: House of Lippe
- Country: Biesterfeld, Lippe, Germany, Netherlands
- Founded: 1625 (1st cadet house); 1916 (2nd cadet house)
- Founder: Jobst Herman
- Final head: Prince Bernhard of Lippe-Biesterfeld (1911–2004)
- Titles: Prince of Lippe; Prince of Lippe-Biesterfeld; Count of Lippe-Biesterfeld
- Dissolution: only female members

The House of Lippe-Biesterfeld was a comital and later princely cadet line of the House of Lippe (a German dynasty reigning from 1413 until 1918, of comital and, from 1789, of princely rank).

The comital branch of Lippe-Biesterfeld ascended the throne of the Principality of Lippe in 1905, after the extinction of the ruling main branch, when count Leopold of Lippe-Biesterfeld became Leopold IV, Prince of Lippe. He continued to rule until the German Revolution of 1918. In 1916, he created his younger brother, count Bernhard of Lippe-Biesterfeld, a prince. Through the latter's son, Prince Bernhard of Lippe-Biesterfeld (1911–2004), the prince consort of Queen Juliana of the Netherlands, it also became a title of the Dutch Royal House, created in 1937.

== History ==
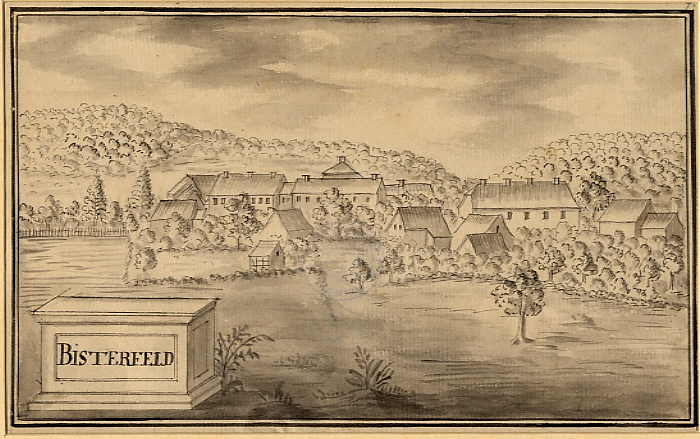
Biesterfeld estate in 1764

The branch of Lippe-Biesterfeld was founded by Count Jobst Herman (1625–1678), youngest son of Count Simon VII of Lippe-Detmold. He received Biesterfeld with parts of the former county of Schwalenberg, as a paragium. From the Lippe-Biesterfeld branch the line of Lippe-Weissenfeld was separated in 1734. Both, Biesterfeld and Weissenfeld were so-called paragiums (non-sovereign estates of a cadet-branch) of the ruling House of Lippe. Jobst Herman built the manor of Biesterfeld around 1660. Frederick Charles Augustus, Count of Lippe, moved the comital brewery from Schwalenberg to Biesterfeld in 1740. However, both the lands of Lippe-Biesterfeld and Lippe-Weissenfeld were ceded and sold to the princely line of Lippe-Detmold on 24 May 1762. Frederick Charles Augustus preferred to live in a hunting lodge in the Sachsenwald forest, near Hamburg, named after him, Friedrichsruh, the current home of the Princes of Bismarck.

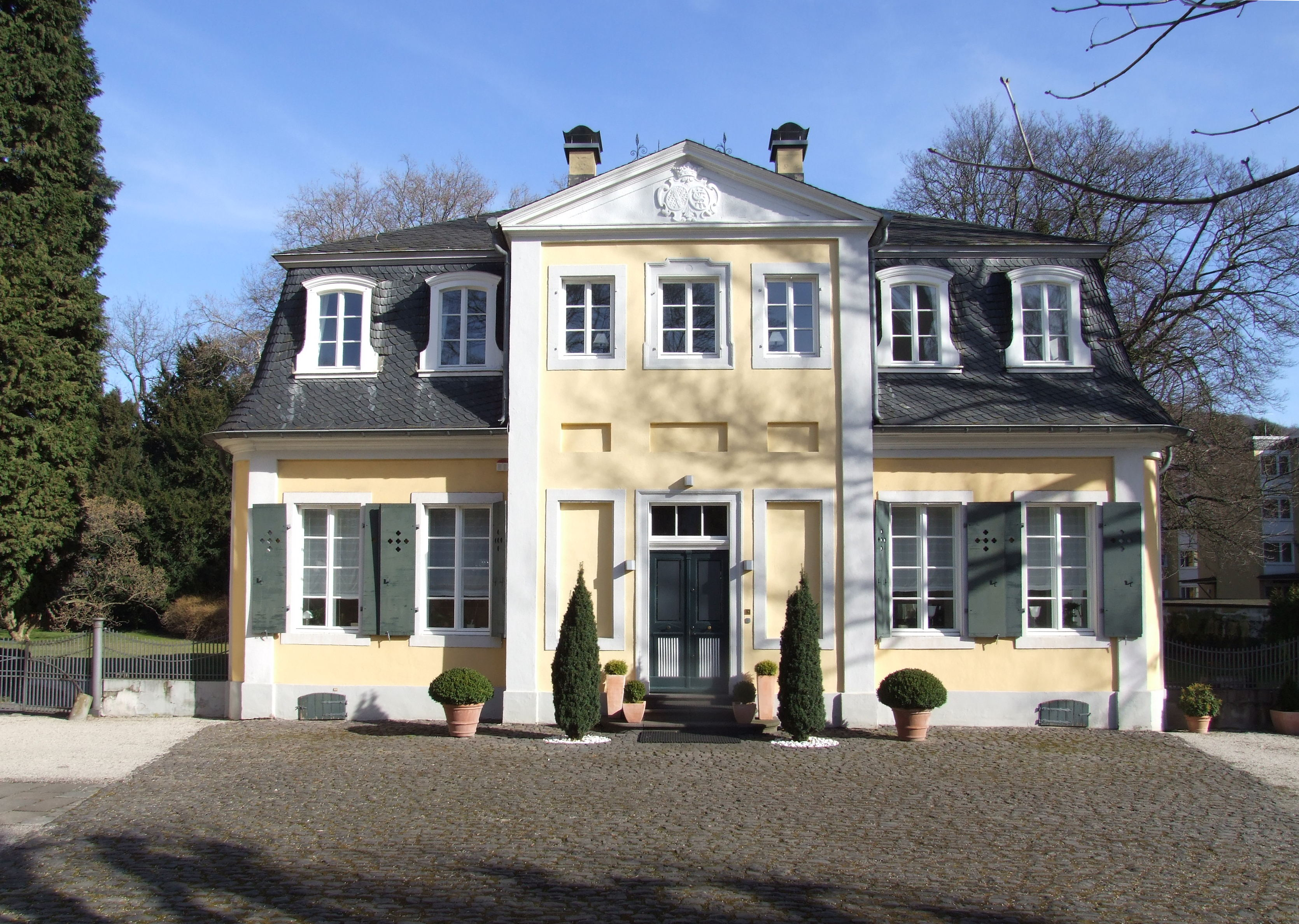
Lippe House at Oberkassel, Bonn, owned by the Lippe-Biesterfeld branch since 1770

Frederick William (1737–1803), the eldest surviving son of count Frederick Charles Augustus, married Elisabeth Johanna, Edle von Meinertzhagen (1752–1811) who inherited a small manor house at Oberkassel, Bonn, where the couple moved in 1770, and which was to become the home to the Lippe-Biesterfeld family for the following 209 years. Beethoven is said to have been the piano teacher of the couple's children.

The Head of the Lippe-Biesterfeld family was given the style Illustrious Highness (German: Erlaucht) at Detmold on 27 August and 1 October 1844.

When, in 1895, the mentally ill Prince Alexander ascended the throne of the Principality of Lippe, Prince Adolf of Schaumburg-Lippe was appointed to act as regent of Lippe, according to a then secretly kept decree of the predecessor Prince Woldemar. Alexander was the last male of the Lippe-Detmold line; the next senior lines of the House of Lippe were the Counts of Lippe-Biesterfeld, followed by the Counts of Lippe-Weissenfeld, and then by the most junior line the Princes of Schaumburg-Lippe. Shortly after becoming a member state of the German Empire in 1871, Prince Woldemar of the Lippe-Detmold line died on 20 July 1895. The next ruler was his brother, Alexander, Prince of Lippe, but the power needed to be exercised by a regent throughout his reign on account of his mental illness. This right for regency resulted in an inheritance dispute between the neighboring principality of Schaumburg-Lippe and the Lippe-Biesterfeld line.

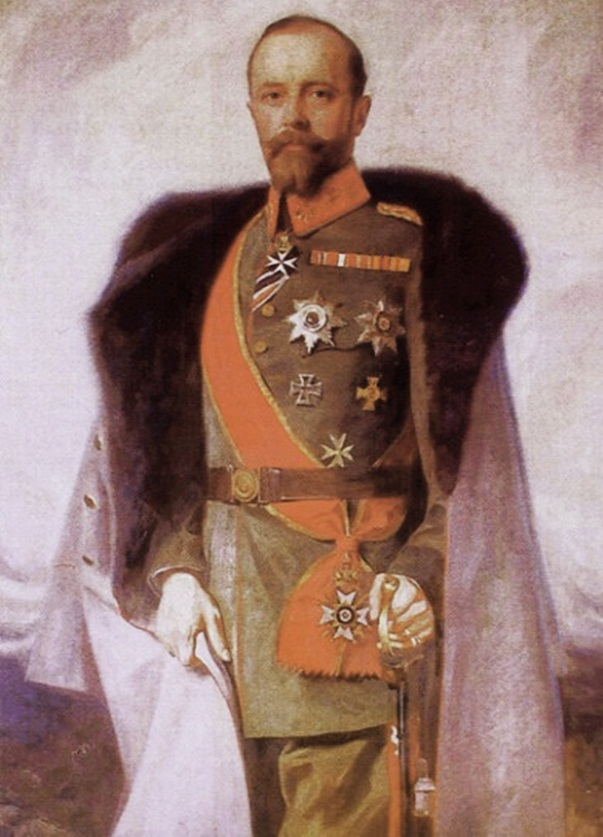
Leopold IV, Prince of Lippe (1871–1949), the first and only ruler of Lippe of the Biesterfeld branch

Ernest, Count of Lippe-Biesterfeld, hitherto living at Oberkassel, became regent of the principality from 1897 until his death in 1904. The dispute was only resolved by the Imperial Court in Leipzig in 1905, with the lands passing to the Lippe-Biesterfeld line who, until this point, had no territorial sovereignty. Ernest's son Prince Leopold IV (1871–1949) was the first and only count of Lippe-Biesterfeld to become ruling prince of Lippe, residing at Detmold Castle.

Prince Bernhard of Lippe (1872–1934), the younger brother of Leopold IV and father of prince consort Bernhard of Lippe-Biesterfeld, was born at Oberkassel and grew up there. Later he acquired castle Reckenwalde and an estate in East Brandenburg (today Wojnowo, Poland), where his son grew up. A first cousin of the prince-consort, Prince Ernst August of Lippe (1917–1990), sold the house at Oberkassel in 1979, after he had acquired Syburg castle at Bergen, Middle Franconia, in 1970.

The current head of the House of Lippe is Stephan, Prince of Lippe (born 24 May 1959), a grandson of Leopold IV, and present owner of Detmold Castle. He is also a first cousin once removed of Prince Bernhard of the Netherlands (1911–2004), the prince consort of Queen Juliana of the Netherlands (1909–2004).

== 1916-1918: Princes of Lippe-Biesterfeld ==
- Prince Bernhard of Lippe-Biesterfeld, Prince of Lippe-Biesterfeld 1916–1918 (1911–2004)

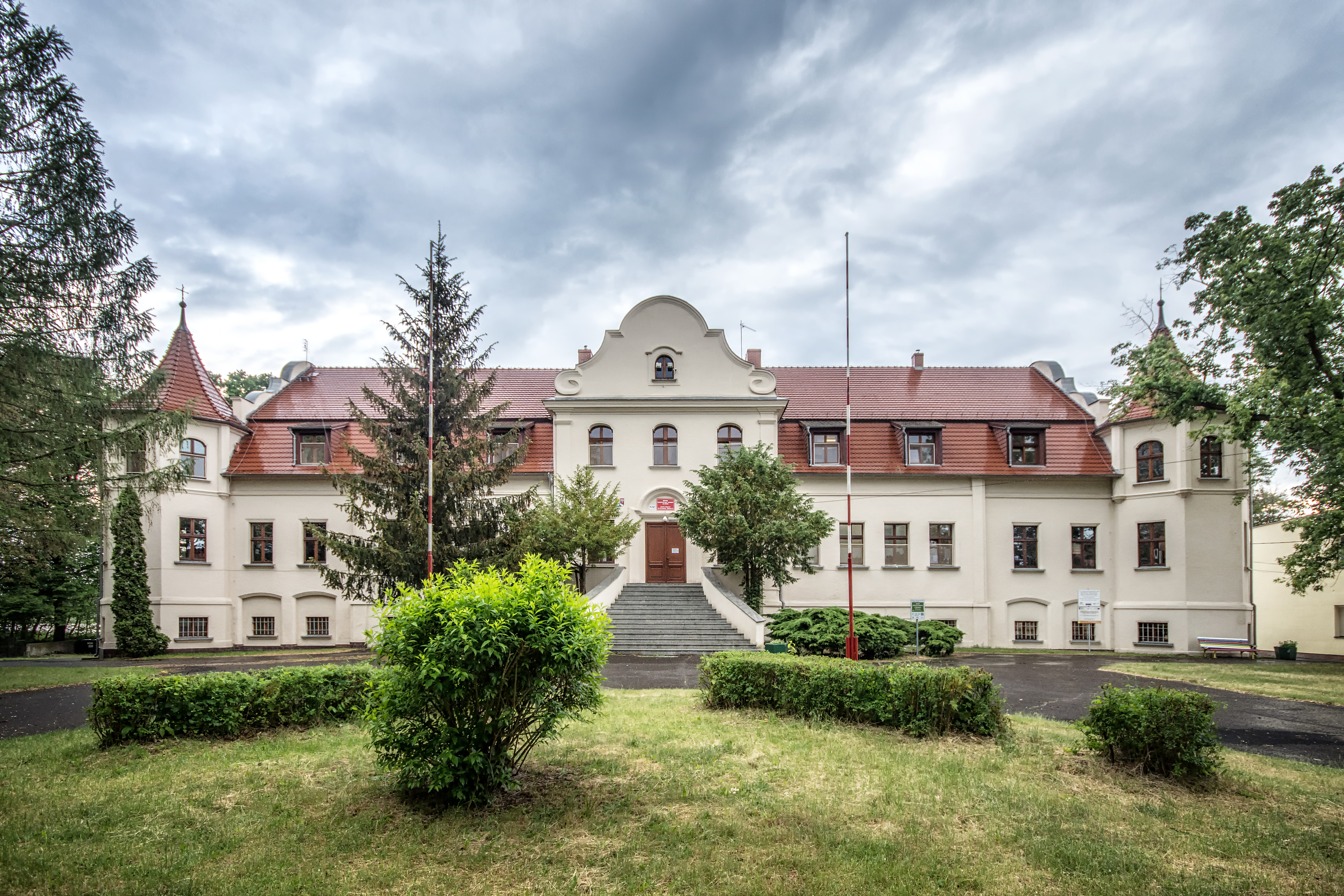
Reckenwalde palace, today Wojnowo in Poland, where Prince Bernhard spent his youth

== 1909–1916: Morganatic title and new cadet line ==
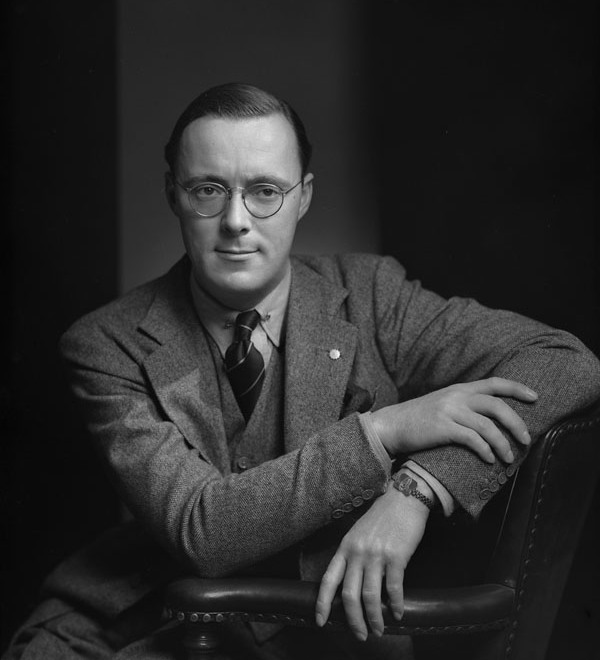
Prince Bernhard of Lippe-Biesterfeld, the later prince-consort of the Netherlands, in 1942.

On 8 February 1909, the title Countess of Biesterfeld (not related to the previous title Count of Lippe-Biesterfeld) was created for Armgard von Cramm (1883–1971) and her descendants. Armgard was the wife of Prince Bernhard of Lippe (1872–1934), the brother of Prince Leopold IV. On 24 February 1916, Armgard and her two sons Bernhard (1911–2004) and Aschwin (1914–1988) were created Prince(ss) of Lippe-Biesterfeld with the style Serene Highness. They returned to a more senior position in the line of succession to the Lippian throne, in which they previously had been the very last. The suffix Biesterfeld was revived to mark the foundation of a new cadet line.

== 1937 – present: Dutch royal title ==
By royal decree of 6 January 1937, the titles Prince of the Netherlands, with the style Royal Highness, and Prince of Lippe-Biesterfeld, were created in the Kingdom of the Netherlands for Prince Bernhard and his descendants. The Lippe-Biesterfeld title hereby became also a Dutch one. On 7 January 1937, Bernhard married Princess Juliana of the Netherlands (who later was the Queen regnant of the Netherlands between 1948 and 1980). From this marriage, four daughters were born who all hold the title Princess of Lippe-Biesterfeld:

- Beatrix (born 1938, Queen of the Netherlands from 1980 to 2013)
- Irene (born 1939)
- Margriet (born 1943)
- Christina (1947–2019)

Since the title can only be inherited in the male line, the title will become extinct after the death of Prince Bernhard's daughters.

== 1998 – present: Dutch surname ==
By royal decree of 26 May 1998, the descendants of Prince Maurits of Orange-Nassau, van Vollenhoven (born 1968), eldest son of Princess Margriet, all have the newly created surname van Lippe-Biesterfeld van Vollenhoven.

== See also ==
- List of consorts of Lippe
