= Biesterfeld (company) =

Biesterfeld SE
- Company type: Societas Europaea
- Industry: Chemistry and plastic
- Founded: 1906
- Headquarters: Hamburg, Germany
- Key people: Dr. Stephan Glander (CEO), Dirk J. Biesterfeld (Chairman of the supervisory board)
- Revenue: €1.38bn (2023)
- Number of employees: >1.100 (2023)
- Website: www.biesterfeld.com

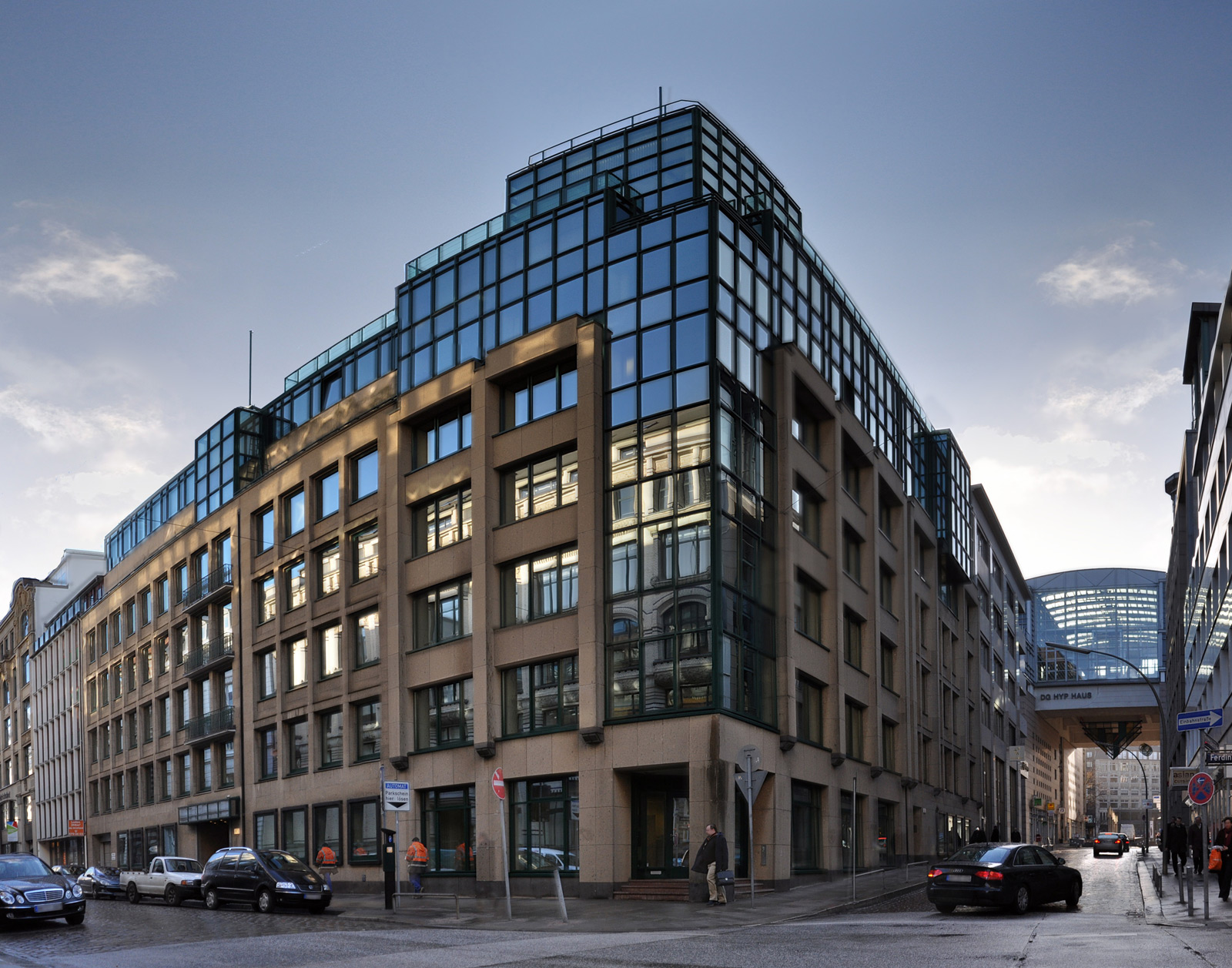
Biesterfeld SE Hamburg Ferdinandstr

The Biesterfeld SE is the strategic holding of the Biesterfeld group of companies, a distributor for plastics and chemicals with subsidiaries in more than 30 countries worldwide. The headquarters of the family-owned company is in Hamburg, Germany.

The parent company Wilhelm E. H. Biesterfeld GmbH & Co. KG changed its legal status in 2004, and became the strategic holding of the group, called since then Biesterfeld AG and transformed to Biesterfeld SE in late 2024.
