= Jobst Herman, Count of Lippe =

German nobleman (1625–1678)

- Born: 9 February 1625; Detmold
- Died: 6 July 1678 (aged 53); Biesterfeld
- Noble family: House of Lippe
- Spouse: Juliane Elisabeth of Sayn-Wittgenstein-Hohenstein
- Father: Simon VII, Count of Lippe
- Mother: Countess Maria Magdalena of Waldeck-Wildungen

Jobst Herman of Lippe-Biesterfeld (9 February 1625 in Detmold – 6 July 1678 in Biesterfeld) was a titular Count of Lippe, Sternberg and Schwalenberg.

== Early life ==
He was the son of Count Simon VII from 1587 to 1627) from his marriage to Countess Maria Magdalena of Waldeck-Wildungen (1606-1671) and is considered the founder of the Lippe-Biesterfeld line, as a result of his creation of the Biesterfeld manor, between 1654 and 1665.

== Marriage and issue ==
Jobst Hermann married on 10 October 1654 to Countess Juliane Elisabeth of Sayn-Wittgenstein-Hohenstein (4 October 1634 – 23 June 1689). His cousin, their mothers being sisters. Their children were styled Count (or Countess) of Lippe-Biesterfeld:

- Juliane Elisabeth (15 June 1656 – 29 April 1709)
- John Augustus (15 October 1657 – 9 September 1709)
- Charlotte Sophie (16 September 1658 – 25 April 1672)
- Simon Christian (8 October 1659 – 9 November 1660)
- Theodore Adolph (22 October 1660 – 9 March 1709)
- Christine Mary (12 February 1662 – 14 June 1710)
- Christiane Ernestine (12 July 1664 – 28 December 1686)
- Anna Auguste (14 September 1665 – 25 August 1730)
- John Frederick (6 November 1666 – 21 February 1712)
- Magdalene Emilie (30 November 1667 – 25 June 1677)
- Concordia Dorothea (18 December 1668 – 25 June 1677)
- John George Louis (12 January 1670 – 22 January 1693)
- Rudolph Ferdinand (17 March 1671 – 12 June 1736); father of Count Frederick Charles Augustus. Another younger son of his, Count Ferdinand, founded the Lippe-Weissenfeld line of the family.
- William Christian (November 1672 – 6 May 1674)
- Simon Christian (4 March 1674 – 23 June 1677)
- Elisabeth Charlotte (21 March 1675 – 22 August 1676)
- Juliane Sophie (6 December 1676 – 2 June 1705)
- Justine Hermione (20 May 1679 – 15 June 1704)
