= Baruth bei Bautzen =

Village in Saxony, Germany

Baruth Bart
- Village of Malschwitz
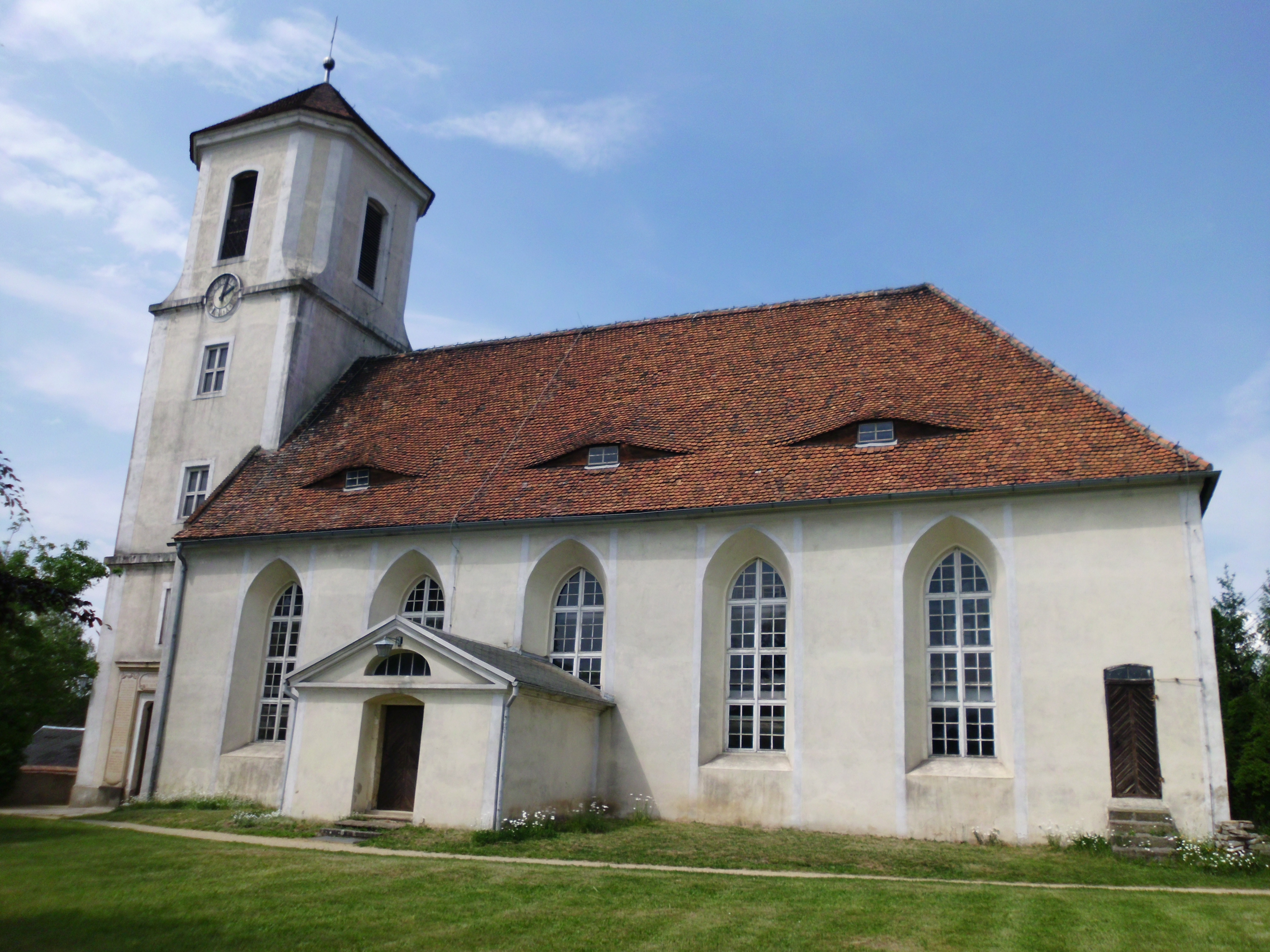
- Evangelical Lutheran Church, Baruth.
- Interactive map of Baruth; Bart
- Location within Germany Location within Saxony
- Coordinates: 51°13′40″N 14°35′30″E
- Country: Germany
- State: Saxony
- District: Bautzen
- Municipality: Malschwitz
- Elevation: 152 m (499 ft)

Population
  - Total: 412
- Time zone: UTC+01:00 (CET)
  - Summer (DST): UTC+02:00 (CEST)
- Postal codes: 02694
- Dialling codes: 035932
- Website: http://www.baruth-sachsen.de/

Baruth (German) or Bart (Upper Sorbian, pronounced [ˈbaʁt]) is a village in the east of Saxony, Germany. It is part of the municipality of Malschwitz. It belongs to the district of Bautzen and lies 15 km northeast of the town of Bautzen. The Sorbs have long inhabited the area; while their numbers are declining, the Upper Sorbian language is still the second official language.

== History ==
From 1952 to 1990, Baruth was part of the Bezirk Dresden of East Germany.
