= Simon VII of Lippe =

Simon VII, Count of Lippe
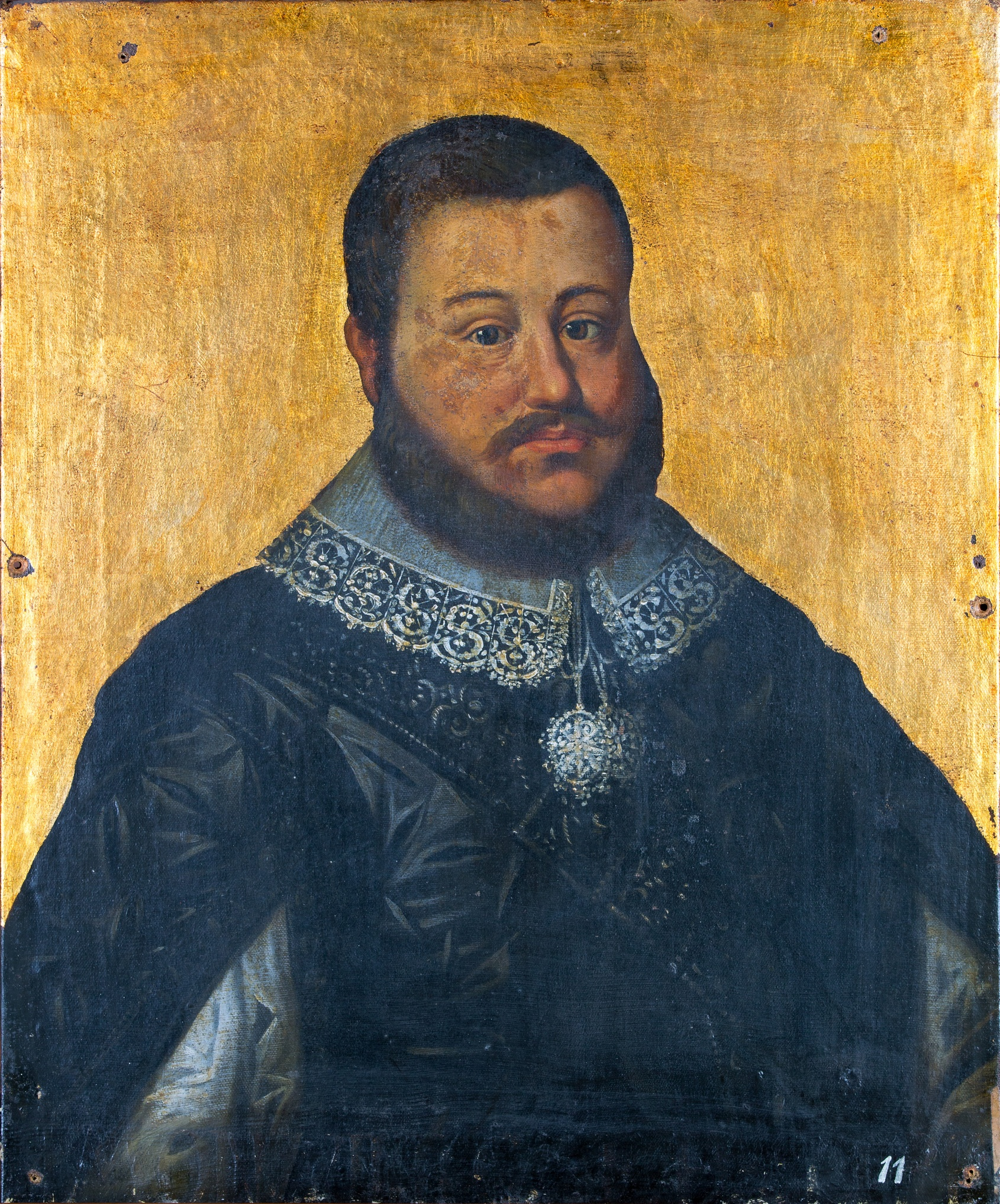
- Born: 30 December 1587; Brake Castle, near Lemgo
- Died: 26 March 1627 (aged 39); Detmold
- Noble family: House of Lippe
- Spouses: Anne Catherine of Nassau-Wiesbaden-Idstein; Maria Magdalena of Waldeck-Wildungen
- Father: Simon VI, Count of Lippe
- Mother: Elizabeth of Schauenburg and Holstein

Count Simon VII of Lippe (30 December 1587 at Brake Castle near Lemgo – 26 March 1627 in Detmold) was a ruler of the Reformed County of Lippe-Detmold.

== Life ==
He was the younger son of Count Simon VI of Lippe and his wife Elizabeth of Schauenburg and Holstein.

In 1601, Simon and his older brother Bernard travelled to Kassel, where they studied at the court school. After Bernard's untimely death in 1602, Simon returned to Brake, where his father introduced him systematically to the business of government. When his father died in 1613, he took up government. In 1617, he managed to end a bitter dispute his late father had had with the city of Lemgo. Simon VI had tried to enforce Calvinism throughout the county, but the citizens of Lemgo preferred Lutheranism. The Treaty of Röhrentrup allowed Lutheranism in Lemgo and gave the city the right of High justice, which the city then used to organize witch trials.

Simon VII remained neutral during the Thirty Years' War, in an attempt to spare his small country as much as possible. The country suffered nevertheless, when foreign soldiers were billeted in the county.

== Marriage and issue ==
Simon VII married Countess Anna Catherine (1590–1622), daughter of John Louis I, Count of Nassau-Wiesbaden-Idstein, in 1607. They had the following children:

- Unnamed son (died: 23 February 1609)
- Simon Louis (1610–1636), married in 1631 to Countess Catherine of Waldeck-Wildungen (1612–1649)
- Mary Elizabeth (1611–1667) married in 1649 to Count Christian Frederick of Mansfeld-Hinterort (1615–1666)
- Anna Catherine (1612–1659) married in Prince Frederick von Anhalt-Harzgerode (1613–1670)
- John Bernard (1613–1652)
- Otto Henry (1614–1648), murdered in 1648
- Herman Adolph (1616–1666) married:
  1. in 1648 to Countess Ernestine of Isenburg-Büdingen-Birstein (1614–1665)
  2. in 1666 to Countess Amalia of Lippe-Brake (1629–1676)
- Juliana Ursula (1617–1630)
- John Louis (1618–1628)
- Frederick Philip (1619–1629)
- Magdalene (1620–1646)
- Simon (1620–1624)

After Anna Catherine's death, he married Countess Maria Magdalena of Waldeck-Wildungen (1606–1671), daughter of Christian, Count of Waldeck-Wildungen, in 1623 and had three more children:

- Christian (1623–1634)
- Sophie Elisabeth (1624–1688), married in 1644 to Count George William of Leiningen-Westerburg
- Jobst Herman (1625–1678), married in 1654 to Countess Elisabeth Juliane of Sayn-Wittgenstein. He was the founder of the Lippe-Biesterfeld line.

Simon VII of Lippe House of Lippe Born: 30 December 1587 Died: 30 December 1587
Preceded by Simon VI	Count of Lippe-Detmold; 1613–1627	Succeeded by Simon Louis
Preceded by Simon VI	Count of Lippe-Detmold; 1613–1627	Succeeded by Jobst Herman as Lord of Lippe-Biesterfeld
