= Latin Diocese of Tiflis =

Roman Catholic titular see

The Diocese of Tiflis was a short-lived (1329–56) Roman Catholic bishopric in Transcaucasia, with its seat in the present Tbilisi (capital of Georgia), which was suppressed but turned into a Latin titular see until its ultimate suppression.

== History ==
It was established on 9 August 1329 as the Diocese of Tiflis (Latin: Tephlisen(sis) or Tiphlitana), without a direct precursor. No residential incumbent was available.

It was suppressed in 1356 without any direct successor, but immediately turned into a Latin Titular bishopric of the same name, Tiflis.

It was again suppressed in about 1800, even as a titular see, having had the following incumbents, of the appropriate episcopal (lowest) rank with a single archiepiscopal exception, also the only secular priest:

- Heinrich Vuyst, Friars Minor (O.F.M.) (24 December 1462 – death in 1468) as Auxiliary Bishop of Paderborn (31 December 1462 – 1468)
- Johannes Ymminck, Augustinians (O.E.S.A.) (10 July 1469 – 14 April 1493), first as Auxiliary Bishop of Paderborn (10 July 1469 – 1472), then as Auxiliary Bishop of Münster (1472 – retired 1484); died 1493
- Albert Engel, O.F.M. (18 April 1493 – death on 18 November 1500) as Auxiliary Bishop of Paderborn (18 April 1493 – 18 November 1500)
- Johannes Schneider, O.F.M. (19 April 1507 – death on 27 March 1551) as Auxiliary Bishop of Paderborn (19 April 1507 – 27 March 1551)
- Titular Archbishop Stephanus Autandil (24 May 1785 – death on 6 December 1794), no actual prelature.

== Sources and external links ==
- GCatholic - data for all sections
