= Theodoric I of Paderborn =

Theodoric I (German: Theoderich, also Theodor or Dietrich) (died 916) was the Bishop of Paderborn from 908 to 916.

Virtually no record of Theodoric's life and work has survived. However, it was the period of the Hungarian invasions of Europe and the conflicts between the Saxon and Frankish duchies. During the revolt by Duke Henry the Fowler against King Conrad the Saxon bishops aligned themselves with Henry. At the hill castle of Eresburg (Marsberg) in the Bishopric of Paderborn a bloody feud arose in 915 in which Theoderic was also supposed to have participated militarily.

Theodoric died on 8 December 916 and is very probably interred in Paderborn Cathedral.

== Literature ==
- Hans J. Brandt; Karl Hengst (1984), Die Bischöfe und Erzbischöfe von Paderborn (in German), Paderborn: Bonifatius-Druckerei, p. 54, ISBN 3-87088-381-2
- Friedrich Wilhelm Ebeling: Die deutschen Bischöfe bis zum Ende des sechszehnten Jahrhunderts. Vol. 2, Leipzig, 1858, p. 346.
- Peter Florens Weddigen (ed.): Paderbornische Geschichte nach Schatens Annalen. Lemgo, 1801 pp. 57ff.

Preceded by Biso	Bishop of Paderborn; 908–916	Succeeded by Unwan
