= Johannes Joachim Degenhardt =

German Roman Catholic archbishop (1926–2002)

His Eminence Johannes Joachim Degenhardt
- Cardinal Archbishop of Paderborn
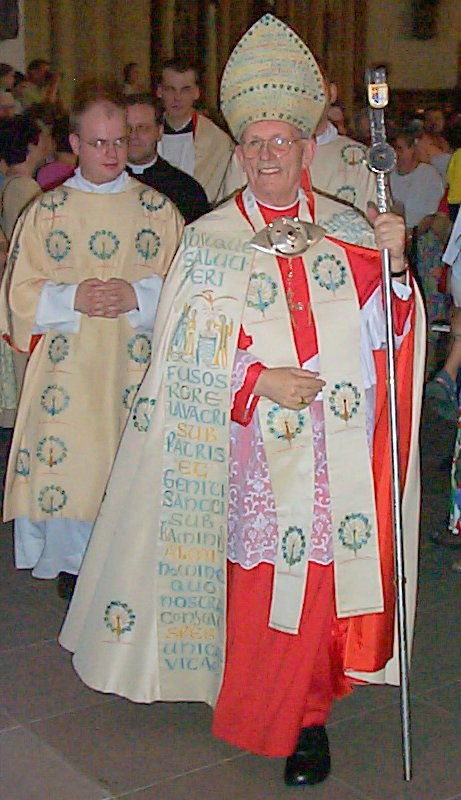
- Diocese: Roman Catholic Archdiocese of Paderborn
- Appointed: April 1974
- Term ended: 25 July 2002
- Predecessor: Lorenz Jaeger
- Successor: Hans-Josef Becker
- Other post: Cardinal-Priest of San Liborio
- Previous post: Auxiliary Bishop of Paderborn (1968–1974)

Orders
- Ordination: 6 August 1952 by Lorenz Jaeger
- Consecration: 1 May 1968 by Lorenz Jaeger
- Created cardinal: 21 February 2001 by John Paul II
- Rank: Cardinal-Priest

Personal details
- Born: 31 January 1926 Schwelm, Germany
- Died: 25 July 2002 (aged 76) Paderborn, Germany
- Denomination: Roman Catholic Church
- Coat of arms

Johannes Joachim Degenhardt (31 January 1926 – 25 July 2002) was the Roman Catholic Archbishop of Paderborn (Germany) from 1974 until his death in 2002. He was named Cardinal in 2001.

== Life ==
Degenhardt grew up in Hagen, where he attended the humanistic Albrecht Dürer Gymnasium. He belonged to the Catholic youth group, Bund Neudeutschland; as a member of this youth organisation, which was banned by the Nazis, he was arrested by the Gestapo in 1941, when he co-organised a demonstration of young people to show loyalty to the new spiritual leader, Lorenz Jaeger, on the day of his consecration as the Bishop of Paderborn.

Degenhardt had already been suspected by the Gestapo for some time, since he had risked his life by secretly circulating the sermons of the Münster Bishop Clemens August Graf von Galen. He was held in solitary confinement for several weeks in the Dortmund Gestapo headquarters, imprisoned in a 3 x 1.5 m cell, beaten by the guards and not released until Christmas of 1941, with the warning that he would be sent to a concentration camp if he said anything about his imprisonment. After his release, he was expelled from the Gymnasium.

During the Second World War, he was conscripted as an aid in the Luftwaffe and was taken as a prisoner of war, from which he was released in 1946. After the War, he completed secondary school and studied philosophy and theology in Paderborn and Munich. On 6 August 1952 he was ordained as a priest by Archbishop Lorenz Jaeger in the Paderborn Cathedral.

He was a curate in Brackwede for five years after that. As of 1957, he was administrator of the priest's office there, and then temporary substitute for the priest until he was appointed as a prefect of the archiepiscopal Collegium Leonium in Paderborn by Archbishop Jaeger.

On 28 January 1964 he received his doctorate degree in theology from Professor Rudolf Schnackenburg; the topic of his dissertation was "Luke - Evangelist of the Poor". He then worked as an assistant professor at the Ruhr-Universität Bochum.

In 1965, Degenhardt became university chaplain at the Pädagogische Hochschule Westfalen/Lippe in Paderborn and then in February of the same year, he became diocese representative of the Katholisches Bibelwerk.

On 18 March 1968 Pope Paul VI named Degenhardt as auxiliary bishop in Paderborn and titular bishop of Vicus Pacati. The motto of Degenhardt was Surrexit Dominus vere (The Lord has truly risen, from the Easter liturgy). Cardinal Lorenz Jaeger, Archbishop of Paderborn, had Degenhardt consecrated as bishop on 1 May 1968. The consecrators were Ruhr Bishop Franz Hengsbach and Auxiliary Bishop Paul Nordhues.

Cardinal Jaeger resigned from his office as archbishop at the beginning of 1973. The cathedral chapter of the archdiocese of Paderborn then elected Degenhardt as vicar capitular, and Pope Paul VI named him as the new archbishop of Paderborn in April 1974. In 1999, he celebrated his 25th anniversary in that office at the Liborifest, a traditional Paderborn celebration in honor of St. Liborius of Le Mans.

On 8 October 1991 Archbishop Degenhardt withdrew ecclesiastical teaching authorization from the priest and university teacher, Eugen Drewermann, after he refused to retract certain statements which were not in agreement with Catholic teachings; among other things, Drewermann had questioned the virgin birth and the bodily resurrection of Jesus. On 26 March 1992 Drewermann was also suspended from the priesthood.

=== Incardination ===
Pope John Paul II named Archbishop Degenhardt to be a cardinal, along with Bishop Karl Lehmann of Mainz and five other bishops, on 28 January 2001, after he had just named 37 cardinals one week earlier. Pope John Paul II himself explained his naming only one year later on the occasion of Degenhardt's death in a letter of condolence written from the World Youth Day in Toronto as follows: "With his appointment to cardinal, I wanted to make visible the faithful evidence of the Paderborn spiritual leader for the entire world church."

On 21 February 2001 he received the Paderborn archbishop as a cardinal priest with the titular church of San Liborio into the college of cardinals in the largest consistory of modern church history. Degenhardt held various ecclesiastical offices, including the leadership of the Eccumenical Commission of the German Bishops Conference from 1974 to 1976.

== Death and funeral ==
Degenhardt died suddenly in the early morning of 25 July 2002 in the archiepiscopal palace in Paderborn at the age of 76. The funeral took place on 3 August 2002.

In 2003, Hans-Josef Becker became Degenhardt's successor as archbishop of Paderborn.

== Honours ==
Cardinal Degenhardt held numerous high decorations and awards. He was an honorary citizen of the city of Paderborn and bearer of the Great Bundesverdienstkreuz with Star. In accordance with his rank as a cardinal, he was also a Grand Crusader in the Order of the Holy Sepulchre, a papal lay order. In addition, he was an honorary member of the K.D.St.V. Guestfalo-Silesia Paderborn in the CV. He received the Award of the French Order Chevalier dans l'Ordre national du mérite in 1998.

Degenhardt was a cousin of the German poet and singer Franz Josef Degenhardt.

Catholic Church titles
Preceded by Lorenz Jaeger	Archbishop of Paderborn; 1974–2002	Succeeded by Hans-Josef Becker
