= Lorenz Jaeger =

German cardinal

His Eminence Lorenz Jaeger
- Archbishop Emeritus of Paderborn
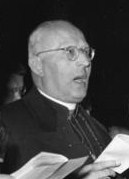
- Jaeger on 5 September 1954.
- Church: Roman Catholic Church
- Archdiocese: Paderborn
- See: Paderborn
- Appointed: 10 August 1941
- Term ended: 30 June 1973
- Predecessor: Kaspar Klein
- Successor: Johannes Joachim Degenhardt
- Other post: Cardinal-Priest of San Leone I (1965-75)

Orders
- Ordination: 1 April 1922
- Consecration: 19 October 1941 by Cesare Orsenigo
- Created cardinal: 22 February 1965 by Pope Paul VI
- Rank: Cardinal-Priest

Personal details
- Born: Lorenz Jaeger; 23 September 1892 Halle an der Saale, Province of Saxony, Kingdom of Prussia, German Empire
- Died: 1 April 1975 (aged 82) Paderborn, West Germany
- Education: Ludwig-Maximilians-Universität München (LMU)
- Motto: Vita et pax ("Life and peace")
- Coat of arms

Styles of Lorenz Jaeger
- Reference style: His Eminence
- Spoken style: Your Eminence
- Informal style: Cardinal
- See: Paderborn (emeritus)

Lorenz Jaeger (23 September 1892 – 1 April 1975) was a German cardinal of the Roman Catholic Church, who served as Archbishop of Paderborn from 1941 to 1973, and was elevated to the cardinalate in 1965.

== Biography ==
Lorenz Jaeger was born in Halle, and studied at Paderborn University and the Ludwig-Maximilians-Universität München. Ordained on 1 April 1922, he then did pastoral work in Paderborn until 1926. He taught at Studenrat Herne in Westphalia (1926–1933) and at Hindenburg Realgymnasium in Dortmund (1933–1939). During World War II, he served as a military chaplain from 1939 to 1941.

On 10 August 1941, Jaeger was appointed Archbishop of Paderborn by Pope Pius XII. He received his episcopal consecration on the following 19 October from Archbishop Cesare Orsenigo, with Bishops Joseph Machens and Augustus Baumann serving as co-consecrators.

In 1946 Jaeger and Wilhelm Stählin co-founded an ecumenical study group of Catholic and Lutheran theologians called the "Jaeger-Stählin-Circle".

From 1962 to 1965, Jaeger attended the Second Vatican Council, with Heribert Mühlen serving as his peritus, or theological expert. The Archbishop claimed that the Church had come to the "end of the Constantinian era," and needed to update the presentation of its teachings as time passed.

Pope Paul VI created him Cardinal Priest of San Leone I in the consistory of 22 February 1965. Jaeger later sat on the commission of cardinals instructed to examine the Dutch Catechism for theological orthodoxy. Upon reaching the age of 80 on 23 September 1972, he lost the right to participate in any future papal conclaves, an opportunity which he never received. The Cardinal resigned as Paderborn's archbishop on 30 June 1973, after thirty-one years of service.

A dedicated ecumenist, Jaeger founded the Johann Adam Möhler Ecumenical Institute (named after the German theologian) and helped establish, along with Augustin Bea, the Secretariat for Promoting Christian Unity in the Roman Curia.

Jaeger died in Paderborn, at age 82. He is buried in the Metropolitan Cathedral of Paderborn.

Catholic Church titles
Preceded by Kaspar Klein	Archbishop of Paderborn; 1941–1975	Succeeded by Johannes Joachim Degenhardt
