= Biso =

German bishop

Biso (887–909) was a Bishop of Paderborn.

Biso was born in the 9th century in the western part of the Duchy of Saxony. As the first bishop who was a freely elected cleric he was ordained on 2 May 887 by the Archbishop of Mainz, Liutbert. His investiture was presided over by King Charles the Fat. Biso was bishop from 887 to 9 September 909. He is interred in Paderborn Cathedral. During his time as bishop he dealt with eleven popes. He died on 9 September 909.

== Literature ==
- Brandt/Hengst: Die Bischöfe von Paderborn
- Hartig, Matthias; Hengst, Karl; Reker, Michael; Schmalor, Hermann-Josef (1993). Die Inkunabeln in der Erzbischöflichen Akademischen Bibliothek Paderborn (in German). Wiesbaden: Harrassowitz. ISBN 3-447-03310-X.

Preceded by Luithard	Bishop of Paderborn; 887–909	Succeeded by Theoderic
