= Möhnesee =

- Municipality
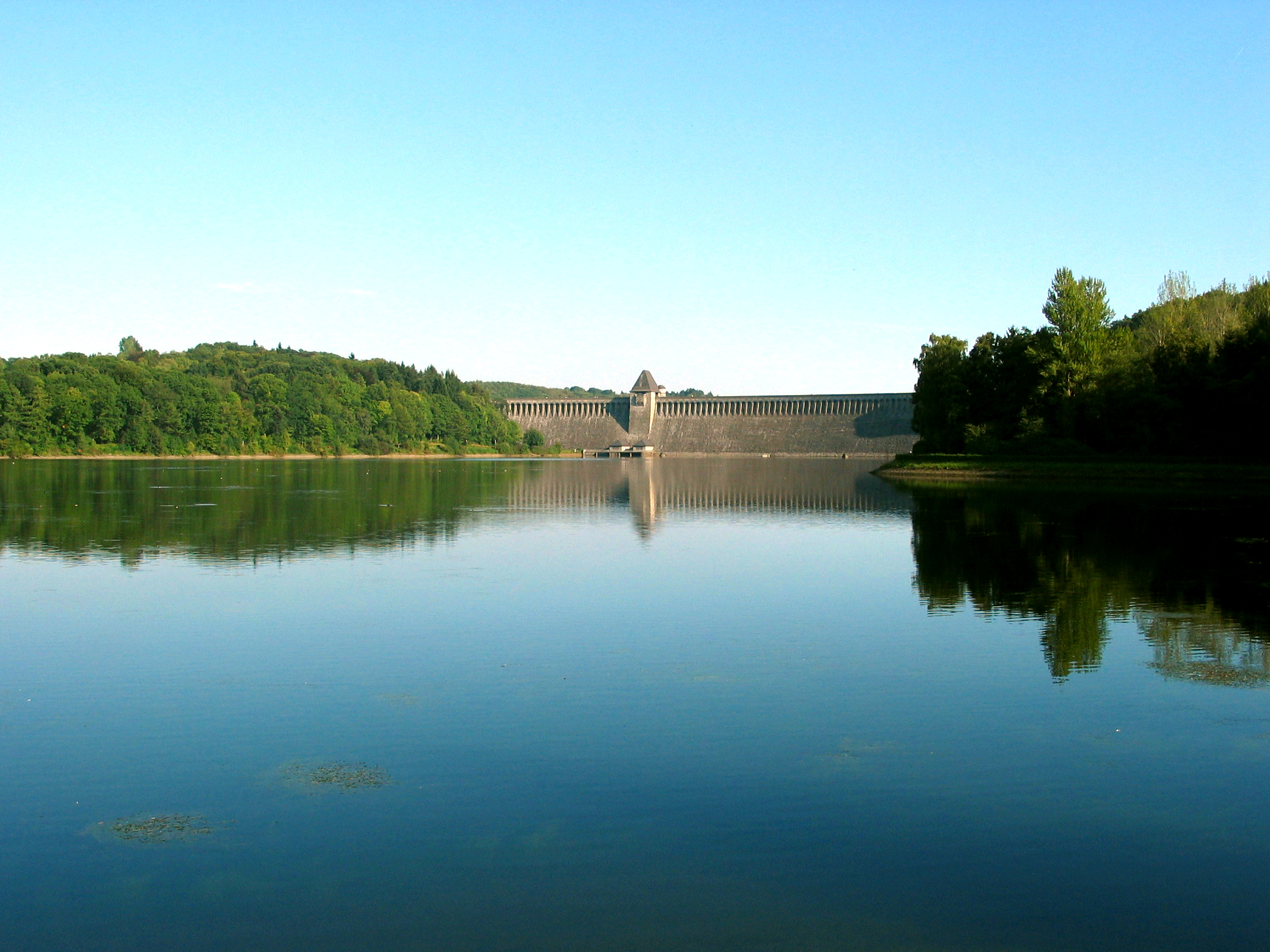
- Möhne Reservoir

- Coat of arms

- Location of Möhnesee within Soest district
- Interactive map of Möhnesee
- Location within Germany Location within North Rhine-Westphalia
- Coordinates: 51°29′45″N 08°07′50″E
- Country: Germany
- State: North Rhine-Westphalia
- Admin. region: Arnsberg
- District: Soest
- Subdivisions: 18

Government
  - Mayor (2020–25): Maria-Luise Moritz (Ind.)

Area
  - Total: 123.51 km^{2} (47.69 sq mi)
- Elevation: 226 m (741 ft)

Population (2025-12-31)
  - Total: 10,483
  - Density: 84.876/km^{2} (219.83/sq mi)
- Time zone: UTC+01:00 (CET)
  - Summer (DST): UTC+02:00 (CEST)
- Postal codes: 59519
- Dialling codes: 02924, 02925 (Brüllingsen, Ellingsen, Völlinghausen)
- Vehicle registration: SO
- Website: www.moehnesee.de

Möhnesee (German pronunciation: [ˈmøːnəˌzeː]) is a municipality in the district of Soest, in North Rhine-Westphalia, Germany.

== Geography ==
The Möhnesee municipality is situated around the Möhne Reservoir (hence the name), approx. 10 km south of Soest.

== History ==
On the night of the 16/17 May 1943, the Dam which contains the Mohnesee was breached in an attack by Avro Lancaster Bombers of 617 Squadron of the British Royal Air Force, the "Dambusters".

In the 1980s the Möhnesee hosted the Campingkirche.

=== Neighboring municipalities ===
- Arnsberg
- Bad Sassendorf
- Ense
- Soest
- Warstein

== Population ==
Historical population

Year	Pop.	±% p.a.
1965	6,899	—
1970	7,579	+1.90%
1975	8,637	+2.65%
1980	9,182	+1.23%
1985	9,106	−0.17%
1990	9,104	−0.00%
1995	10,114	+2.13%

Year	Pop.	±% p.a.
2000	11,093	+1.87%
2005	11,428	+0.60%
2010	11,393	−0.06%
2015	11,608	+0.37%
2020	11,698	+0.15%
2025	10,483	−2.17%

Source: Landesdatabank Nordrhein-Westfalen

== Notable places ==
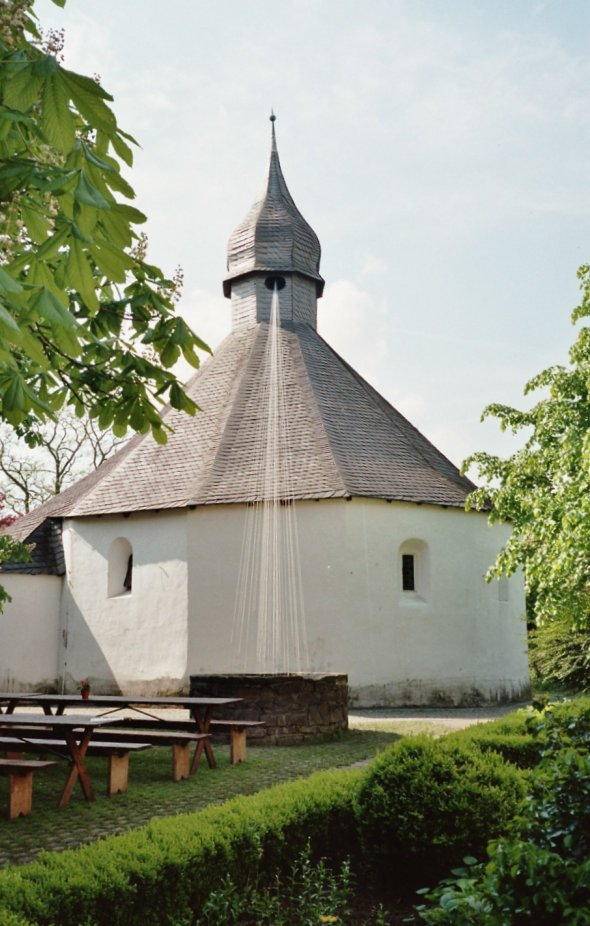
The chapel of Möhnesee-Drüggelte

The Drueggelter Kapelle can be found at Möhnesee-Drüggelte. It is consecrated to the Holy Cross.

== Subdivisions ==
The municipality Möhnesee contains the following 18 subdivisions, with Körbecke as the largest:

- Berlingsen
- Buecke
- Brüllingsen
- Brüningsen
- Delecke
- Echtrop
- Ellingsen
- Günne
- Hewingsen
- Körbecke
- Neuhaus
- Stockum
- Südufer
- Theiningsen
- Völlinghausen
- Wamel
- Westrich
- Wippringsen
