= Albert Engel =

Albert Engel may refer to:

- Albert J. Engel (1888–1959), American politician
- Albert J. Engel Jr. (1924–2013), American judge
- Albert Engel (bishop) (died 1500), German Roman Catholic bishop
