= Johannes Schulte =

German Roman Catholic prelate

Most Reverend Johannes Fabri
- Auxiliary Bishop of Paderborn; Titular Bishop of Syra
- Church: Catholic Church
- Diocese: Diocese of Mainz
- In office: 1437–1458
- Previous post: Auxiliary Bishop of Paderborn (1455–1466)

Personal details
- Died: 15 June 1489 Mainz, Germany

Johannes Schulte, O.S.A. (died 1489) was a Roman Catholic prelate, who served as Auxiliary Bishop of Mainz (1466–1489) and Auxiliary Bishop of Paderborn (1455–1466).

== Biography ==
Johannes Fabri was ordained a priest in the Order of Saint Augustine. On 13 Oct 1455, he was appointed during the papacy of Pope Callixtus III as Auxiliary Bishop of Paderborn and Titular Bishop of Syra. On 23 Oct 1466, he was appointed during the papacy of Pope Paul II as Auxiliary Bishop of Mainz. He served as Auxiliary Bishop of Mainz until his death on 15 Jun 1489. While bishop, he was the principal co-consecrator of Johann von Bayern, Bishop of Munster (1459).

== External links and additional sources ==
- Cheney, David M. "Diocese of Mainz". Catholic-Hierarchy.org. (for Chronology of Bishops) ^{[self-published]}
- Chow, Gabriel. "Diocese of Mainz (Germany)". GCatholic.org. (for Chronology of Bishops) ^{[self-published]}
