= Bertrando d'Arvazzano =

Bishop

Bertrando d'Arvazzano (born in Italy) was an Italian clergyman and bishop/prince for the Roman Catholic Archdiocese of Paderborn. He was ordained in 1399. He resigned in 1400.
