= Johannes Fabri (bishop of Paderborn) =

Roman Catholic Bishop of Paderborn (1437–1458)

Most Reverend Johannes Fabri
- Auxiliary Bishop of Paderborn; Titular Bishop of Larissa in Syria
- Church: Catholic Church
- Diocese: Diocese of Paderborn
- In office: 1437–1458

Personal details
- Died: 1458 Paderborn, Germany

Johannes Fabri, O.F.M. (died 1458) was a Roman Catholic prelate who served as Auxiliary Bishop of Paderborn (1437–1458).

== Biography ==
Johannes Fabri was ordained a priest in the Order of Friars Minor. On 13 Sep 1437, he was appointed during the papacy of Pope Eugene IV as Auxiliary Bishop of Paderborn and Titular Bishop of Larissa in Syria. He served as Auxiliary Bishop of Paderborn until his death in 1458. In his will, Fabri provided his library and funding to found a trilingual college at the University of Vienna.
