= Hans-Josef Becker =

German Roman Catholic archbishop (born 1948)

His Excellency Hans-Josef Becker
- Archbishop Emeritus of Paderborn
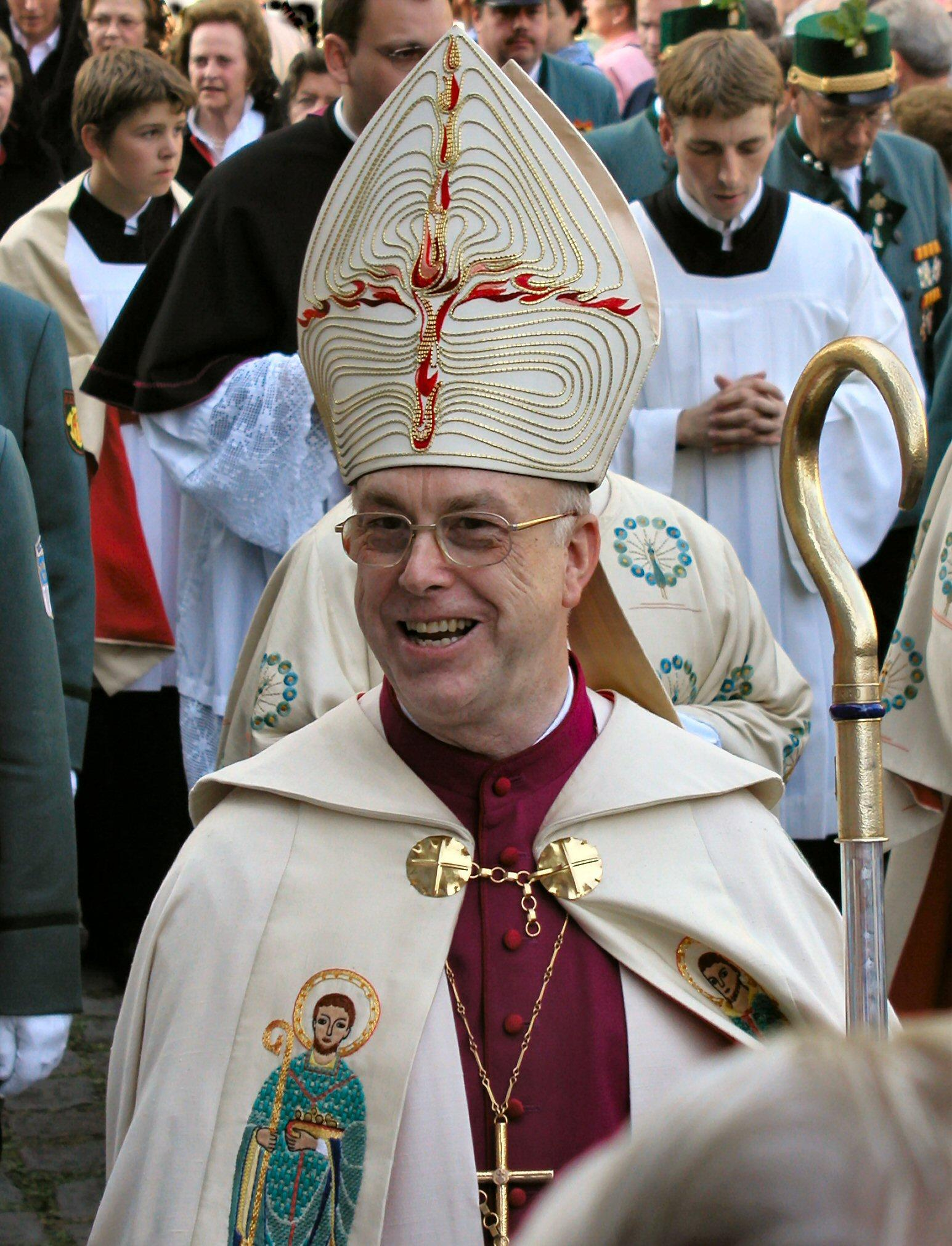
- Archbishop Hans-Josef Becker
- Church: Roman Catholic
- Archdiocese: Archdiocese of Paderborn
- Province: Paderborn
- Appointed: 3 July 2003
- Installed: 28 September 2003
- Term ended: 1 October 2022
- Predecessor: Johannes Joachim Degenhardt
- Previous post: Auxiliary bishop of Paderborn (1999–2003)

Orders
- Ordination: 11 June 1977 by Johannes Joachim Degenhardt
- Consecration: 23 January 2000 by Johannes Joachim Degenhardt

Personal details
- Born: 8 June 1948 (age 78) Warstein, Allied-occupied Germany
- Motto: In Verbo Autem Tuo
- Coat of arms: Hans-Josef Becker's coat of arms

Hans-Josef Becker (born 8 June 1948) is a German prelate of the Catholic Church who was the archbishop of Paderborn in Germany from 2003 to 2022.

== Life ==
Hans Josef Becker was born in Belecke, Warstein, Germany, on 8 June 1948. He completed his advanced level examination in 1967, in Rüthen. Subsequently, he completed a teaching study, which was confirmed with a second state examination in 1972. There after, he studied theology and philosophy in Paderborn and Munich. On 11 June 1977 he was ordained to the priesthood by Archbishop Johannes Joachim Degenhardt.

Styles of Hans-Josef Becker
- Reference style: The Most Reverend
- Spoken style: Your Excellency
- Religious style: Monsignor

From 1979 to 1995, he worked as a pastor in Paderborn and Lippstadt. In the following four years, Becker led the Central Department of Pastoral Personnel (Zentralabteilung Pastorales Personal) for the Archbishopric of Paderborn. In 1999, he was appointed the auxiliary bishop of Paderborn by Pope John Paul II. After the death of Archbishop Degenhardt in the year 2002, Becker functioned for about a year as more of a diocesan administrator, before he was appointed as Archbishop of Paderborn on 28 September 2003.

Since 2006, Becker has been a chairman of the Commission for Education and Schools in the Conference of the German Bishops.

Pope Francis accepted his resignation on 1 October 2022.

== Literature ==
- Manfred, Grothe (31 March 2004). Auf dein Wort hin: Amtseinführung von Erzbischof Hans-Josef Becker [On Your Word: The Inauguration of Archbishop Hans-Josef Becker] (in German). Paderborn: Bonifatius GmbH. ISBN 3-89710-281-1.

== Sources ==
Translated from the German Wikipedia (24 March 2007)

Catholic Church titles
Preceded by Johannes Joachim Degenhardt	Archbishop of Paderborn; 2003–2022	Succeeded by Udo Marcus Bentz
