= Rembert of Kerssenbrock =

German clergyman

Rembert of Kerssenbrock (born 1474 in Bruch, Rhineland-Palatinate) was a German clergyman and bishop/prince for the Roman Catholic Archdiocese of Paderborn. He was ordained in 1547. He was appointed bishop in 1547. He died in 1568.
