= Badurad =

Badurad (died 17 September 862) was the bishop of Paderborn from 815 until his death.

Badurad was born into the Saxon nobility during the Saxon Wars (772–804). He was educated in the cathedral of Würzburg. He succeeded Bishop Hathumar, who died on 9 August 815. At Badurad's request, on 2 April 822, the emperor Louis the Pious granted ecclesiastical immunity to the cathedral of Paderborn. On 25 August that same year, he consecrated the high altar of the Abbey of Corvey and gave the abbey its name, Corbeia in Latin. In June 829, he attended the Council of Mainz in Saint Alban's Abbey. He was high in the emperor's confidence. When Abbot Hilduin of Saint-Denis was sentenced to internal exile in 830, he was sent to Paderborn. Around 832, Louis sent Badurad to Corvey as royal emissary. He remained loyal to Louis during the rebellion of 833. According to Thegan of Trier, the emperor sent him to negotiate with his rebellious son Lothar in 834.

In 835, Badurad was one of the judges in the trial of Ebbo. On 25 October that year, he was present for the transfer of the relics of Saint Quentin to the abbey church under Abbot Hugh. In 836, he acquired for his church relics of Saint Liborius from the diocese of Le Mans. They arrived in Paderborn on 28 May, while the bishop was staying at the imperial palace in Thionville. At the same time, the bishops concluded "a pact of charity and eternal fraternity" between their sees. An account of these events, the Translatio sancti Liborii, records Badurad's reason for seeking relics: "since ... the mass of commoners had been torn away from error towards becoming righteous people with the greatest difficulty—[and were still] secretly turning themselves to the practice of certain ancestral superstitions—[Badurad] realised that if he ordered the body of a saint to be carried there, a great number of the inhabitants, persuaded by the manifestation of miracles (as customarily occur) and by the grace of healings, would begin to worship". At some point, Badurad also acquired relics of Saint Landelin from the diocese of Cambrai.

Badurad is the hero of the Translatio, which describes him as a familiaris of Louis the Pious, a member of the extended imperial household. In June 838, he attended an imperial placitum at Nijmegen. Following Louis's death and the outbreak of civil war, he sided with Lothar. He attended the synod at Ingelheim that rehabilitated Ebbo in August 840. He remained with Lothar and as a result temporarily lost control of his church. In November 840, Louis the German held an assembly in Paderborn in his absence. Badurad was less politically involved in his later years. He attended the councils of Mainz (847) and Mainz (852). Hrabanus Maurus addressed a poem to him. The date of his death, 17 September, is recorded in the necrologies of both the cathedral and the monastery of Abdinghof. He died in the 48th year of his pontificate, in 862.

== Sources ==
- Depreux, Philippe (1997). Prosopographie de l'entourage de Louis le Pieux (781–840) (PDF). Sigmaringen: Jan Thorbecke.
- Flierman, Robert (2017). Saxon Identities, AD 150–900. Bloomsbury.
- Goldberg, Eric J. (2006). Struggle for Empire: Kingship and Conflict under Louis the German, 817–876. Cornell University Press.
- Noble, T. F. X., ed. (2009). Charlemagne and Louis the Pious: The Lives by Einhard, Notker, Ermoldus, Thegan and the Astronomer. Pennsylvania State University Press.
- Shuler, Eric (2010). "The Saxons Within Carolingian Christendom: Post-Conquest Identity in the Translationes of Vitus, Pusinna and Liborius" (PDF). Journal of Medieval History. 36: 39–54.
