= Simon III, Bishop of Paderborn =

Simon III, Bishop of Paderborn (born 1430, died 1498 in Dringenburg) was a German clergyman and bishop/prince for the Roman Catholic Archdiocese of Paderborn. He was ordained in 1463. He was appointed bishop in 1463. He died in 1498.
