= Dietrich IV, Bishop of Paderborn =

Dietrich IV, Bishop of Paderborn (born 1546 in Waterlappe) was a German clergyman and bishop/prince for the Roman Catholic Archdiocese of Paderborn. He was ordained in 1585. He was appointed bishop in 1585. He died in 1618. He was a part of the House of Fürstenberg (Westphalia).
