= Caspar Klein =

Catholic archbishop in Nazi-era Germany

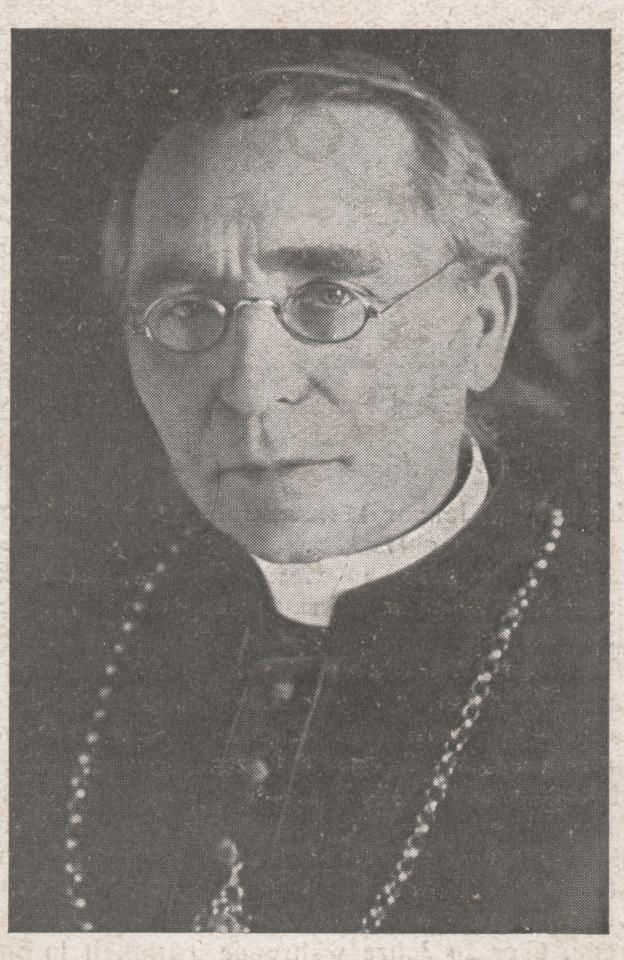
Archbishop Klein

Caspar Klein (born 28 August 1865 in Elben; died 25 January 1941) was a Catholic Archbishop of Paderborn, Germany, during the Nazi era.

As Archbishop of Paderborn in the 1930s, Klein protested the anti-Christian propaganda put out by the Nazis. Documents prepared by the American OSS, and used in evidence at the Nuremberg Trials, record that the Nazis were cautious with regard to the murder of church leaders, and conscious of not wanting to create martyrs. Nevertheless, Catholic leaders frequently faced violence or the threat of violence, particularly at the hands of the SA, the SS or Hitler Youth. A number of cases were cited by the OSS, including one against Archbishop Klein of Paderborn.

== See also ==
- Nazi persecution of the Catholic Church
- Catholic resistance to Nazism
