= Franz Egon von Fürstenberg (1737–1825) =

German Roman Catholic clergyman

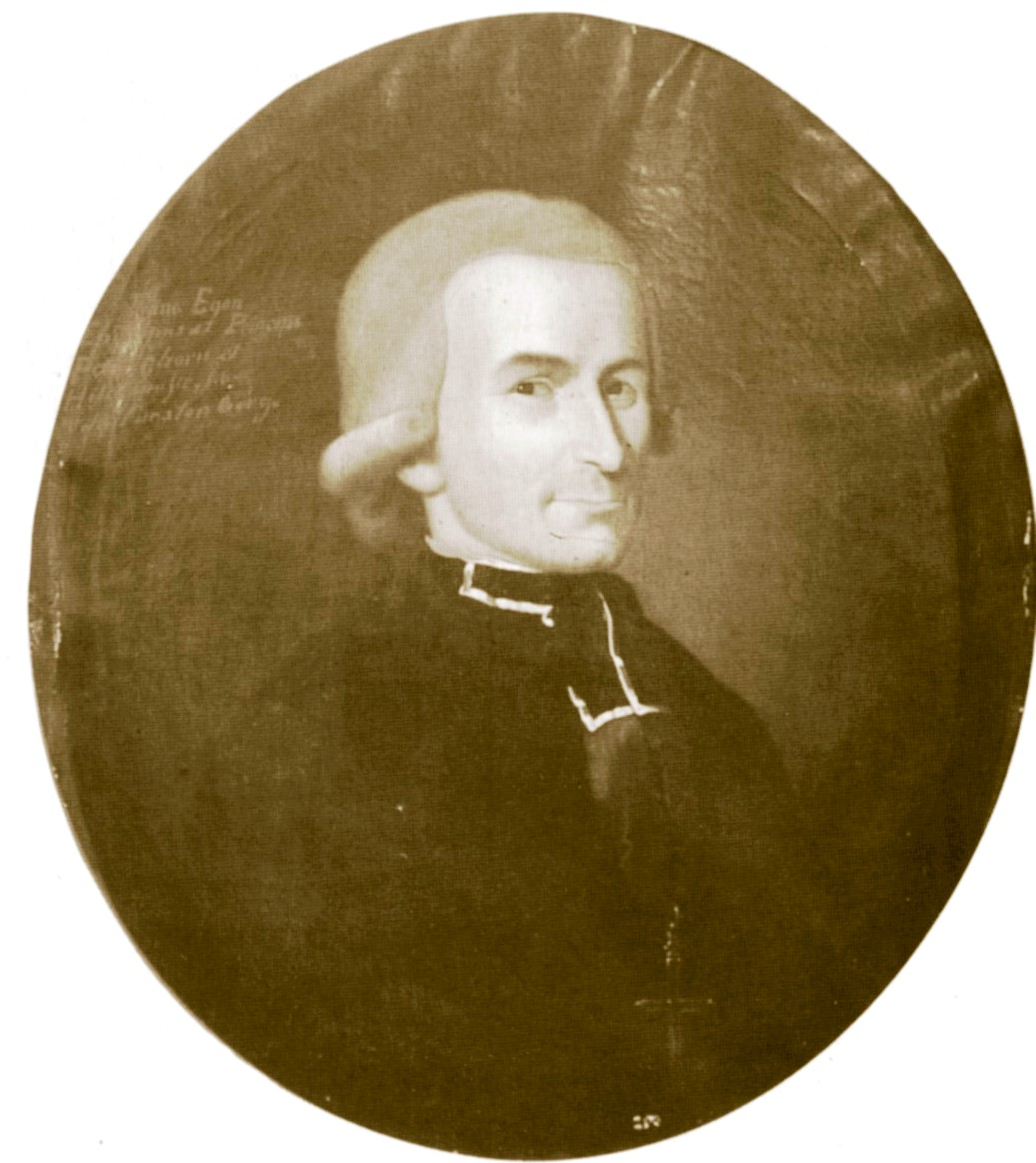
Egon in 1790

Franz Egon Freiherr von Fürstenberg (10 May 1737, Schloss Herdringen, near Arnsberg - 11 August 1825, Hildesheim) was a German Roman Catholic clergyman. He was the last Prince-Bishop of Hildesheim and Prince-Bishop of Paderborn from 1789 until their dissolution in 1803 and 1802.

== Life ==
=== Early life ===
As a younger son of Christian Franz Theodor von Furstenberg and his third wife Anna Helene von Galen, he was intended for a church career from birth and schooled at home by a private tutor before attending the Dreikönigsgymnasium in Cologne. Next he studied at the University of Cologne and the University of Mainz before completing his studies with a stay in Rome from 1761 to 1763. His education was strongly influenced by Jesuit teachers and professors and did not bring him into much contact with Enlightenment ideas.

Aged only eleven he was appointed a canon of Halberstadt in 1748 and in 1764 a canon of Münster and Hildesheim. He was appointed a court councilor in 1768 and dean the following year. In 1776 he became a 'Dompropst' or ordained canon as well as Vicar General. At the same time he became a privy councilor and president of the council and held important secular positions within the prince-bishopric of Hildesheim. When the Prince Bishop Frederick William of Westphalia fell ill, von Furstenberg had a good chance of becoming coadjutor (with a right to succeed Frederick William) thanks to his position and thanks to Prussian support. Competing with Friedrich Moritz von Brabeck (who was supported by the Spiegel family from Sauerländ among others), von Furstenberg was made coadjutor of Hildesheim on 7 March 1786. Though this role was limited to Hildesheim, its confirmation in Paderborn was merely a formality. On 27 January 1788 von Furstenberg was consecrated a bishop in Hildesheim Cathedral and on Frederick William's death succeeded him in both bishoprics.

=== Limited reforms ===
The situation in Paderborn was unfavorable - it was in the midst of a major financial crisis and von Fürstenberg thus renounced the usual expensive festivities to welcome a new prince-bishops. However, this gained him the reputation of a miser among his subjects, who continued to oppose his attempted financial reforms. He made attempts to reduce the two bishoprics' debts, outstanding since the Seven Years' War, but the War of the First Coalition rapidly put an end to them. The poor financial situation also limited attempts by several parties in the prince-bishopric to promote trade - von Fürstenberg slightly loosened the previously strict restrictions relating to the trade guilds and promoted a more rational forestry policy, though the latter had little impact. His school reforms had a more lasting impact and were partly modeled on those of his brother Franz Friedrich Wilhelm von Furstenberg in the Prince-Bishopric of Munster. Franz's reforms put in place a new system of schools, teaching and teacher training as well as replacing Latin with German as the main language in which students were taught.

The overall economic position continued to be poor, however, leading to little lasting change and increasing criticism and rebelliousness against the prince-bishop. Hildesheim in particular became particularly tense, influenced by reports of the French Revolution. von Furstenberg made some peaceful attempts to resolve this but also used his troops to suppress riots if necessary - since he did not have enough soldiers himself he resorted to using troops from neighbouring Hesse.

=== Secularisation ===
The end of the Holy Roman Empire and the secularisation of the prince-bishoprics in 1802 were not entirely unexpected for von Fürstenberg - he attempted to block them both, but also cooperated with the new Prussian authorities. He lost his secular responsibilities but retained his spiritual ones and remained bishop. However, there were later tensions between him and Prussia, for example over whether schools should be under church or state supervision and control. von Fürstenberg gained a new overlord with the foundation of the Kingdom of Westphalia in 1807 and had to take an oath of loyalty to Jerome Bonaparte.

At the end of the Napoleonic Wars in 1815, von Fürstenberg was one of the few surviving reigning bishops - in the peace settlement Paderborn was placed under the overlordship of Prussia and Hildesheim under that of Hanover. In his final years he went to Rome and managed to block Prussian and Hanoverian plans to dissolve the bishoprics of Hildesheim and Paderborn and transfer their responsibilities to the bishops of Osnabrück and Münster respectively. Instead, both bishoprics survived and Paderborn was extended to take on Sauerland (formerly under the control of Cologne) and the former bishoprics of Magdeburg and Halberstadt among others. He died at the prince bishops' residence in Hildesheim, which had been his permanent residence since 1802. He was buried in the central nave of Hildesheim Cathedral.

== Bibliography (in German) ==
- Manfred Wolf: Franz Egon von Fürstenberg (1737–1825). In: Michael Gosmann (Hrsg.): Fürstenberger Skizzen – Streifzüge durch 700 Jahre westfälische Familien und Landesgeschichte. Arnsberg 1995. S.79–82.
- Otto Mejer (1877). "Franz Egon (Bischof von Hildesheim und Paderborn)" . Allgemeine Deutsche Biographie (in German). Vol. 7. Leipzig: Duncker & Humblot. pp. 306–307.
- Klemens Honselmann (1961). "Franz Egon Freiherr von Fürstenberg". Neue Deutsche Biographie (in German). Vol. 5. Berlin: Duncker & Humblot. pp. 365–366. (full text online).
