= Johannes Schneider (bishop) =

Most Reverend Johannes Schneider
- Auxiliary Bishop of Paderborn; Titular Bishop of Tiflis
- Church: Catholic Church
- Archdiocese: Archdiocese of Paderborn
- In office: 1507–1551

Orders
- Consecration: 30 May 1507

Personal details
- Died: 27 March 1551 Paderborn, Germany

Johannes Schneider, O.F.M. (died 1551) was a Roman Catholic prelate who served as Auxiliary Bishop of Paderborn (1507–1551).

== Biography ==
Johannes Schneider ordained a priest in the Order of Friars Minor. On 19 Apr 1507, he was appointed during the papacy of Pope Julius II as Auxiliary Bishop of Paderborn and Titular Bishop of Tiflis. On 30 May 1507, he was consecrated bishop. He served as Auxiliary Bishop of Paderborn until his death on 27 Mar 1551.

== Additional references ==
- Johannes Schneider. In: Ralf Michael Nickel: Zwischen Stadt, Territorium und Kirche: Franziskus’ Söhne in Westfalen bis zum Beginn des Dreißigjährigen Krieges. Dissertation, Universität Bochum 2007, S. 117 (online, PDF; 7,6 MB).
