= Johannes Ymminck =

German bishop (died 1493)

Most Reverend Johannes Ymminck
- Auxiliary Bishop of Paderborn; Titular Bishop of Tiflis
- Church: Catholic Church
- Diocese: Diocese of Paderborn
- In office: 1469–1493
- Previous post: Auxiliary Bishop of Münster (1472–1484)

Orders
- Ordination: by Nikolaus von Tüngen
- Consecration: 24 February 1470

Personal details
- Died: 14 April 1493 Paderborn, Germany

Johannes Ymminck, O.S.A. (died 14 April 1493) was a Roman Catholic prelate who served as Auxiliary Bishop of Paderborn (1469–1493) and Auxiliary Bishop of Münster (1472–1484).

== Biography ==
Johannes Ymminck was ordained a priest in the Order of Saint Augustine. On 10 July 1469, he was appointed during the papacy of Pope Paul II as Auxiliary Bishop of Paderborn and Titular Bishop of Tiflis. On 24 February 1470, he was consecrated bishop by Nikolaus von Tüngen, Bishop of Warmia, with Antonio, Bishop of Civita Castellana e Orte, and Giacomo, Bishop of Sant'Angelo dei Lombardi, serving as co-consecrators.

In 1472, he was appointed during the papacy of Pope Sixtus IV as Auxiliary Bishop of Münster. He served as Auxiliary Bishop of Münster until his resignation in 1484 and as the Auxiliary Bishop of Paderborn until his death on 14 April 1493.

== See also ==
- Catholic Church in Germany
