= Heinrich Vuyst =

German Roman Catholic prelate

Most Reverend Heinrich Vuyst
- Auxiliary Bishop of Paderborn; Titular Bishop of Tiflis
- Church: Catholic Church
- Diocese: Diocese of Paderborn
- In office: 1462

Orders
- Consecration: 25 Jan 1464

Personal details
- Died: 1468 Paderborn, Germany

Heinrich Vuyst, O.F.M. or Heinrich Wust (died 1468) was a Roman Catholic prelate who served as Auxiliary Bishop of Paderborn (1462–1468).

== Biography ==
Heinrich Vuyst was ordained a priest in the Order of Friars Minor. On 31 Dec 1462, he was appointed during the papacy of Pope Pius II as Auxiliary Bishop of Paderborn and Titular Bishop of Tiflis. On 25 Jan 1464 he was consecrated bishop. He served as Auxiliary Bishop of Paderborn until his death in 1468.
