= Archdiocese of Paderborn =

Catholic archdiocese in Germany

Metropolitan Archdiocese of Paderborn Archidioecesis Metropolitae Paderbornensis Metropolitanerzbistum Paderborn

Catholic
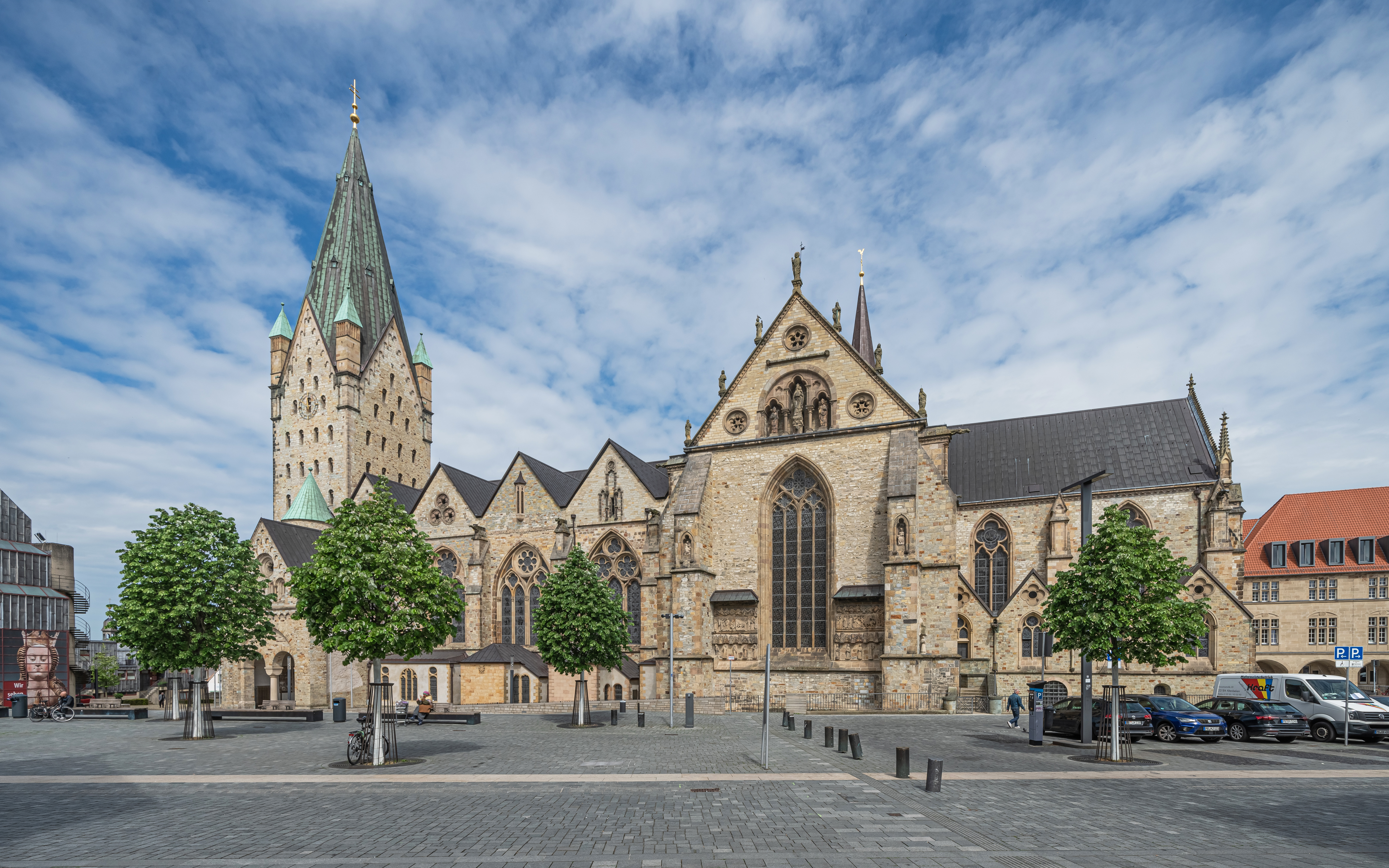
- Paderborn Cathedral

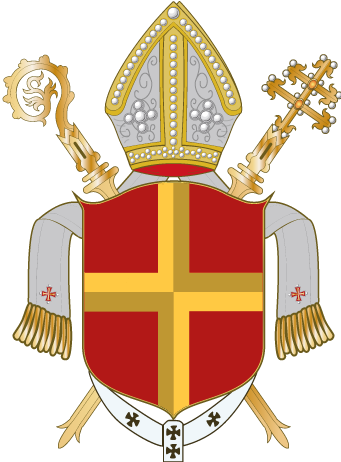
- Coat of arms

Location
- Country: Germany
- Territory: Paderborn, North Rhine-Westphalia
- Ecclesiastical province: Paderborn

Statistics
- Area: 14,750 km^{2} (5,700 sq mi)
- Population: Total; Catholics: (as of 2013); 4,856,342; 1,596,405 (32.9%)

Information
- Denomination: Catholic
- Sui iuris church: Latin Church
- Rite: Roman Rite
- Established: 799
- Cathedral: Paderborn Cathedral
- Patron saint: St. Kilian; St. Liborius

Current leadership
- Pope: Leo XIV
- Archbishop: Udo Marcus Bentz
- Auxiliary Bishops: Matthias König, Josef Holtkotte
- Bishops emeritus: Hans-Josef Becker; Manfred Grothe; Hubert Berenbrinker

Map
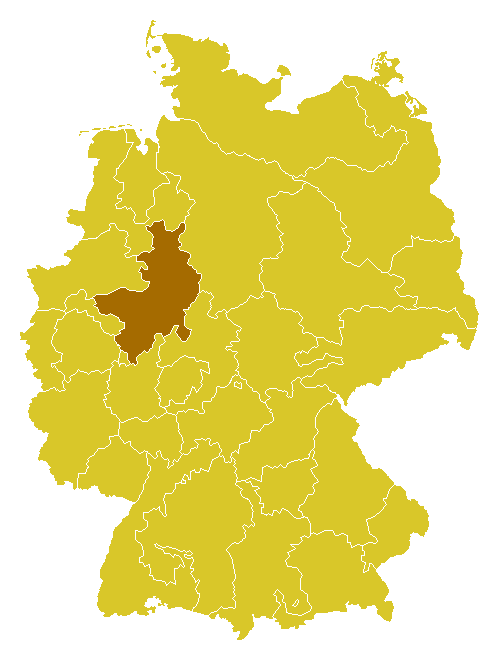

Website
- erzbistum-paderborn.de

The Metropolitan Archdiocese of Paderborn (Latin: Archidioecesis Metropolitae Paderbornensis) is a Latin Church archdiocese of the Catholic Church in Germany; its seat is Paderborn. It was a diocese from its foundation in 799 until 1802, and again from 1821 until 1930. In 1930, it was promoted to an archdiocese. From 1281 until 1802, the Bishopric of Paderborn (German: Fürstbistum Paderborn) was also a state of the Holy Roman Empire.

== History ==
The diocese of Paderborn was founded in 799 by Pope Leo III. In the early years it was subordinated to the bishop of Würzburg. Since 855 the clergy had the right to elect the bishop. The diocese included the larger part of Lippe, Waldeck, and nearly half of the County of Ravensberg.

=== Restoration and later history ===
While the bishopric as a state had been permanently dissolved in 1802, the Diocese of Paderborn, originally suffragan to Mainz Archdiocese (till 1805), was recreated by Pope Pius VII as a suffragan to Cologne Archdiocese in 1821. Through the Prussian Concordate, it was promoted to an archdiocese in 1930, heading the new Middle German Ecclesiastical Province; at the same time, Paderborn lost its districts around Erfurt and Heiligenstadt to the Diocese of Fulda, and two small areas to the Archdiocese of Cologne. The dioceses of Hildesheim and Fulda were made its suffragans.

When the Diocese of Essen was created in 1958, Paderborn lost a significant portion of its district to it.

In the 1980s the Campingkirche was founded.

In 1994 Paderborn lost the part of its district located in the former East Germany to its newly created suffragan Diocese of Magdeburg. Also the new Diocese of Erfurt was made subordinate to Paderborn. At the same time, Hildesheim was made subordinate to the Archdiocese of Hamburg.

In the 1990s, the conflict between the Archdiocese and renegade priest Eugen Drewermann made headlines.

The current archbishop is Hans-Josef Becker.

In April 2008 pope Benedict XVI. announced Hubert Berenbrinker as a new auxiliary bishop.

== Ordinaries ==
=== Bishops to 1321 ===
Image	Name	from	to	Notes
	Hathumar	806	815	
	Badurad	815	862	
	Luithard	862	887	
	Biso	887	900	
	Theoderic I	900	917	
	Unwan	918	935	
	Dudo	935	959	
	Volkmar	959	983	
	Rethar	983	1009	
	Meinwerk	1009	1036	Immedinger
	Rotho	1036	1051	
	Imad	1051	1076	Billunger
	Poppo	1076	1083	
	Henry I	1083	1090	
	Henry II	1084	1127	
	Bernard I	1127	1160	
	Evergis	1160	1178	
	Siegfried	1178	1188	von Hallermund?
	Bernard II	1188	1203	
	Bernard III	1204	1223	
	Thomas Olivier	1223	1225	
	Wilbrand von Oldenburg	1225	1228	
	Bernard IV	1228	1247	
	Simon I	1247	1277	
	Otto von Rietberg	1277	1307	
	Günther I	1307	1310	
	Dietrich II	1310	1321	

=== Archbishops ===
- Franz Egon Freiherr von Fürstenberg † (6 Jan 1789 Succeeded – 1802 Promoted to Archbishop)

=== Bishops ===
- Franz Egon Freiherr von Fürstenberg † (1821 Demoted to Bishop – 11 Aug 1825 Died)
- Friedrich Klemens Freiherr von Ledebur † (10 Nov 1825 Appointed – 30 Aug 1841 Died)
- Richard Kornelius Dammers † (27 Nov 1841 Appointed – 11 Oct 1844 Died)
- Johann Franz Drepper † (11 Jan 1845 Appointed – 5 Nov 1855 Died)
- Konrad Martin † (29 Jan 1856 Appointed – 16 Jul 1879 Died)
- Franz Kaspar Drobe † (24 Mar 1882 Appointed – 7 Mar 1891 Died)
- Hubert Theophil Simar † (25 Jun 1891 Appointed – 24 Oct 1899 Appointed, Archbishop of Köln {Cologne})
- Wilhelm Schneider † (10 May 1900 Appointed – 31 Aug 1909 Died)
- Karl Joseph Schulte † (30 Nov 1909 Appointed – 8 Mar 1920 Appointed, Archbishop of Köln {Cologne})
- Caspar Klein † (30 Apr 1920 Appointed)

=== Archbishops ===
- Caspar Klein (1930 Promoted to archbishop – 26 January 1941 Died)
- Lorenz Jaeger (29 May 1941 Appointed – 30 June 1973 Retired)
- Johannes Joachim Degenhardt (15 March 1974 Appointed – 25 July 2002 Died)
- Hans-Josef Becker (3 July 2003 – 1 October 2022)

== Auxiliary bishops ==
=== Diocese (to 1802) ===
- Johannes Fabri, O.F.M. (1437–1458)
- Johannes Schulte, O.S.A. (1455–1466)
- Heinrich Vuyst (Wust), O.F.M. (1462–1468)
- Johannes Ymminck, O.S.A. (1469–1493)
- Johann Welmecher, O.F.M. (1481–1505)
- Albert Engel (bishop), O.F.M. (1493–1500)
- Johannes Schneider (bishop), O.F.M. (1507–1551)
- Nikolaus Arresdorf, O.F.M. Conv. (1592–1620)
- Johannes Pelking (Pelcking), O.F.M. Conv. (1619–1642)
- Bernhard Frick (1644–1655)
- Pantaleon Bruns, O.S.B. (1721–1727)
- Winimar Knippschild, O.S.B. (1729–1732)
- Meinwerk Kaup, O.S.B. (1733–1745)
- Johann Christoph von Crass (1746–1751)
- Franz Josef von Gondola, O.S.B. (1752–1761)

=== Diocese (1821–1830) ===
- Richard Kornelius Dammers (1824–1842) Appointed, Bishop of Paderborn

=== Archdiocese (1830–present) ===
- Anton Ferdinand Holtgreven (1843–1848)
- Joseph Freusberg (1854–1889)
- Augustinus Göckel (1890–1912)
- Heinrich Hähling von Lanzenauer (1912–1925)
- Johannes Hillebrand (1926–1931)
- Augustinus Philipp Baumann (1932–1953)
- Wilhelm Weskamm (1949–1951)
- Friedrich Maria Heinrich Rintelen (1951–1970)
- Franz Hengsbach (1953–1957)
- Wilhelm Tuschen (1958–1961)
- Paul Heinrich Nordhues (1961–1990)
- Johannes Joachim Degenhardt (1968–1974) Appointed, Archbishop of Paderborn
- Hans-Georg (Johannes) Braun (1970–1973)
- Paul Josef Cordes (1975–1975)
- Paul-Werner Scheele (1975–1979)
- Hubert Berenbrinker (1977–2008)
- Hans Leo Drewes (1980–1997)
- Paul Consbruch (1980–1999)
- Franz-Josef Hermann Bode (1991–1995)
- Heinz Josef Algermissen (1996–2001)
- Reinhard Marx (1996–2001)
- Hans-Josef Becker (1999–2003) Appointed, Archbishop of Paderborn
- Karl-Heinz Wiesemann (2002–2007)
- Manfred Grothe (2004–2015)
- Matthias König (2004– )
- Hubert Berenbrinker (2008-2020)
- Dominicus (Michael) Meier, O.S.B. (2015–2024)

== Structure ==
The archdiocese is allocated in 19 districts (Dekanate).
