= Paderborn Cathedral =

- The Cathedral of Saint Mary, Saint Kilian and Saint Liborius
- Paderborner Dom
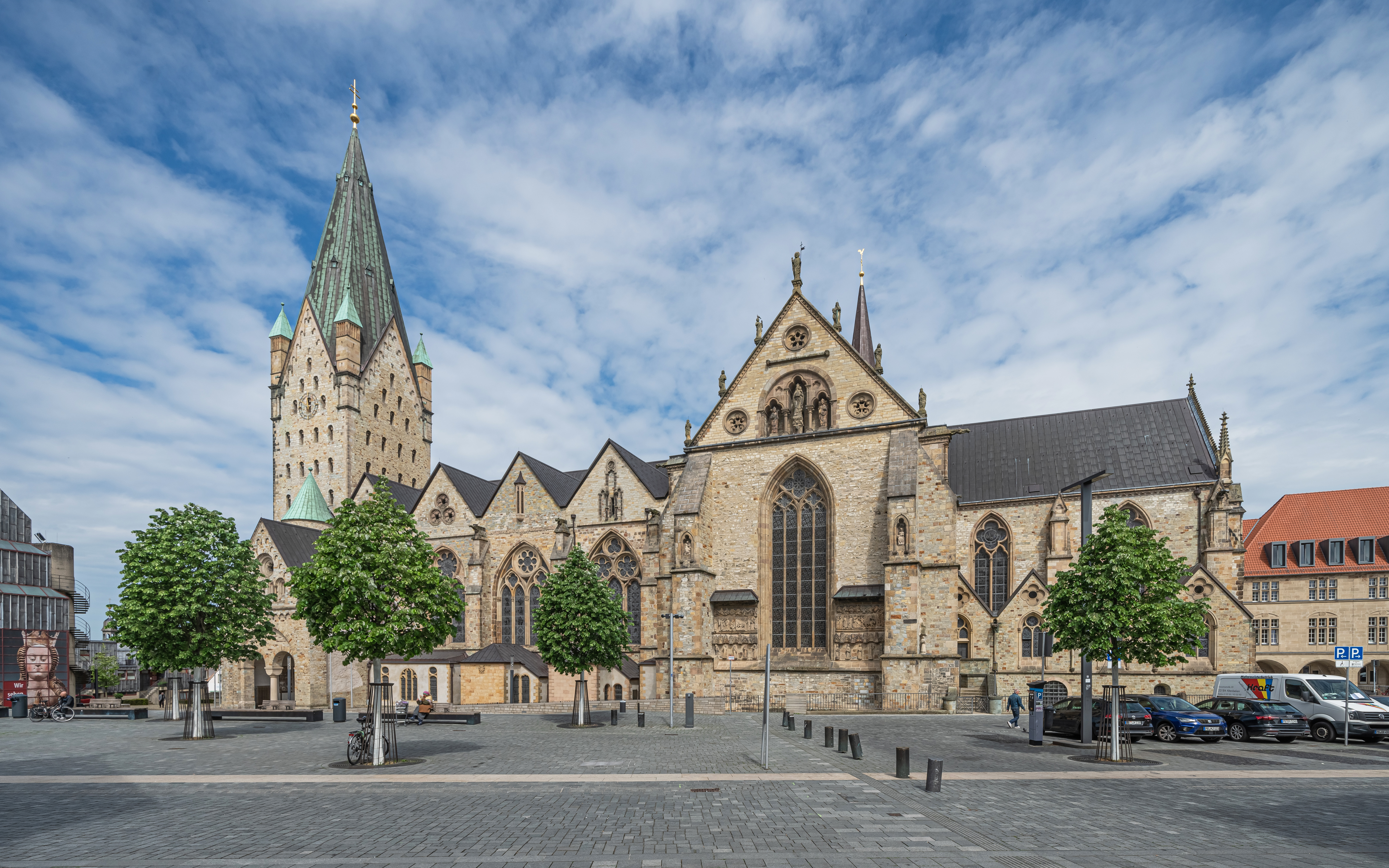
- Paderborn Cathedral
- Paderborn Cathedral
- 51°43′08″N 8°45′20″E
- Location: Paderborn
- Country: Germany
- Denomination: Roman Catholic
- Website: www.dom-paderborn.de

History
- Status: Active
- Founded: 13th century

Architecture
- Functional status: Cathedral
- Style: Romanesque-Gothic

Specifications
- Length: 104 m (341 ft 2 in)
- Width: 52 m (170 ft 7 in)
- Height: 28 m (91 ft 10 in)

Administration
- Archdiocese: Archdiocese of Paderborn

Clergy
- Archbishop: Udo Marcus Bentz

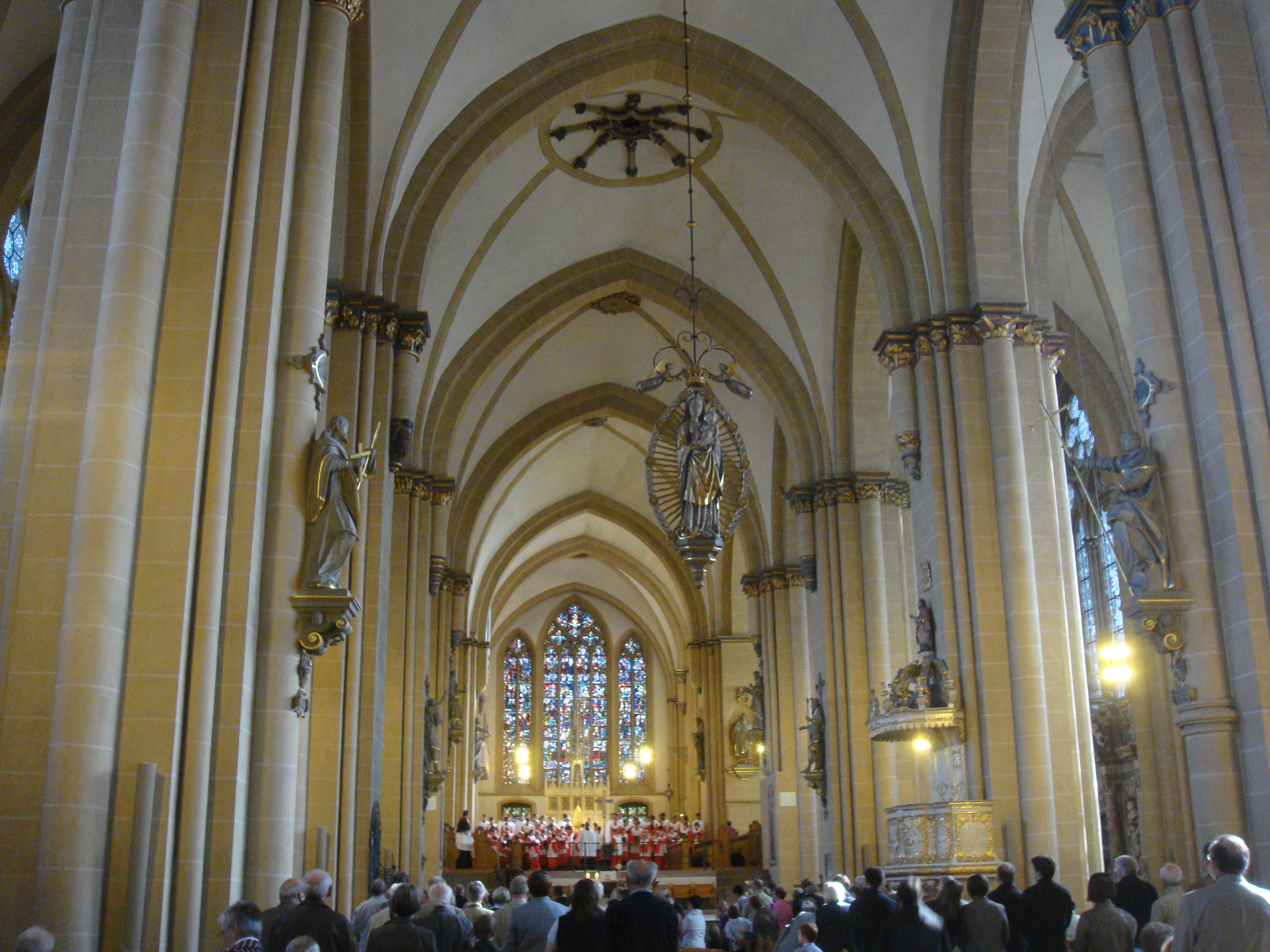
Interior, service with the cathedral choir (Domchor)

Paderborn Cathedral (German: Paderborner Dom) is the cathedral of the Catholic Archdiocese of Paderborn. It is located in the city centre of Paderborn, North Rhine-Westphalia, Germany. The cathedral is dedicated to Saint Mary, Saint Kilian and Saint Liborius. The official German name is Hoher Dom Ss. Maria, Liborius und Kilian.

== History ==
=== Previous structures ===
Today's cathedral is located in a position that has been occupied by churches for hundreds of years. Charlemagne had a Kaiserpfalz built near the sources of the Pader river. As early as 777 this palace had an attached church, dedicated to Christ (Salvator Mundi) and Brigit of Kildare. This church, located north of today's cathedral, served as chapel to the court as well as a basis for missionary work among the Pagan Saxons. Rebellious Saxons repeatedly destroyed this first church. After the locals converted to Christianity, the first cathedral was built. Pope Leo III met Charlemagne at Paderborn in 799 and consecrated an altar to Saint Stephen, depositing some relics of that saint in it. The first cathedral of the newly established bishopric was a three-aisled basilica, dedicated to Mary and Saint Kilian. After the See was initially administered from Würzburg, in 806 Hathumar became the first Bishop of Paderborn.

The second bishop, Badurad, asked the Bishop of Le Mans for the remains of a saint, to help with consolidating the faith of the local Saxons. In 836, the remains of Liborius of Le Mans were handed over to a delegation from Paderborn and translated back to the cathedral. A fire destroyed the first cathedral in 1000 AD. Bishop Ratherius began with rebuilding, but his successor Meinwerk had the previous work destroyed and started over, building a three-aisled church with a transept and crypt in the east. This (second) cathedral was consecrated in 1015, but destroyed in a city fire in 1058. Meinwerk's nephew, Imad had the cathedral rebuilt on a significantly larger scale (third cathedral). This building, with two transepts, already was very similar to today's cathedral. Today's crypt was built around 1100 AD. Similarly, a chapel to St. Bartholomew, connected to the cathedral, would be built after 1015 by Greek monks. Another fire in 1133 damaged the church, but its core survived. Bernhard I. von Oesede had the building strengthened and extended (fourth cathedral); it was reconsecrated in 1144/45.

=== The current cathedral ===
In the 13th century, the cathedral was reconstructed, not due to damage but to bring it up to then current artistic and ecclesial standards. Construction likely began at the western end of the building (late Romanesque basilika, before 1220). The nave followed in the form of a hall church (i.e. with three aisles all reaching to the height of the central roof) in early Gothic style. It was completed in the late 13th century with High Gothic elements.

In the 17th century, Prince-Bishops Dietrich Adolf von der Recke (1601-1661) and Ferdinand von Fürstenberg (1626–1683) replaced the Gothic interior features with Baroque artworks.

In 1930, the Diocese of Paderborn was promoted to Archdiocese.

Repeated Allied bombing of Paderborn in 1945 resulted in severe damage to the cathedral and the loss of irreplaceable works of art, including all the historic glass windows. On 22 March 1945, fourteen people were killed by a blockbuster bomb in the cloister.

Reconstruction took until the 1950s. From 1978 to 1981, a major restoration was undertaken.

== Bells ==
The Tower has total of 10 bells as of 2018. The original set consisted of six bells, which were augmented by two new ones, making a total of eight bells. In 2018, two new bells were added, bringing the total to ten. In Germany, the bells are always numbered from largest to smallest, Bell 1 is always the tenor or bourdon.

| Bell Number (Formerly) | Bell Number (Current) | Bell Name | Year Cast | Weight (KG) |
|---|---|---|---|---|
| | 1 | Christus-Frieden (Bourdon Bell) | 2017 | 13.520 kg |
| 1 (Former Bourdon Bell) | 2 | St. Liborius (2nd Bourdon Bell) | 1951 | 4.740 kg |
| 2 | 3 | Regina Pacis | 1951 | 2.590 kg |
| 3 | 4 | St. Johannes | 1951 | 2.320 kg |
| 4 | 5 | St. Kilian und St. Sturmius | 1951 | 1.600 kg |
| 5 | 6 | St. Meinolph | 1951 | 959 kg |
| 6 | 7 | St. Heinrich | 1951 | 640 kg |
| | 8 | Maria – Trösterin der Betrübten | 2018 | 1.008 kg |
| 7 | 9 | St. Maria | 1984 | ≈ 120 kg |
| 8 | 10 | St. Martha | 1984 | ≈ 80 kg |

== Architecture ==
=== External dimensions ===
- Length: 104 m
- Width: 52 m
- Height: 28 m
- Height of the western tower: 93 m

=== Points of interest ===
- Paradiesportal (Paradise Portal), from the first third of the 13th century. It combines late Romanesque and early Gothic statuary.
- Pietà, from around 1360, probably made in Hesse.
- Alabaster relief showing the veneration of the Magi, made in Nottingham c. 1360.
- Doppelmadonna (Double Madonna), hanging from the ceiling in the nave, from round 1480.
- Reliquienrentabel, the former Gothic high altar (made circa 1420 from light sandstone and designed to hold the St. Libori reliquary shrine, which was stolen in the Thirty Years' War) was replaced in the 17th century by a Baroque high altar (destroyed 1945). It is now once again located in the cathedral's choir.
- Tomb of Bishop Rotho (in office 1036–51), circa 1460.
- Margarethenaltar, the only remaining medieval wooden retable, painted by Gert van Loon (c. 1465–1521).
- Tomb of Prince-Bishop Dietrich IV von Fürstenberg (d. 1618), a Mannerist work made of black and white stone, rising almost 18 m.
- Pulpit in Régence style, white and gold (1736), gifted on the occasion of the 900th anniversary of the translation of Saint Liborius.
- The baptismal font dates only from 1924, but the Mannerist screen surrounding it is from the 17th century.

=== Crypt ===
The relics of Saint Liborius are kept in the three-aisled crypt, which is (with a length of 32 m) one of Germany's largest crypts. Towards the west are the tombs of the Archbishops of Paderborn. An antechamber features a 1935 mosaic on the walls and ceiling and in the centre of the floor the tombstone for Bishop Meinwerk, dating to the 13th century.

=== Window of Three Hares (Dreihasenfenster) ===
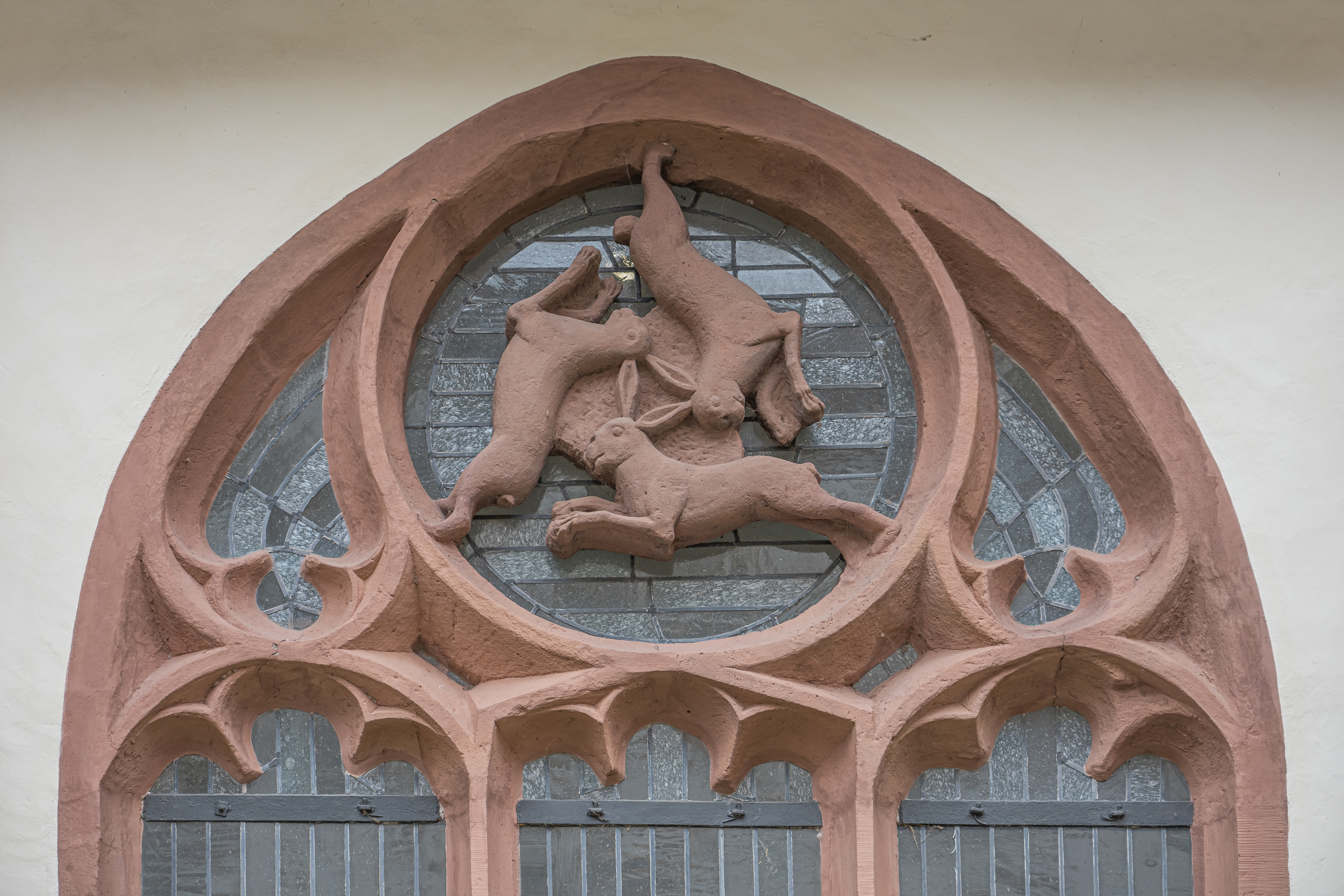
Window of Three Hares (Dreihasenfenster)

One of the cathedral's, and the city's, most recognisable features is the Dreihasenfenster ("Window of Three Hares"). It depicts three hares in motion, arranged in a triangle. Each hare is shown as having two ears, although only three ears are visible in total. The original 16th century carving can be found in the cloister's inner courtyard, and has been duplicated on numerous buildings and a number of shops throughout the city centre.

== Burials ==
- Lorenz Jaeger
- Bernard V of Lippe
