= Liborius of Le Mans =

Bishop of La Mans

Saint Liborius
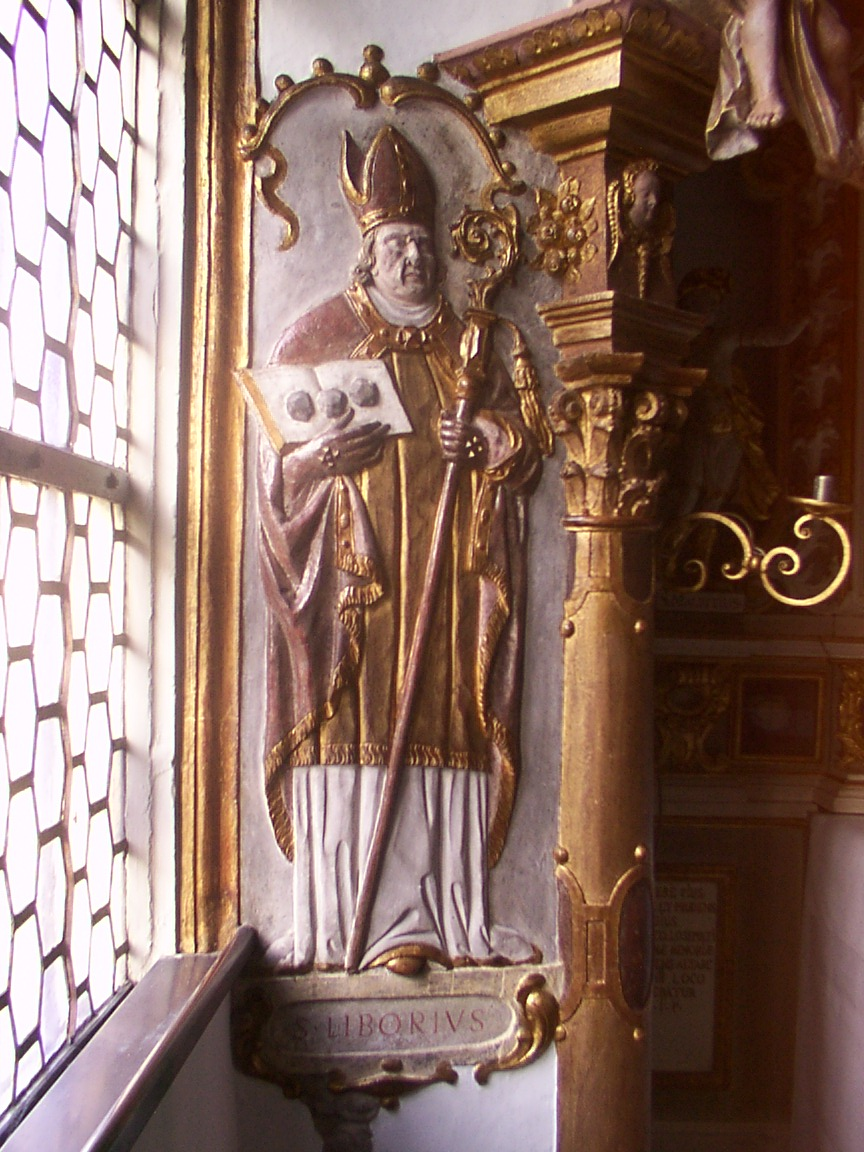
- Saint Liborius, relief in the Trinity Chapel of the Paderborn Cathedral.

Bishop, Confessor, Pastor
- Born: unknown Gaul
- Died: 397; Le Mans (modern-day France)
- Venerated in: Roman Catholic Church; Eastern Orthodox Church
- Major shrine: Paderborn
- Feast: 23 July
- Attributes: Pebbles on a book; peacock; episcopal attire
- Patronage: Against calculi; against colic; against fever; against gall stones; Paderborn Cathedral; Paderborn

Liborius of Le Mans (died 397) was the second Bishop of Le Mans. He is the patron saint of the cathedral and archdiocese of Paderborn in Germany. The year of his birth is unknown; he died in 397, reputedly on 23 July.

== Le Mans and Paderborn ==
As for other fourth-century saints, little is known of his life. He was a Gaul, influenced by Latin culture. He is said to have been Bishop of Le Mans for 49 years. He built some churches in its neighbourhood, an indication that his missionary activity was limited to the Gaul of his time. He is said to have ordained, in the course of 96 ordinations, 217 priests and 186 deacons. Saint Martin of Tours assisted him when he was dying. He was buried in the Apostle Basilica of Le Mans, beside his predecessor, Julian, the founder of the bishopric.

Miracles are said to have occurred at his tomb. In 835 Bishop Aldrich placed some relics of his body into an altar in the cathedral, and in the following year, on the instructions of Emperor Louis the Pious, sent the body to Bishop Badurad of Paderborn, a diocese founded in 799 by Pope Leo III and Emperor Charlemagne that had no saint of its own.

From this arose a "love bond of lasting brotherhood" that has survived all the hostilities of the succeeding centuries and is considered to be the oldest contract still in force. Both churches bound themselves to help each other by prayer and material assistance, as they have in fact done on more than one occasion.

In view of the power that veneration of Saint Liborius has had in binding peoples together, Archbishop Johannes Joachim Degenhardt of Paderborn established in 1977 the Saint Liborius Medal for Unity and Peace, which is conferred every five years on someone who has contributed to the unity of Europe on Christian principles.

== Patronage and symbology ==
Since Liborius died in the arms of his friend Martin of Tours, he is looked to as a patron of a good death. Since the thirteenth century he is prayed to for assistance against gallstones that are caused by the water of the limestone area; the first account of a healing of this kind concerns the cure of Archbishop Werner von Eppstein, who came on pilgrimage to the saint's shrine in 1267. This is the origin of the saint's attribute of three stones placed on a copy of the Bible. In the same period he became the patron of the cathedral and the archdiocese, rather than the Blessed Virgin Mary and Saint Kilian, who were previously in first place. And as stated above, he is seen as a patron of peace and understanding among peoples. He is invoked against colic, fever, and gallstones.

As well as being shown as a bishop carrying small stones on a book, Saint Liborius is also shown with the attribute of a peacock, because of a legend that, when his body was brought to Paderborn, a peacock guided the bearers.

The popularity of the saint in Paderborn is shown in the week-long yearly festival that begins on the Saturday after his 23 July feast day.

== Liturgy ==
St Liborius is a recognized saint of the Roman Catholic Church, but his feast day was not included in the Tridentine calendar. It was added in 1702 as a commemoration within the 23 July celebration of Saint Apollinaris of Ravenna. The 1969 Mysterii Paschalis revision judged that he was not of sufficient universal importance for insertion in the General Roman Calendar and that it should be left to local calendars to include him.

== Legacy ==
=== Libori Festival ===
Libori is a festival in Paderborn, Germany, in honour of Saint Liborius, which takes place annually in the last week of July.

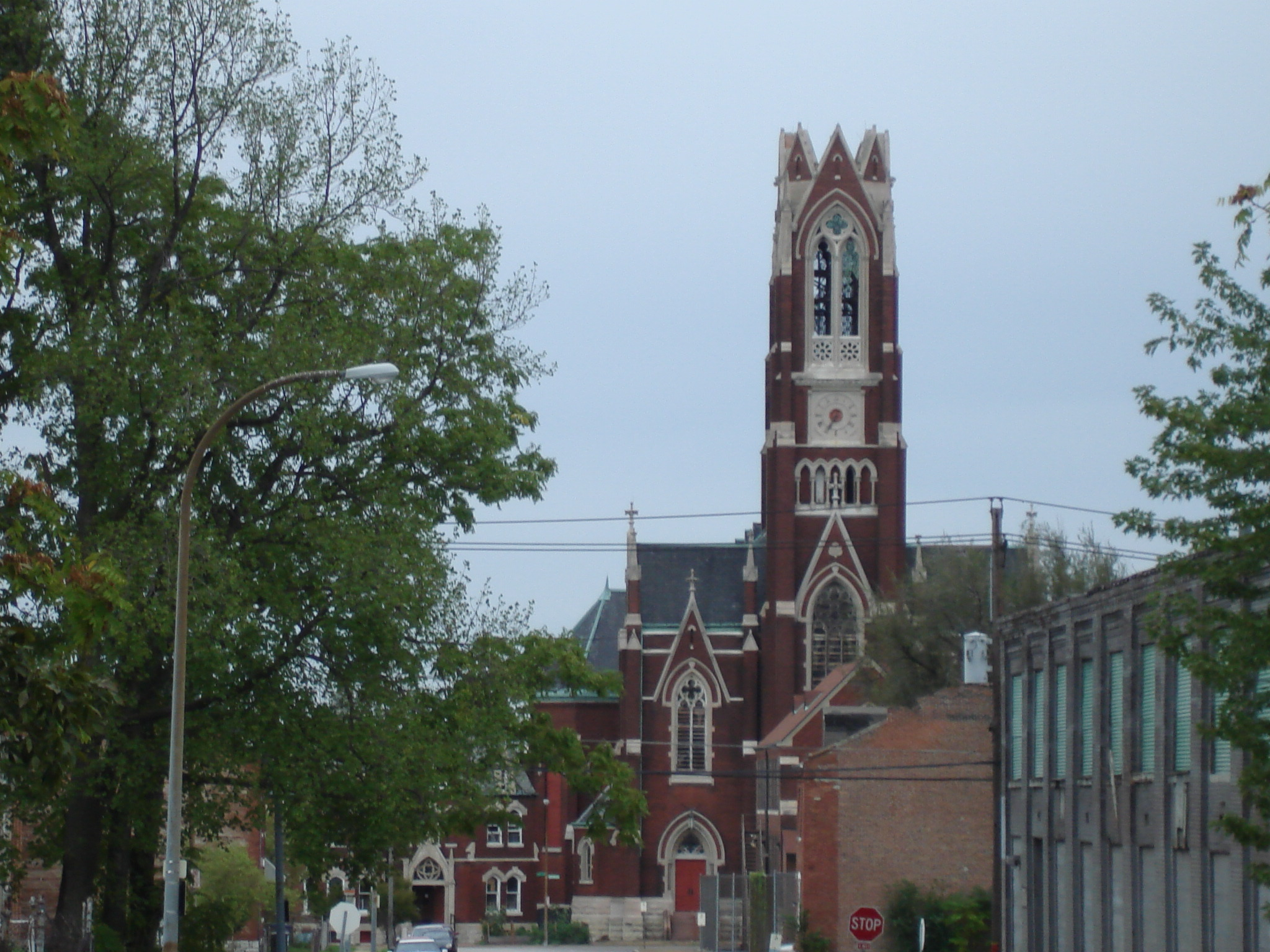
St. Liborius Church in St. Louis, Missouri (2012)

.Dedicated parishes are located in:

=== Australia ===
- Eaglehawk, Victoria, Australia

=== Europe ===
- Split, Croatia
- Eissen, Germany
- Paderborn, Germany - Paderborn Cathedral
- Colorno, Italy - Ducal Chapel of San Liborio
- Komárom, Hungary
- Nagyszentjános, Hungary
- Rome, Italy - San Liborio, Rome
- Dinxperlo, Netherlands - Protestant church
- Krasnodar, Russia - St. Liborius Church, Krasnodar

=== North America ===
- St. Libory, Illinois, United States
- Steger, Illinois, United States
- St. Louis, Missouri, United States - closed
- St. Libory, Nebraska, United States
- Orient, South Dakota, United States
