= Campingkirche =

Church service during summer holiday

Campingkirche is a German term for church service during summer holiday. The Lutheran and Roman Catholic churches in Germany offer spiritual guidance and church services on campsites. Some have existed for more than 30 years.
