= Albert Engel (bishop) =

German Roman Catholic bishop

Most Reverend Albert Engel
- Auxiliary Bishop of Paderborn; Titular Bishop of Tiflis
- Church: Catholic Church
- Archdiocese: Archdiocese of Paderborn
- In office: 1493–1500

Orders
- Consecration: 1 May 1493 by Tito Veltri de Viterbe

Personal details
- Died: 18 November 1500 Paderborn, Germany

Albert Engel, O.F.M. (died 1500) was a Roman Catholic prelate who served as Auxiliary Bishop of Paderborn (1493–1500).

== Biography ==
Albert Engel was ordained a priest in the Order of Friars Minor. On 18 Apr 1493, he was appointed during the papacy of Pope Alexander VI as Auxiliary Bishop of Paderborn and Titular Bishop of Tiflis. On 1 May 1493, he was consecrated bishop by Tito Veltri de Viterbe, Bishop of Castro del Lazio, with Matteo Giudici, Bishop of Penne e Atri, and Raimundo de Loaria, Bishop of Dolia, serving as co-consecrators. He served as Auxiliary Bishop of Paderborn until his death on 18 Nov 1500.
