= Udo Marcus Bentz =

German Catholic Archbishop

Coat of arms of Udo Marcus Bentz, archbishop of Paderborn

Coat of arms of Udo Marcus Bentz

Udo Marcus Bentz (born 3 March 1967) is a German prelate of the Catholic Church who served as metropolitan archbishop of Paderborn since 2024. He was an auxiliary bishop in Mainz from 2015 to 2023.

== Biography ==
Udo Marcus Bentz was born in Rülzheim on 3 March 1967. He trained from 1986 to 1988 as a banker. In 1988, he entered the diocesan seminary in Mainz and studied theology and philosophy at the University of Mainz and the University of Innsbruck. He was ordained a deacon in 1994 and served his internship in Griesheim. He was ordained a priest for the diocese of Mainz on 1 July 1995 by Bishop Karl Lehmann.

From 1995 to 1998 he worked as a chaplain in the cathedral of St. Peter and at St. Martin parish in Worms. He spent the next four years as personal secretary as Lehmann's personal secretary. After further studies he joined Albert Raffelt at the Albert-Ludwigs-University Freiburg in 2007 working toward a doctorate in theology and history. His dissertation received the Karl Rahner Prize from the University of Innsbruck in 2008. He was pastorally active in the parishes of St. Michael in Sprendlingen (2002–2004) and of St. Peter Canisius in Mainz-Gonsenheim (2004–2007). Beginning in 2007, he was rector of the diocesan seminary in Mainz. In 2011, he was appointed to the spiritual ministry by the Bishop of Mainz. In 2013, Bentz was elected chairman of the German Rectors' Council. In addition to teaching at diocesan seminaries, he began teaching at the seminaries for pastoralists and pastoral assistants of the diocese in 2014.

On 15 July 2015, Pope Francis named him an auxiliary bishop of Mainz. He received his episcopal consecration on 20 September from Cardinal Karl-Josef Rauber.

On 9 December 2023, Pope Francis appointed him metropolitan archbishop of Paderborn. His installation took place on 10 March 2024.
