= Eugen Drewermann =

German theologian

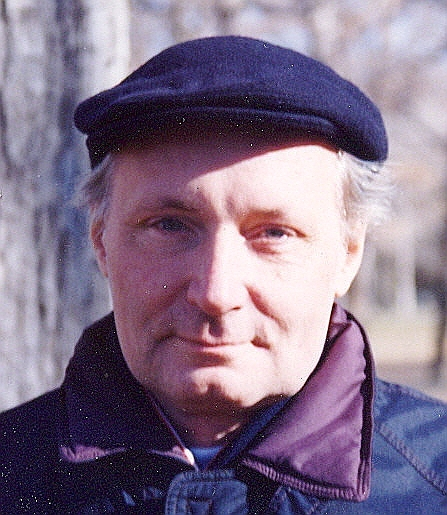
Drewermann during his first US lecture series in 1999

Eugen Drewermann (born 20 June 1940) is a German church critic, theologian, peace activist and former Catholic priest. His work has been translated into more than a dozen languages.

Drewermann was born in Bergkamen near Dortmund. He is best known in Germany for his work toward a non-violent form of Christianity, which, he believes, requires an integration of Depth psychology into Exegesis and Theology. Trained in philosophy, theology, psychoanalysis, and comparative religious studies, he criticized the Roman Catholic Church's literal and biologistic interpretations of miracles, the virgin birth, Ascension, and Resurrection. He called on Rome to understand biblical stories symbolically in such a way that they can become present and healing to readers today. Drewermann's controversial opinions on Catholic dogma, especially the Virgin birth of Jesus lead to a letter expressing "deep worry," in 1986 by Cardinal Ratzinger, later Pope Benedict XVI, to Drewermann's archbishop, Johannes Joachim Degenhardt.

The struggle propelled Drewermann into the public limelight and culminated in 1991 after he published a radical critique of what he considers to be the Vatican's psychologically cruel and mentally enslaving clergy ideal (Kleriker: Psychogramm eines Ideals [Clergy: Psychogram of an ideal]). Archbishop Degenhardt of Paderborn and the Catholic Bishops Conference of Germany engaged in a long drawn-out and heated debate with Drewermann which was closely followed by media and public. As a consequence, on 7 October 1991, the Archbishop disallowed him to teach at the Catholic Seminary of Paderborn and, shortly afterwards, revoked his license to preach in 1992.

Drewermann has uttered strong and controversial political opinions. He was against the Gulf War, the Iraq War, German participation in the NATO war against Afghanistan, and Israeli Air Raids during the 2006 Lebanon War. In the name of the German Peace Movement, he asked to abolish not only Walter Mixa's office as Military Bishop of Germany but the German military, the Bundeswehr, as such. Drewermann has signed public calls to support the Linkspartei and delivers speeches on conferences and protest demonstrations of the left.

Drewermann left the Catholic Church on his 65th birthday on 20 June 2005, a decision he announced on Sandra Maischberger's talk show on German television.

== Early life ==
Son of a Lutheran father and a Catholic mother, Drewermann, after finishing grammar school (Abitur) in Germany, studied philosophy in Münster, theology in Paderborn and psychoanalysis in Göttingen.

== Professional life ==
Ordained as a Catholic priest in 1966, he worked as a diocesan priest, student chaplain, and eventually began work in 1974 as assistant priest in the parish of St. George in Paderborn. At the same time, he worked as a psychotherapist, and from 1979 also held lectures in comparative religious studies and dogmatics at the Catholic Theological Faculty in Paderborn. He continues to hold lectures in Paderborn and talks at other universities.

Influenced by Sigmund Freud, Carl Jung, and more recent psychoanalysts, Drewermann radically reinterprets biblical texts according to psychoanalytic, poetic, and existential criteria. His method of interpretation has been clearly outlined in the 1984–1985 two-volume work Tiefenpsychologie und Exegese. His interpretations are as immediate as poetry and aim to rediscover particularly the therapeutic message of Jesus and of the Hebrew prophets, both for the individual and for society at large.

A central topic of Drewermann is the specific way humans experience Angst (fear) due to our self-reflective capacity. He maintains that religion has as its central task to help calm our human anxiety and to stop its devastating effects on all levels of human life, in its personal, social, and global manifestations. Among his more than 80 books are dozens of titles presenting non-moralistic reinterpretations of nearly all biblical texts, including a monumental three-volume scholarly treatise on Genesis 2–11 (Strukturen des Bösen, 1977-8) and a two-volume commentary on the Gospel of Mark; a number of titles on urgent social issues such as war (Der Krieg und das Christentum, 1981), the environment (Der tödliche Fortschritt, 1982), and burning moral issues such as abortion, the will to live, suicide (Psychoanalyse und Moraltheologie, 1982-4, 3 vols); and, most recently, half a dozen volumes on the question of God in light of the findings of modern anthropology (1998), biology (1999), cosmology (2002), neurology (2006–2007); a depth psychological analysis of more than twenty of the most well-known fairy tales by the Brothers Grimm and one by Hans Christian Andersen.

Since 1992, Drewermann has been working as a freelance author and speaker. He has frequent appearances in German TV talk shows and is invited to lecture all over Germany, Europe, and the world. While his popularity as a church critic was at its maximum when Der Spiegel ran a cover story on him in its 1993 Christmas issue, he continues to be a highly sought-after commentator on spiritual, religious and social issues.

He owned his own monthly call-in radio show titled Redefreiheit (Freedom of Speech) in Bremen Redefreiheit – Nordwestradio – Radio Bremen, which was preceded by a prior regular call-in radio show in Berlin.

Drewermann has appeared twice with the Dalai Lama in Zurich, and has written a book with him on the dialogue among religions. After the 11 September 2001 attacks he described the attacks as the result of complex dynamics in which both sides in the terror war had contributed to the conflict. In agreement with the Dalai Lama, Drewermann called on the West to turn the attacks into an opportunity for peace not revenge.

== Reception ==
In the 1990s, Hans Küng spoke out on behalf of Drewermann who lost his license to teach Catholic theology and was suspended as a priest because he, like Küng, challenged dogmatic structures. Küng delivered the laudatio when Drewermann was awarded the Herbert-Haag-Prize for Freedom in the Church in 1992 at the University of Tübingen.

Some Catholic scholars criticised Drewermann for focusing in his work on individual psychology without taking into consideration Christian communities and Christian tradition, arguing that Drewermann's approach had the effect of reducing the historical relevance of the Gospel and Revelation to a mere collection of texts used to cure individual anxiety. A similar approach to Drewemann's work came from psychological scholars Albert Görres and Helmuth Benesch.

Catholic scholar Klaus Berger accused Drewermann of using outdated ideas and research methods and of subscribing to ancient misunderstandings of the Old Testament. A pseudo Marcionism and using of biblical and other religious texts out of context is pointed out by Protestant scholar Manfred Oeming.

The political views of Drewermann have been sharply criticized by theologians Uwe Birnstein and Klaus-Peter Lehmann as being based on a traditional German antipolitical and romantic view and reducing all social aspects to individual fear and personal understanding and goodwill. Peter Neuhaus, in his comparison of the Political Theology of Johannes Baptist Metz and the theology of Drewermann, counters that Drewermann's theology is imminently social in its critique and does not share in antipolitical or romantic views of politics.

Henryk M. Broder referred to Drewermann and other German intellectuals as reason for a book, in which he denounces Drewermann and others as underplaying the role of Islamic terrorism and putting the blame solely on the west, especially Israel and the US.

Josef Isensee, a Catholic German lawyer and specialist for Constitutional law, sees in Drewermann the prototype of a self-proclaimed church critic using strong opinions to gain profile and public awareness and profiting on the very organizational body he was member for the most time of his life.

== Awards ==
- 1992 Herbert-Haag-Prize (Swiss) for his contribution to a radical reform of the Church.
- 1994 Urania-Medal for his contribution to popular education.
- 2000 Integration Prize of the Apfelbaum Foundation for Co-evolution (Cologne).
- 2007 Erich Fromm Prize, together with Konstantin Wecker, for his work against war and antisemitism.
- 2011 International Albert Schweitzer Prize, together with Raphaela and Rolf Maibach
- 2013 Culture Prize of the Internationale Paulusgesellschaft
- 2013 Medal of Honor of the City of Bergkamen
- 2017 Löwenherz – Honorary Award of the NGO Human Projects
- 2018 Peace Prize of the City of Bautzen (Bautzner Friedenspreis)
- 2019 Prize of the International Hermann Hesse Society

== Selected works ==
In English

- 1991: Drewermann, Eugen; Laflamme, Joan Marie; Marz, Bernd (1991). Open heavens : meditations for Advent and Christmas. Maryknoll, N.Y.: Orbis Books. ISBN 0-88344-775-4. OCLC 24246573.
- 1993: Drewermann, Eugen (1993). Discovering the royal child within : a spiritual psychology of "The little prince". New York: Crossroad. ISBN 0-8245-1267-7. OCLC 27265888.
- 1994: Drewermann, Eugen (1994). Discovering the God child within : a spiritual psychology of the infancy of Jesus. New York: Crossroad. ISBN 0-8245-1388-6. OCLC 28634545.
- 1994: Drewermann, Eugen; Maloney, Linda M. (1994). Dying we live : meditations for Lent and Easter. Maryknoll, N.Y.: Orbis Books. ISBN 0-88344-855-6. OCLC 28963728.

In German

- 1977–1978: Drewermann, Eugen (1988). Strukturen des Bösen (in German). Paderborn: Schöningh. ISBN 3-506-76254-0. OCLC 75039872. (Habilitation)
- 1981: Grimm, Jacob; Grimm, Wilhelm; Drewermann, Eugen; Neuhaus, Ingritt (1982). Das Mädchen ohne Hände : Märchen Nr. 31 aus der Grimmschen Sammlung (in German). Olten: Walter. ISBN 3-530-16860-2. OCLC 215604245.
- 1981: Drewermann, Eugen (1990). Der tödliche Fortschritt : von der Zerstörung der Erde und des Menschen im Erbe des Christentums (in German). Regensburg: Pustet. ISBN 3-7917-0857-0. OCLC 22870817.
- 1982–1984: Drewermann, Eugen (1982). Psychoanalyse und Moraltheologie (in German). Mainz: Matthias-Grünewald. ISBN 3-7867-0989-0. OCLC 10878337.
- 1984: Drewermann, Eugen (2015). Das Eigentliche ist unsichtbar : Der Kleine Prinz tiefenpsychologisch gedeutet (in German). Freiburg. ISBN 978-3-451-33728-4. OCLC 898298531.
- 1984–1985: Drewermann, Eugen (1991). Tiefenpsychologie und Exegese (in German). Olten: Walter-Verlag. ISBN 3-530-16852-1. OCLC 25982052.
- 1987/88: Drewermann, Eugen (1987). Das Markusevangelium (in German). Olten: Walter-Verlag. ISBN 3-530-16871-8. OCLC 17951469.
- 1989: Drewermann, Eugen (2010). Kleriker Psychogramm eines Ideals (in German). Neu-Isenburg. ISBN 978-3-942472-03-6. OCLC 672402492.
- 1989: Drewermann, Eugen (1989). "Ich steige hinab in die Barke der Sonne" : Alt-ägyptische Meditationen zu Tod und Auferstehung in Bezug auf Joh 20-21 (in German). Olten: Walter-Verlag. ISBN 3-530-16901-3. OCLC 21303539.
- 1991: Drewermann, Eugen (1991). Die Spirale der Angst der Krieg und das Christentum; mit vier Reden gegen den Krieg am Golf (in German). Freiburg im Breisgau. ISBN 978-3-451-04003-0. OCLC 80006709.
- 1992: Drewermann, Eugen (1992). Giordano Bruno, oder, Der Spiegel des Unendlichen (in German). München: Kosel. ISBN 3-466-20363-5. OCLC 28190417. (novel)
- 1992: Drewermann, Eugen (2004). Wenn der Himmel die Erde berührt Meditationen zu den Gleichnissen Jesu (in German). Düsseldorf. ISBN 978-3-491-69407-1. OCLC 76677185.
- 1992: Drewermann, Eugen (1992). Die Botschaft der Frauen : das Wissen der Liebe (in German). Olten: Walter-Verlag. ISBN 3-530-16904-8. OCLC 28989906.
- 1992: Drewermann, Eugen; Grimm, Jacob; Grimm, Wilhelm (1992). Lieb Schwesterlein, lass mich herein : Grimms Märchen tiefenpsychologisch gedeutet (in German). München: Deutscher Taschenbuch Verlag. ISBN 3-423-35050-4. OCLC 28061707.
- 1992–1995: Matthäus Evangelist, Heiliger; Drewermann, Eugen (1993). Das Matthäusevangelium in der Übersetzung von Eugen Drewermann (in German). Solothurn. ISBN 978-3-530-55230-0. OCLC 75346441.
- 1993: Drewermann, Eugen (1993). Glauben in Freiheit : oder Tiefenpsychologie und Dogmatik (in German). Solothurn und Düsseldorf: Walter Verlag. ISBN 3-530-16896-3. OCLC 29790678.
- 1994: Drewermann, Eugen (1994). Eugen Drewermann : Was ich denke (in German). München: W. Goldmann. ISBN 3-442-12532-4. OCLC 33349285.
- 1996: Drewermann, Eugen (1997). Jesus von Nazareth : Befreiung zum Frieden (in German). Zürich: Walter. ISBN 3-530-16897-1. OCLC 611293508.
- 1998: Drewermann, Eugen (1998). Der sechste Tag : die Herkunft des Menschen und die Frage nach Gott (in German). Zürich: Walter. ISBN 3-530-16898-X. OCLC 614036597.
- 1998: Drewermann, Eugen (2012). Dass auch der Allerniedrigste mein Bruder sei Dostojewski - Dichter der Menschlichkeit; fünf Betrachtungen (in German). Ostfildern. ISBN 978-3-8436-0235-8. OCLC 813428998.
- 1999: Drewermann, Eugen (1999). Biologie und Theologie (in German). Zürich [etc.] ISBN 3-530-16899-8. OCLC 1270890272.
- 2001: Drewermann, Eugen; Hoeren, Jürgen (2001). Wozu Religion? : Sinnfindung in Zeiten der Gier nach Macht und Geld (in German). Freiburg: Herder. ISBN 3-451-27189-3. OCLC 49197396.
- 2002: Drewermann, Eugen (2002). Glauben in Freiheit (in German). Düsseldorf: Walter. ISBN 3-530-16900-5. OCLC 63744731.
- 2003: Drewermann, Eugen (2003). Religiös bedingte neurotische Erkrankungen (in German). Lengerich: Pabst Science Publishers. ISBN 3-89967-045-0. OCLC 53848068.
- 2003: Drewermann, Eugen (2003). Aschenputtel (in German). Düsseldorf. ISBN 978-3-530-17001-6. OCLC 76461090.
- 2003: Drewermann, Eugen (2003). Der Froschkönig : Grimms Märchen tiefenpsychologisch gedeutet (in German). Düsseldorf. ISBN 978-3-530-16953-9. OCLC 216906750.
- 2003: Schönborn, Felizitas von (2003). Eugen Drewermann, Rebell oder Prophet? : der unbequeme Theologe im Gespräch mit der Autorin (in German). Berlin: Edition q. ISBN 3-86124-561-2. OCLC 52134314.
- 2004: Drewermann, Eugen (2004). Hänsel und Gretel (in German). Zürich. ISBN 978-3-530-17007-8. OCLC 76581646.
- 2004: Drewermann, Eugen (2004). Moby Dick, oder, Vom Ungeheuren, ein Mensch zu sein : Melvilles Roman tiefenpsychologisch gedeutet (in German). Düsseldorf: Walter. ISBN 3-530-17010-0. OCLC 56533438.
- 2004: Drewermann, Eugen; Hoeren, Jürgen (2004). Wenn die Sterne Götter wären ... moderne Kosmologie und Glaube (in German). Freiburg im Breisgau. ISBN 978-3-451-28348-2. OCLC 249441494.
- 2005: Drewermann, Eugen (2005). Dornröschen (in German). Düsseldorf. ISBN 978-3-530-17011-5. OCLC 253781681.
- 2006: Drewermann, Eugen; Kunstmann, Joachim (2013). Heilende Religion Überwindung der Angst (in German). Freiburg, Br. ISBN 978-3-451-06555-2. OCLC 852487245.
- 2006: Drewermann, Eugen (2006). Atem des Lebens : Das Gehirn - Grundlagen und Erkenntnisse der Hirnforschung. Die moderne Neurologie und die Frage nach Gott Vol. 1 (in German). Düsseldorf: Patmos. ISBN 3-491-21000-3. OCLC 255352189.
- 2007: Drewermann, Eugen (2007). Atem des Lebens : Die Seele - zwischen Angst und Vertrauen. Die moderne Neurologie und die Frage nach Gott Vol. 2 (in German). Düsseldorf: Patmos. ISBN 978-3-491-21001-1. OCLC 255433624.
- 2023: Drewermann, Eugen (2023). Nur durch Frieden bewahren wir uns selber : Die Bergpredigt als Zeitenwende (in German). Düsseldorf: Patmos. ISBN 978-3-8436-1428-3. OCLC 1394346912.
