= Meinwerk =

11th-century Catholic bishop

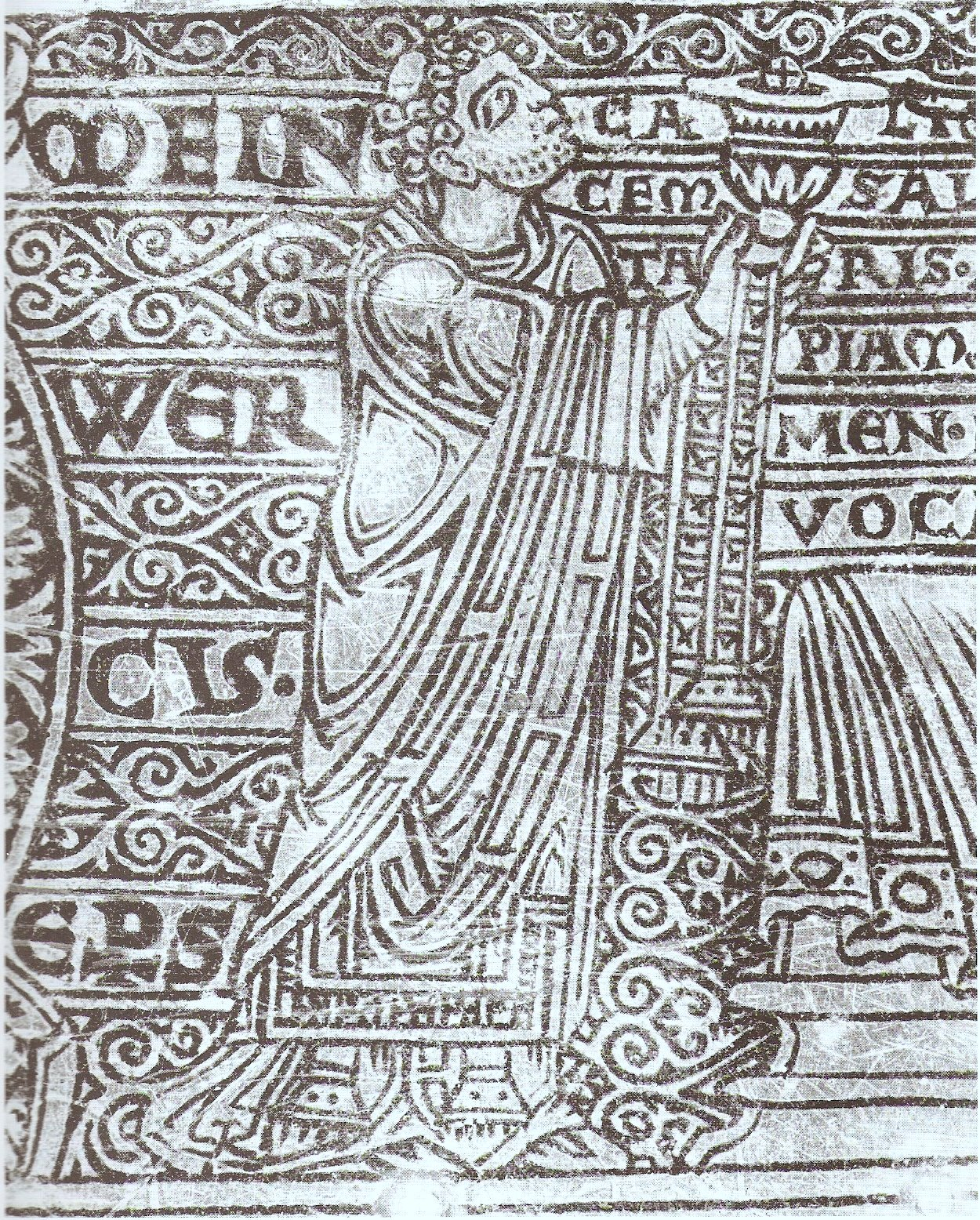
Meinwerk depicted on a 12th-century altar stone by Roger von Helmarshausen in the Diocesan Museum

Meinwerk (c. 975 – 5 June 1036) was the Bishop of Paderborn from 1009 until his death.

He was a member of the aristocratic Immedinger family and was granted his see on the understanding that his property would pass to the diocese on his death. He is known as "the Second Founder of Paderborn".

In 1014 and 1015, Meinwerk had two meetings with the Emperor Henry II to urge the continued reform of Corvey Abbey.

In 1017, he won a dispute with the Ekkehardinger over the rights to Helmarshausen Abbey. A gathering of nobles under the king declared in his favour, though the sources give differing reasons for this. The most likely explanation appears be that because Helmarshausen was too poor to provide the proper servitium regis to the king and because it lay within the diocese of Paderborn, which meant the bishop already had episcopal responsibility for it, it made sense to make a formal grant of it to the bishopric so that the bishop could more effectively protect it.

Meinwerk was highly suspicious of Haimerad, a well-known wandering hermit of unfree origins, and had him arrested and beaten, and his prayer-book burnt.

Meinwerk's competence in Latin is questionable. He was the butt of a practical joke by Emperor Henry II, who altered the words famulis et famulabis, meaning "male and female servants," to mulis et mulabis, "male and female mules," in a liturgical manuscript, which the bishop nevertheless read out loud without noticing anything amiss.

The Vita Meinwerci is a biography of him and his times.

Meinwerk took part in the German–Hungarian War in the summer of 1030.

His liturgical commemoration is listed for June 5.

== Sources ==
- Reuter, Timothy, 1991: Germany in the Early Middle Ages 800–1056. New York: Longman
- Bernhardt, John W., 1993: Itinerant Kingship and Royal Monasteries in Early Medieval Germany, c. 936–1075. Cambridge: Cambridge University Press
