= Drenther Crusade =

1228 Catholic military campaign against the inhabitants of Drenthe (modern Netherlands)

Date	1228–1232
Location	Drenthe province, Prince-Bishopric of Utrecht (modern-day Netherlands)
Result	Inconclusive. Coevorden fief ceded to Hendrik van Borculo, nunnery built in repentance by Drenthe

Belligerents
Bishopric of Utrecht; Frisian crusaders	Burgraviate of Coevorden ("Drenthe")

Commanders and leaders
Willibrand of Oldenburg	Frederik of Coevorden; Hendrik van Borculo

The Drenther Crusade (Dutch: Drentse Kruistocht, Fries-Drentse Oorlog) was a military campaign launched against the inhabitants of Drenthe with the approval of the Papacy in 1228 and lasting until 1232. It was led by Willibrand, Bishop of Utrecht, commanding an army composed mostly of Frisian crusaders.

The crusade was part of a longstanding conflict (Note: While the crusade itself is dated to 1228–1232, sources vary in the start and end dates they give to the wider conflict. Winter places the "uprising" in 1227–1231, while van Bavel puts the "revolt" in 1225–1240.) between the Drenthers (or Drents) and the bishopric of Utrecht over the prerogatives of the bishop and the religious practices of the Drenthers. The incident which turned the conflict into a crusade was the killing of Bishop Otto II of Utrecht in the Battle of Ane in 1227. Willibrand received papal authorization for a crusade on the grounds, it appears, that the Drenthers were heretics for defying their bishop. He preached the cross in Frisia between the summer of 1228 and the winter of 1230–31. There were several battles, but the crusade ended inconclusively in September 1232. The conflict simmered on into 1234.

There are two main sources for the conflict, both written around 1232–33 by contemporaries and eyewitnesses in the following of the bishop: the Deeds of the Bishops of Utrecht and A Certain Narrative of Groningen, Drenthe and Coevorden.

== Background ==
The Low Countries around 1350 Bishopric of Utrecht, including Drenthe

The County of Drenthe was a fief of the Holy Roman Empire belonging to the secular jurisdiction of the bishops of Utrecht. It also fell within the bishops' spiritual jurisdiction as part of the archdeaconries of Deventer and Oldenzaal. The inhabitants' dispute with the bishops primarily concerned the exercise of secular (not spiritual) authority. Bernard Slicher van Bath argued that the peasants, who were mostly freemen who owned their land and had their own organizations, feared that the bishops would reduce them to serfdom with the bishop as lord. F. H. J. Dieperink, on the other hand, has argued that they were mostly just opposed to compulsory payment of tithes and the governmental (not lordly) authority of the bishop.

The rebel party, however, was not composed solely of peasants. Emo of Friesland specifies that there were noble Drenthers among them and the Quaedam narracio says that "the whole of Drenthe" (tota Drenta) was in revolt. The women of Drenthe are said to have played an active role even in the fighting.

=== Drenthe–Groningen war ===
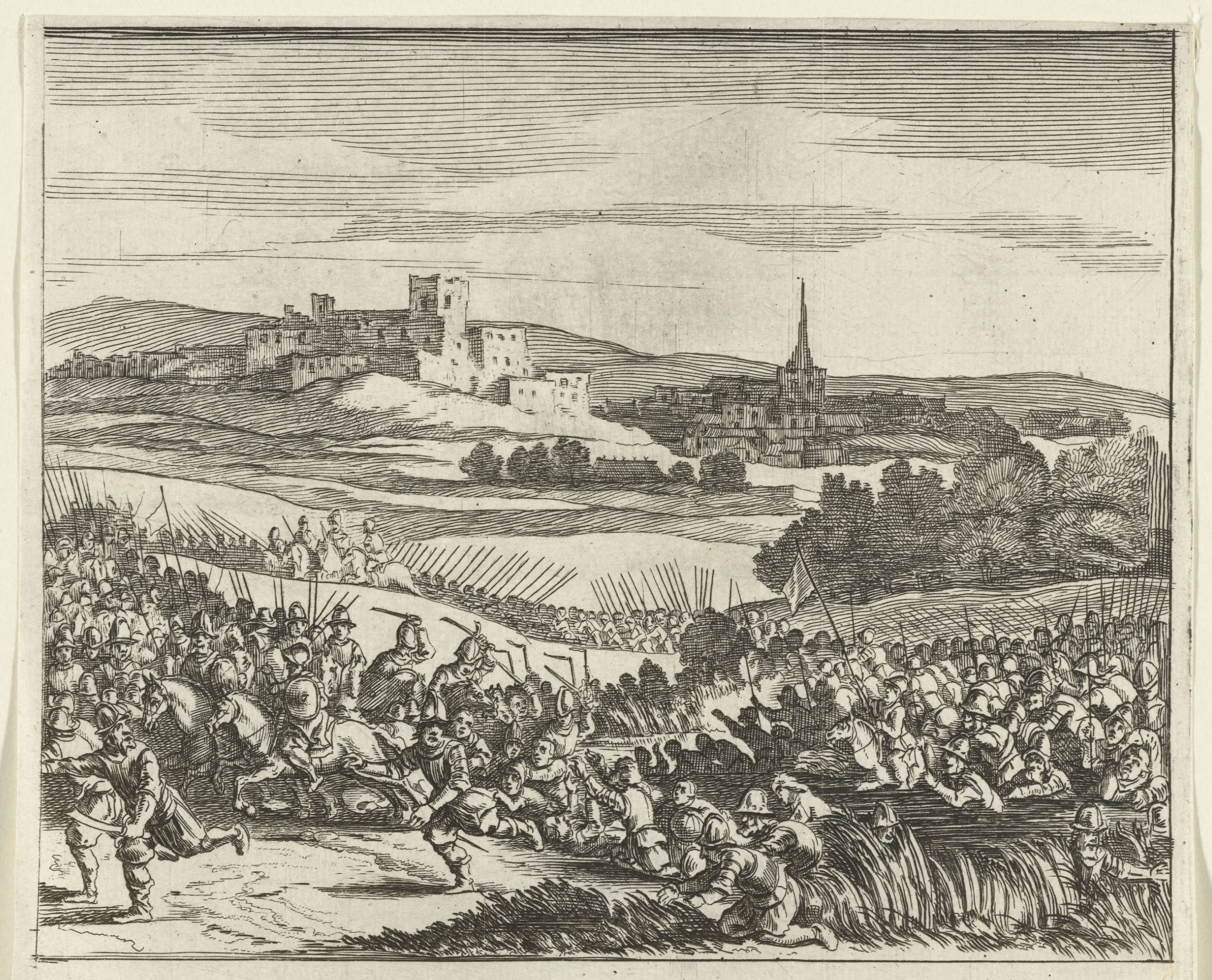
Battle of Ane (1227), which sparked the crusade

In late 1225 or early 1226, shortly after the assassination of Archbishop Engelbert II of Cologne, Count Rudolph of Coevorden with an army of Drenthers invaded Groningen, taking advantage of a dispute between the burgrave Egbert and his relatives, the wealthy Gelkingen. Egbert was an ally of Bishop Otto II and the Gelkingen were involved in trade, but the Deeds of the Bishops does not give a reason for their conflict. Rudolph took the side of the Gelkingen and there was, according to the Deeds, "civil war in Groningen" (civili guerre in Groninge).

Otto II ordered the two sides to cease fighting, travelled to Groningen and arranged a truce. When the truce was violated, Otto repeated his demands for peace and returned to Utrecht to raise an army. In his absence, Egbert built a line of defences at Glimmen, southeast of Groningen. Rudolph considered it a provocation, but Egbert defended his right to build whatever fortifications he wished within his own jurisdiction. The Drenthers nonetheless attacked Glimmen, razed the defences and took many prisoners, forcing Egbert to retreat into Frisia. There he recruited Frisian allies and marched on Groningen, which was occupied by Rudolph's forces. After serious fighting, Egbert retook the city and forced the occupiers to retreat to Drenthe.

Otto II gathered an army at Ommen southwest of Coevorden. As a veteran of the Fifth Crusade, Otto managed to attract a number of other veterans to his banner. His army also included knights sent by his brothers, Herman II of Lippe and Archbishop Gerard II of Bremen; by Archbishop Henry I of Cologne and Bishop Theoderic III of Münster; by Counts Floris IV of Holland, Gerard III of Guelders, Dietrich V of Cleves and Baldwin of Bentheim; and by Lord Gisilbert II of the Amstel. While the siege equipment and the food travelled by boat up the river Vechte, the army marched overland towards Coevorden.

On 28 July 1227, at a marshy site 6 miles (10 km) from Coevorden, the army of the bishop and the army of Rudolph met in the Battle of Ane. Otto II was killed together with many of his knights. The defeated army retreated to Utrecht. The author of the Deeds of the Bishops, recognizing that at Ane a new and more intense phase of the fighting had begun, wrote that "it was here that the war began" (bellum hinc inde incipitur).

=== Preparing a crusade ===
At the urging of the wounded count of Guelders and lord of the Amstel, Willibrand was elected to succeed Otto. He was related to the counts of Holland and Guelders and had served the Emperor Frederick II as an envoy to the Holy See. Moreover, like Otto II, he had experience crusading in the Latin East, having been on the Fourth Crusade.

Willibrand was at the imperial court in Italy at the time of his election and may have used the opportunity to obtain authorization from the pope for a crusade against the Drenthers. The papal bull declaring a crusade does not survive; but the Deeds of the Bishops indicates that Willibrand received papal authorization for a crusade indulgence. He preached and recruited crusaders in Frisia in the late summer and autumn of 1228, in the summer of 1230 and in the winter of 1230–31. The charge against the Drenthers was almost certainly that they were heretics for defying their bishop's authority (contemptus clavium, contempt for the keys of the kingdom).

Although the Deeds of the Bishops of Utrecht explicitly presents Willibrand's crusade as authorized by Pope Gregory IX, there is no other evidence of papal involvement and it is possible that the bishop acted on his own initiative.

Although King Henry (VII) of Germany declared the Drenthers outlaws after the battle of Ane, no royal or imperial aid was forthcoming to the bishops of Utrecht.

== Crusade ==
Willibrand was able to drive Rudolph and his brothers from Coevorden, but in 1229 their rights were restored and Rudolph went to war again. Willibrand's strength turned out to be superior, and the parties agreed upon a ceasefire. Rudolph of Coevorden was invited to come to Hardenberg for negotiations, but upon his arrival he was arrested and executed on 25 July 1230. His execution did not stop the war, but its intensity decreased thereafter.

When Rudolph's brothers continued the rebellion, Willibrand called on the Frisians and the townspeople of Groningen to support him in suppressing the rebellious Drenthers. Besides the Frisians, Willibrand also received support from the nobility of Twente and Salland. The anonymous chronicler of A Certain Narrative emphasized that the Frisians aided Willibrand of their own free will. So many volunteers showed up that the recruited army had to be split up into two parts.

The rural population of the Groningen province, however, decided to support the Drenthers. In 1230, the bishop's army was defeated near Bakkeveen, but was able to destroy a keep of the Drenthers at Mitspete. A settlement between the two parties was arranged in 1231, which meant that reparations had to be paid by Drenthe while Frederik of Coevorden was granted the Coevorden fief.

The peace was short-lived, though, because in the same year, the Drenthers and their allies besieged the episcopal forces at the restored Mitspete keep. This action resulted in great losses for the Drenthean army. However, an army from Groningen province was able to capture the Mitspete stronghold and the town of Zuidlaren. A Frisian warband was defeated at Bakkeveen. The Drenthean captain Hendrik van Borculo, who had recruited fresh troops in Westphalia, was able to repel another Frisian party that attacked the Drenthers at the Mitspete keep.

Willibrand's crusade ended inconclusively in September 1232.

== Aftermath ==
Willibrand died in 1233 and was succeeded by Otto III, who began immediately to gather a large army. This armament led to new negotiations, and peace was made between Drenthe and the bishopric. Hendrik van Borculo was granted the Coevorden fief. In turn, the Drenthers erected a Cistercian nunnery in repentance for the slaying of Otto II and his followers at Ane. When the conflict conclusively ended in 1240, the bishop's princely authority was intact but his manorial authority was weakened (soon to disappear completely) and the Drenthers were amnestied.

The Stedinger Crusade against the peasants of Stedingen, which Gregory authorized in 1232, may have been inspired by the Drenther Crusade.

== Bibliography ==
- Boffa, Sergio (2010). "Ane, Battle of". In Clifford J. Rogers (ed.). The Oxford Encyclopedia of Medieval Warfare and Military Technology. Vol. 3 vols. Oxford University Press. vol. 1, pp. 46–47.
- Dieperink, F. H. J. (1953). "De Drentse opstand tegen het bisschoppelijke gezag in 1227". Bijdragen van het Instituut voor Middeleeuwse Geschiednis der Rijks-Universiteit te Utrecht. 26: 1–36.
- Kennan, Elizabeth T. (1981). "Innocent III, Gregory IX and Political Crusades: A Study in the Disintegration of Papal Power". In Guy Fitch Lytle (ed.). Reform and Authority in the Medieval and Reformation Church. Washington, DC. pp. 15–35.
- Loud, Graham A. (2017). "A Political and Social Revolution: The Development of the Territorial Principalities in Germany". In Graham A. Loud; Jochen Schenk (eds.). The Origins of the German Principalities, 1100–1350: Essays by German Historians. Routledge. pp. 3–22.
- Köbler, Gerhard (2007). Historisches Lexikon der Deutschen Länder: die deutschen Territorien vom Mittelalter bis zur Gegenwart (7th rev. ed.). Munich: C. H. Beck.
- Maier, Christoph T. (1994). Preaching the Crusades: Mendicant Friars and the Cross in the Thirteenth Century. Cambridge University Press.
- Maier, Christoph T. (2006). "Drenthe Crusade (1228–1232)". In A. V. Murray (ed.). The Crusades: An Encyclopedia. Vol. 4 vols. ABC-CLIO. vol. 2, p. 365.
- Magnin, Jean Samuel (1851). Geschiedkundig schoolboek van Drenthe. Groningen: J. Oomkens J. Zoon.
- Rist, Rebecca (2011a). The Papacy and Crusading in Europe, 1198–1245. Bloomsbury Academic.
- Rist, Rebecca (2011b). "Pope Gregory IX and the Grant of Indulgence for Military Campaigns in Europe in the 1230s: A Study in Papal Rhetoric". Crusades. 10: 79–102. doi:10.1080/28327861.2011.12220449. S2CID 159433824.
- Slicher van Bath, Bernard H. (1946). "Drenthe's vrijheid". Bijdragen voor de geschiedenis der Nederlanden. 1: 161–196.
- van Bavel, Bas J. P. (2010). "Rural Revolts and Structural Change in the Low Countries, Thirteenth – Early Fourteenth Centuries". In Richard Goddard; John Langdon; Miriam Müller (eds.). Survival and Discord in Medieval Society: Essays in Honour of Christopher Dyer. Brepols. pp. 249–268.
- Winter, David Ross (2005). "The Life and Career of Master Wiger of Utrecht (fl. 1209–1237): An Early Convert to the Order of Friars Minor". Journal of Medieval History. 31 (1): 71–126. doi:10.1016/j.jmedhist.2004.12.003. S2CID 159602744.
