= Heilwig of Lippe =

13th-century German noblewoman

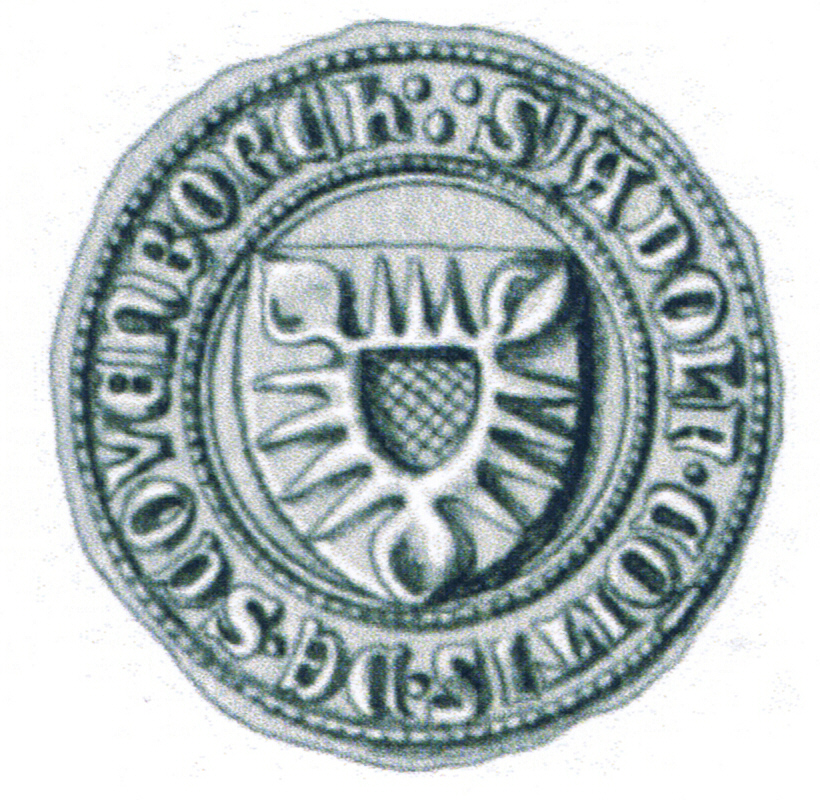
- Born: c. 1200
- Died: c. 1248/1250
- Noble family: Lippe
- Spouse: Adolf IV of Holstein
- Issue: Mechtild, Queen of Denmark; John I, Count of Holstein-Kiel; Gerhard I, Count of Holstein-Itzehoe
- Father: Herman II, Lord of Lippe
- Mother: Oda of Tecklenburg

Heilwig of Lippe, also known as Heilwig of Schaumburg (c. 1200 – c. 1248/1250) was a German noblewoman. She was countess of Holstein by marriage to Adolf IV of Holstein.

== Life ==
She was a daughter of Lord Herman II of Lippe and his wife, Oda of Tecklenburg.

On 14 February 1246, she founded the Cistercian monastery in Herwardeshude, a village at the mouth of the Pepermölenbek, between the later St. Pauli and Altona. The monastery was confirmed by Pope Innocent IV in 1247. This monastery later founded the monasteries In Valle Virgum, also in Herwardeshude, and in 1530, after the reformation, the Monastery of St. John, which still exists as a Protestant nunnery.

== Legacy ==
In 1870, the Heilwigstraße in Hamburg-Eppendorf was named after her.

== Marriage and issue ==
She was married to Count Adolf IV of Holstein-Kiel and Schauenburg. They had at least three children:

- John I
- Gerhard I
- Matilda

== Ancestors ==
Ancestors of Heilwig of Lippe

8. Herman I, Lord of Lippe
4. Bernard II, Lord of Lippe
2. Herman II, Lord of Lippe
10. Otto I, Count of Are-Hostaden
5. Heilwig of Are-Hostaden
1. Heilwig of Lippe
12. Henry I, Count of Tecklenburg
6. Simon I, Count of Tecklenburg
13. Eilika of Oldenburg
3. Oda of Tecklenburg
7. Oda of Berg-Altena
