= Crusades against Christians =

Religious wars focused against heretics

Crusades against Christians were Christian religious wars dating from the 11th century First Crusade when papal reformers began equating the universal church with the papacy. Later in the 12th century the focus of crusades century focus changed from non-christian pagans and infidels to heretics and schismatics. Holy wars were fought in northern France, against King Roger II of Sicily, various heretics, their protectors, mercenary bands and the first political crusade against Markward of Anweiler. Full crusading apparatus was deployed against Christians in the conflict with the Cathar heretics of southern France and their Christian protectors in the 13th century. This was given equivalence with the Eastern crusades and supported by developments such as the creation of the Papal States. The aims of this were to make the crusade indulgence available to the laity, the reconfiguration of Christian society, and ecclesiastical taxation.

== Crusades against Christians ==
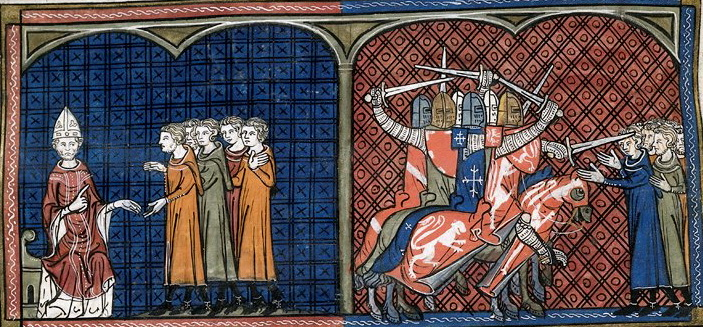
Miniatures showing Pope Innocent III excommunicating, and the crusaders massacring, Cathars(BL Royal 16 G VI, fol. 374v, 14th century)

Christian holy war had a long history pre-dating the 11th century when papal reformers began equating the universal church with the papacy. This resulted in the Peace and Truce of God movement supporting military defence of the church, clergy and its property. In 1053 Pope Leo IX attacked the Italo-Normans granting troops sin remission in return for a holy war. Later, Pope Gregory VII and his militia Sancti Petri considered fighting for the papacy as penitential; death brought salvation. This was less about an Augustinian just war than militant Christianity fighting in defence of the church from the 8th century. Late 11th century works of crusader theory by Anselm of Lucca and Bonizo of Sutri focused on heretics and schismatics rather than infidels. The First Crusade encouraged further holy wars, peacekeeping in northern France, papal fighting with King Roger II of Sicily in the 1120s and 1130s, and against various heretics, antipopes, their protectors, and mercenary bands in the 1130s and 1170s. Although there is little evidence of crusade preaching, Pope Innocent III is said to have waged the first "political" crusade from November 1199 for Sicily against Markward of Anweiler. Full crusading apparatus was first deployed against Christians in the conflict with the Cathar heretics of southern France and their Christian protectors in 1208. In 1215, the Fourth Lateran Council gave the Albigensian Crusade, between 1209 and 1229, equivalence with the Eastern crusades. This crusade was supported by developments such as the creation of the Papal States, the aim to make the crusade indulgence available to the laity, the reconfiguration of Christian society, and ecclesiastical taxation.

The Papacy's drive for homogenous Christianity encouraged crusades against any group with which there were differences such as:

- The Dutch peasants of Drenthe from 1228 to 1232;
- Bosnians Christians fighting the Hungarian kingdom from 1227;
- The German peasants of Stedingen from 1232 to 1234;
- Rebellious English barons in 1216, 1217 (see 1st Baron's War) and 1265 (see 2nd Baron's War);
- The Greek Orthodox Empire of Nicaea fighting against the Latin Empire to reclaim territory lost to the Fourth Crusade in 1231, 1239 and the 14th century until the Ottomans provided a greater threat.
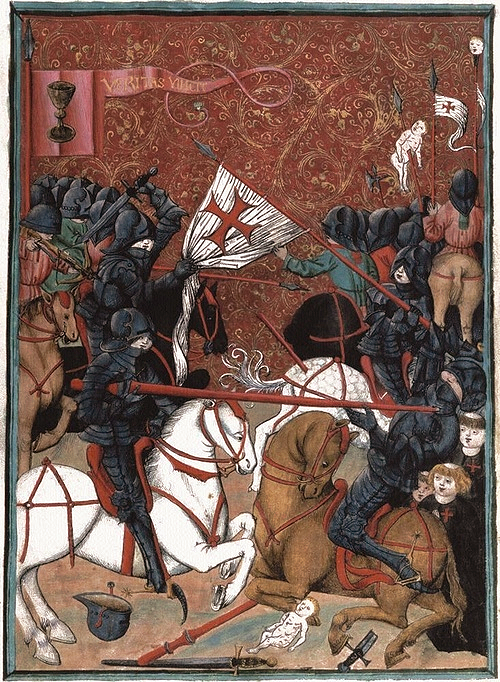
  Hussite victory over the Crusaders in the Battle of Domažlice, c. 1500, Jena Codex fol. 56r
  Various Popes used crusading for securing the papacy's political position:
- Crusade against the Hohenstaufen of the Holy Roman Empire and Sicily from 1239 to 1269 preventing encirclement by their German, Italian and Sicilian territories, reasserting papal feudal claims over Sicily and to defend the March of Ancona and the duchy of Spoleto. Church taxation funded John of Brienne's campaigns of 1228 to 1230, but it was in 1239 that Gregory IX first called a formal crusade when Frederick II threatened Rome after defeating the Lombard League. Following the emperor's death, crusading continued against his sons, the legitimate Conrad IV of Germany and the illegitimate Manfred, King of Sicily. Pope Clement IV recruited Charles I of Anjou, the younger brother of Louis IX of France, who in February 1266 defeated and killed Manfred at the Benevento, in August 1268 defeated Conradin, Conrad IV's son, at Tagliacozzo and ended the Staufen dynasty male line in October with Conradin's execution in October.
- Against Ezzelino III da Romano and his brother Alberic in 1255.
- Against Sardinia in 1263
- The Sicilian Vespers, the wars for Angevin control of Sicily from 1282 to 1302. In 1282 the Sicilians rebelled against Charles I of Anjou and Frederick's son-in-law, Peter III of Aragon, annexed the island. A 1283 crusade invading Aragon and a 1285 crusade invading the island by Philip III of France failed. Crusading against Aragonese rulers continued when Frederick III of Sicily refused to return the island to the Angevins. This ended in 1302 with the treaty of Caltabellota.
- Maintaining papal interests during the Avignon Papacy from 1309 to 1377.
- During the Western Schism between 1378 and 1417.
- Against Louis IV, Holy Roman Emperor reasserting imperial claims from 1310 to 1313.
- Pope Boniface VIII conflict with the Colonna family in 1297.
- The 1306 suppression of the heresies of Fra Dolcino in Piedmont.
- Against Venice over Ferrara in 1309–1310
- Crusades organised by cardinal-legates such as Bertrand du Pouget and Gil Albornoz against Milan and Ferrara in 1321; against Milan, Mantua, and rebels in Ancona in 1324; against Cesena and Faenza in 1354; against Milan again in 1360, 1363, and 1368; against mercenary companies such as that of Konrad von Landau In 1357, 1361 and 1369–1370.
- During the Western Schism between 1378 and 1417, Roman Pope Urban VI launched crusades against his Avignon rival Antipope Clement VII in 1378. Clement VII gave crusade privileges to competitors in the Neapolitan succession, as did Antipope John XXIII in 1411 and 1414.
- In 1383, Pope Urban VI gave Henry le Despenser's English campaign against Flanders the status of crusade as was John of Gaunt's attempt on the throne of Castile in 1386.

After 1417, the papacy became reluctant to use crusading for political ends, perhaps recognising the lack of adequate church funds to sponsor large armies, the futility, and the damage they caused to the standing of both papacy and crusade. Only Pope Julius II continued crusading in Italy. However, religious crusades continued against the Hussites of Bohemia in 1420, 1421, 1422, 1427, 1431 and between 1465 and 1471 with another planned between 1428 and 1429. The Protestant Reformation prompted a revival with several schemes, including against Henry VIII of England and later his daughter Elizabeth I of England.

== Bibliography ==
- Lock, Peter (2006). Routledge Companion to the Crusades. Routledge. ISBN 978-0-415-39312-6.
- Tyerman, Christopher (2006). "Crusades against Christians". In Murray, Alan V. (ed.). The Crusades: An Encyclopedia. Vol. I:A-C. ABC-CLIO. pp. 325–329. ISBN 978-1-57607-862-4.
