= Herman II of Lippe =

Herman II
- Lord of Lippe
- Born: 1175; Lippe (now called Lippstadt)
- Died: 25 December 1229
- Noble family: Lippe
- Spouse: Oda of Tecklenburg
- Issue Detail: Bernard III, Lord of Lippe; Heilwig of Lippe
- Father: Bernard II, Lord of Lippe
- Mother: Heilwig of Are-Hostaden

Herman II, Lord of Lippe (1175 – 25 December 1229) was a ruling Lord of Lippe.

== Life ==
Herman II was born in Lippe (now called Lippstadt), the eldest son of Lord Bernhard II and his wife, Heilwig, a daughter of Count Otto I Heilwig of Are-Hostaden.

He was co-regent with his father, and succeeded him in 1196 as ruler of the House of Lippe. He was less belligerent than his father and brother, and often tried to act as intermediary when his neighbours had a dispute. In the dispute over the German throne in 1198, Herman supported the Guelph side. He switched sides to support Emperor Frederick II in 1214.

In 1217 or 1218, Herman became administrator in Utrecht, representing his brother Otto II, who was Bishop of Utrecht. He promoted the cities and gained the post of Vogt of the Monasteries Clarholz and Herzebrock. His main opponent during this period was Engelbert II of Berg, who was Archbishop of Cologne. Earlier in his career, Herman had supported Engelbert.

In 1227, Herman II fought in the Battle of Bornhöved against Denmark. He supported his brother, Archbishop Gerhard II of Bremen against the farmers in Stedingen and fell in battle against them. This brought about a strong reaction from Gerhard, resulting in the Stedinger Crusade.

== Marriage and issue ==
Herman was married to Oda, a daughter of Count Simon I of Tecklenburg and Countess Oda of Berg-Altena. Among their seven children were:

- Bernard III (c. 1194 – c. 1265), Lord of Lippe
- Simon I (c. 1196 – 6 June 1277), Bishop of Paderborn
- Otto II (c. 1198 – 21 June 1259), Bishop of Münster
- Heilwig (c. 1200 – c. 1248/1250), married to Count Adolph IV of Holstein-Kiel
- Ethelind (c. 1204 – 17 September 1262), married Count Conrad I of Rietberg
- Gertrude (c. 1212 – 30 September 1244), married Count Louis of Ravensburg-Biesterfeld

Herman II of Lippe House of Lippe Born: 1175 Died: 25 April 1229
Preceded by Bernard II	Lord of Lippe; 1196–1229	Succeeded by Bernard III
Preceded by Bernard II	Lord of Rheda	Succeeded by Bernard III
