= Battle of Ane =

Battle in 1227 in Germany

Coordinates: 52.614°N 6.651°E

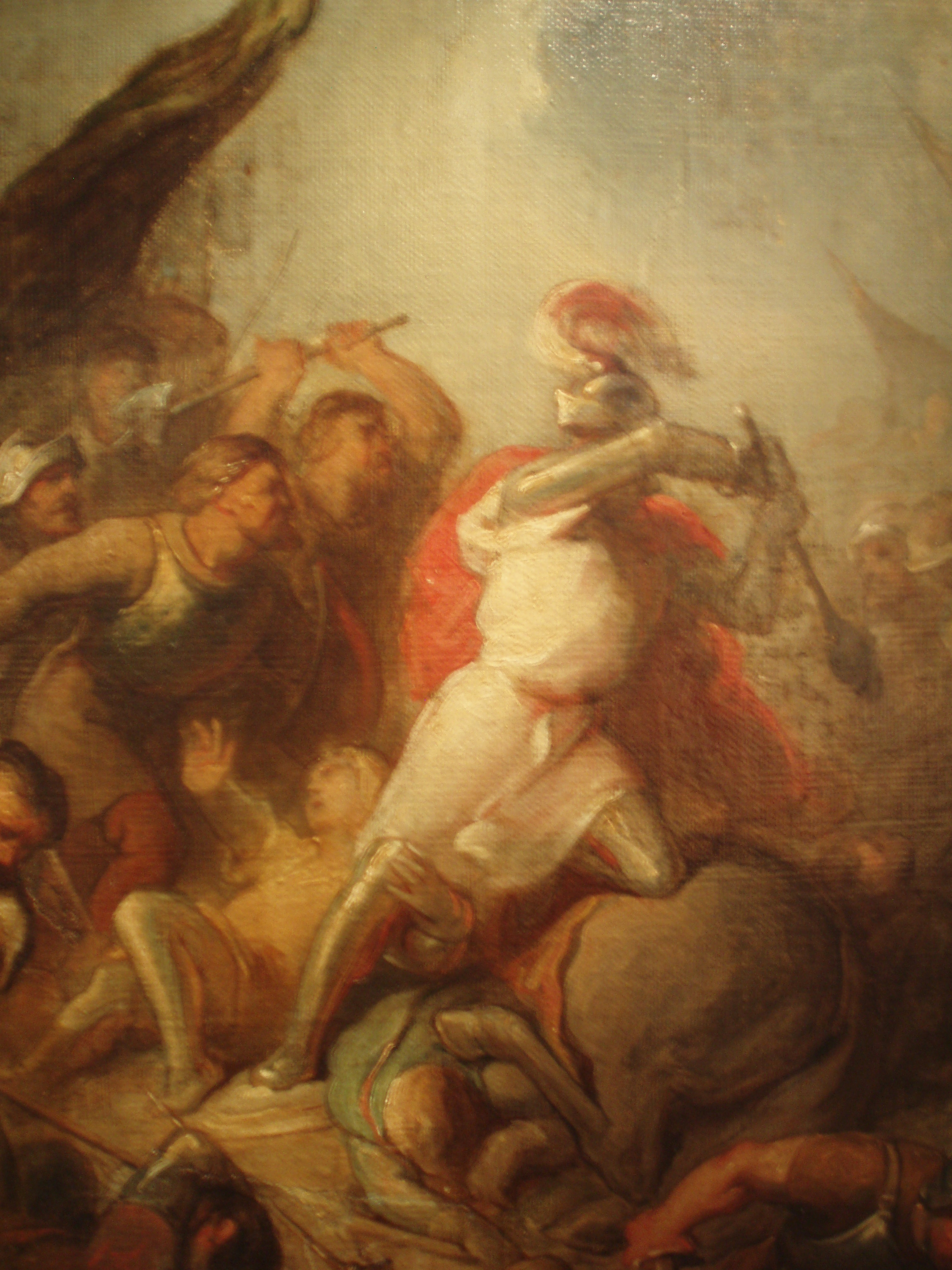
- Otto II of Lippe goes down fighting in the battle of Ane (Antonie Frederik Zürcher, 1825-1876)
Date	28 July 1227
Location	Ane, (Overijssel, Netherlands)
Result	Victory for Drenthe: Death of Otto II of Lippe

Belligerents
Bishopric of Utrecht	Drenthe

Commanders and leaders
Otto II of Lippe †	Rudolph van Coevorden

Casualties and losses
Over 400 deaths	Unknown

The Battle of Ane (Dutch Low Saxon:Slag bi'j Aone, Dutch:Slag bij Ane), was fought in 1227 between Otto II of Lippe, Bishop of Utrecht, and Rudolf II van Coevorden with his army of Drenths. The account of the battle comes from Quedam narracio de Groninghe de Trentis de Covordia et diversis aliis sub episcopis traiectensibus ("A narrative of Groningen and Drenthe and various other things under the Bishops of Utrecht"), a manuscript from the early 13th century.

== Background ==
From the middle of the 11th century the Bishops of Utrecht were given the lands of Groningen, Overijssel and Drenthe as a fief by the Holy Roman Emperor. In 1141 Hartbert van Bierum, the Bishop of Utrecht gave Groningen and Drenthe as fiefdoms to the brothers Leffard and Ludolf, his vassals. Rivalry amongst the respective heirs, prefect Egbert of Groningen and burgrave Rudolf II of Coevorden led to conflicts between Drenthe and Groningen in which the Drenths fought both with and against the troops of the bishop. This came to a head in the Battle of Ane.

== Battle ==
On 28 July 1227 the armies of the Bishop of Utrecht Otto II of Lippe and a large group of rebellious Drenths led by Rudolph van Coevorden met on a field near the present-day village of Ane.

The Bishop had traveled to the valley of the Overijsselse Vecht to call the rebellious province of Drenthe to order and teach the local peasants a lesson. He was accompanied by many nobles, famous knights and troops supplied by the Bishops of Munster and Cologne. The bishop and his troops met in Ommen and travelled via Hardenberg (then Nienstede) and Gramsbergen to "that disastrous and cursed place" Ane. Rudolf positioned his troops, mainly peasants, behind the Mommeriete, a quagmire approximately half a mile wide, without bushes or trees, with vegetation covering the treacherous peat. As soon as the heavily armoured knights charged, they sank into the quagmire and were easy prey for the lightly armed, but mobile troops of Rudolf, accustomed to the local terrain.

The Drenths managed to beat the Bishop's forces, and killed most of it including the Bishop Otto II of Lippe, and many of his supporting knights. Otto’s successor, Wilbrand van Oldenburg, roused the Frisian people into supporting him against the rebellious Drenths which led to the Friso-Drentic War in 1231-1233 that was initially won by the Drenths. In 1233, Wilbrand's successor Otto III van Holland succeeded in suppressing the rebellion by mustering a large army.

As a penance the Drenths had to build and maintain a monastery, Sancta Maria de Campe (Mariënkamp) near Coevorden. The location proved to be unsuitable and the monastery was moved to a place near Rolde around 1258. The monastery later grew out to become the city of Assen, the present day capital of the province of Drenthe.

In 1967 a monument was erected near Ane to commemorate this battle. It has an inscription in Zuud-Drèents: "Slag bi'j Aone, 28 juli 1227, zie vocht'n ok veur oenze vri'jheid." ("Battle of Ane, 28 july 1227, they also fought for our freedom".)

== Noble casualties ==
- Gerard III, Count of Guelders (wounded)
- Lord Gijselbert of Amstel
- Otto II of Lippe, Bishop of Utrecht
- Diderick van der Lippe, Bishop of Münster
- Gerhard II of Lippe, Bishop of Bremen (wounded)
- The lord of Arkel, and his cousin
- Bernhard van Horstmar, Crusader knight
- Gerhart, Count of Goor
- Dietrich V, Count of Cleves (wounded)
- Baldwin, Count of Bentheim
- Engelbert, Lord of Groningen
- Lambertus van Nettelhorst, Knight (died)
