= Bernard II of Lippe =

Founder of the Lordship of Lippe and the towns of Lippstadt and Lemgo

Bernard II
- Lord of Lippe
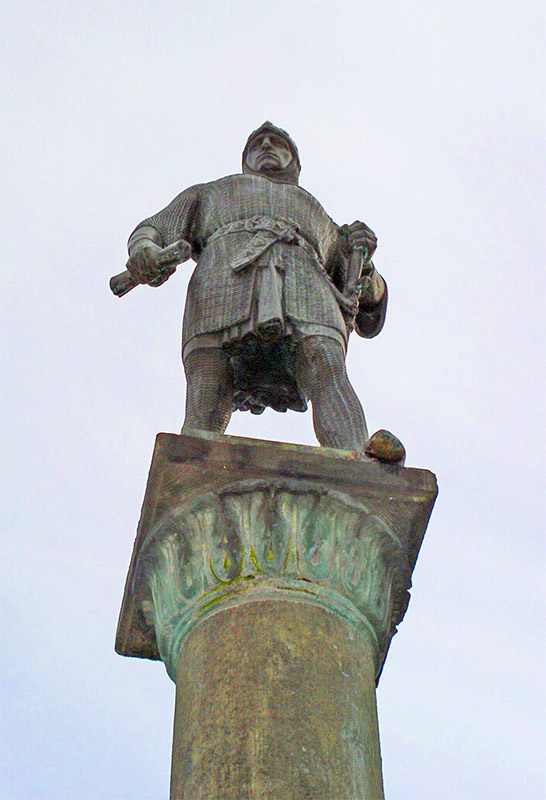
- Statue of Bernard II, Lord of Lippe in Lippstadt.
- Full name: German: Bernhard II. Herr zur Lippe
- Born: c. 1140
- Died: 30 April 1224 (aged 83–84); Mežotne
- Noble family: Lippe
- Spouse: Heilwig of Are-Hochstaden
- Issue Detail: Herman II, Lord of Lippe; Otto II of Lippe; Gerhard II (archbishop of Bremen and Hamburg)
- Father: Herman I, Lord of Lippe

Bernard II (German: Bernhard II. Herr zur Lippe; c. 1140 – 30 April 1224) was Lord of Lippe from 1167 until 1196. He founded the towns of Lippstadt and Lemgo.

== Marriage and children ==
In 1167, Bernard married Heilwig (1150–1196), likely the daughter of Otto, Count of Are-Hochstaden. They had eleven children who survived into adulthood.

Five sons:

- Herman II (1175 – 25 Apr 1229)
- Otto II († 28 Jul 1227); Bishop of Utrecht from 1215
- Bernard IV († 14 Apr 1247); Bishop of Paderborn from 1228
- Dietrich († 28 Jul 1227); killed at the Battle of Ane
- Gerhard II (c. 1190 – 28 August 1258); Archbishop of Bremen from 1219

Six daughters:

- Ethelind, Abess of Bassum from c. 1224 to c. 1243
- Gertrud II, Abbess of the Imperial Abbey at Herford from 1217 to 1239
- Kunigunde, Abbess of Freckenhorst from 1219 to c. 1225
- Adelheid, married Heinrich I of Arnsberg, as a widow she became the Abbess of Elten
- Heilwig (c. 1186 – after 1244), married Gottfried II. of Ziegenhain
- Beatrix († 1244), married Heidenrich I. of Lutterberg

Margarethe of Lippe († 1221) is frequently listed as a daughter of Bernard II and an unknown mother. This remains unproven.

Bernard II of Lippe House of Lippe Born: c. 1140 Died: 30 April 1224
| Preceded by Herman I | Lord of Lippe; 1168–1196 | Succeeded by Herman II |
