= Herman I =

Herman I may refer to:

- Herman I (Archbishop of Cologne) (died in 924)
- Herman I, Duke of Swabia (died in 949)
- Herman I, Count Palatine of Lotharingia (died in 996)
- Herman I, Margrave of Meissen (died in 1038)
- Herman I, Margrave of Baden (c. 1040 – 1074)
- Herman I, Count of Winzenburg (c. 1083 – 1137 or 1138)
- Herman I, Lord of Lippe (ruled 1158–1167)
- Hermann I, Landgrave of Thuringia (died in 1217)
- Herman I, Count of Henneberg (1224–1290)
- Hermann I, Count of Celje (1433-1485)
