= Quaedam narracio =

Quaedam narracio de Groninghe, de Thrente, de Covordia et de diversis aliis sub diversis episcopis Traiectensibus ("A Certain Narrative of Groningen, Drenthe, Coevorden and of Various Other Issues under Various Bishops of Utrecht"), usually just Quaedam narracio for short, is an anonymous Latin prose chronicle written in 1232–33 by a Frisian clergyman attached to Bishop Willibrand of Utrecht. It was written during the Drenther uprising of 1227–1232.

The Quaedam narracio is found in the Liber donationum (Book of Donations) of Utrecht Cathedral (now Utrecht, Gemeentearchief, Archief van het Domkapittel, inv. 52A). This manuscript contains a record of donations made to the cathedral and also another short historical narrative, the Bella Campestria. The Quaedam narracio is divided into forty short chapters (headings) covering the bishops of Utrecht from Hartbert (r. 1139–1150) down to the reigning bishop, Willibrand. It is chiefly concerned with the bishops' efforts to assert and extend their authority in the regions of Coevorden, Drenthe and Groningen and with their conflicts with the counties of Holland and Guelders.

== Editions ==
- C. Pijnacker Hordijk, ed. Quedam narracio de Groninghe, de Thrente, de Covordia et de diversis aliis sub diversis episcopis Traiectensibus. Utrecht: Kemink & Zoon, 1888.
- A. M. Braaksma et al., eds. Quedam Narracio de Groninghe, de Thrente, de Covordia et de diversis aliis sub diversis episcopis traiectensibus. Amsterdam, 1977.
- Hans van Rij, ed. Een verhaal over Groningen, Drente, Coevorden en allerlei andere zaken onder verschillende Utrechtse bisschoppen. Hilversum: Verloren, 1989.
