= Rudolph van Coevorden =

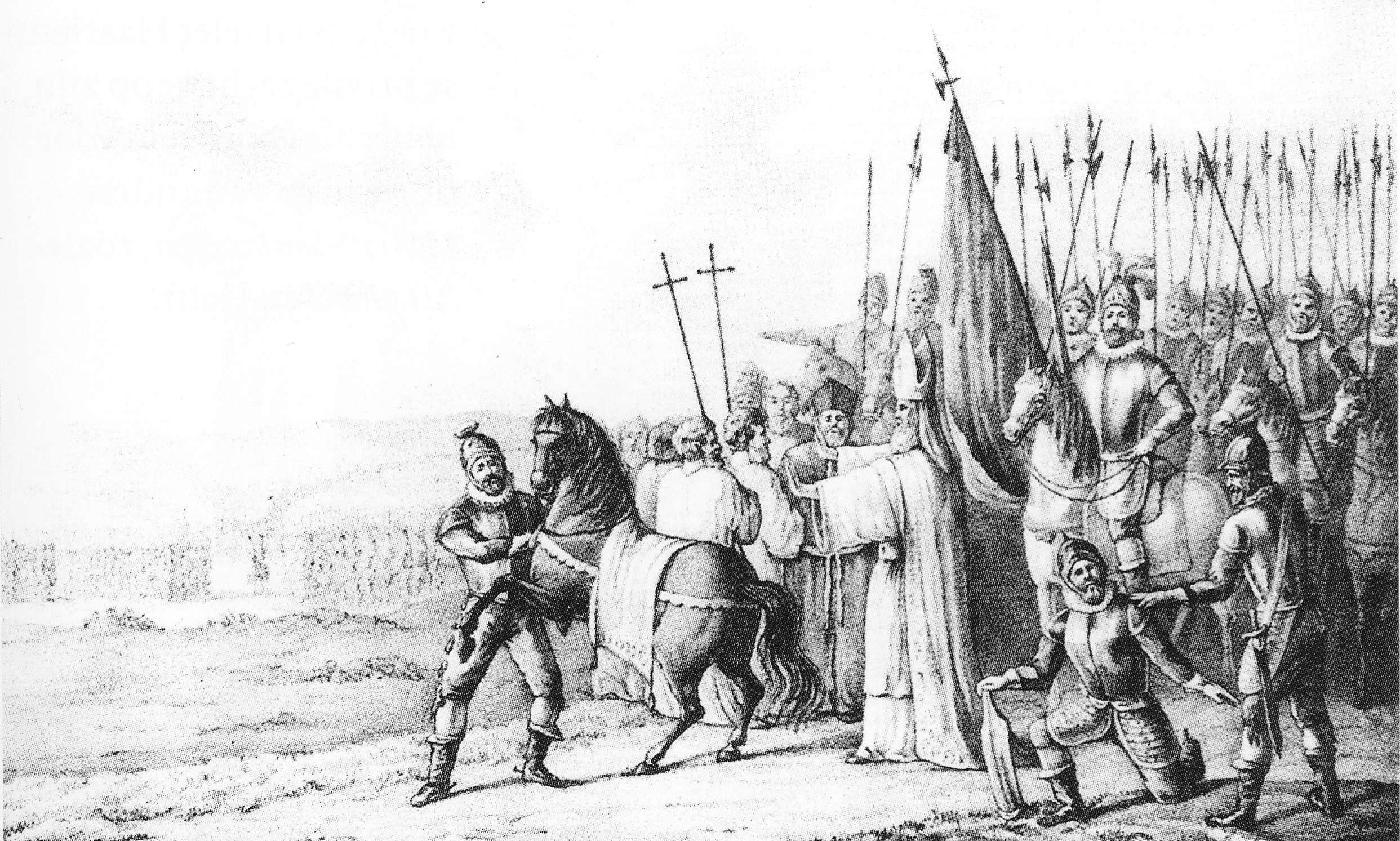
Otto II of Lippe curses Rudolf of Coevorden.

Rudolph van Coevorden (died 25 July 1230) was a feudal lord of the Drenthe who led a rebellion against Otto II, Bishop of Utrecht. He defeated and killed Otto at the Battle of Ane in 1228. Otto's successor, Wilbrand, initiated a crusade against the Drenthers. During a truce in 1230, Rudolph was arrested at a meeting in Hardenberg and executed.
