= Henry I of Tecklenburg =

German nobleman (c. 1115–1156)

Henry I, Count of Tecklenburg
- Born: c. 1115
- Died: 22 November 1156
- Noble family: House of Tecklenburg
- Spouse: Eilika of Oldenburg
- Issue: Simon I, Count of Tecklenburg
- Father: Egbert I, Count of Tecklenburg
- Mother: Adelaide of Zutphen

Henry I, Count of Tecklenburg (c. 1115 – 22 November 1156) was a German nobleman. He was the ruling Count of Tecklenburg from c. 1150 until his death.

== Life ==
Henry I was born around 1115 as the eldest son of Egbert I and his second wife, Adelaide of Zutphen. He married Eilika (b. c. 1120), a daughter of Count Elimar II of Oldenburg.

He succeeded his father as Count of Tecklenburg around 1150, and was a vassal of the Bishops of both Münster and Osnabrück. His having two liege lords led to many disputes. He owned many small properties, all over Westphalia and Frisia, and consistently expanded his power base. In 1154 and 1155, he spent some time in Italy with Emperor Frederick I Barbarossa.

He died on 22 November 1156.

== Issue ==
- Simon I (c. 1140 – 8 August 1202), married Oda of Berg-Altena (c. 1145 – 1224), who was Count of Tecklenburg from 1156 to 1202
