= Simon I of Tecklenburg =

Simon I, Count of Tecklenburg
- Born: c. 1140
- Died: 8 August 1202
- Noble family: House of Tecklenburg
- Spouse: Oda of Berg-Altena
- Issue Detail: Adolf of Osnabrück
- Father: Henry I, Count of Tecklenburg
- Mother: Eilike of Oldenburg

Simon I, Count of Tecklenburg (c. 1140 – 8 August 1202) was Count of Tecklenburg from 1156 until his death.

== Life ==
Simon was the son of Count Henry I of Tecklenburg and his wife, Eilike (Heilwig) of Oldenburg (1126 – after 1189). In 1156, he succeeded his father as Count of Tecklenburg, including Ibbenbüren. In his time, he was a famous war hero.

In 1173, he resigned from the important post of bailiff of Münster. He was a loyal supporter of the Hohenstaufen and in 1174, he accompanied Emperor Barbarossa to Italy. As a captain in the army of Cologne, he fought in Saxony, Holstein, Italy and in Palestine during the Third Crusade. His military career was considered the high point of the history of the House of Tecklenburg. He opposed Duke Henry the Lion of Saxony and Bavaria, because of his bold power grab, and faithfully supported his liege lord, Archbishop Philip I of Cologne.

During the Battle of Halerfeld on 1 August 1179, he was captured and had to submit to Henry the Lion. In 1182, he became bailiff of Osnabrück. He founded Essen (Oldenburg) and became its bailiff and also became bailiff of Metelen and Malgarten. For a while, he had to pledge Tecklenburg to Cologne. In 1196, he became Arch-Cupbearer of Mainz. Around this time, he fought some devastating feuds against the Bishops of Münster and Osnabrück and the Count of Ravensburg. He had to cede Iburg to Osnabrück.

He laid the foundation for a good administration of Tecklenburg. The first notarii appeared during his reign. He opposed Emperor Henry VI's proposal to make the imperial crown hereditary. He supported the election of Emperor Otto IV in 1198 and became Otto's chancellor in 1201. A major feud broke out against the Counts of Ravensburg, who supported the Hohenstaufen in the struggle for the imperial crown. Simon won this feud, and with it the fiefs Ravenburg had held from the Archbishops of Bremen and Cologne and from the Bishop of Paderborn.

== Marriage and issue ==
Simon I was married to Oda (c. 1145 – 1224), the daughter of Count Eberhard I of Berg-Altena and Adelaide of Arnsberg. Simon and Oda had the following children:

- Heilwig (c. 1178 – after 1180)
- Oda (c. 1180 – 5 April 1221), married Lord Herman II of Lippe
- John (c. 1181 – c. 1198)
- Otto I (c. 1185 – 11 September 1263), Count of Tecklenburg
- Henry II (c. 1186 – 1226), co-ruler from 1202 until his death
- Adolf (c. 1187 – 30 June 1224), Bishop of Osnabrück from 1216 until his death

== See also ==
- Tecklenburg, the town
- Tecklenburg Castle
