= Wilbrand of Oldenburg =

Dutch bishop (died 1233)

- Bishop of Utrecht
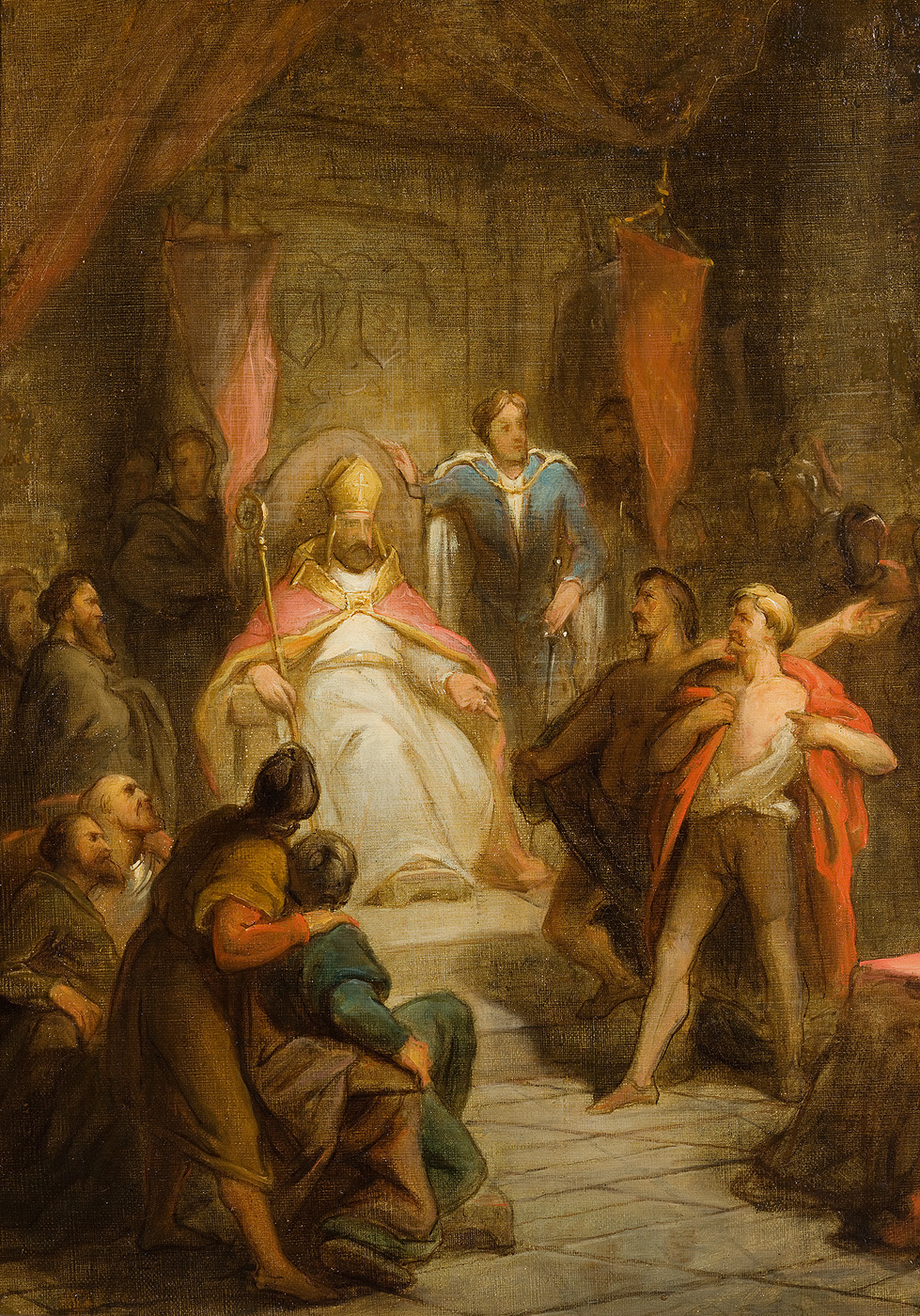
- Wilbrand of Olderburg is visited by the lords of Guelders and Amstel after their release after the Battle of Ane
- Church: Catholic Church
- Diocese: Archdiocese of Utrecht
- In office: 1227–1233

Personal details
- Born: Before 1180
- Died: 26 July 1233

Wilbrand of Oldenburg (before 1180 - Zwolle, 26 July 1233) was a bishop of Paderborn and of Utrecht.

== Family ==
Wilbrand was the son of Henry II, Count of Oldenburg-Wildeshausen, and Beatrix of Hallermund, daughter of Wilbrand I, Count of Loccum-Hallermund. His uncle Gerhard of Oldenburg was bishop of Osnabrück from 1192 to 1216 and archbishop of Bremen from 1216 to 1219. Wilbrand was also related to the count of Holland and Guelders.

Wilbrand's older brothers Burchard of Wildenbrug and Henry III, Count of Oldenburg were killed in a crusade against the Stedingers. His other brother Engelmar was provost at Munster.

== Life ==
From 1211 to 1212 Wilbrand was Canon of Hildesheim, where he was ordered by Otto IV, Holy Roman Emperor to prepare the Fifth Crusade to the Holy Land. He travelled throughout the region and reported about this in his Itinerary of the Holy Land (Latin: Itinerarium Terrae Sanctae), an important historical source on the crusades and crusader castles. He was supported in this task by the grandmaster of the Teutonic Knights, Hermann von Salza. Afterwards Wilbrand was made provost in Hildesheim and of the St. Nicholas church in Magdeburg. The next years Wilbrand spent a lot of time in Italy as envoy of Frederick II, Holy Roman Emperor.

In 1225 Wilbrand was consecrated as bishop of Paderborn, where he successfully pacified the rebellious nobility. In 1226 he was temporarily given governance of the bishoprics of Münster and Osnabrück, after their bishops had been deposed as a result of their complicity in the murder of Engelbert II of Berg, Archbishop of Cologne.

In 1227 Wilbrand was moved by pope Gregory IX to the Bishopric of Utrecht because of his military experience, in order to replace bishop Otto van Lippe, who had died at the Battle of Ane. After a failed attempt to gain control of Coevorden with support from the Frisians in the Frisian-Drenths War, Wilbrand defeated the Drenths at Peize. Wilbrand invited the Drenth commander Rudolph II van Coevorden to castle Hardenberg for negotiations. But upon Rudolph's arrival he was taken prisoner, and subsequently executed by means of the breaking wheel. Afterwards his body was impaled on a stake and shown to the crowd.

Wilbrand had built the castle of Hardenberg himself to replace the vulnerable town of Nijenstede to serve as protection against the Drenths. In 1230 the bishop gave city rights to Zwolle as a reward for their support in strengthening the castle.

Wilbrand was interred in the St. Servaas-abbey in Utrecht.

Preceded by Otto II of Lippe	Bishop of Utrecht; 1227–1233	Succeeded by Otto III van Holland
