= Otto II of Lippe =

Dutch bishop (died 1227)

Otto II
- Bishop of Utrecht
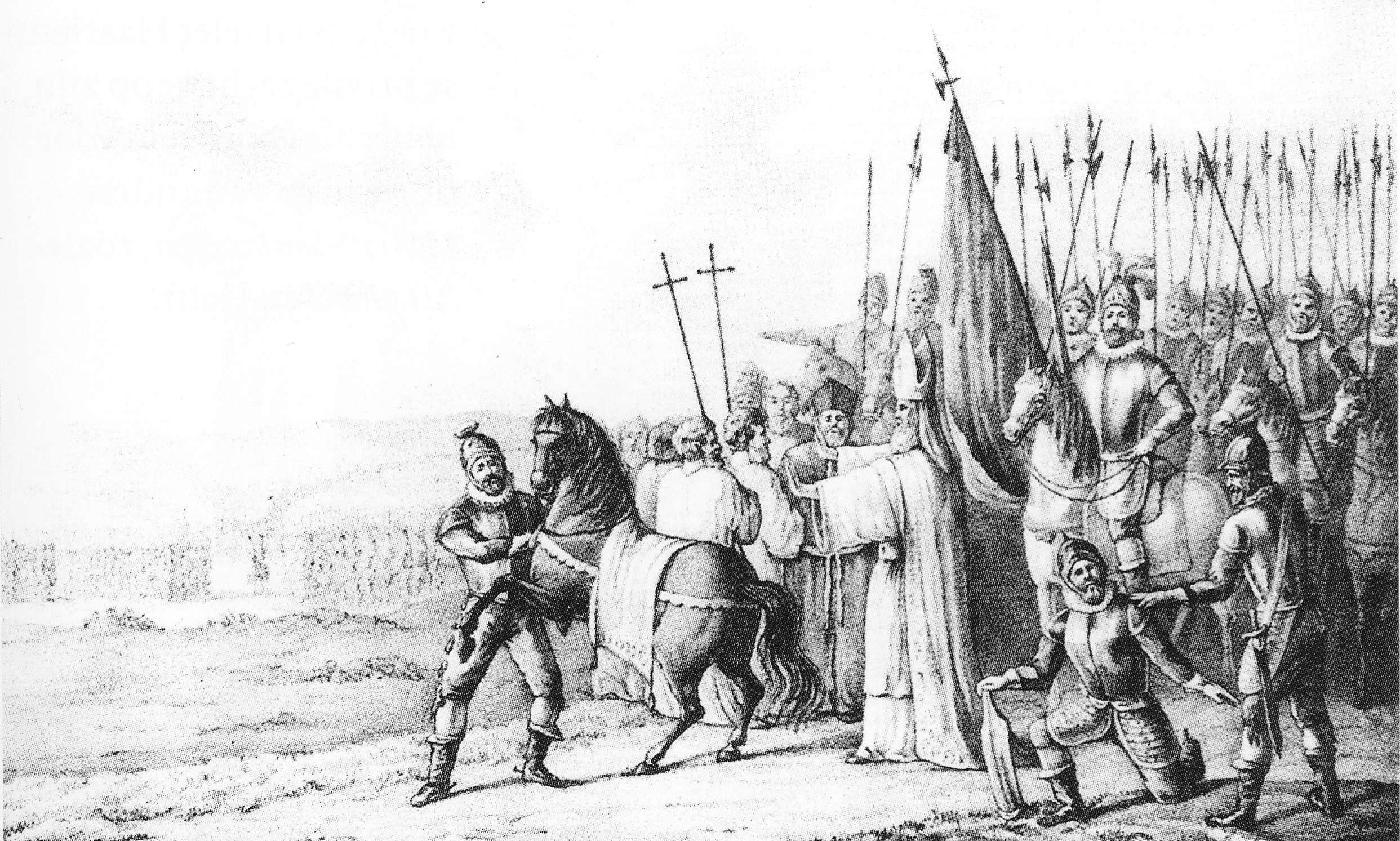
- Otto II of Lippe curses Rudolf of Coevorden.
- Church: Catholic Church
- Diocese: Archdiocese of Utrecht
- In office: 1216–1227

Personal details
- Died: 28 July 1227

Otto of Lippe was a son of Bernhard II, Lord of Lippe. He was bishop of Utrecht as Otto II from 1216 to 1227. Several of his brothers also held high ecclesiastical offices in the Rhineland. He likely participated in the foundation of the Teutonic Order.

During the Fifth Crusade, Otto visited Palestine.

In 1227, Otto was joined by his former enemy, count Floris IV, Count of Holland, to suppress a rebellion by the people of Drenthe, led by Rudolph van Coevorden. He died in the Battle of Ane (a town close to Hardenberg) on 28 July 1227.

Preceded by Otto I	Bishop of Utrecht; 1216–1227	Succeeded by Wilbrand van Oldenburg
