= Herman I of Lippe =

Herman I was Lord of Lippe from 1158 through 1167.
