= Gerhard II (archbishop of Bremen and Hamburg) =

Roman Catholic archbishop

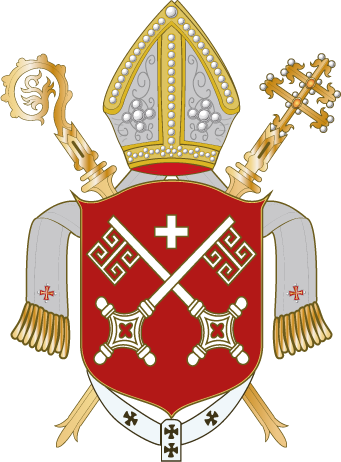
Coats of arms of the archbishopric of Bremen

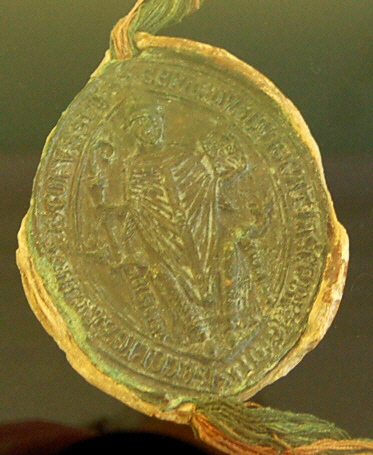
Gerhard II's seal of 1240

Gerhard II of Lippe was an archbishop of Bremen & Hamburg. He was born at about 1190 as a son to Bernard II of the House of Lippe that ruled the lordship of Lippe in Westphalia. He was prince archbishop of Bremen and Hamburg from 1219 to his death on 28 August 1258.

He fought some quarrels against the citizens of Bremen who gained for more autonomy of their city, with successes and defeats on both sides.

He organized the crusade against the rural citizens of Stedingen. Under his rule, the first bridge across the Weser in Bremen was built, as an enterprise of the counts of Neubruchhausen. And he made a great relaunch of Bremen Cathedral, he began to build the couple of huge western towers and he displaced the flat ceilings of the naves by vaults. These works were started in pure romanesque style and finished in gothic style.

== See also ==
- List of administrators, archbishops, bishops, and prince-archbishops of Bremen

== Sources ==
- Wilhelm von Bippen: Gerhard II., Erzbischof von Bremen. In: Allgemeine Deutsche Biographie (ADB). vol. 8, Duncker & Humblot, Leipzig 1878, S. 734–736.
- Friedrich Prüser: Gerhard II., Edelherr zur Lippe. In: Neue Deutsche Biographie (NDB). vol. 6, Duncker & Humblot, Berlin 1964, ISBN 3-428-00187-7, S. 263 (digitized reprint).
