= Stedingen =

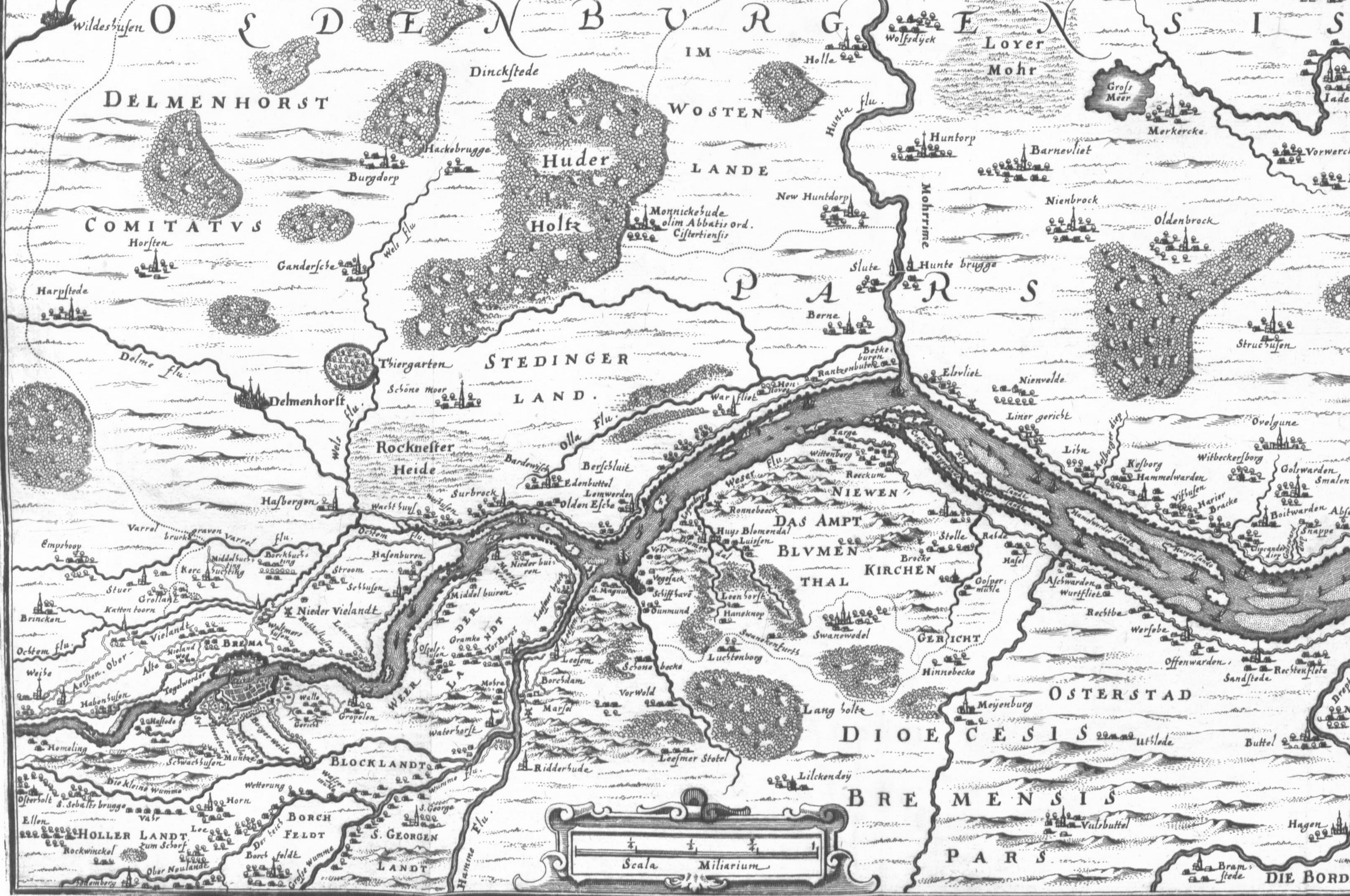
Map showing the Stedinger Land

Stedingen is an area north of Bremen in the delta of the Weser river in north-western Germany.

== Founding ==
In 1106, five Dutchmen journeyed from the mouth of the Rhine to Bremen to negotiate an arrangement with Archbishop Frederick I of Bremen to settle the swampy regions south of the Hunte on both sides of the Weser River, an area which came to be called Stedingen. The peasants were to cultivate the land, which would pass from father to son in free hereditary possession, while every settler would pay a yearly tax of one pfennig, the eleventh sheaf of all harvests, and a tenth of all livestock as acknowledgement of the archbishop's overlordship; otherwise, they would be free to administer their own affairs without interference by any secular lord. The arrangement found great favor among the younger Dutch peasants, who went to settle the area in large numbers, despite the difficulty of cultivating the marshy moorland, where the soil was poor and Heath, cotton grass and reeds covered the land and the riverbank. The settlers dug ditches to drain much of the water and built dikes to provide dry land and to prevent flooding.

== Gerard I ==
During the reign of Gerard I (German: Gerhard) as archbishop (1210–1219), his kinsman Otto I, Count of Oldenburg, was given permission to build two fortresses, Lechtenburg and Lineburg, in Stedingen, in order to enforce both ecclesiastical and feudal discipline on the peasantry, who clung to old-style Germanic folk-customs and continually sought greater independence from the overlordship of Bremen. "The Stedingers refused to pay tithes and to perform forced labour as serfs, sticking to the original agreement of settlement. These duties were demanded of them with considerable severity...". The Stedingers accused the Count's vassals of rape and kidnapping, and determined at their Thing or popular assembly to proclaim total independence, to refuse to pay their feudal tithes, to build bulwarks with fortified gates and trenches along the roads, and to form militias in order to defend against any encroachment. Gerard, busied with other concerns, did little to counter these acts of defiance.

== Gerard II and the crusade ==
The new archbishop, Gerard II, was determined to enforce orthodoxy on the Stedingers, as well as payment of the tax which his predecessor had neglected to collect. When a mendicant friar who was traveling through the territory proclaimed in a sermon that "Disobedience was idolatry," he was attacked by the inhabitants, who then embarked on a spate of anti-clerical violence, sacking monasteries and killing clergy. The Archbishop, resolved on enforcing his demands, built Schlutterburg Castle on the border of the Stedinger territory, in which he installed his brother, Lord Herman II of Lippe. On Christmas of 1229 came the first battle between the peasantry and the knights of the Archbishop; Herman was killed, and the rest of the knights took in flight.

On the 17th of March 1230, Gerard convened a council at Bremen, where the abbots and higher clergy of the archbishopric were to try the Stedingers for their refusal to obey feudal law, for rioting, sacrilege, and murder, and for allegedly worshipping images of wax, seeking counsel from soothsayers, and consorting with evil spirits. Having found the peasants guilty, the council decreed an interdict and the excommunication of all those who opposed the archbishop's decrees; the church doors were nailed shut and the priests left the territory.

The archbishop himself went to Rome to persuade Pope Gregory IX to call for a crusade against the Stedingers. He succeeded in this and Dominican friars were dispatched throughout northern Germany to preach the crusade, for which the pope promised the same spiritual rewards as for the crusades in the Holy Land. In spring of 1233, a large number of German noblemen, supported by the citizenry, assembled for the campaign in Bremen.

The population on the east bank of the Weser had not prepared adequate defenses, so the crusading army attacked there first, massacring most of the population; the few survivors were burnt at the stake. The crusaders then returned to Bremen to prepare the attack against the more heavily fortified west bank of the Weser. They made their assault on the West Stedingers on the 6th of July, 1233, but were repelled with heavy losses. In the winter of that year, Gerhard attempted to drown the rebels by having holes bored into the levees of the Weser to weaken them, but the workers were driven off by the levees' guards.

In spring of the year 1234, the Dominicans throughout northern Germany preached a new crusade against the Stedingers. A large army was assembled at Bremen under the command of Henry I, Duke of Brabant, while Stedingers were led by Bolko von Bardenfleth, Tammo von Huntrop, and Detmar tom Diek.

The Stedingers under Bolko von Bardenfleth advanced against the crusaders at one of the territory's fortified gates; neither side could gain a decisive advantage until a single crusading knight forced his armored war horse all the way to the rear of the peasant troop, thus opening a path for the other crusaders. The peasants were then quickly overwhelmed.

The rest of the Stedingers had taken a position by Altenesch under Detmar tom Diek and Tammo von Huntrop, where they too were defeated after heavy resistance. As it was recorded in the Saxon Chronicle of Reppichau: "Thus the Stedingers met their end; because they had carried on for more than thirty-three years with great violence and injustice, our Lord God struck them down with His own violence."

== Modern ==
There are many people named Steding living today throughout northern Germany. In the Hameln region (on the south of the river Weser) there are Steding families, a Steding Shoe Store in Hessisch-Oldendorf, and a Steding Metzgerei (Butcher / Deli) in the old town of Hameln. The Steding families have moved throughout Germany. There are also Steding families living in the United States, most originally from this same region south of the river Weser (Hessisch-Oldendorf, Fuhlen).

== Literature ==
- Klaus Dede: Stedingen Ein Land, das nicht sein durfte. Fischerhude (1976).
- Gustav Schöne (Ed.): Die Repgauische Chronik. Das Buch der Könige, (1859).

== Sources and references ==
- (not yet integrated)
- Die Stedinger Information [German language only]
- Further Stedinger Information [German language only]
- Link to Region - 10km away from Hameln (the Pied Piper) where there are many Steding families living

== See also ==
- Eala Frya Fresena
