= Buda Castle =

Castle complex in Budapest, Hungary

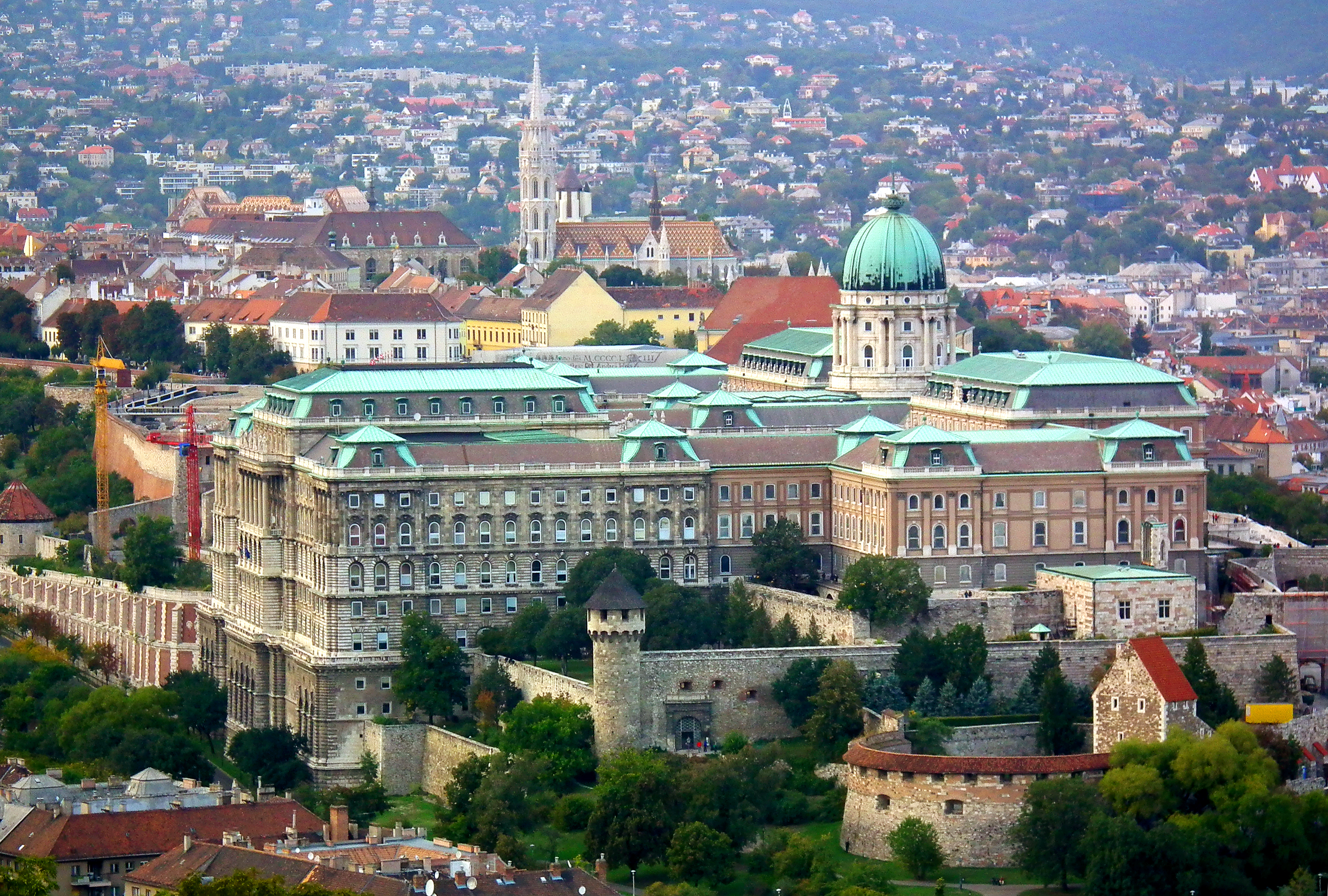
- Buda Castle in 2013 with Matthias Church in the background

- Location within Budapest Location within Hungary
- 47°29′46″N 19°02′23″E
- Location: Budapest, Hungary

History
- Built: 14th–20th century

Site notes
- Area: 4.73 km^{2} (1.8 sq mi)
- Architect(s): Jean Nicolas Jadot, Nicolò Pacassi, Miklós Ybl, Alajos Hauszmann
- Architectural styles: Medieval, Baroque, Baroque Revival, Art Nouveau

UNESCO World Heritage Site
- Official name: Budapest, including the Banks of the Danube, the Buda Castle Quarter and Andrássy Avenue
- Type: Cultural
- Criteria: ii, iv
- Designated: 1987 (11th session)
- Reference no.: 400-001
- Region: Hungary

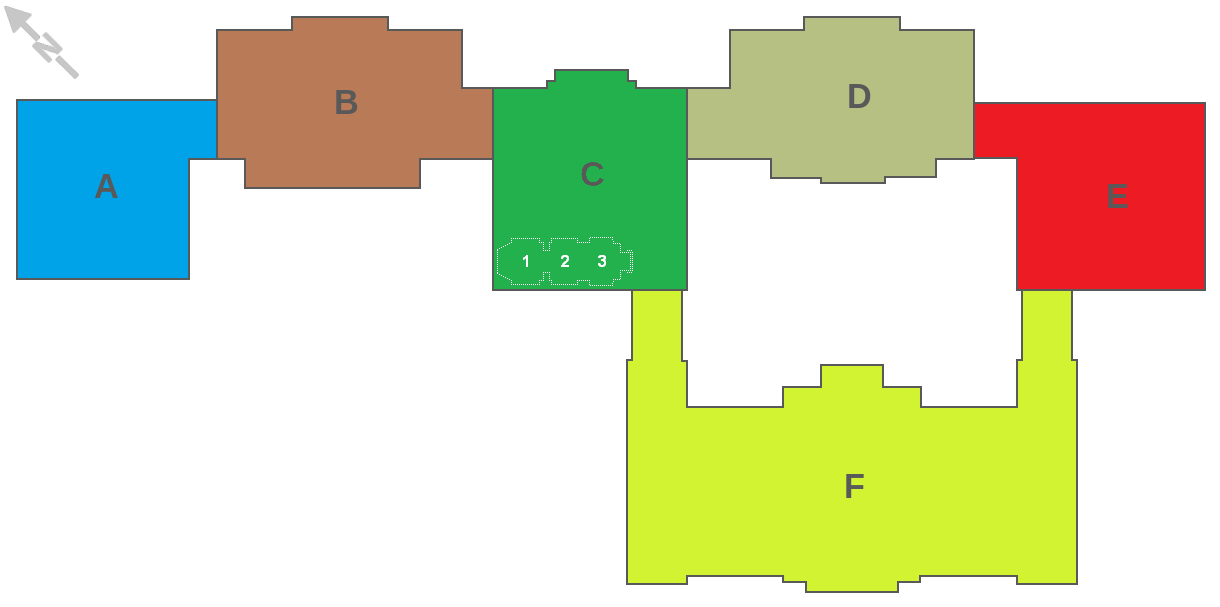
Plan of Buda Castle: buildings A, B, C, D – Hungarian National Gallery, building E – Budapest Historical Museum, building F – National Széchényi Library. Underneath building C is the Palatinal Crypt with 3 rooms.

Buda Castle (Hungarian: Budavári Palota, German: Budaer Burg), formerly also called the Royal Palace (Hungarian: Királyi-palota) and the Royal Castle (Hungarian: Királyi Vár, German: Königliche Burg), is the historical castle and palace complex of the Hungarian kings in Budapest. First completed in 1265, the Baroque palace that occupies most of the site today was built between 1749 and 1769, severely damaged during the Siege of Budapest in World War II, and rebuilt in a simplified Baroque style during the state communist era. Presently, it houses the Hungarian National Gallery, the Budapest Historical Museum, and the National Széchényi Library.

The palace complex sits on the southern tip of Castle Hill (Hungarian: Várhegy). Its defensive walls extend to surround the entire Castle Quarter (Várnegyed) neighborhood to its north, which is well known for its medieval, Baroque, and neoclassical houses, churches, and other monuments. Several prominent government buildings, including Sándor Palace and the Carmelite Monastery of Buda, are located in the Castle Quarter. Locally, this neighborhood and the palace are collectively called a Vár (lit. 'the Castle').

Castle Hill is linked to Clark Ádám Square and the Széchenyi Chain Bridge by the Castle Hill Funicular. The Castle Quarter falls within the part of Budapest that UNESCO declared a World Heritage Site in 1987.

== History ==
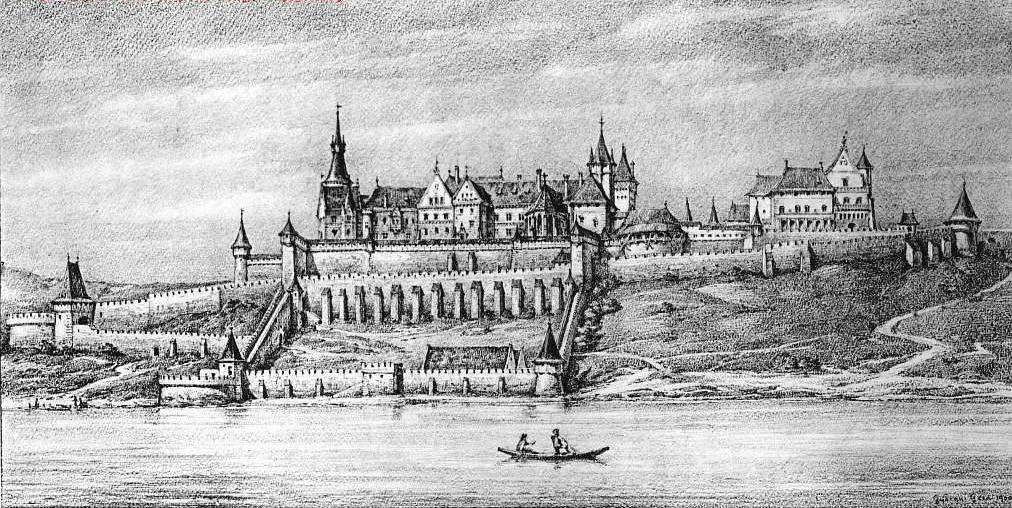
Eastern view of the Medieval Royal palace (1490s)

=== Middle Ages ===
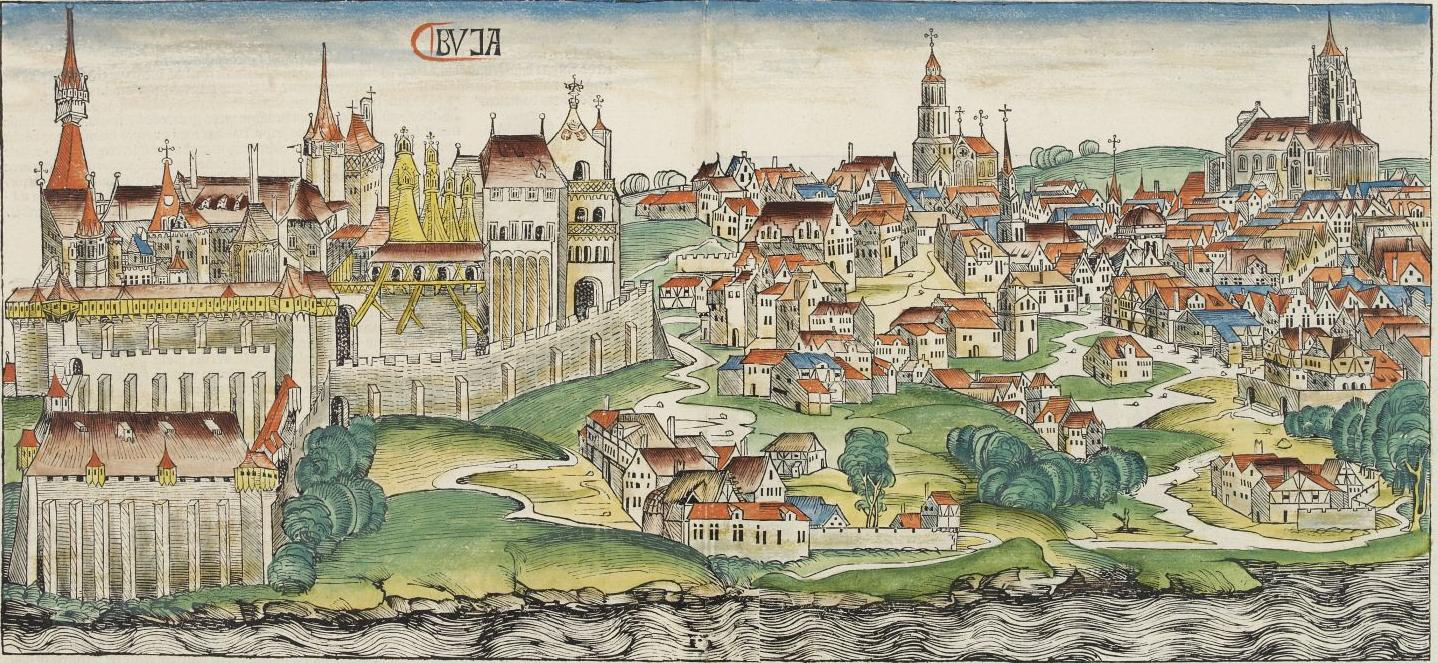
Buda Castle in the Nuremberg Chronicle, 1493

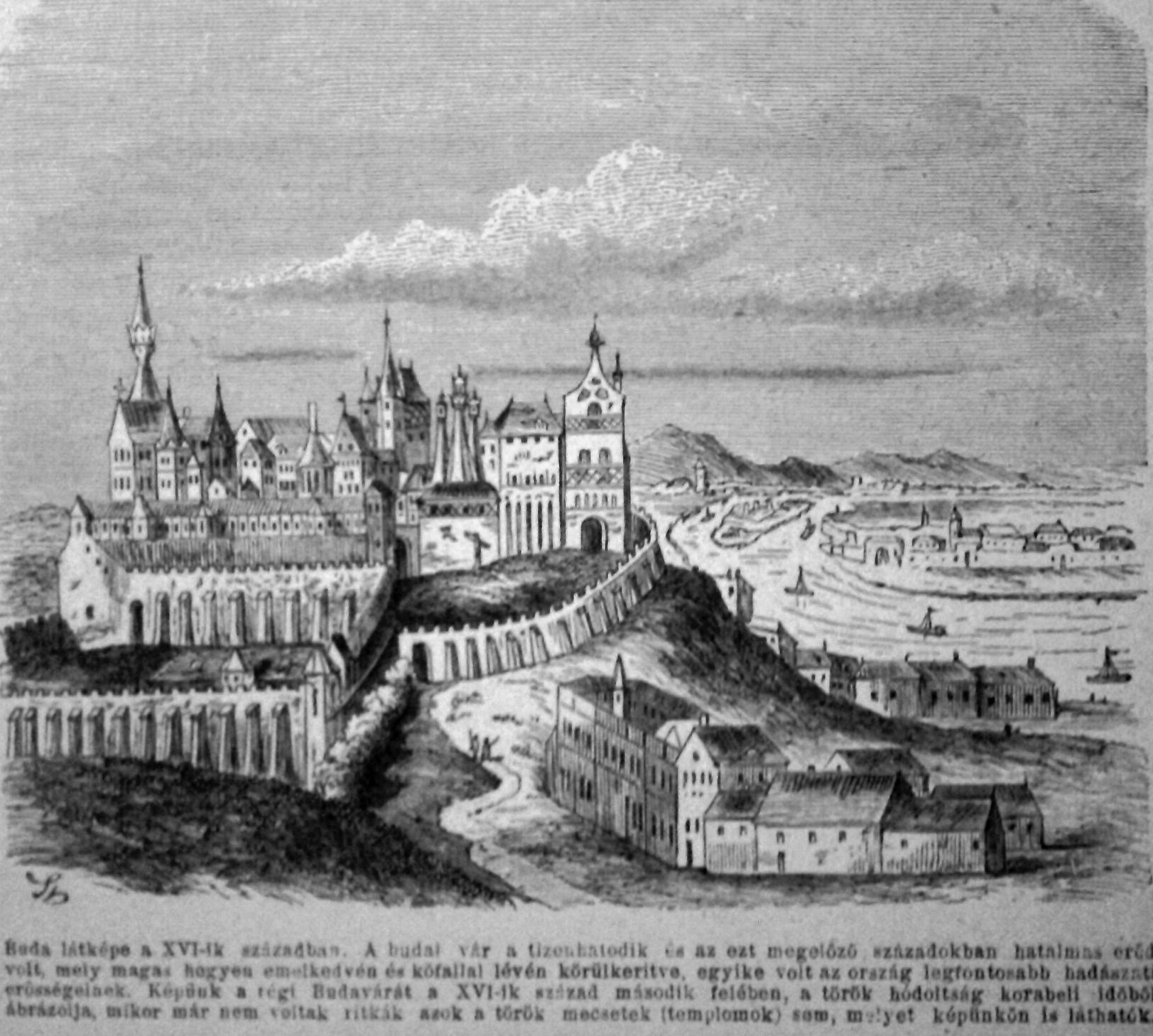
Southern view of the Medieval Royal palace (1520s)

The first royal residence on the Castle Hill was built by King Béla IV of Hungary between 1247 and 1265. It is uncertain whether it was situated on the southern tip of the hill or on the northern elevation, near the Kammerhof.

The oldest part of the present-day palace was built in the 14th century by Stephen, Duke of Slavonia, who was the younger brother of King Louis I of Hungary. Only the foundations remain of the castle keep, which was known as Stephen's Tower (Budapest)' (Hungarian: István-torony). The Gothic palace of King Louis I was arranged around a narrow courtyard next to the keep.

King Sigismund significantly enlarged the palace and strengthened its fortifications. Sigismund, as a Holy Roman Emperor, needed a magnificent royal residence to express his prominence among the rulers of Europe. He chose Buda Castle as his main residence, and during his long reign it became probably the largest Gothic palace of the late Middle Ages. Buda was an important artistic centre of the International Gothic style.

Construction began in the 1410s and was largely finished in the 1420s, although some minor works continued until the death of the king in 1437. The palace was first mentioned in 1437, under the name "fricz palotha".

The most important part of Sigismund's palace was the northern wing, known as the Fresh Palace (Hun: Friss-palota). On the top floor was a large hall called the Roman Hall (70 × 20 m or 230 × 66 ft) with a carved wooden ceiling. Great windows and balconies faced toward the city of Buda. The façade of the palace was decorated with statues, a and coat-of-arms. In front stood the bronze equestrian statue of Sigismund, later repaired by King Matthias Corvinus.

The southern part of the royal residency was surrounded with narrow zwingers. Two parallel walls, the so-called "cortina walls", run down from the palace to the River Danube across the steep hillside. The most imposing structure, the Broken Tower (Hun: Csonka-torony), on the western side of the cour d'honneur, remained unfinished. The basement of the tower was used as a dungeon; the top floors were probably the treasury of the royal jewels.

The last phase of large-scale building activity took place under King Matthias Corvinus. During the first decades of his reign the king finished the work on the Gothic palace. The Royal Chapel, with the surviving Lower Church, was likely built at that time.

After the marriage of Matthias and Beatrice of Naples in 1476, Italian humanists, artists and craftsmen arrived at Buda. The Hungarian capital became the first centre of Renaissance north of the Alps. The king rebuilt the palace in an early Renaissance style. The cour d'honneur was modernised and an Italian loggia was added. Inside the palace were two rooms with golden ceilings: the Bibliotheca Corviniana and a passage with the frescoes of the twelve signs of the Zodiac. The façade of the palace was decorated with statues of John Hunyadi, László Hunyadi and King Matthias. In the middle of the court there was a fountain with a statue of Pallas Athene.

Only fragments remain of this Renaissance palace: some red marble balustrades, lintels and decorative glazed tiles from stoves and floors.

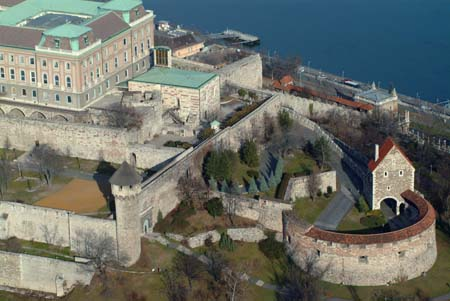
The reconstructed medieval fortifications and the Great Rondella

In the last years of his reign Matthias Corvinus started construction of a new Renaissance palace on the eastern side of the Sigismund Courtyard, next to the Fresh Palace. The Matthias Palace remained unfinished because of the king's early death. The palace had a monumental red marble stairway in front of the façade. Matthias Corvinus was usually identified with Hercules by the humanists of his court; the bronze gates were decorated with panels depicting the deeds of Hercules, and a great bronze statue of the Greek hero welcomed the guests in the forecourt of the palace complex, where jousts were held.

The walled gardens of the palace were laid out on the western slopes of the Castle Hill. In the middle of the enclosure, a Renaissance villa was built by Matthias. Only one column survives of this so-called Aula Marmorea.

After the death of Matthias Corvinus, his successor, King Vladislaus II, carried on the works of the Matthias Palace, especially after his marriage with Anna of Foix-Candale in 1502.

Under the reign of King John Zápolya (the last national ruler of Hungary) the palace was repaired. On the southern tip of the Castle Hill, the Great Rondella was built by Italian military engineers. The circular bastion is one of the main surviving structure of the old palace.

=== Ottoman Era ===
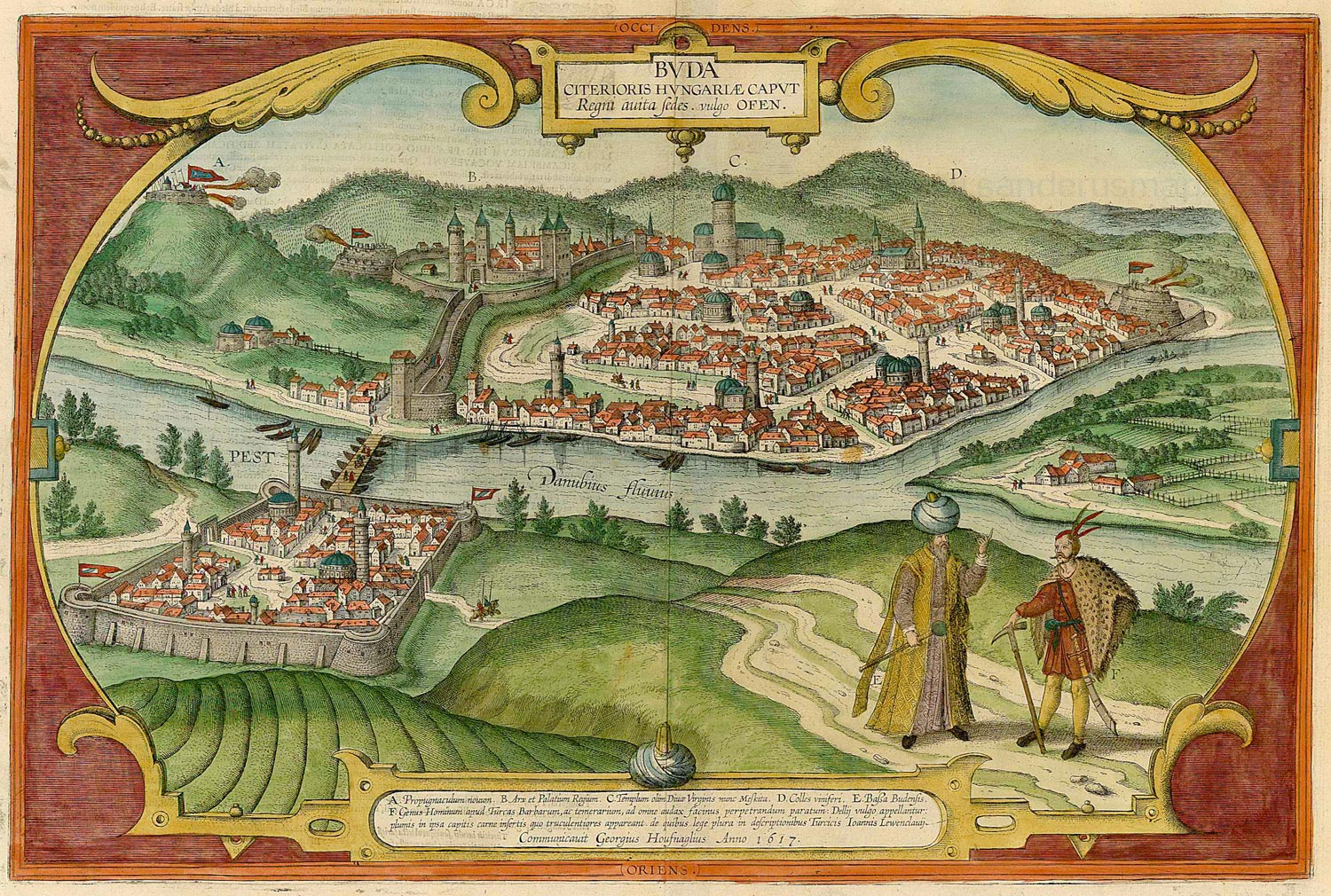
Georg Houfnagel's view of Buda in 1617

After the Battle of Mohács, the medieval Kingdom of Hungary collapsed. The Ottoman Turks occupied the evacuated town on 11 September 1526. Although Buda was sacked and burned, the Royal Palace was not damaged. Sultan Suleiman the Magnificent carried away all the bronze statues (the Hunyadis, Pallas Athene and Hercules) with him to Constantinople. The statues were destroyed there in a rebellion a few years later. The Sultan also took many volumes from the Bibliotheca Corviniana.

In 1529 the Ottoman army besieged and occupied Buda again, and the palace was badly damaged. On 29 August 1541 Buda was occupied again by the Ottomans, without any resistance. Buda became part of Ottoman Empire and the seat of the Budin Eyalet. The original German and Hungarian population left the city, immigrants from the Ottoman Empire and the Balkan peninsula came to their place.

Although Turkish travel writers wrote enthusiastically about the beauty of the palace of the Hungarian kings, the new Ottoman government let the palace decay. It was partially used as barracks a storage place and stables, and otherwise it stood empty.

The palace was called Iç Kala ("Inner Castle") and Hisar Peçe ("Citadel") by the Turks. The name of the cour d'honneur was "Seray meydani". The favourite nickname of the complex was "Palace of the Golden Apples".

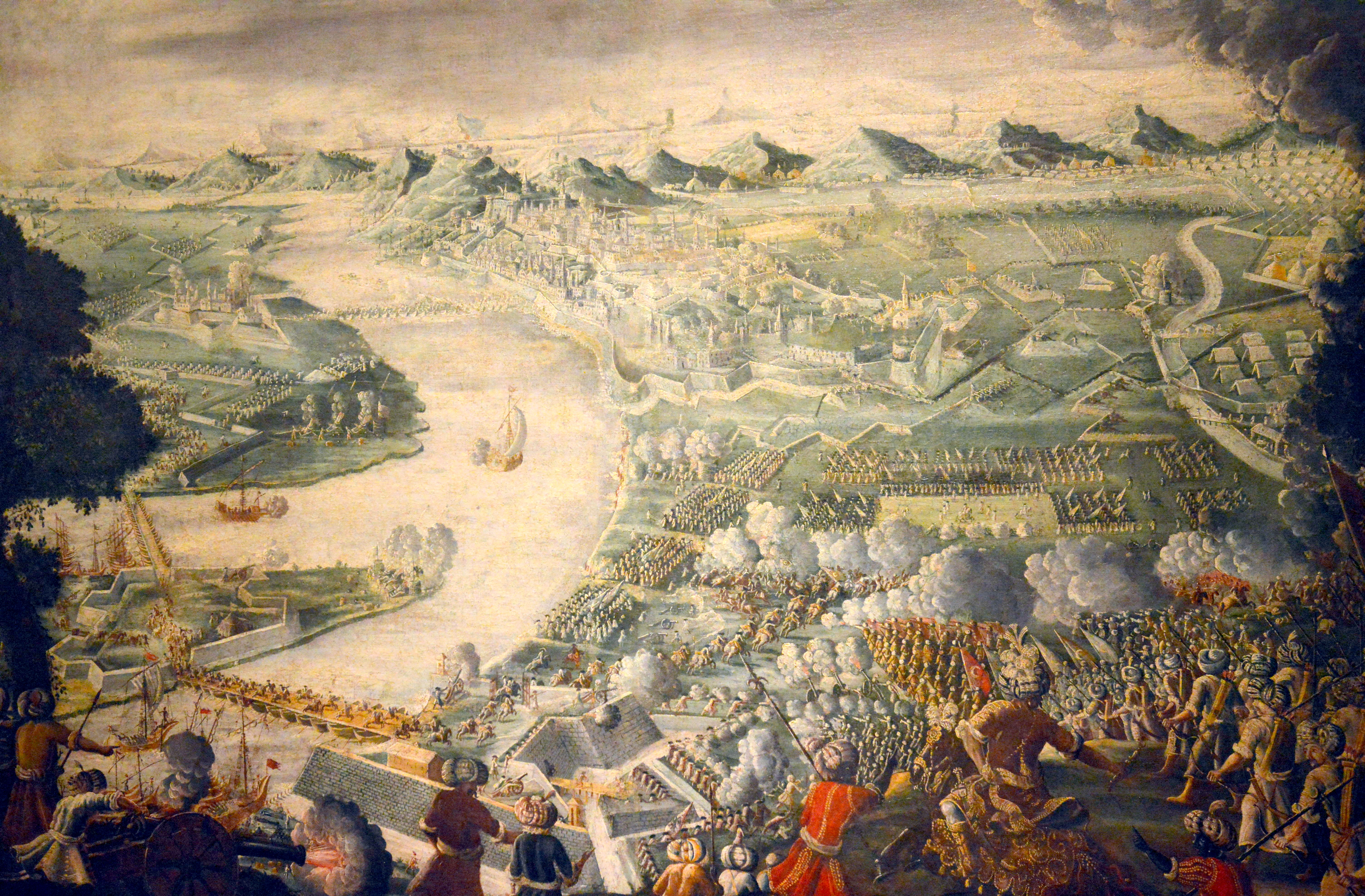
The Holy League took Buda after a long siege in 1686

The economic decline of Buda was characterised by the stagnation of population, which was not larger in 1686, than the population of the city two centuries earlier in the 15th century. The Ottomans allowed the Hungarian royal palace to fall into ruins. The disused palace was later transformed into a gunpowder storage and magazine by the Ottomans, which caused its detonation during the siege in 1686. The original Christian Hungarian population did not feel secure during the Ottoman conquest, their numbers significantly shrank in the next decades, due to their fleeing to the Habsburg ruled Royal Hungary. The proportion of the population who were of Jews and Gypsy families increased during the Ottoman rule in Buda.

In the era between 1541 and 1686, the Habsburgs tried to re-capture Buda several times. Unsuccessful sieges in 1542, 1598, 1603 and 1684 caused serious damage. The Ottoman authorities repaired only the fortifications. According to 17th-century sources, many buildings of the former Royal Palace were roofless and their vaults collapsed. Nonetheless, the medieval palace mostly survived until the great siege of 1686.

=== Destruction of the medieval castle ===
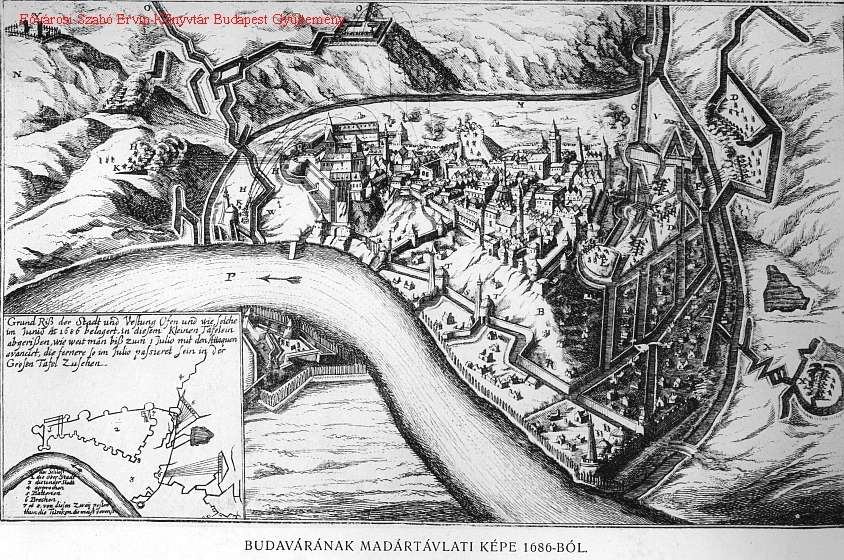
The great siege of Buda (1686); contemporary drawing

The medieval palace was destroyed in the great siege of 1686 when Buda was captured by allied Christian forces.

In 1686, two years after the unsuccessful siege of Buda, a renewed Western European Christian campaign was started to take the city. This time the Holy League's army was much larger, consisting of 65,000–100,000 men, including German, Hungarian, Croat, Dutch, English, Spanish, Czech, Italian, French, Burgundian, Danish and Swedish soldiers and other Europeans as volunteers, artillerymen and officers. The Turkish defenders consisted of 7,000 men.

In a heavy artillery bombardment, many buildings burned and collapsed. The Stephen's Tower, used as a gunpowder store by the Ottomans, exploded when hit by a single cannon, said to have been fired by a friar called Gábor, also referred as Tüzes Gábor ("Fiery Gabriel"). According to contemporary sources, the explosion killed as many as 1,500 Turkish soldiers and caused a wave on the Danube that washed away artillery batteries and guards standing on the opposite shore.

Habsburg military engineers made several plans and drawings of the buildings in subsequent decades. Although the walls mainly survived, the burned-out shell rapidly decayed from a lack of maintenance. Between 1702 and 1715, Stephen's Tower disappeared completely, and the palace was beyond repair. In 1715, King Charles III ordered the demolition of the ruins. Johann Hölbling surveyed the still-existing structures. The king ordered the surviving marble statues, antiquities, inscriptions and coins should be spared (there is no evidence about the realization of the royal decree). The main part of the palace and the Broken Tower were totally demolished, the hollows and moats were filled and a new flat terrace was established. The southern fortifications, zwingers and rooms were buried under tons of rubbish and earth.

=== Early Baroque palace ===
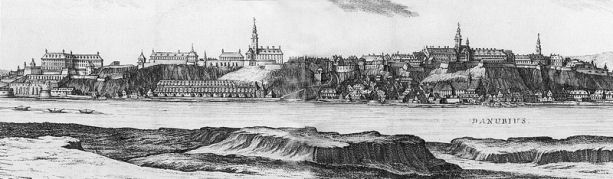
The royal castle built under King Charles III (1733)

In 1715 a small Baroque palace was built according to the plans of Johann Hölbling. It was a simple rectangular building, with an inner court and a shorter side wing, which was later demolished. The Hölbling palace is identical with the core of the present-day palace, where the Baroque Court of the Budapest Historical Museum is now located.

The interior of the palace was left unfinished when work stopped in 1719. The Hofkriegsrat commissioned Fortunato di Prati to make several plans for the palace, but lack of money hindered their implementation.

In 1723 the palace was accidentally burned down and the windows were walled up in order to stop further deterioration. Several drawings from the 1730s and 1740s show the unfinished decaying shell of the simple two-storey blockhouse. Some engravings show an idealised finished version which never existed. Sometime around 1730 the roof was repaired.

=== Era of Maria Theresa ===
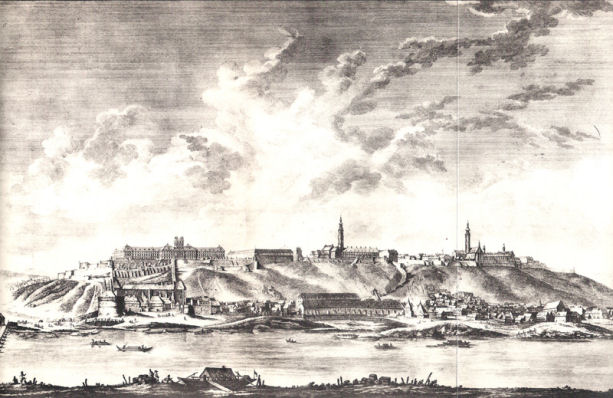
The royal castle during the reign of Maria Theresa (1777)

In 1748 Count Antal Grassalkovich, President of the Hungarian Chamber, appealed to the public to finish the derelict palace by means of public subscription. Palatine János Pálffy called upon the counties and cities to award grants for the project. The moment was favourable because relations between the Hungarian nobility and the Habsburgs were exceptionally good. The Hungarians supported Queen Maria Theresa in the dire need of the War of the Austrian Succession. The queen was grateful for this, and the new Royal Palace became the symbol of peace and friendship between the dynasty and the nation.

The plans of the splendid, U-shaped Baroque palace with a cour d'honneur were drawn by Jean Nicolas Jadot, chief architect of the Viennese court. After 1753 the plans were modified by his successor, Nicolò Pacassi. Ignác Oraschek, master builder, who guided the works, and modified the plans according to his own ideas. The foundation stone of the palace was laid on 13 May 1749, which was the Queen's birthday. The work continued at a good pace until 1758, when financial difficulties caused a seven-year break. By that time only the interiors were left unfinished.

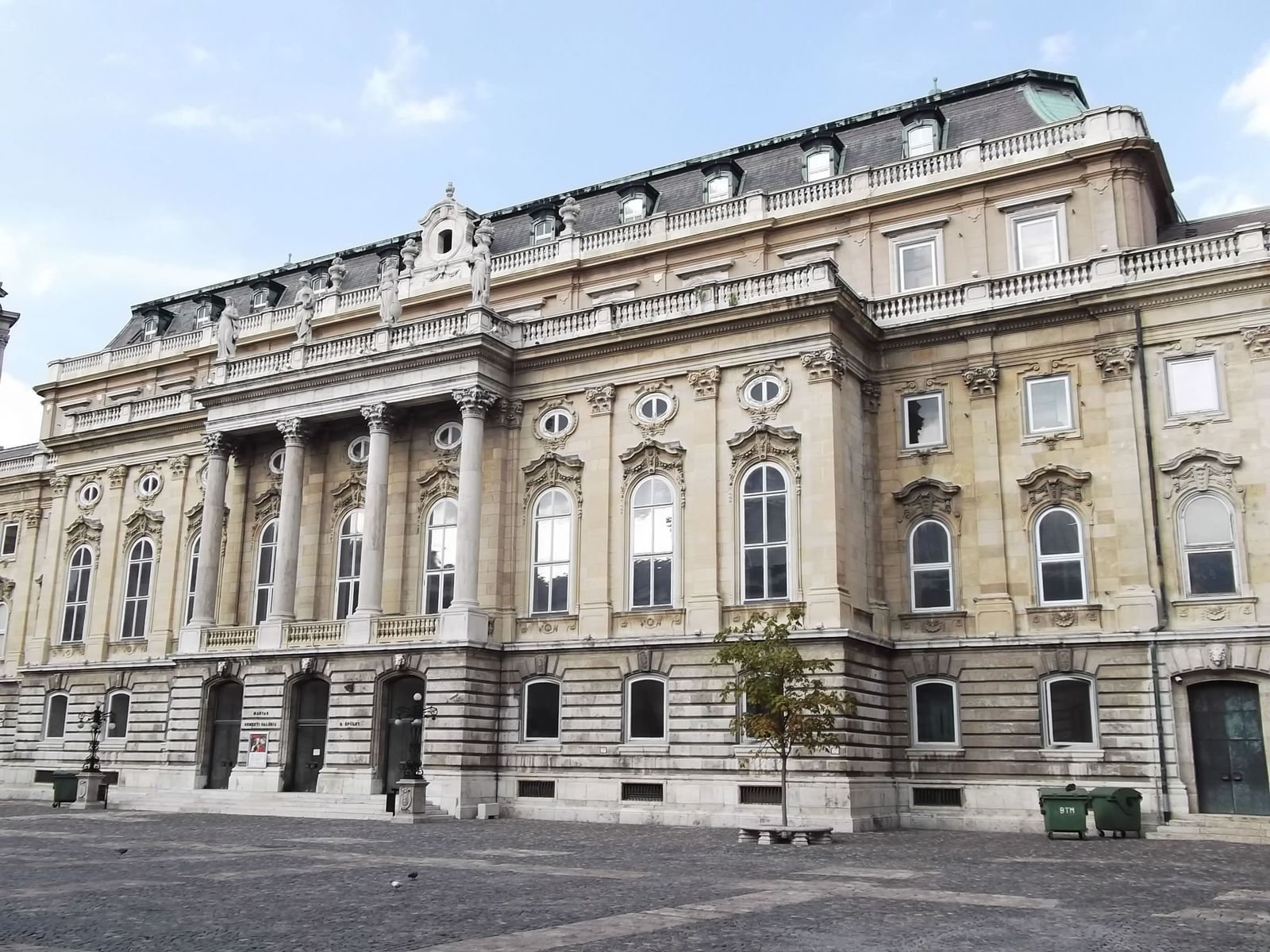
The façade of the cour d'honneur constructed under Hillebrandt in the 1760s

According to surviving historical documents, the layout of the palace followed Jadot's signed plans of 1749. The façades, some interior elements and the St. Sigismund Chapel are the works of Pacassi, while the special double false domes were probably planned by Oraschek, formerly the master builder of Count Grassalkovich. Double false domes were typical features of the so-called Grassalkovich-type Baroque castles like Gödöllő. However, this feature was later removed from the palace.

In 1764 the Queen visited the palace and allotted 20,000 thalers a year for the work, which recommenced in 1765 according to the plans of Franz Anton Hillebrandt. Hillebrandt altered the cour d'honneur façade of the central wing in Rococo style. In 1769 the St. Sigismund Chapel was consecrated and the palace was finished the same year. According to the aggregate statement of Grassalkovich, the costs were 402,679 forints.

=== Nuns and scholars ===
The future of the complex was uncertain; the Queen had no intention to use it as a royal residence, because she did not spend much time in Buda. In 1769 she gave one wing to the Sisters of Loreto, who came from Sankt Pölten. The building was handed over on 13 May 1770, but the elegant Baroque rooms were considered unsuitable for a nunnery. Alexander Keglevich, rector of the Eötvös Loránd University, had provided financing to Maria Theresa, which supposedly should have been repaid, according to her letters to her children and friends. In 1777 the Queen decided that the university of Nagyszombat should move to Buda.

The nuns moved out and the palace was hastily adapted to use as a university. The work was guided by Farkas Kempelen and led to classrooms, teacher's cabinets, museums, a library and a university press being built. In the front, the false dome was removed and a four-storey observatory tower, planned by Franz Anton Hillebrandt or Karl Georg Zillack, was erected.

In 1778 Hillebrandt built a new chapel for the first king of Hungary, Saint Stephen's, the mummified right hand, which was recovered by Queen Maria Theresa from the Republic of Ragusa in 1771. The Chapel of the Holy Right was situated near the St Sigismund Chapel, in the middle of an inner court. The outer form was octagonal and the inside was oval, crowned by a dome. The altar-piece was painted by Joseph Hauzinger.

The ribbon-cutting ceremony of the university was held on 25 June 1780, the 40th anniversary of the coronation of the Queen. The throne room became a splendid aula decorated with frescoes depicting the four faculties. In 1953, two grisaille frescoes were discovered on the shorter sides of the room.

=== Residence of the Palatines ===
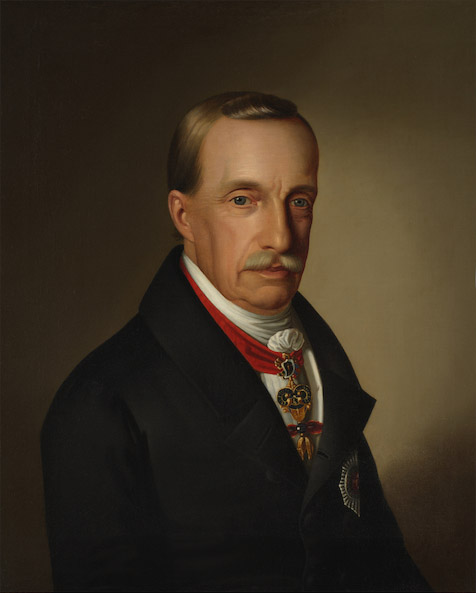
Archduke Joseph Anton, Palatine of Hungary, resided in the castle.

Functional problems of the university remained unresolved, which led to the faculties being moved to Pest in 1783. In 1791 the palace became the residence of the new Habsburg Palatine of the Kingdom of Hungary, Archduke Alexander Leopold of Austria. After the early death of the palatine in 1795, his younger brother Archduke Joseph succeeded him, followed by Archduke Stephen. The palatinal court in Buda Castle was the centre of fashionable life and high society in the Hungarian capital.

In 1810 the palatinal palace was damaged by fire, but in the next decades, plans were made to raise the building with an upper storey, but they were not implemented, although the observatory tower, which hindered the work, was removed. In 1838 the crypt of the St. Sigismund Chapel was rebuilt according to the plans of Franz Hüppmann: the Palatinal Crypt was the burial place of Palatine Joseph and his family. The crypt is the only part of the palace that survived the Second World War.

Palatine Joseph established gardens on the southern and eastern hillsides of the Castle Hill according to the plans of Antal Tost. The gardens of Buda Castle were among the most famous English-style landscape gardens in Hungary.

Palatine Stephen left the palace on 23 September 1848 during the Hungarian Revolution of 1848.

On 5 January Buda was occupied by the Austrian army led by Alfred I, Prince of Windisch-Grätz. The chief commander lodged in the royal palace.

On 4 May 1849, the Hungarian army, led by Artúr Görgey, laid siege to Buda Castle, which was being defended by General Heinrich Hentzi. On 20 May the Hungarians captured Buda with an assault. The palace was the last stronghold of the Austrian troops, and became a site of heavy artillery fighting. The ensuing fire consumed the central and southern wings; they were completely burned out and their interiors were destroyed.

=== Era of Franz Joseph ===
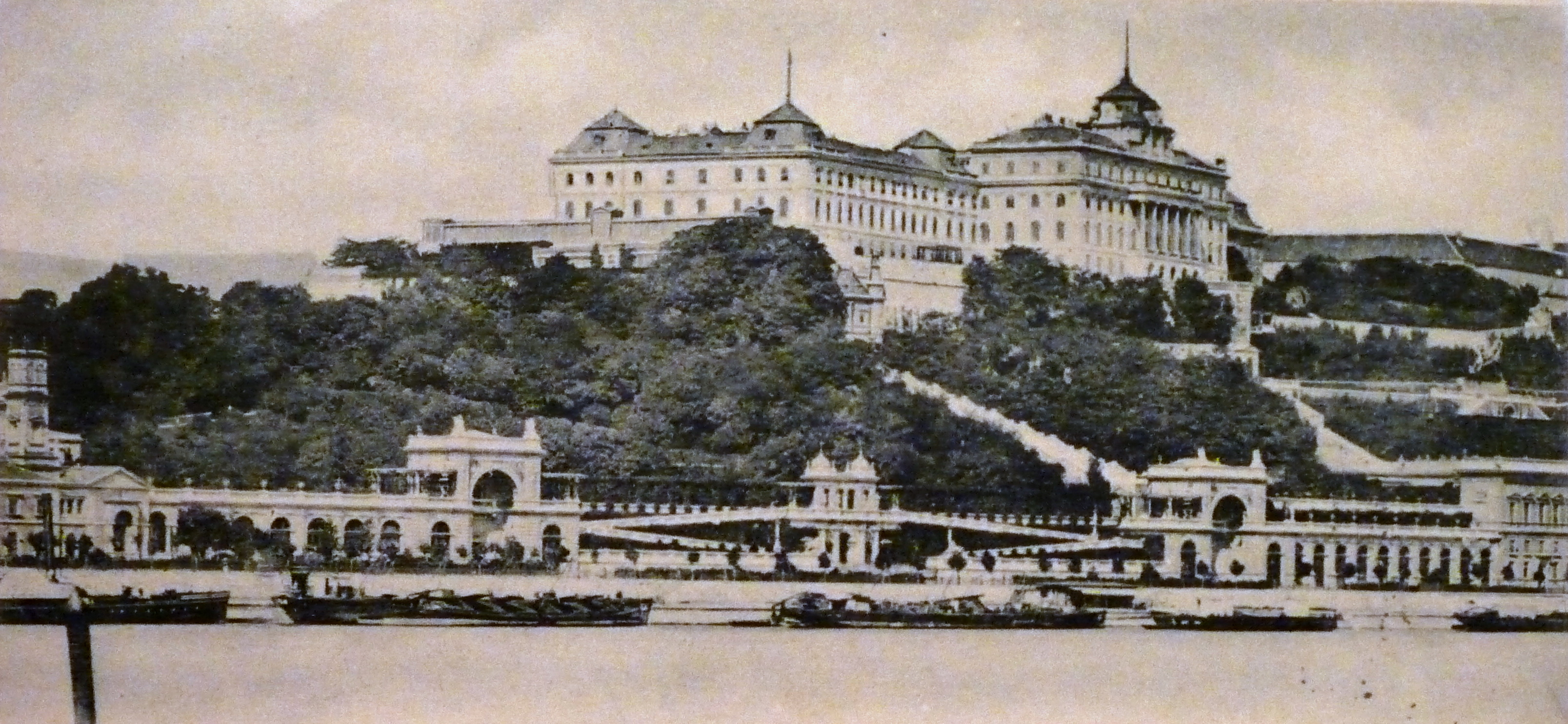
Buda Castle before its remodeling in the 1880s

The palace was rebuilt between 1850 and 1856 by Josef Weiss and Carl Neuwirth. The 13-axis central wing was raised with a third storey and a squat attic-tower. The central risalit was decorated with a balcony of six colossal columns. With these changes, the former Viennese Baroque palace of Maria Theresa became considered a more austere Neoclassical Baroque building.

The ballroom was redecorated with marbles and stuccoes. After 1853 stately rooms were designed in a French Rococo style, with white-gold stuccoes and furniture from the Hofburg. The palace was already too small for the needs of the royal court, so the kitchens and service rooms were housed in the neighbouring Zeughaus. The palace was connected with the Zeughaus by a glassed passageway.

On the western side of the cour d'honneur two smaller buildings were erected, using plans by Weiss and Neuwirth in 1854. The two-storey Stöckl housed the apartments of the archdukes and imperial officials, whereas the Wachlokal was built for the royal guards.

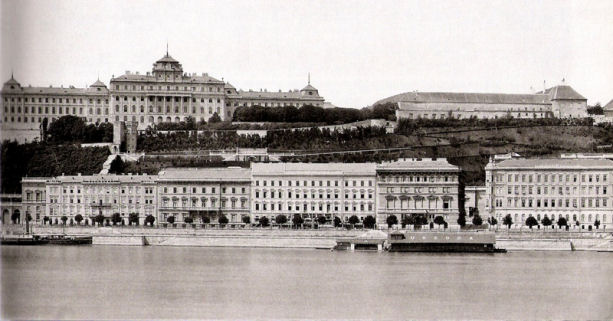
View of the castle before its remodeling, as seen from the Danube

Emperor Franz Joseph I of Austria visited Buda Castle in 1856 and 1857. After the Austro-Hungarian Compromise of 1867, Franz Joseph was crowned King of Hungary. The palace played an important part in the lavish ceremony and was a symbol of peace between the dynasty and the nation.

In the last decades of the 19th century Budapest experienced rapid economic development. Ambitious urban planning projects were carried out to express the growing wealth and higher status of the Hungarian capital, with special attention being paid to the rebuilding of Buda Castle. The autonomous Hungarian government intended to create a royal palace to match any famous European royal residence (especially their old rival, Vienna's Hofburg). The rebuilding spanned forty years, between 1875 and 1912, and caused sweeping changes in topography of the entire area.

First the Várkert-bazár (Royal Garden Pavilion) was built on the embankment of the Danube, at the foot of the Castle Hill, between 1875 and 1882. This Neo-Renaissance gateway was designed by a Hungarian architect named Miklós Ybl. The structure was an open arcade, with pavilions, stairways and ramps, and two blocks of flats. Ybl also built a new waterworks pumping station, named Várkert-kioszk (Royal Garden Kiosk), and two stair towers against the medieval cortina walls. The southern stair tower followed French Renaissance style, resembling a small turreted castle, while the northern stair tower was similar to a Gothic brick donjon (a fortified main tower from a castle, also called a keep). Only Várkert-bazár and Várkert-kioszk survive currently.

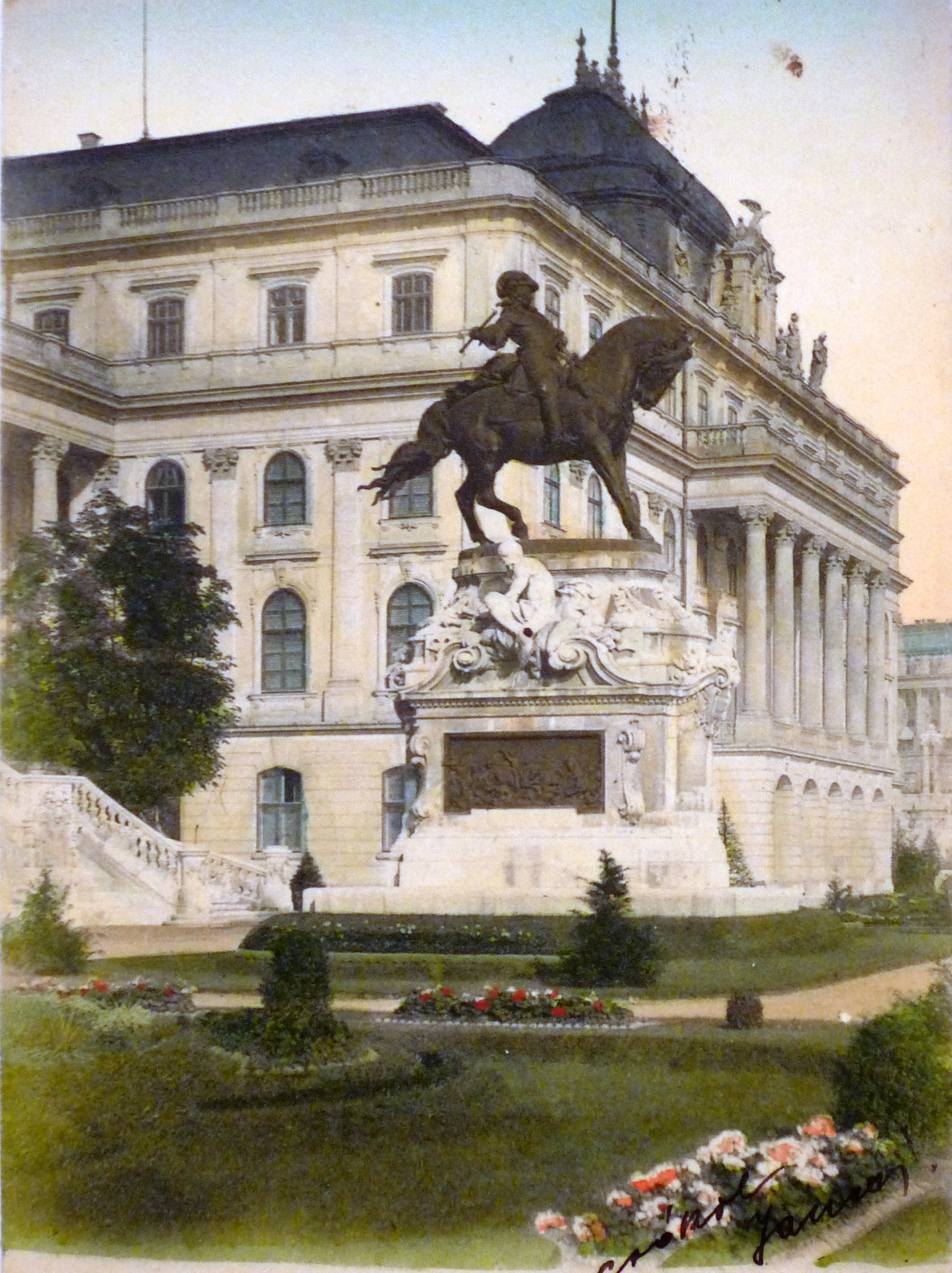
The Danube terrace with Eugene of Savoy's monument

In 1882 Prime Minister Kálmán Tisza charged Ybl with drawing a master plan for rebuilding the palace. In his 1885 plan, Ybl preserved the old Baroque palace, but mirrored it on the western side of the cour d'honneur, which doubled the size of the residence. He also planned a new carriageway on the western hillside, demolishing the medieval walls and towers of the Újvilág-kert terrace. The narrowness of the natural plateau of the Castle Hill meant there was not enough space for the new Krisztinaváros wing, which Ybl solved by erecting a substructure down to the foot of the hill. The monumental western façade sits on this windowless, three-storey high substructure. The whole block covered almost the entire hill, but the main façade on the cour d'honneur had the same modest height as the Baroque palace. The façade was clad with stone slabs, while the old parts are stuccoed; hence, the difference between the original Baroque and the Neo-Renaissance wings is obvious. The formerly open cour d'honneur became a closed court with an arched gateway, guarded by the four lions of the sculptor, János Fadrusz. The court is called Lions Court (or Oroszlános udvar).

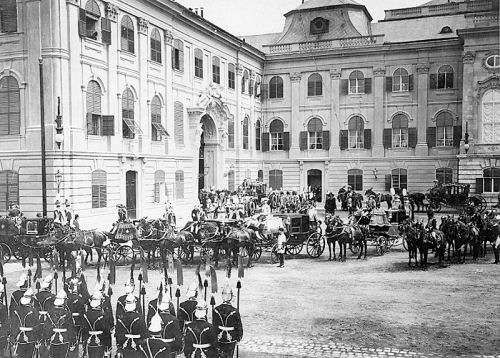
Royal procession in the western courtyard (1880s)

The work began on 1 May 1890, but Ybl died on 22 January 1891. His successor, Alajos Hauszmann, slightly modified the plans of the Krisztinaváros wing. In 1896 the building reached the level of the court, and King Franz Joseph ceremoniously laid down the foundation stone of the palace, which was soon completed.

In 1893, the 25th anniversary of King Franz Joseph's coronation was celebrated in the Royal Palace. However, the old banqueting hall proved to be too small, so Hauszmann enlarged the room by knocking down and reconstructing the wall towards the cour d'honneur (which additionally had the Hillebrandt façade).

In spite of this expansion and Ybl's new wing, the palace was still deemed insufficient for great royal celebrations, so another round of construction began. The north wing, standing on the site of the old Zeughaus, was completely designed by Hauszmann. The architect doubled the Baroque palace on the Danube side, generally imitating its traditional architectural style. At the meeting point of the old and the new wings, a colonnaded portico was erected, with a lavishly decorated tympanum (with allegorical statues by Károly Sennyey) and a flight of stairs called the Habsburg Stairs. The whole palace was crowned with a dome with a copy of the Crown of St. Stephen at its apex. The dome, like other details of the north wing, shows German Jugendstil influences, as does the rear façade towards the western forecourt. This forecourt also contains the Matthias Fountain (Hungarian: Mátyás kútja) by sculptor Alajos Stróbl. Above the main gate, towards Szent György tér, stood a statue of the Goddess Hungaria. This side was the main façade of the complex, but it was much shorter and less characteristic than the long Danube façade. The old Chapel of the Holy Right was demolished to make room for a carriageway.

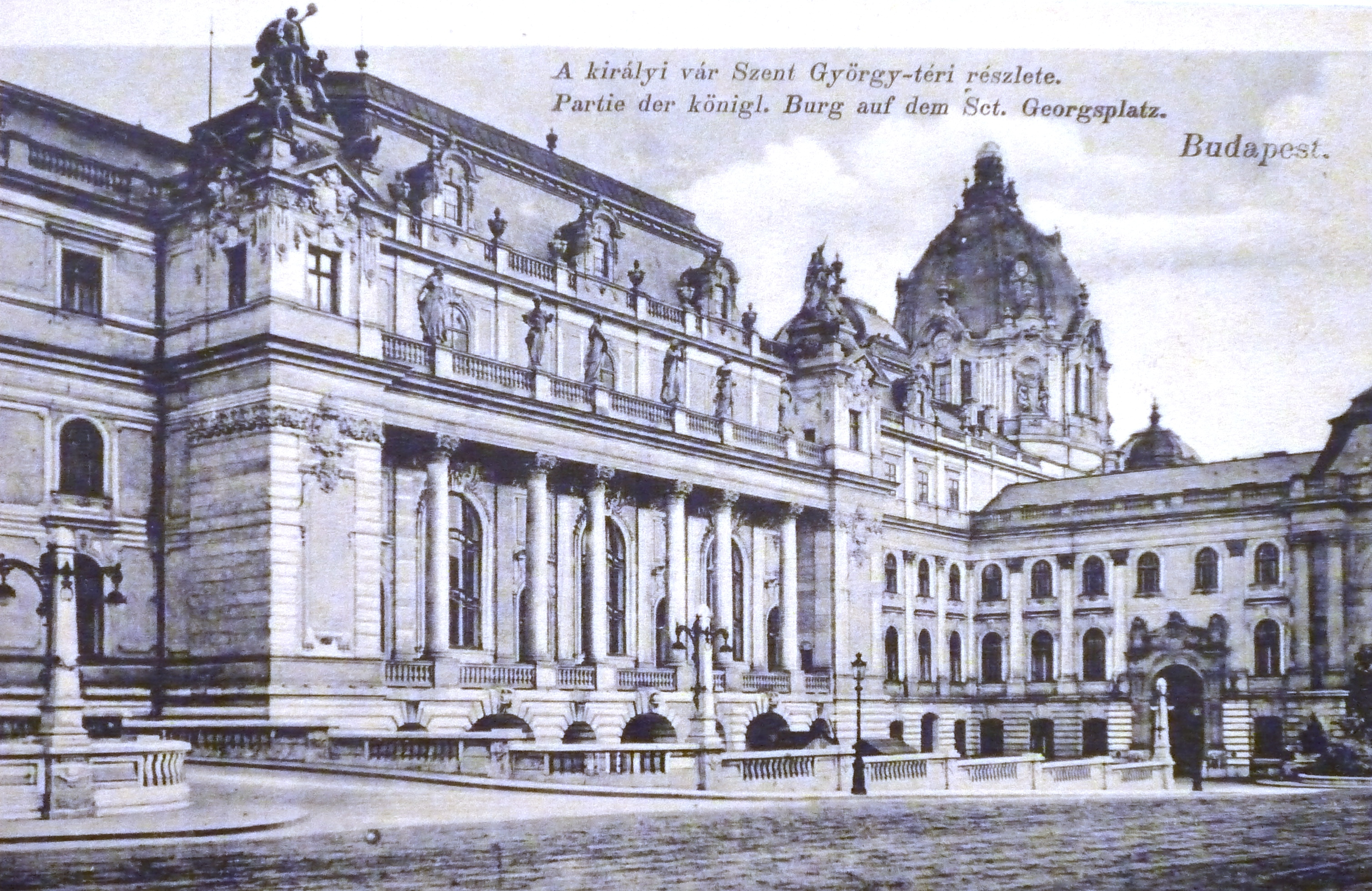
The western forecourt with the facade of the Grand Ballroom

Hauszmann designed a new riding school in the former Újvilág terrace, which was now named the Csikós court, after the Csikós statue of György Vastagh (now in the western forecourt). In front of the long Danube façade, an equestrian statue was erected in honour of Prince Eugene of Savoy, the victorious leader of the Habsburg army in the Battle of Zenta. The eastern forecourt was closed off with a lavish wrought-iron rail, which ended in a pillar crowned by a statue of the legendary Turul, the sacred bird of the Magyars, spreading its wings above Budapest. Two flights of stairs led up to the Szent György tér, which was on much higher ground.

In the western forecourt, Hauszmann designed a new neo-Baroque guardhouse and rebuilt the old Royal Stables. The Royal Gardens on the southern hillside were famous for their precious plants, glass houses and picturesque terraces. In the middle of the gardens stood the Swiss House of Queen Elisabeth, furnished with Hungarian folk art objects. The house was built above the ruins of the medieval gatehouse, partially making use of them.

The interior of the palace was decorated and furnished exclusively with works of the leading Hungarian artists of the age. The Royal Palace was officially inaugurated in 1912. Contemporary critics praised it as the most outstanding Hungarian building of the turn of the 20th century.

=== Interbellum years and World War II ===
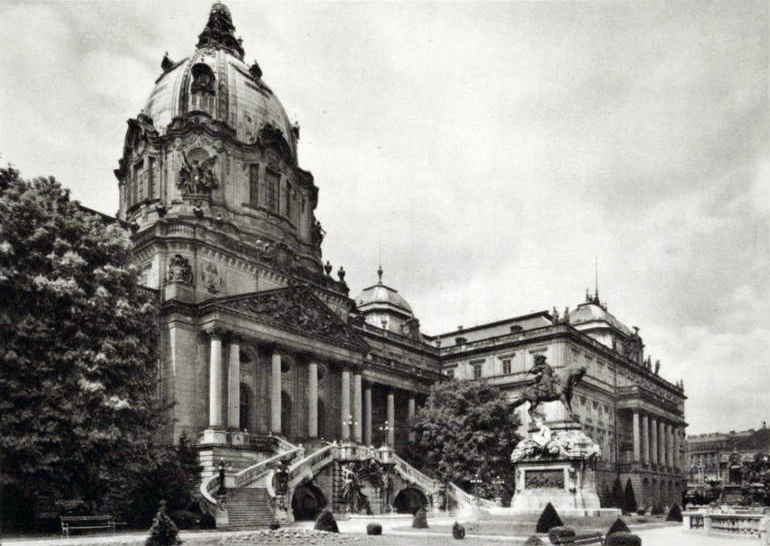
View of the dome and the terrace with Prince Eugene's monument (1926)

The Hauszmann palace existed for around three decades: on 30 December 1916, the building played a part in the coronation ceremony of the last Hungarian king, Charles IV of Hungary. After the 1918 revolution and the removal of the Habsburg dynasty, the Royal Palace became the seat of the new regent of the Kingdom of Hungary, Miklós Horthy. Horthy lived in the Krisztinaváros wing with his family between the years of 1920 and 1944. In this era the palace was the centre of Hungarian political and social life. Famous guests entertained by Horthy in the palace included King Victor Emmanuel III of Italy in 1937 and Cardinal Eugenio Pacelli (later Pope Pius XII) in 1938.

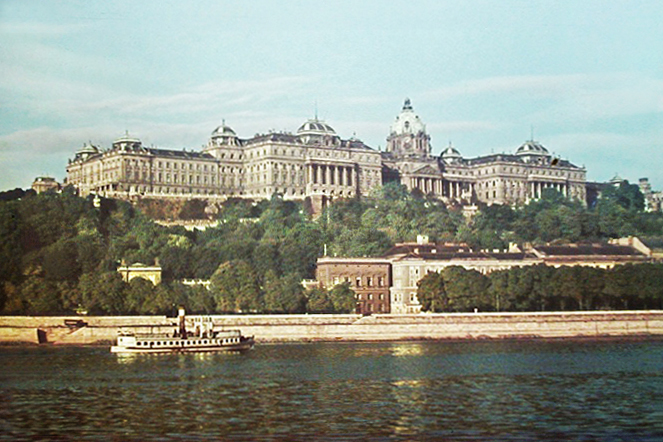
The Royal Palace in the 1930s

On 16 October 1944 a Nazi German commando unit, led by Otto Skorzeny, occupied the Royal Palace and forced the regent to abdicate. Buda Castle was the last major stronghold of Budapest held by Axis forces during the siege of Budapest between 29 December 1944 and 13 February 1945. The German and Hungarian forces defending the castle attempted to break the Soviet blockade on 11 February 1945, but failed. Allegedly the Soviet Red Army knew about their plans and had aimed heavy weapons at the possible escape routes hours earlier. This is considered one of the biggest disasters of Hungarian military history.

Heavy fights and artillery fire reduced the palace to ruins. The furniture vanished, roofs and vaults collapsed and the southern and western wings were burned out. The destruction was comparable to that of the great siege of 1686.

=== Reconstruction ===
Immediately after the war, archaeological research was begun in order to unearth the remains of the medieval castle. The research, led by László Gerő (1946–1966) and László Zolnay (1967–1979), was likely the biggest castle excavation in Europe. The former Royal Gardens stairways, pavilions and glass houses, which dated from the turn of the 20th century, had to be sacrificed. Important parts of the former Sigismund and Matthias Palace had survived under the thick earth fill.

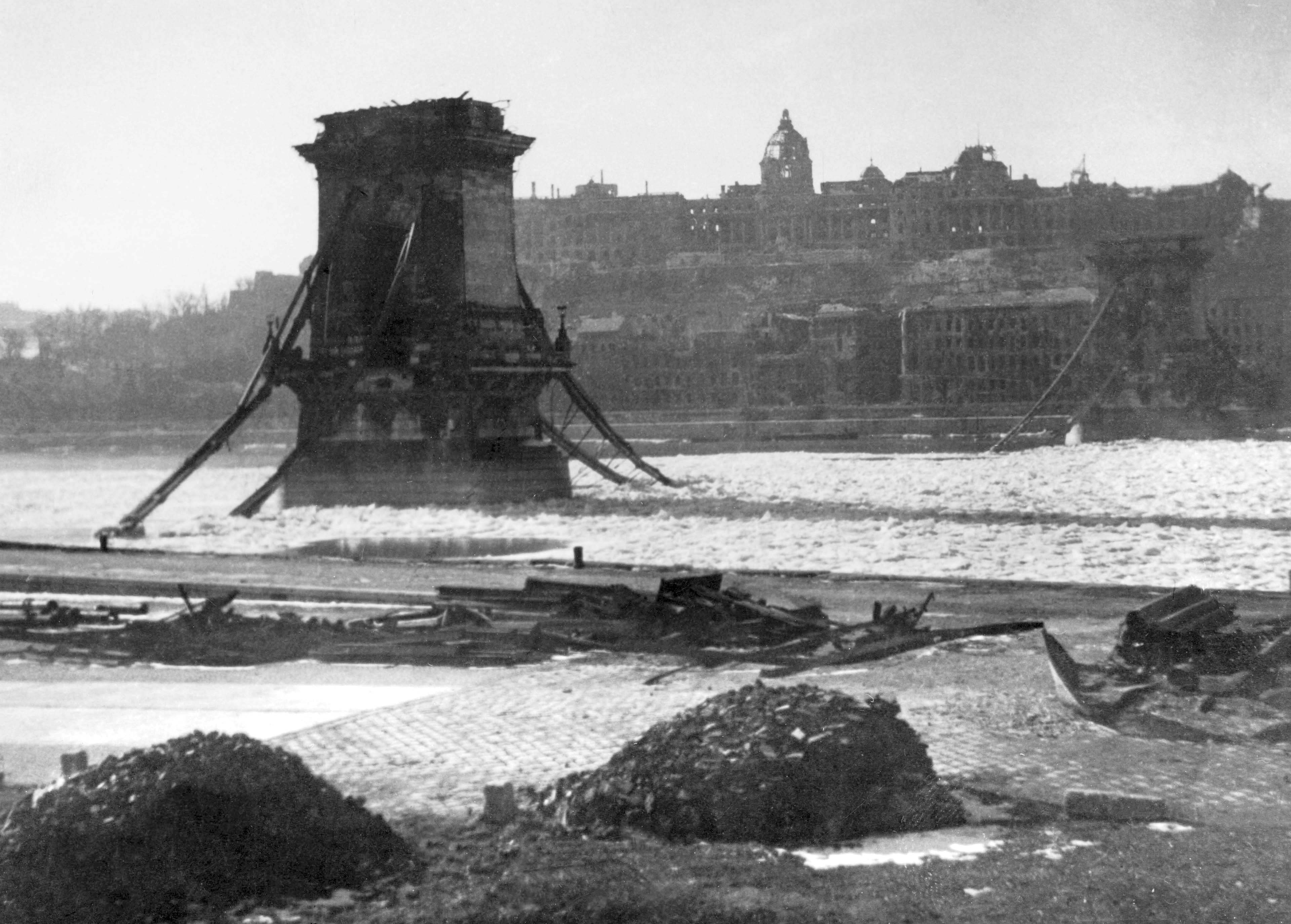
The burned-out ruins of the Royal Palace and the Chain Bridge (1946)

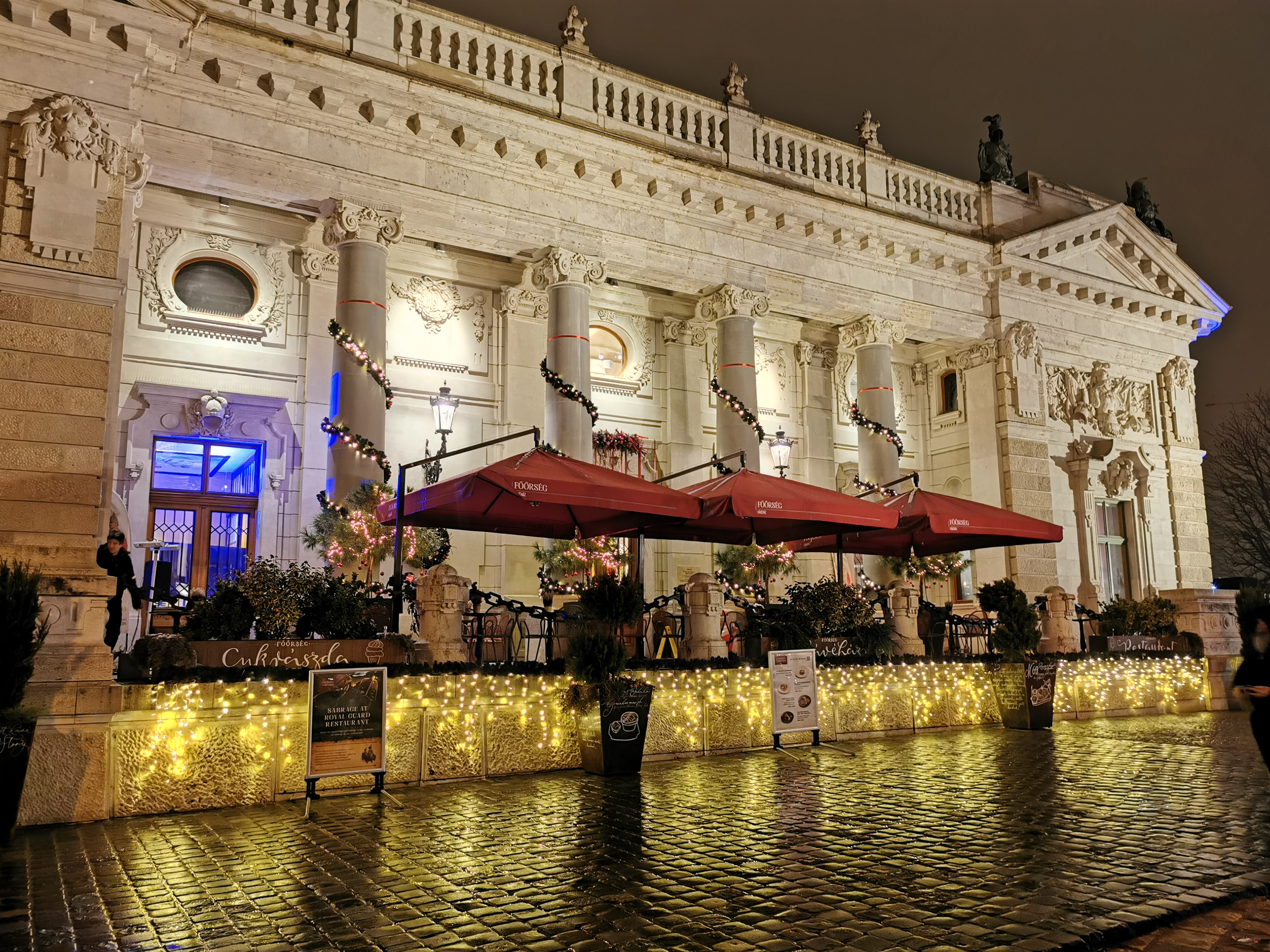
Royal Guard building, Buda

The first reconstruction plan of the medieval remains was written by László Gerő in 1950 and finalised in 1952. The reconstruction work was finished in 1966. Contrary to the generally accepted principles of historic reconstruction, the medieval fortification system was rebuilt in its entirety. Important elements like the 16th century Great Rondella and the medieval Gatehouse, the Mace Tower, the walls and the zwingers were reconstructed according to the results of the archaeological research and contemporary pictorial evidence. The low-lying southern wing of the Gothic palace was also reconstructed, together with the vaulted Gothic Hall and the Lower Church of the former Royal Chapel. Medieval-style gardens were planted in the zwingers. The foundation of the Stephen's Tower was unearthed, but as archaeological evidence was lacking, the tower was not reconstructed. The remains of the Broken Tower were covered again.

The large-scale reconstruction of the medieval fortifications substantially changed the cityscape of Budapest. At the time it was considered a highly successful project, reconciling historical authenticity with urban-planning demands.

In the 1970s, archeological research continued on the northern and western side of the palace, led by László Zolnay. It produced many important achievements, including the Late Gothic Buda Castle Statues. The Karakash Pasha Tower, in the Újvilág Garden, was a Turkish-era tower demolished at the end of the 19th century. Photographic evidence enabled its reconstruction, but the new tower was only a copy of the original, and the details are not considered authentic.

=== Modernization ===
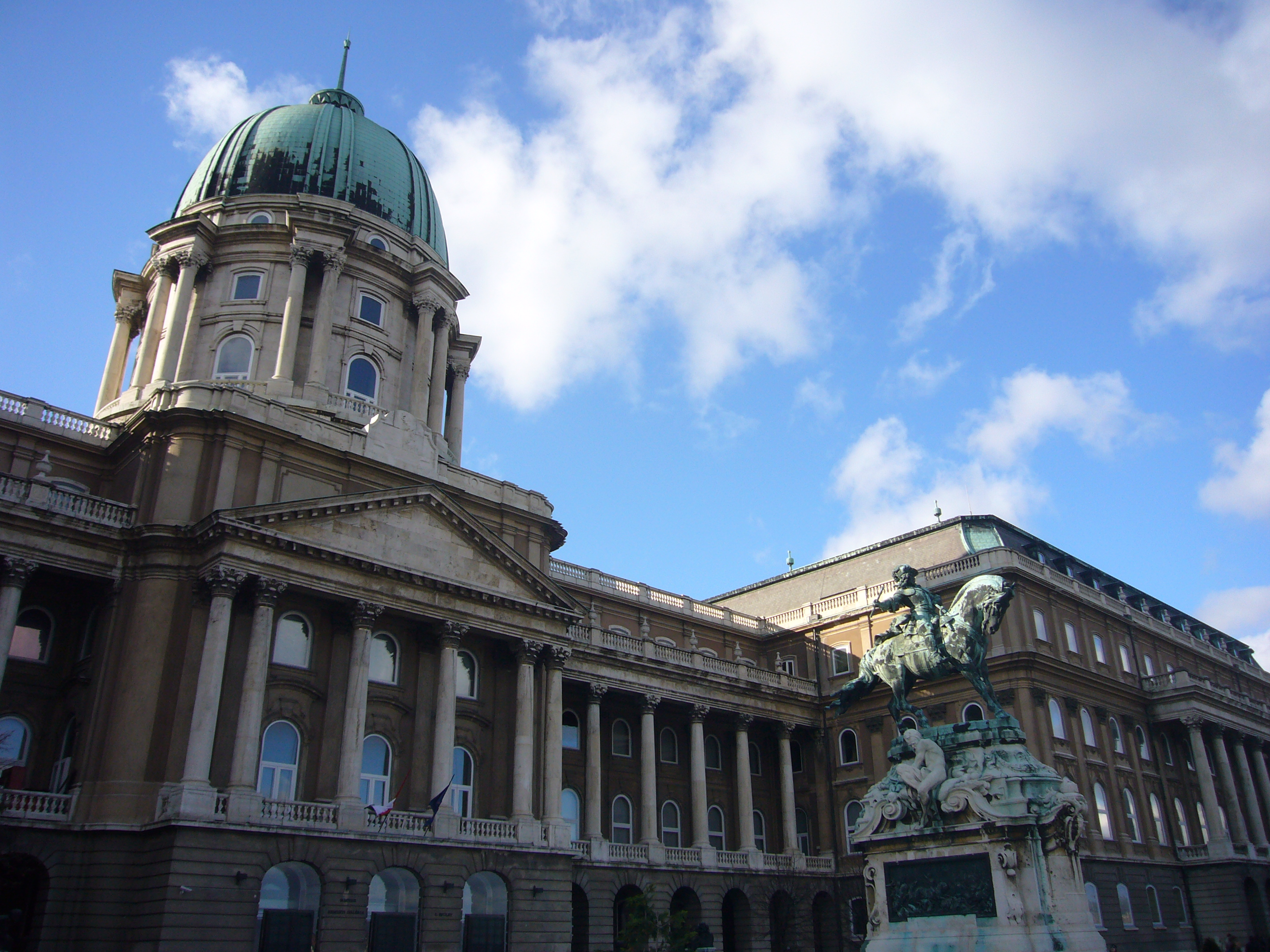
The modernist dome designed by Lajos Hidasi in 1961. Vast amounts of art work and sculpture on the exterior and almost all of the interior that survived the war were intentionally destroyed during the postwar reconstruction.

The government made a decision about reconstruction only in 1948. According to contemporary photos, all the important interiors were in a damaged state, but their reconstruction was technically possible. The new communist government of Hungary considered the Royal Palace a symbol of the former regime. Therefore, Hungarian leaders chose to thoroughly modernise the interior and exterior of the palace. Architectural trends played a part in the decision, as modernist architects had condemned the Hauszmann style as "too ornate".

The first modernist reconstruction plan was made by architect István Janáky in 1950. His controversial concept was later modified. In 1952 the Hungarian government asked for help from Poland, because they had successfully rebuilt Warsaw and, indeed, other cities. A delegation of Polish experts, led by the architectural historian Jan Zachwatowicz, proposed the rebuilding of the Hauszmann palace.

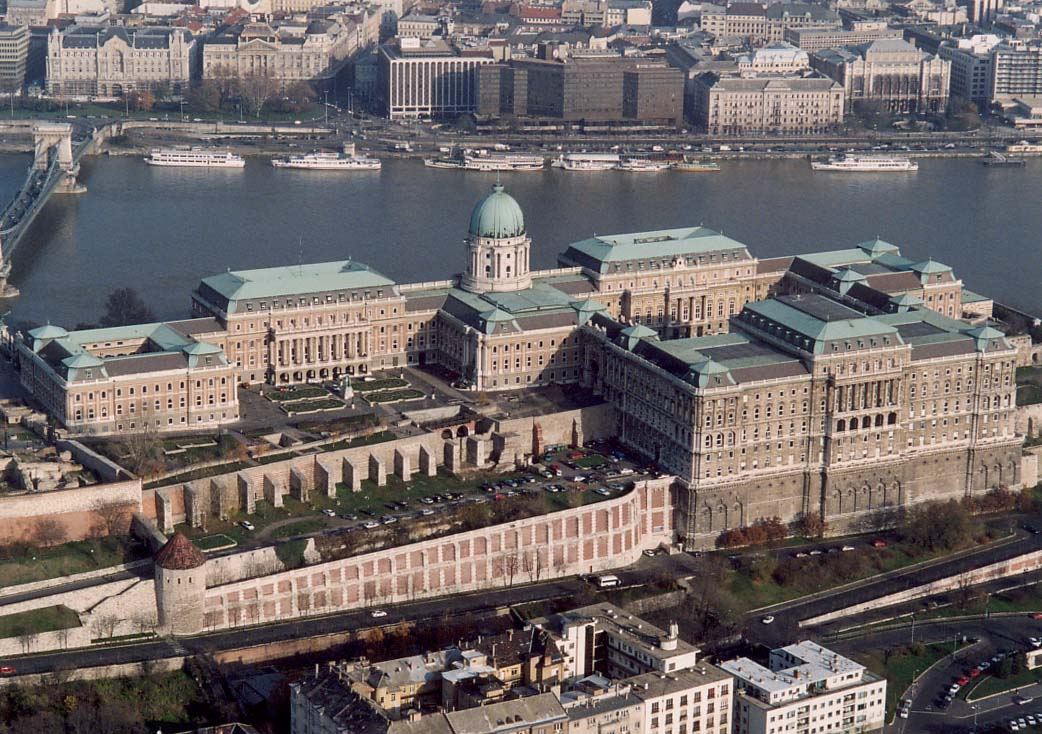
Aerial view of the castle in 2006

During the 1950s the palace was gutted and all the remaining interior, including the rooms and halls that were undamaged, were destroyed. Important exterior details, such as the main entrance, the Habsburg Steps, the dome, the Royal Stables, the guardhouse and the riding school were demolished, and the remaining façades were simplified. In Lions Court the ornate gates of King's Stairs and Diplomat's Stairs were demolished. The doorway of the castle church disappeared, as did the chapel. The detailed Neo-Baroque roofs were simplified and plain new windows were installed. The allegorical sculpture group of the tympanum was destroyed.

At the same time, medieval elements were uncovered and reconstructed. No precise drawings existed of them, so an approximate reconstruction of their appearance was done.

The modernist dome was designed by Lajos Hidasi in 1961 after Italian Baroque models. The palace was rebuilt by 1966, but the interior spaces were ready only in the 1980s. Buda Castle became a cultural centre, home to three museums and the National Széchényi Library.

=== 21st century ===
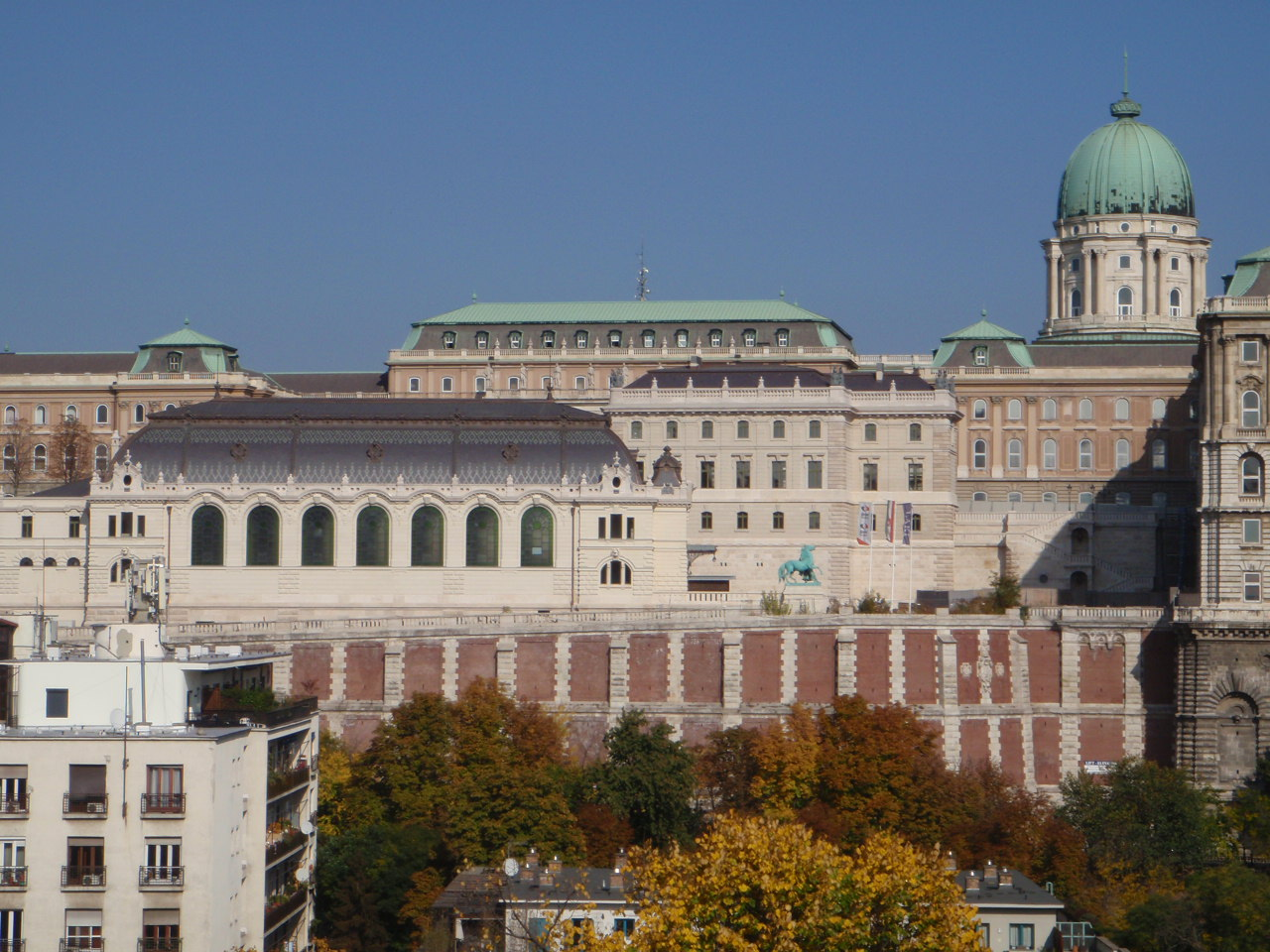
From left to right: the reconstructed Royal Riding Hall, Castle Guards' Barracks and Stöckl Staircase in 2019

In March 2006 the National Office of Cultural Heritage finalised the long-term development plan of Buda Castle. Asserting that the modernisation in 1952–66 caused irreversible damage, they proposed the partial reconstruction of the façades, including the dome and the Habsburg Steps. No decision has been reached about the realization of the development plan.

On 25 July 2007 Prime Minister Ferenc Gyurcsány chose the medieval King's Cellar in Buda Castle as the place to announce the list of the "most important public works projects", which was financed by European Union funds between 2007 and 2013.

In 2008 an international consortium began to build an underground garage for 700 cars under the former Csikós Court. The developer was granted permission to demolish a 4.5-metre-long (15 ft) section of the 15th-century castle wall. The demolition was carried out in spite of criticism from archeologists and the public. The area had been previously excavated by archeologists, who discovered many important finds, including medieval children's toys and a tooth from the pet leopard of King Matthias Corvinus. Additionally, the area outside the inner walls was used as a garbage dump during the 15th–17th centuries. However, financial difficulties interrupted the construction of the garage in 2009; work resumed for a short time in November 2011 but stopped again after the completion of the concrete basement slab. The government granted 1.3 billion forint for the completion of the project in 2015 after the half-built garage was bought by the state. The castle courtyard was also used as the setting for Katy Perry's 2010 music video, "Firework", part of her Teenage Dream album.

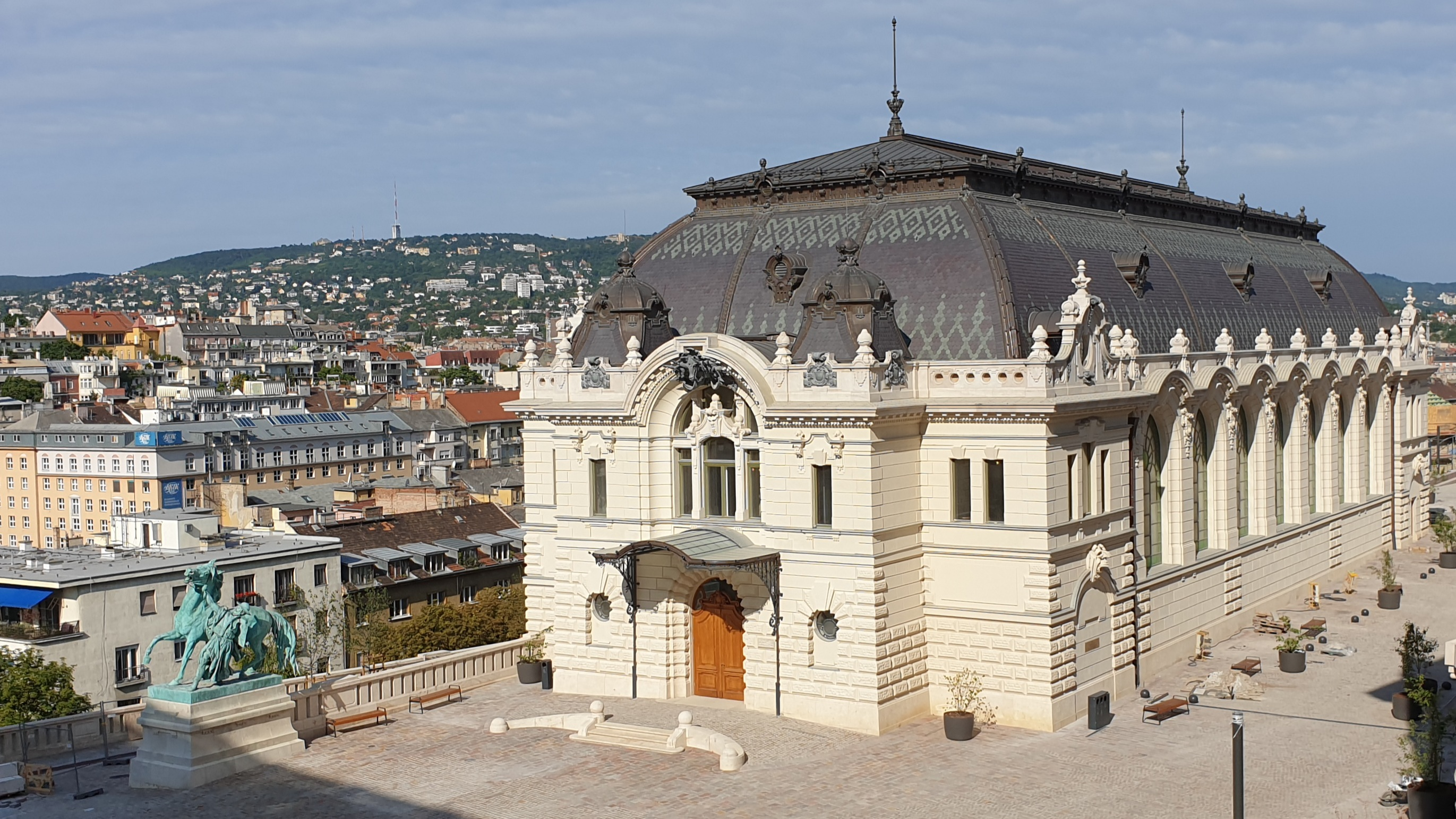
The reconstructed Royal Riding Hall

The government formulated the "National Hauszmann Program" to revitalize and restore the castle in the period of 2019−2030. The program is named in honour of Alajos Hauszmann, the last major architect of the castle. The first phase of the program started in 2016. By 2019, the reconstruction of the Royal Riding hall, Stöckl Staircase and the Castle Guards' Barrack had been completed and the rebuilding of the Ybl Slope next to the barrack started. In the same year, further reconstructions were announced, namely Archduke Joseph's Palace, the former Headquarters of the Ministry of Defense, and the former Ministry of Foreign Affairs' building.

In 2019, the prime minister's residence was relocated to the castle from the Hungarian Parliament Building. The move was first planned in 2002 during the first Fidesz government, but was never carried out.

Critics of the Orbán government cited the 1,000bn forint Hauszmann Program as an example of Orban's wasteful spending, and a "land grab". After his victory in the 2026 elections, Péter Magyar "made great social media entertainment" through his tours of the reconstructed sections of the Castle and other Hauszmann Program buildings, calling some of them "fake" and saying they were built for the benefit of Orbán and his ministers.

== Medieval wing ==
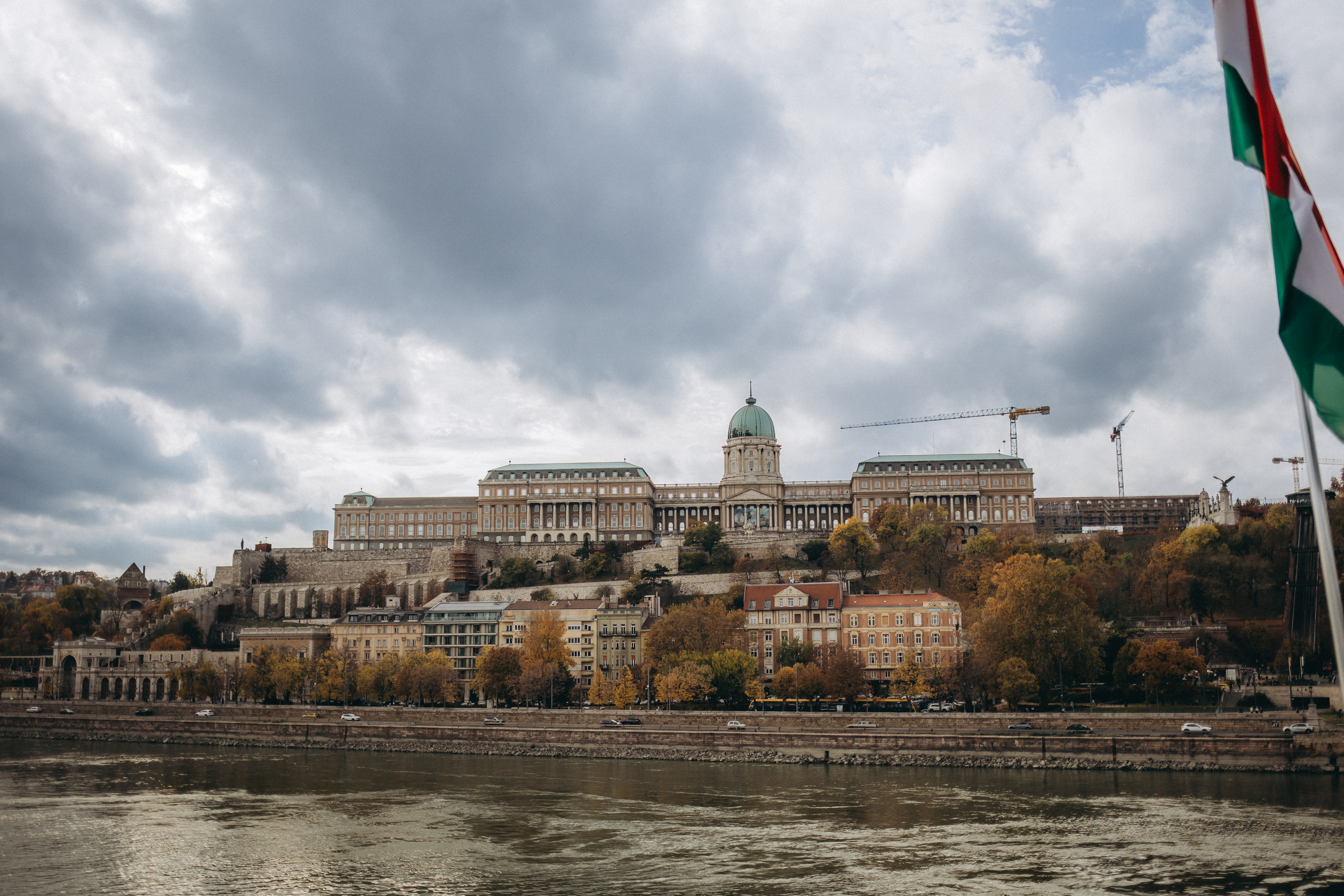
The castle viewed from the Danube in 2026; the medieval sections can be partially seen to the left

In 1958–1962, architect László Gerő partially recreated the façades of the Gothic castle facing the narrow southern, western and eastern courts. Only the ground and first floors were reconstructed; the castle was originally much higher. The unfinished façade stops at the level of the Baroque terrace above, with two windows opening towards the southern court and another two opening towards the eastern court. The four almost-identical windows are square, four-panel stone constructions of very fine Gothic craftsmanship, with their outer frames decorated with small columns. One window, which had been walled up, was discovered in situ during archeological research, and the others were reconstructed from fragments by the sculptor Ernő Szakál by means of anastylosis. The ground floor openings are simpler. An arched stone doorway gives access to the southern court from the cellar under the Gothic Hall.

The façade was originally plastered. The whitewashed surface was decorated with a painted pattern in a rusty hue, resembling rustication. Fragments of painted geometrical decoration, a common feature on the medieval buildings of Buda, were discovered on the eastern façade, but it was not restored.

A Gothic balcony tower projects from the wall at the end of the eastern façade. Its reconstruction was a much debated issue, because the balcony tower goes above the level of the Baroque terrace, disturbing the harmonious panorama of the palace. On the other hand, it clearly indicates that there are higher, missing floors.

The balcony tower is a two-storey structure standing on a wide stone basement. The first floor is a solid stone wall without any openings and the niche behind it belongs to the Gothic Hall. The second floor has a balcony with three windows; it is now closed off by a glass wall. Originally it would have been part of an important ceremonial room. The balcony is in the shape of half an octagon. The three Gothic double lancet windows are considered the most important architectural elements of the tower and the profiles; frames and mullions were restored in a simplified form, using many of the original stones. The tower is covered with a flat metal roof.

The Gothic Hall is connected to Stephen's Castle (István vár) on the western side. It was named after Prince Stephen, Duke of Slavonia, the younger brother of King Louis I of Hungary. Built in the 1340s–1370s, it is the oldest part of the medieval royal palace. Only the foundation and three interconnected barrel-vaulted rooms survive.

Stephen's Tower (István torony) was the keep of Stephen's Castle. However, it was destroyed by an explosion in 1686. The ground floor walls were discovered a little time after 1946. It was a square building (11.7 × 11.1 m), built upon the rock surface of Castle Hill. The walls are 2.31 to 2.7 m thick with narrow arrowslits on the southern, western and northern sides. The original doorway, on the eastern side, was walled up after the Gothic Hall was built in the 15th century.

Stephen's Tower was originally a free-standing structure, sited differently from later buildings. The triangle in front of it was walled up to create a continuous southern façade for the palace. During post-war reconstruction, this part of the façade (with a broken stone doorway) was not reconstructed. A vaulted room (6.2 × 6.3 m) on the ground floor was still intact in 1820, according to a contemporary drawing. Although the ribs, corbels and key stone were discovered during archeological research, the room was not reconstructed. A spiral stairway had connected the room with the missing higher floors.

The remaining part of the Stephen's Castle (with the barrel-vaulted rooms behind) has a simple stone façade with a Gothic doorway. The pointed arch was later restored.

== Interior ==
The interior from the time of Maria Theresa and Franz Joseph was mostly destroyed during World War II and the post-war reconstruction, excluding the Palatinal Crypt, which survived both. Little information exists about the interiors from the medieval and Baroque eras, but the palace built at the turn of the 20th century was meticulously recorded, using detailed descriptions, photographic documentation and grounds plans. Architect Alajos Hauszmann said about the royal apartments: "I created a 200 m [660 ft] long series of rooms, longer than any similar royal apartments in continental Europe except Versailles."

A series of rooms from the medieval castle were unearthed and reconstructed during the post-war rebuilding of Buda Castle in 1958–62. They are now part of the permanent exhibition of the Budapest History Museum in "Building E" of Buda Castle.

=== Medieval period ===
==== Architectural context ====
Only a fragment of the medieval castle survived the destruction of 1686–1715. The surviving rooms are not considered the most important ones; and none of the more famous rooms and buildings mentioned in the medieval sources exist today. The rooms which were unearthed after 1946 were only saved by chance and by their geographical position at a lower level than the newly created Baroque terrace. The Gothic Hall and the Palace Chapel were built by King Sigismund Luxemburg at the beginning of the 15th century. The castle wing is surrounded by a complex system of medieval fortifications.

==== Castle chapel ====
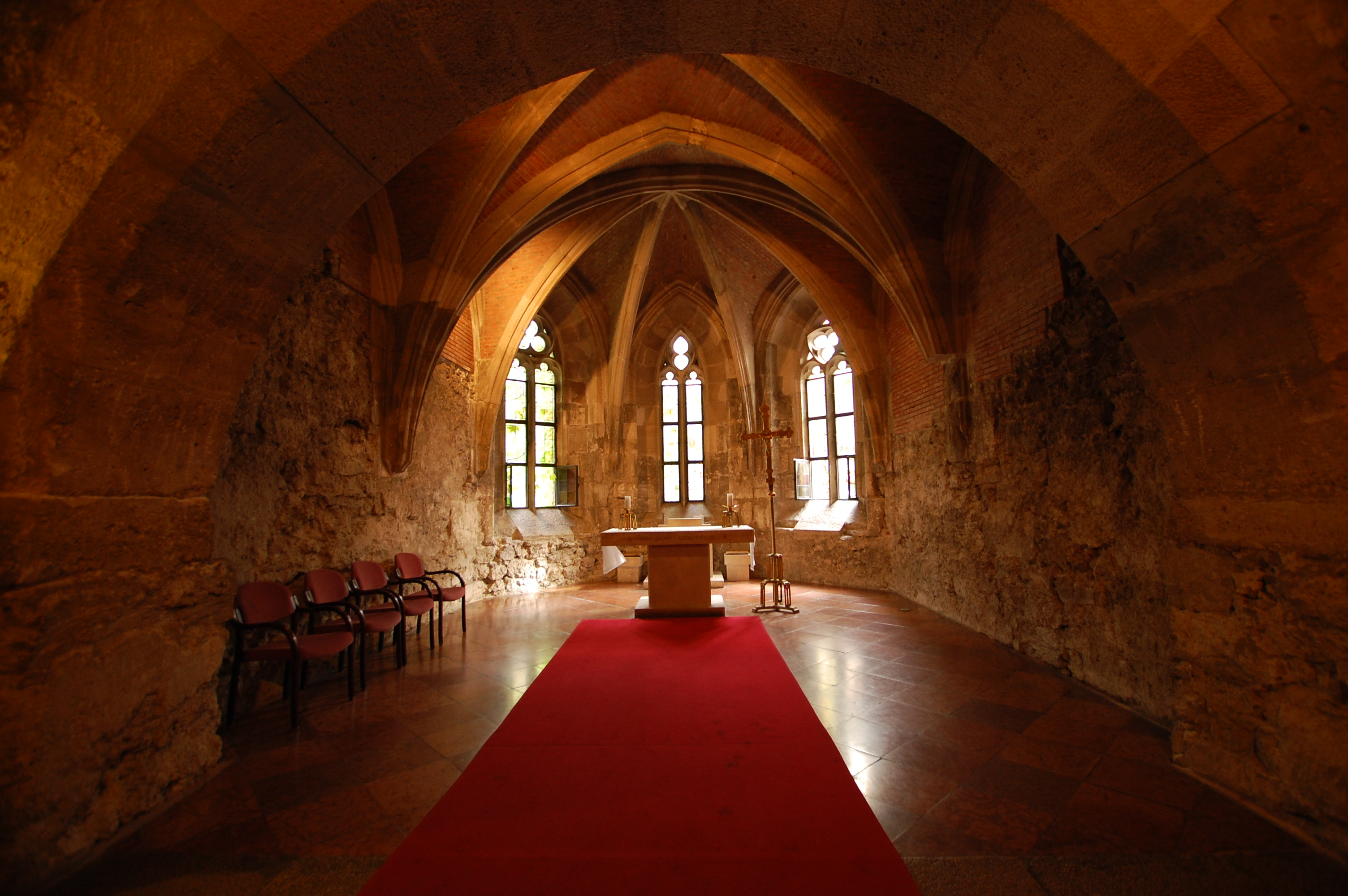
The lower chapel of the medieval castle

The first chapel in the castle was probably built in the 14th century during the reign of Louis I of Hungary. Eberhard Windecke claimed in his Chronicle that Charles II of Hungary was murdered in 1386 in a room from which the royal chapel could be seen. The chapel was again mentioned in the Chronicle of Lorenzo de Monacis, which was written around 1390.

King Sigismund of Luxemburg thoroughly rebuilt the old Anjou castle during the first decades of the 15th century. He erected a Gothic church in place of the former chapel. The Anjou castle's façade was now facing towards the inner palace courtyard, and the long chancel was projecting from the eastern side of the palace. The chancel was built upon a lower church due to a lack of space on the narrow plateau. The church had a 21-metre-long (69 ft) nave and an 11-metre-long (36 ft) chancel. The flamboyant Royal Church of Buda Castle was similar to the more famous Sainte-Chapelle in Paris.

Archeological research proved the date of the church, because 15th-century strata were discovered under the intact brick floor of the lower church.

In November 1489, Sultan Bayezid II of the Ottoman Empire sent the relics of John the Merciful to King Matthias Corvinus. The King placed the relics in the Royal Chapel, which was re-dedicated and embellished with Renaissance furniture. In 1526, Buda was plundered by the Ottoman Turks after the Battle of Mohács. The relics were rescued in time and carried to Pressburg, where they are still kept currently. A surviving church inventory from 1530 shows a wealth of furnishings. Later, King John Zápolya converted the lower church into a bastion. The large Gothic windows were walled up; and only the rectangular arrow slits were left open.

In 1541 the Ottoman Turks captured Buda without resistance, and the Royal Church ceased to be a place of Christian worship. The upper church was destroyed in the 1686 siege of Buda, and the ruins were demolished in 1715. The vault of the lower church collapsed, and the interior was filled with rubbish. The remains were then buried under the new Baroque terrace for two centuries.

The ruins of the lower church were discovered by archeologists in 1949–50. The remains were buried in 1953 because of conceptional disputes about the possible reconstruction. The chapel, finally reconstructed by 1963, was re-consecrated in 1990.

==== Gothic Hall ====
The Gothic Hall is one of the most important surviving examples of secular Gothic architecture in Central Europe. It was built by King Sigismund of Luxemburg in the early 15th century as an extension of the earlier Anjou palace. It was built on the southern edge of the natural rock plateau of Castle Hill. The level difference between the plateau and the southern court was about 2.79 metres (9.2 ft). A vaulted cellar was built under the hall to span this difference.

The Gothic Hall is an irregular rectangle of 20.2 × 11.55 m (66.3 × 37.9 ft), with a closed niche on the eastern side, which is the inside of the balcony tower. It is divided into two naves with Gothic rib vaults. The vaults are supported by two massive pillars which come up through the floor from the cellar beneath the room, and in addition, half-pillars in the corners support the ribs. All six vaults are quadripartite, and the two on the inner side are irregularly shaped.

The hall has four windows, two on the southern side and two on the eastern side, with stone benches in the window niches. The Hall was connected to the palace through a door in the northern wall, supposedly on the place of the original doorway. The northern section of the floor is three steps higher.

Buda Castle in the Middle Ages, from the Chronicles of Hartmann Schedel. The castle church, dedicated to St. John the Almoner, is indicated by the blue rectangle.

All the newly built side walls were plastered and painted white, while the original stone surfaces were left uncovered. The ribs, pillars, arches and window niches were restored by sculptor Ernő Szakál in 1961–62. The ribs have a simple profile, but fragments of a more complicated type were also found in the rubble, together with keystones. These pieces supposedly belonged to another stately hall situated above the room, but they were built into the reconstructed vaults by restorers in the 20th century.

The northern pillar of the Gothic Hall was already discovered by Alajos Hauszmann at the beginning of the 20th century. The remains were buried under the outbuildings of the Royal Gardens, and Hauszmann protected the medieval pillar by building a brick shaft around it.

==== Barrel-vaulted rooms ====
Three interconnected barrel-vaulted rooms belong to the oldest part of the palace, Stephen's Castle, which was built by Prince Stephen, Duke of Slavonia, in the 14th century. The northern room is larger (6.62 × 9.42 m or 21.7 × 30.9 ft) than the southern ones (5 × 4.55 m or 16.4 × 14.9 ft). The northern room is covered by an east–west axial vault while the southern rooms have north–south axial vaults.

The southern room is connected to the inner courtyard by a doorway. There is a small window high on the western wall. The middle room has a similar window. The larger northern room has three slit windows, one facing west and two facing north, all had iron rails. The rooms were connected to each other with carved Gothic corbel doors. The walls were originally plastered. In the southern room, a medieval stairway led to a trapdoor and a medieval toilet hidden in the empty space between the walls of the castle and the keep.

The barrel vaulted rooms were supposedly used as a prison in the Middle Ages. Later the southern vaults collapsed. The intact barrel vault of the northern room was broken by Alajos Hauszmann at the beginning of the 20th century when he filled the cellar with rubble. The barrel-vaulted rooms were restored in 1958–1962.

==== Albrecht Cellar ====
A medieval cellar north of the barrel-vaulted rooms, later called Albrecht pince (Albrecht Cellar), is covered with a Gothic brick barrel vault. The walls are blackened from burning. The cellar was probably built by King Sigismund of Luxemburg as the Cisterna Regia, i.e. the great underground cistern of the palace.

The Cisterna Regia was situated under the former northern zwinger of the palace. This small rectangular courtyard became a private royal garden during the reign of King Matthias Corvinus. The private garden was an early Renaissance giardino segreto (hidden garden). It was designed by architect Chimenti Camicia in the 1470s. A well in the middle of the garden was fed by the cistern underneath.

The hidden garden, the well and the cistern survived the 1686 siege of Buda. They were indicated on the plans of the area drawn by military architect Joseph de Haüy in 1687. In 1715–1724 the former Cisterna Regia became the cellar of the new Baroque palace. A section of this room was later used as an ice chamber.

==== King's Cellar ====
The King's Cellar (Király pince) is not a medieval structure, but a Baroque-era brick cellar under the Danube side of Building E. It was filled with tons of earth and rubble, and the original eastern façade of the medieval royal palace survived under the fill. The inner walls of the Baroque palace were actually built upon the old façade. Only the 7-metre-high (23 ft) basement section of the original façade remained.

This wing was built by King Sigismund of Luxemburg in the early 15th century and was rebuilt by King Matthias Corvinus 50 years later. The surviving eastern façade was built from large, finely carved blocks of stone. It followed the contour of Castle Hill with a break in the middle. A buttress was added and a rectangular tower with two buttresses on its corners. The lower part of a balcony on the tower was reconstructed, with three elegant Gothic corbels decorated with cusps.

It was not possible to demolish the King's Cellar because the whole Baroque palace was resting upon it; the inner fill was removed in 1961. The medieval façade was reconstructed inside the cellar space between 1961 and 1965. Large windows were cut in the outer wall of the cellar to let in the daylight. Currently, the architectural history of the palace is discernible by viewing the interwoven layers of the past.

On 25 July 2007 Prime Minister Ferenc Gyurcsány chose the King's Cellar as the place to announce the list of the "most important public works projects", financed by European Union funds between 2007 and 2013.

=== Baroque and Historicism ===
==== Old ceremonial rooms ====
The old ceremonial rooms were as follows:

===== "Zenta" Room =====
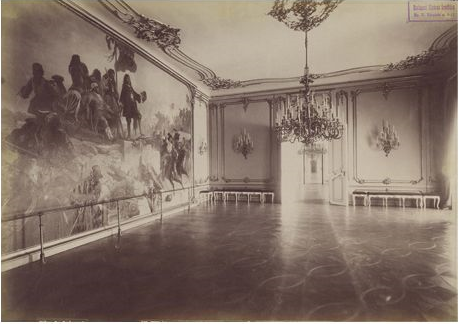
The Zenta Room

The "Zenta" Room ("Zenta" előterem) was on the first floor of the Baroque wing, was situated next to the audience antechamber. It opened from the main staircase of the central wing and was the first room of the ceremonial apartments on that side. In the early 1900s, it had a white-golden stucco decoration with one chandelier. The name of the chamber referred to the large painting of the Battle of Zenta contained therein.

===== Audience Antechamber =====
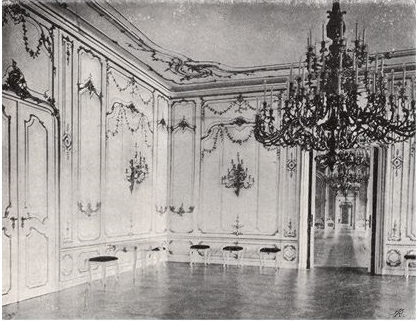
The Audience Antechamber

The Audience Antechamber (Fogadási váróterem) was situated north of the ballroom on the first floor of the Baroque wing. In the Baroque era it was called Antichambre Ihrer Majestät der Kaiserin ("Antechamber of HM The Empress"). The room gave access to Maria Theresa's private apartments from the ballroom. In the early 1900s, the audience antechamber became part of the ceremonial apartments and had the same white-golden Rococo stucco decoration as the white antechamber on the other side.

===== Grand Throne Room =====
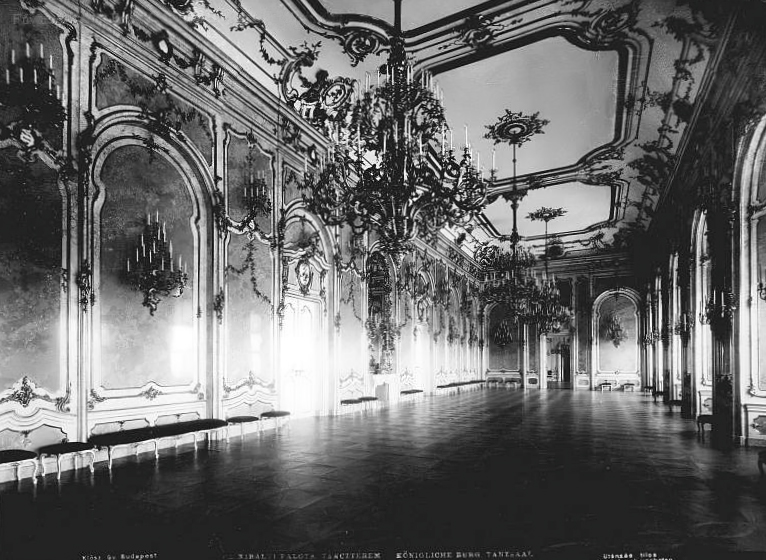
The Grand Throne Room (c. 1894)

The Grand Throne Room (Nagy trónterem), formerly known as the ballroom (Nagyterem), on the first floor of the Baroque wing had several layers of Baroque decoration from the second half of the 18th and the 19th century. Two surviving drawings record the oldest form of the room. Jakob Schmutzer's drawing from 1777 shows the opening ceremony of the Eötvös Loránd University after it was moved to the palace. The room had a Late Baroque decoration with double grooved Corinthian pilasters between the windows and stucco garlands. The walls were decorated with Vinzenz Fischer's frescoes of the four faculties. József Pollencig's drawing from 1795 shows a ball scene in the "Prunksaal". The pilasters were kept, but the frescoes were already covered, and the whole room was stuccoed. On the vault the coat-of-arms of the Kingdom of Hungary can be seen. After the destruction of the 1849 siege, the room was redecorated in Neo-Baroque style. In 1892 the old ballroom was rebuilt with a new ceiling and a gallery towards the Lions Court; three of its side walls were preserved. It was enlarged again after 1896. The function of the ballroom was given to another new hall and this room was converted into the main throne hall instead. In the early 1900s, the room had a Rococo white-golden stucco decoration with three large chandeliers.

Vinzenz Fischer's frescoes were re-discovered in 1953 during the post-war reconstruction. In spite of this, all the decoration layers were destroyed. Today it houses the Gothic altar collection of the Hungarian National Gallery.

===== White Antechamber =====
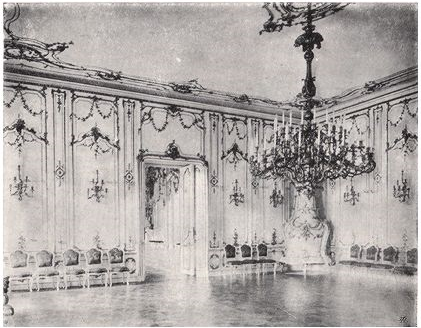
The White Antechamber

The White Antechamber (Fehér előterem) is on the first floor of the Baroque wing and was situated south of the throne room. In the Baroque era it was called Zweytes Antichambre ("second antechamber"). In the early 1900s it had a Rococo white-golden stucco decoration with one chandelier and a white Rococo stove.

===== "Coronation" Room =====
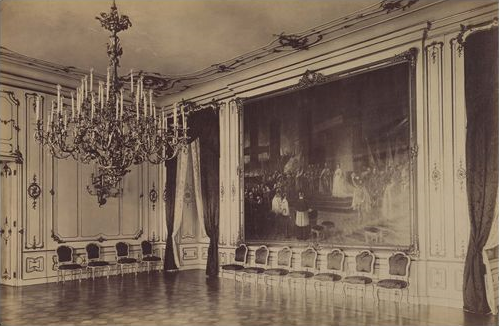
The Coronation Room

The "Coronation" Room ("Koronázás" előterem), also on the first floor of the Baroque wing, was situated next to the white antechamber. It opened from the main staircase of the southern wing and was the first room of the ceremonial apartments on that side. In the early 1900s it had a white-golden stucco decoration with one chandelier. The name of the chamber referred to the painting of Franz Joseph I's coronation as King of Hungary after the Austro-Hungarian Compromise of 1867.

==== Old royal apartments ====
The old royal apartments are as follows:

===== Small Throne Room =====
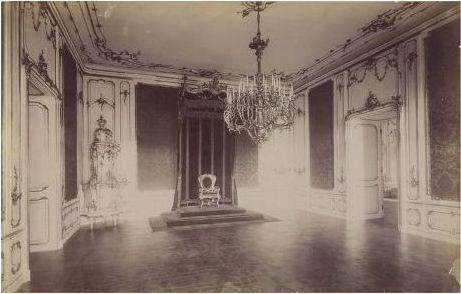
The Small Throne Room

The Small Throne Room (Kis trónterem), which was situated next to the Audience Antechamber on the first floor of the Baroque wing. In the Baroque era it was called Audienz-Zimmer and was part of the Empress' private apartments. In Hauszmann's time it was converted into the throne room of the palace, with a simple Baroque throne under a baldachin. It had a white-golden stucco decoration with one chandelier and a Rococo cocklestove.

===== "Circle" Tearoom =====
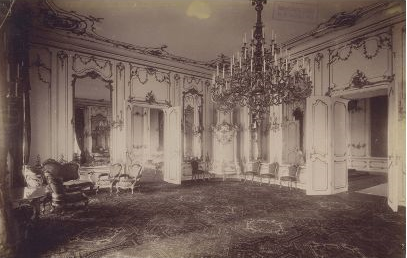
The "Circle" Tearoom

The "Circle" Tearoom ("Circle" teaszalon) was on the first floor of the Baroque wing and situated next to the small throne room, in the corner of the southern wing. In the Baroque era it was called Gesellschaft Zimmer Ihrer Majestät der Kaiserin ("Parlour of HM The Empress") and was part of Maria Theresa's private apartments. In the early 1900s, it had a white-golden stucco decoration with one chandelier and a Rococo cocklestove. The furniture consisted of a Rococo parlour suite.

===== Antechamber =====
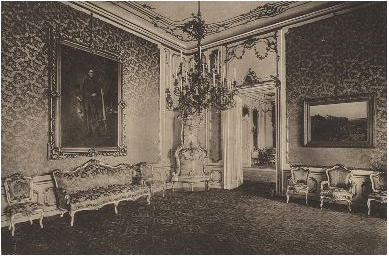
Antechamber, former dressing room of the Queen

The Antechamber was on the first floor of the Baroque wing and was situated next to the "circle" tearoom with two windows opening on to the Danube. In the Baroque era it was called Ankleide-Zimmer Ihrer Majestät der Kaiserin ("Dressing Chamber of HM The Empress") and was part of Maria Theresa's private apartments. It was connected to another small room, the Frauen Kammer. In Hauszmann's time the walls were largely clad with wallpaper. The furniture consisted of a Rococo cocklestove, chairs and paintings. The last small room of the Empress, the former Schreib cabinet ("writing room"), with one window opening on to the Danube, later became a simple passageway.

===== Smoking Room =====
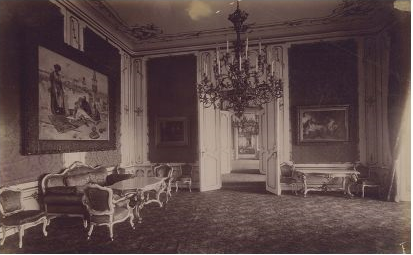
The Smoking Salon, former bedchamber of Queen Maria Theresa

The Smoking Room (Dohányzó szalon) was on the first floor of the Baroque wing and was situated in the middle of the Danube side of the old palace. In the Baroque era it was called Schlafzimmer Ihrer k.k. Majestäten ("Bedchamber of Their Imperial and Royal Majesties"). It was the only common room of Empress Maria Theresa and her husband, Francis I. In the early 1900s, the walls were largely hung with wallpaper. The furniture consisted of a Rococo parlour suite and paintings. In the old imperial apartments only the ceilings had the typically white-golden stucco decoration, used in the old ceremonial apartments.

===== Writing Room =====
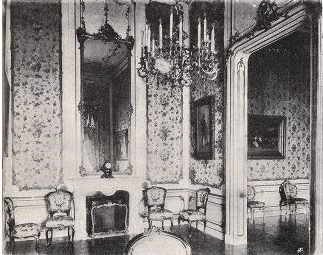
The Writing Room

The Writing Room (Írószoba) was on the first floor of the Baroque wing, was formerly part of the private apartments of Francis I. One window opened to the Danube. In the Baroque era it was called Ankleidecabinet S.M. des Kaisers ("Dressing Chamber of HM The Emperor"). It was connected to another small room, the second dressing room. Later, the imperial dressing room was divided with a wall; with half being converted into a simple passageway, the other into a small writing room. In the early 1900s the latter's walls were largely clad with a very ornate Rococo wallpaper. It had a white marble mantelpiece with a large Rococo mirror above.

===== Parlour =====
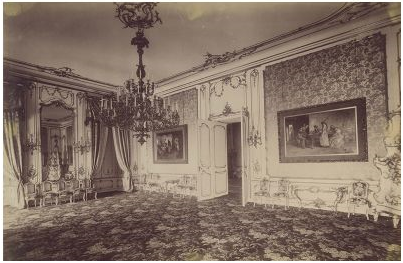
The Parlour

The Parlour (Társalkodó terem), on the first floor of the Baroque wing, was part of the private apartments of Francis I. It was situated in the corner of the southern wing with 2+3 windows opening on to the Danube. In the Baroque era the room was divided with a wall, one half named Empfangs Zimmer S.M. des Kaisers ("Reception Chamber of HM The Emperor"), the other Arbeits Cabinet ("Study"). In Hauszmann's time, it was converted to a great parlour with wallpaper clad walls, a Rococo cocklestove, a chandelier, paintings, chairs and a mirror.

===== Antechamber =====
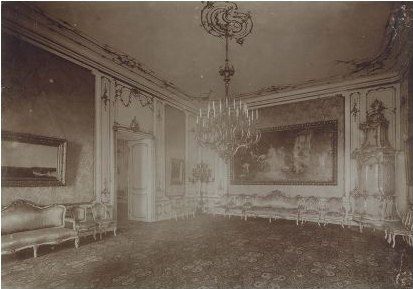
Antechamber

The Antechamber, on the first floor of the Baroque wing, was the last room of the former private apartments of Francis I. In the Baroque era it was called Zweytes Audienz Zimmer ("second audience room"). In Hauszmann's time the walls were mainly clad with wallpaper, and it had a Rococo cocklestove, a chandelier, paintings and chairs.

==== South Wing ====
The rooms of the south wing are as follows:

===== Baroque Court =====
The Baroque Court (Barokk udvar), a rectangular court, which is the oldest part of the Baroque palace. Here the original 18–19th century façades survived, and in 1997 the court was covered with a glass roof and became the main exhibition hall of the Budapest History Museum.

===== King's Staircase =====
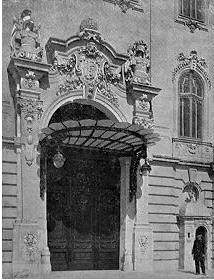
Entrance to the King's Staircase

The King's Staircase (Király-lépcső), the Baroque main staircase of the southern wing gave access to the private apartments of Emperor Francis I. Both the King's Staircase and its northern twin, the Diplomat's Staircase, had ornate gates opening onto Lions Court, decorated with telamons. The kitchens were originally situated on the ground floor of the southern wing, but they were relocated by Hauszmann.

==== Central Wing ====
The central wing had the following rooms:

===== Diplomat's Staircase =====
The Diplomat's Staircase (Diplomata-lépcső) was the Baroque main staircase of the central (originally northern) wing and gave access to the private apartments of Maria Theresa. In the 18th century there was an officer's dining room and a smaller kitchen on the ground floor and another dining room with a cafe kitchen on the first floor. The southern and northern (later central) wings had the same ground plan: all the rooms opened from a passageway running along the sides of a rectangular central court. The two monumental stairways were rebuilt by Hauszmann in Neo-Baroque style.

===== St Stephen's Chapel =====
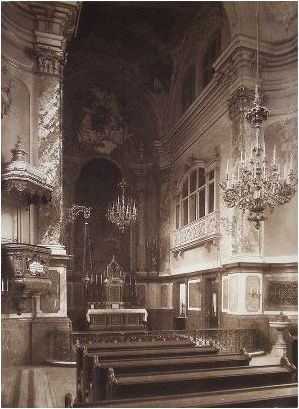
St Stephen's Chapel

St Stephen's Chapel, known before as St. Sigismund Chapel, or Castle Church (Szent Zsigmond-kápolna, Vártemplom) was the chapel royal in the western end of this wing, which had no façades, only a door opening onto Lions Court (through an antechamber). Construction was finished in 1768 and the church was consecrated in 1769. The ground plan was drawn by Nicolò Pacassi, with the interior was designed by his follower, Franz Anton Hillebrandt. The ground plan followed a typical "violin" form favoured in the Baroque church architecture of Central Europe at that time. It had a rectangular chancel and a nave with four bays for side altars. On the first and the second floors two oratories opened into the chancel and a two-storey high gallery was situated above the entrance. In 1777–78 a new door was opened in the first side bay to give access to the new chapel of the Holy Right. An engraving from 1771 to 1780 shows the original interior design in its completed form: double pilasters, windows with segmental arches, stucco and false marble decoration, double oratory windows and a doorway with a stucco veil drawn aside by flying putti. The church was slightly rebuilt by Hauszmann, who demolished the Chapel of the Holy Right in 1899 and built a new chapel for the relic behind the chancel (converting a small recess). This chapel was decorated with the golden Venetian mosaics of Károly Lotz. A new Neo-Baroque main altar was built in the church in 1899.

20th-century photos testify that the church survived in its Baroque form until the war. During a siege, the vaults of the church partially collapsed and the furniture was plundered. The Castle Church was left decaying for more than a decade. In 1957 the remaining two vaults collapsed, and the church was totally destroyed and converted to exhibition spaces. The altar table was rescued and re-erected in Pilisvörösvár in 1957. The Lotz mosaics from the Chapel of the Holy Right were also rescued and re-assembled in Balatonalmádi.

===== Palatinal Crypt =====
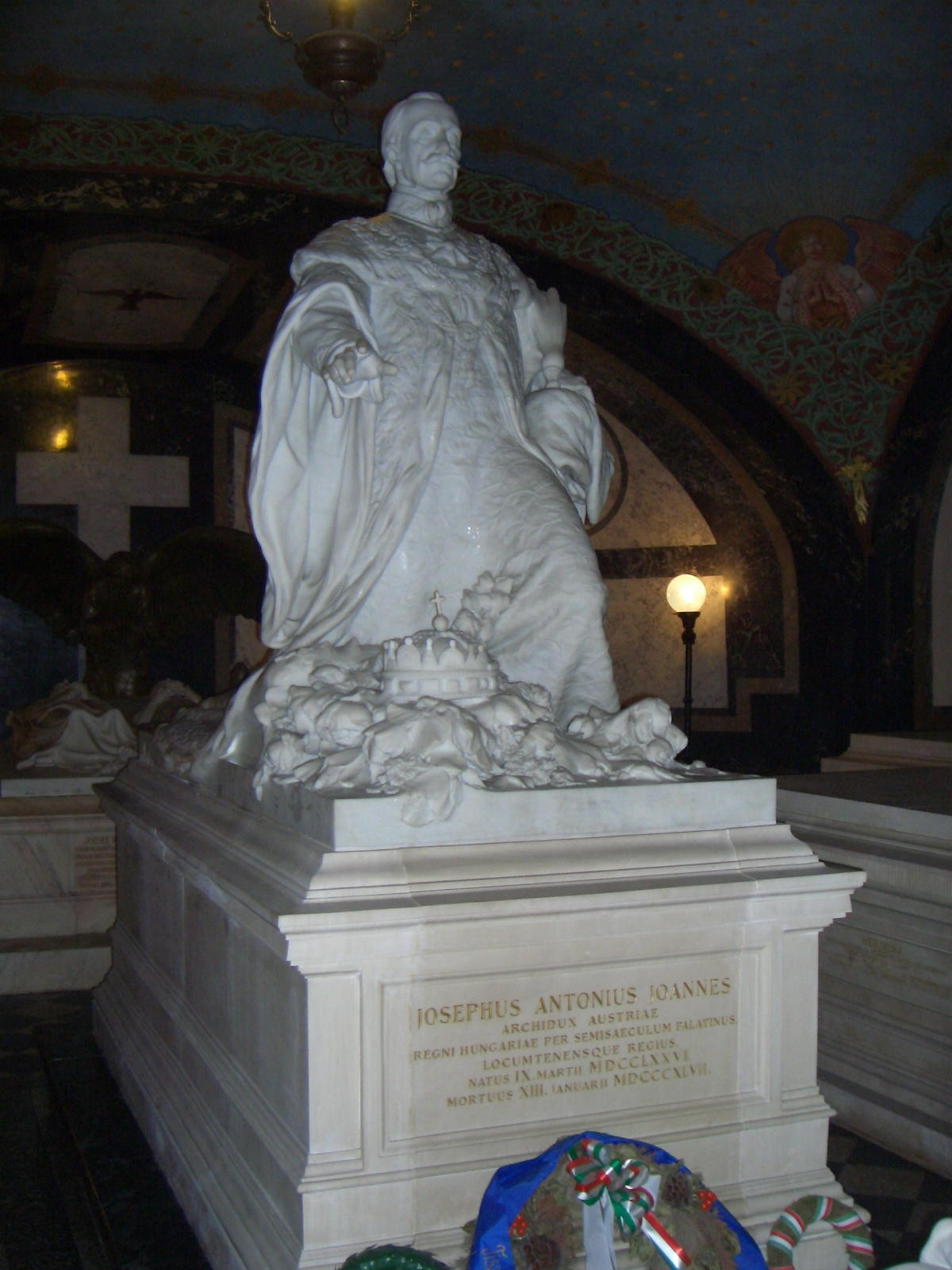
Tomb of Archduke Joseph, Palatine of Hungary in the Palatinal Crypt

The Palatinal Crypt (Nádori kripta) was under the former palace chapel and is the only surviving room of the whole Royal Castle. The underground crypt was first used as a burial place between 1770 and 1777. In August 1820, Elisabeth Karoline, Palatine Joseph's infant daughter was buried in the crypt. Seventeen years later, the Palatine's 13-year-old son Alexander Leopold followed. Palatine Joseph decided to convert the crypt into a family mausoleum and commissioned Franz Hüppmann with the task. The work was finished in 1838, and other members of the Palatine's family were reburied here. Palatine Joseph himself was interred on 13 January 1847. The crypt was continuously used by the Hungarian branch of the Habsburg family. It was repeatedly restored and enriched with new works of art, frescoes, statues and ornate stone sarcophagi, made by renowned artists of the 19th century. The last member of the family buried there was Archduchess Clotilde in 1927. The crypt survived the war unscathed and was spared during the post-war reconstruction.

The crypt was looted in 1966 and 1973 (during the construction works), when some corpses were thrown out of the sarcophagi by the thieves. The human remains were later identified and reburied. The crypt was restored in 1985–1987. Since then the Palatinal Crypt is part of the exhibition of the Hungarian National Gallery.

==== North Wing ====
===== Lobby =====
The main lobby (Előcsarnok) of the Royal Palace was situated in Hauszmann's Northern Wing on the Danube side. It was a long, rectangular hall divided into four sections with free standing Ionic columns and two square pillars. The section at the southern end was elevated a few steps. Nine arched windows opened towards the Danube. In the middle of the other sidewall, a doorway led to the inner courtyard. The walls and the ceiling were stuccoed. The southern elevation was closed off with a stone balustrade between the pillars and the wall. The ornate lobby was designed for important state ceremonies.

===== Grand Ballroom =====
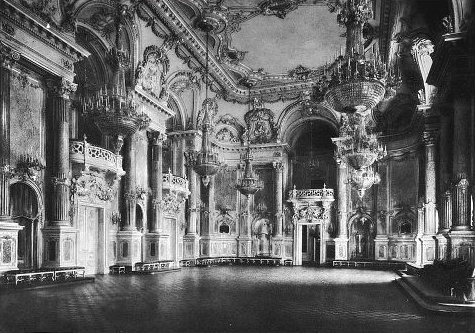
The Grand Ballroom

The Grand Ballroom (Nagy bálterem), in the middle part of the northern wing, took over the function of the smaller old ballroom in the Baroque wing. Designed by Hauszmann, it was the most splendid room of the palace. The two-storey high, airy room was lavishly decorated with stuccoes, half columns, trabeation, balconies and six crystal chandeliers in Neo-Baroque style. Seven arched windows and doorways opened towards a pillared terrace facing the western forecourt. On the other side, the ballroom was connected to the Buffet Hall through three doors.

Photos made after the war show the room with its vaulted ceiling collapsed. The ballroom was not restored but totally destroyed in the course of the post-war remodelling.

===== Dining Hall =====
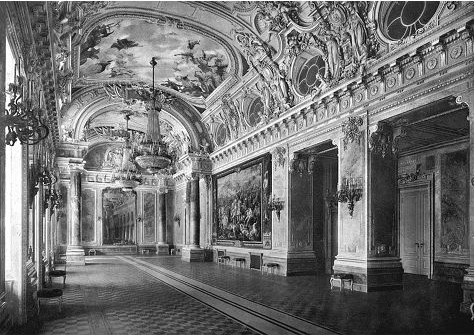
The Dining Hall

The Dining Hall (Buffet-csarnok), on the Danube side of the northern wing, was a very long hall used for state banquets. It was connected to the Great Ballroom nearby and it was possible to join them together. There was a shorter, passage-like space between the two rooms. This passage was separated from the Buffet Hall by six square pillars, while its other side was a solid wall with three doors. On the eastern side of the Buffet Hall a long row of windows opened towards the Danube and a pillared terrace. The Buffet Hall was divided into three sections with free-standing Ionic columns, holding trabeations. The vaulted ceiling was lavishly decorated with frescoes and stuccoes.

===== Habsburg Hall =====
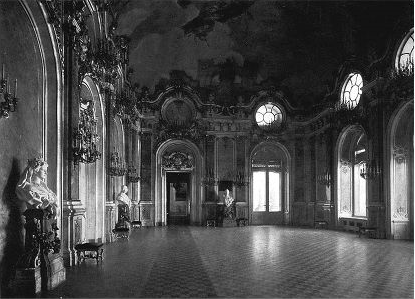
The Habsburg Hall

The Habsburg Hall (Habsburg terem) was situated in the middle of the long palace complex, under Hauszmann's (false) dome, where the new northern wing and the old palace met. Although this part of the building belonged to the original palace, it was thoroughly rebuilt by Hauszmann–this stately room was totally his own work. It was one of the three historical rooms of the palace representing the important periods of Hungarian history. A free-standing, double flight of steps, called the Habsburg Steps, connected the room with the Royal Gardens on the Danube terrace. The room had lavish Baroque decorations with half-pillars and gilded stuccoes. The vaulted ceiling was decorated with Károly Lotz's fresco Apotheosis of the Habsburg Dynasty. Károly Senyei's four Carrara marble busts stood in front of the sidewalls representing King Charles III, Queen Maria Theresa, King Franz Joseph and Queen Elisabeth.

The Habsburg Hall survived World War II relatively undamaged, but in the 1950s it was demolished for political reasons.

==== Krisztinaváros wing ====
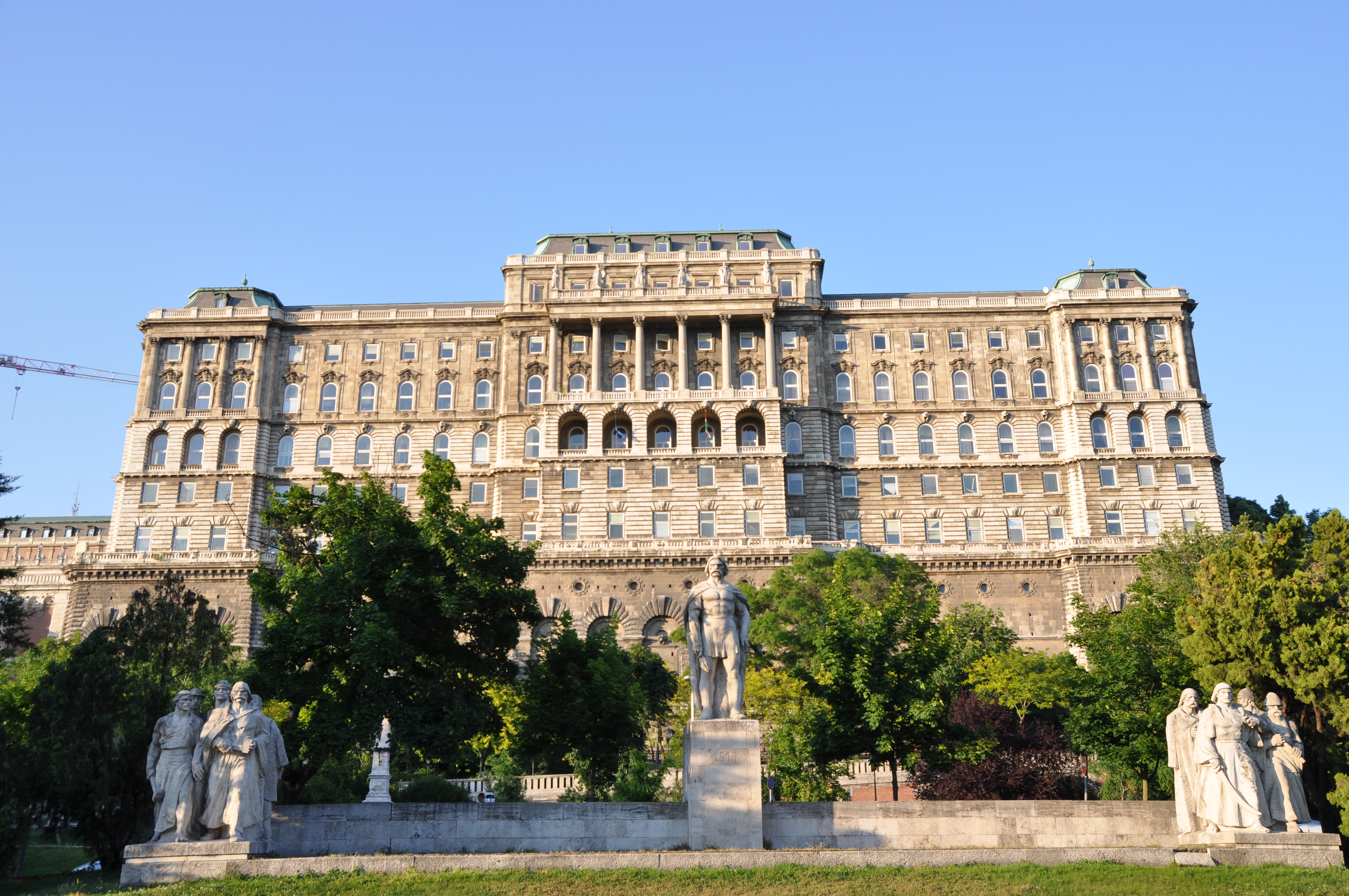
Wing facing the district of Krisztinaváros

The Krisztinaváros wing faces the district of Krisztinaváros, which was named in honour of the daughter of Queen Maria Theresa, Archduchess Maria Christina, Duchess of Teschen.

===== Entrance hall =====
The entrance hall (Előcsarnok) opened from Lions Court, under an arcaded Neo-Renaissance portico, through ornate wrought-iron doors. This now serves as the entrance of the Hungarian National Library. The hall was a long, oblong-shaped room with 4+4 free standing Ionic columns in front of the walls on the longer sides, holding a trabeation. In the end of the shorter sides two doors opened into antechambers. The three arcaded doorways on the longer side opened into a lobby. The ceiling of the hallway was stuccoed, and the whole design was Italian Renaissance in style.

===== Lobby =====
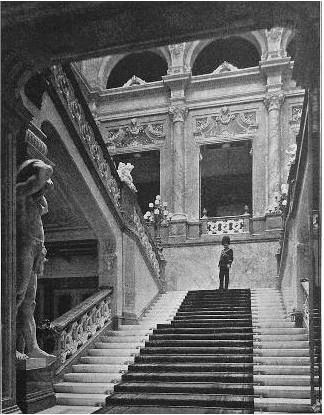
The Grand Staircase

The lobby (Előcsarnok) was connected to the hall of the main staircase through pillars. The stuccoed ceiling was held up by two rectangular pillars. The apartments of Archduke Joseph August of Austria and his wife, Archduchess Augusta, were situated on the ground floor of the Krisztinaváros wing and opened from this room. Now it serves as the lobby of the Hungarian National Library in a radically modernised form.

===== Main Staircase =====
The monumental main staircase (Főlépcsőház), with three flights, led up from the lobby to the first floor in an airy, glass-roofed hall. The side walls of the hall were decorated in Italian Renaissance style with colossal Corinthian half-columns, stuccoes and lunette openings. Ornate wrought-iron chandeliers and intricate balustrades decorated the stairs. On the ground floor, colossal Atlas statues stood beside the side pillars, holding the weight of the upper flights. The marble statues were the works of János Fadrusz from 1897. During the post-war reconstruction the main staircase was radically modernised. Only the two colossal Atlas statues survived. Now they are standing somewhat incongruently near their original places.

===== St Stephen's Hall =====
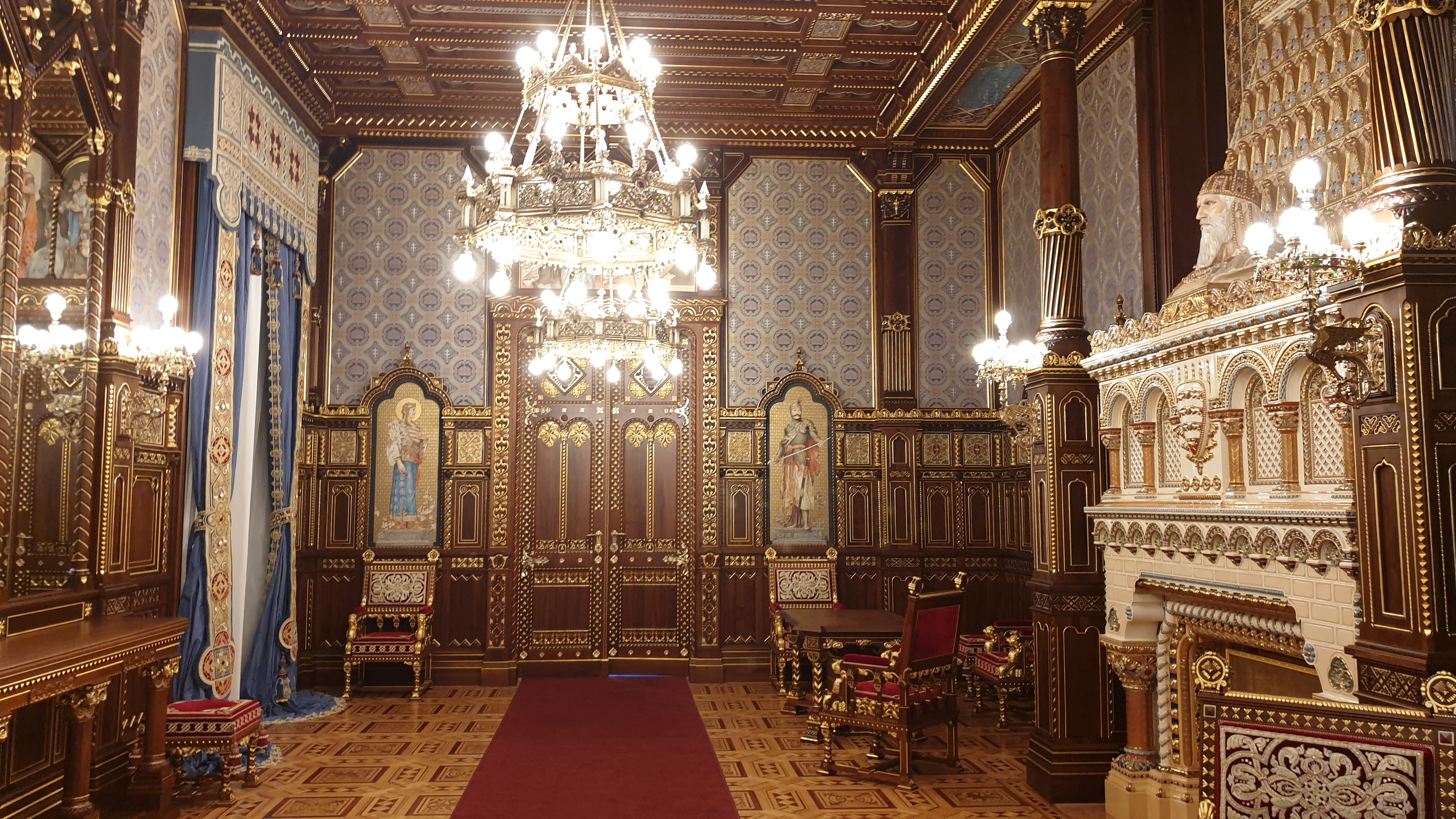
St Stephen's Room

St Stephen's Hall ("Szent István" terem), on the first floor of the Krisztinaváros wing, was one of the "historical rooms" of the palace, created by Hauszmann. Together with the Matthias Room and the Habsburg Room, they represented the three most important periods of Hungarian history. Saint Stephen's Hall connected the new Private Royal Apartments and—through a very long passageway—the Old Royal Apartments in the Danube Wing. Its style evoked the age of the Árpáds, the first Hungarian dynasty in the early Middle Ages. The walls were clad with dark carved wood paneling. The most spectacular item was a large stone mantelpiece with Romanesque Revival architectural details and the bust of King Saint Stephen, the first king of Hungary. The room was furnished with medieval-looking metal chandeliers and heavy wooden furniture. It was completely destroyed in World War II.

In 2016 however, the reconstruction of St Stephen's Hall (as the first step towards the eventual reconstruction of the entire castle) was announced. After years of meticulous research and work, the room was accurately restored and it was opened to public on 20 August 2021.

===== Matthias Room =====
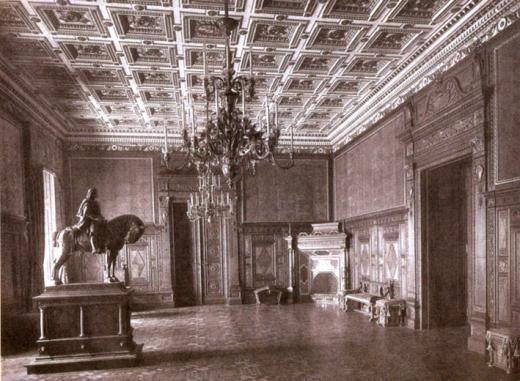
Matthias Room

Matthias Room (Mátyás terem) was named after King Matthias Corvinus, who ruled in the late Middle Ages. It was one of the three "historical rooms" of the palace, created by Hauszmann. The room opened from the Royal Bedroom, at the end of the line of private apartments. It had three windows opening towards the hills of Buda. There was a long terrace in front of the room. The style of the Matthias Room was Renaissance, with carved wooden paneling and a coffered ceiling. It was furnished with a mantelpiece in the corner and two chandeliers, the most spectacular item being the equestrian statue of King Matthias, sculpted by János Fadrusz. The statue was a miniature copy of the original standing on the main square of Kolozsvár (now Cluj-Napoca). This copy was saved after the war and put on display in the Hungarian National Gallery.

===== Strong Room =====
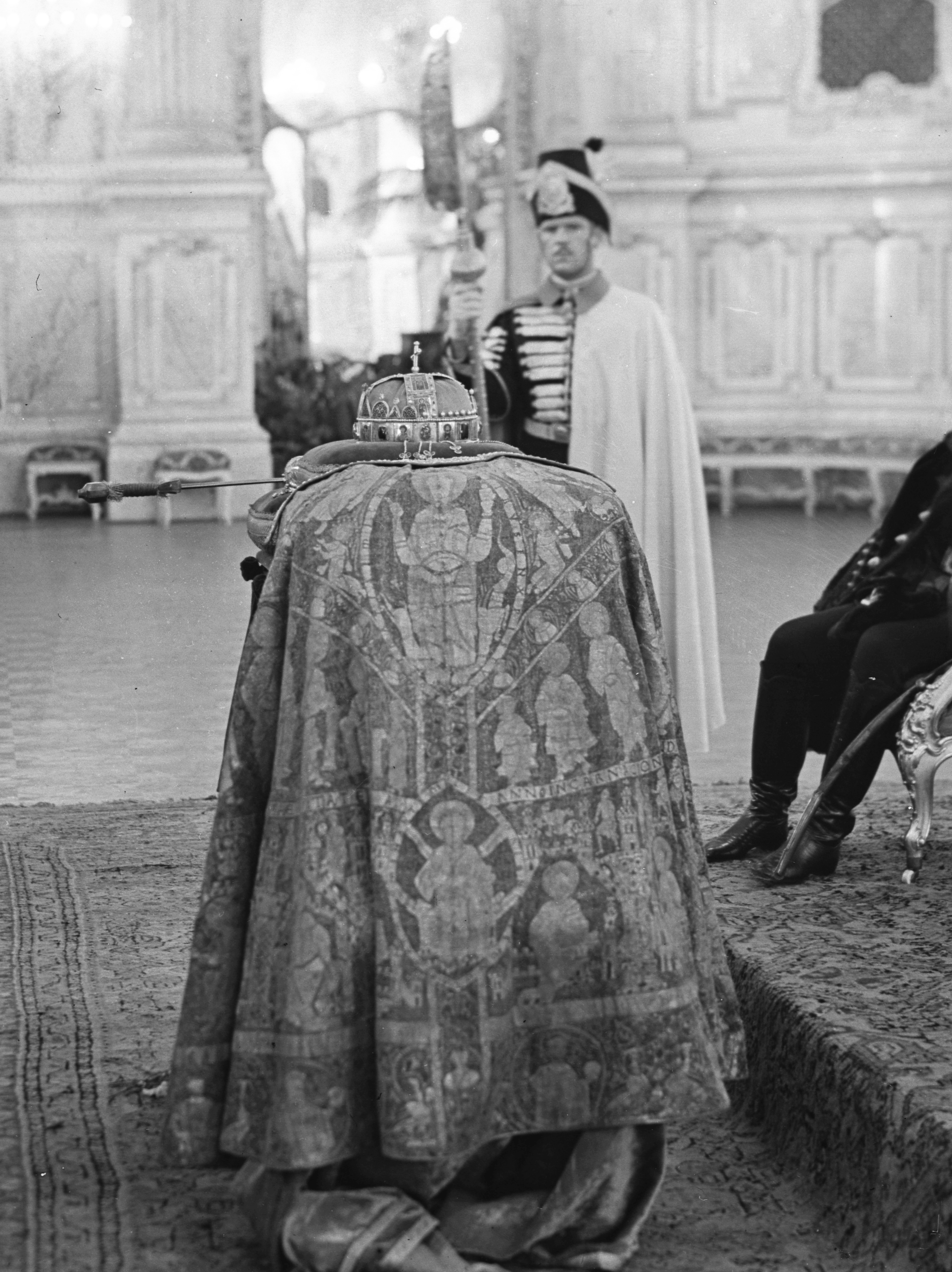
Hungarian Crown on display at the Strong Room

The Hungarian crown jewels were kept in the specially designed Strong Room (Páncélterem) on the second floor of the Krisztinaváros Wing. The Crown of Saint Stephen was kept here between 1900 and 1944.

===== Queen Elisabeth Memorial Museum =====
The small Queen Elisabeth Memorial Museum (Erzsébet Királyné Emlékmúzeum) on the second floor of the Krisztinaváros Wing was established in remembrance of Queen Elisabeth after her murder in 1898. Memorabilia were collected by Ida Ferenczy, Elisabeth's former lady-in-waiting, Viscountess Pallavicini and Countess Ilona Batthyány. The museum opened on 15 January 1908 as an affiliate of the Hungarian National Museum. The collection contained personal items, letters and clothes. Its most important relic was the costume that Elisabeth had been wearing when she was murdered. One room was meticulously recreated as the Queen's own writing room with her original writing desk and her 219 Hungarian books. The museum was badly damaged during World War II, and the surviving relics were bestowed to other museums.

==== Private royal apartments ====
===== Royal Entrance Hall =====
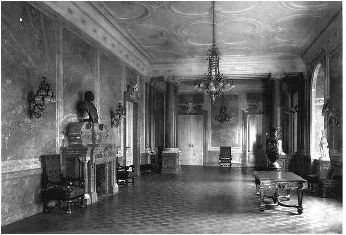
The Entrance Hall

The Royal Entrance Hall (Fejedelmi előterem), on the first floor of the Krisztinaváros Wing, gave access to the rooms of the Private Royal Apartments of King Franz Joseph I. The private apartments were situated in the southwestern part of the Krisztinaváros wing, their windows opening towards the hills of Buda. The Royal Entrance Hall was connected through a wide passageway to the main staircase hall. The spacious, oblong-shaped hall was divided in three, with two pairs of Ionic marble columns supporting architraves. The central part of the room was much longer than the bays at the ends. Doors connected the hall with the rooms of the private apartments. In the middle of the longer wall stood an ornate stone mantelpiece with the bust of Franz Joseph. On the other side, three windows opened to the inner courtyard of the Krisztinaváros wing. The ceiling was stuccoed and the side walls of the hall were covered with marble.

===== Antechamber =====
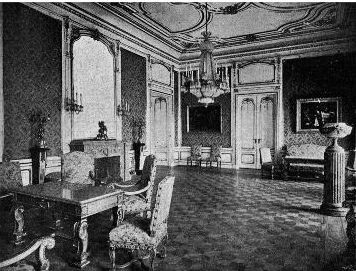
Antechamber

The antechamber (Előterem) of the private apartments opened from the Royal Entrance Hall. It had three windows facing toward the hills. The room had a typical Biedermeier white-golden stucco decoration with floral wallpapers, resembling to the cosy rooms of Schönbrunn Palace. All the rooms of the private apartments followed this Viennese style favoured by the King. The antechamber was furnished with a stone mantelpiece (with a mirror above), an Empire crystal chandelier, a stone flowerpot standing on a fluted column and Neo-Renaissance table with chairs.

===== Audience Room =====
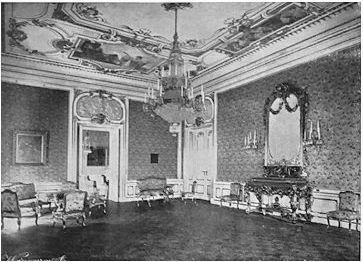
The Audience Room

The audience room (Fogadószoba) of Franz Joseph I was situated in a corner of the private apartments wing, with two windows opening southwards and three windows opening westwards. It had a beautiful stuccoed and frescoed ceiling. The walls were covered with floral wallpapers. The room was furnished with a crystal chandelier, a golden Rococo console table with a large mirror and a parlour suite.

===== Writing Room =====
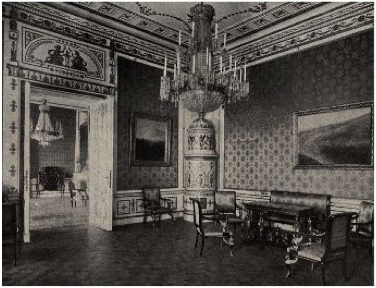
Writing room in the royal suite

The writing room (Írószoba) of Franz Joseph had two windows opening towards the hills of Buda. It had a white-golden stuccoed ceiling and the walls were covered with floral wallpapers. The room was furnished with a crystal chandelier, an ornate white cocklestove, a table and chairs. To the right and left two similar parlours opened from the room.

===== Royal Bedroom =====
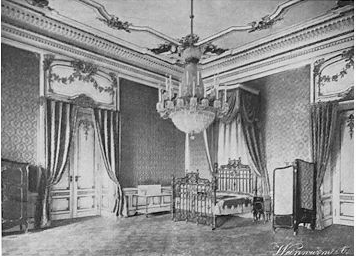
Bedroom of the king

The bedroom (Fejedelmi hálószoba) of the king had two windows opening towards the hills of Buda. It had a white-golden stuccoed ceiling and the walls were covered with floral wallpapers. The room was furnished with a crystal chandelier, the baldachined royal bed and a folding screen. The bedroom was connected to a dressing room, a private bathroom and smaller rooms belonging to the butler and the servants.

===== Royal Dining Hall =====
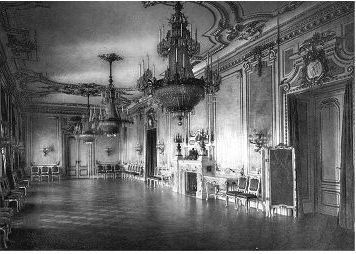
The Dining Room

The Royal Dining Hall (Fejedelmi ebédlő) opened from the Royal Entrance Hall, and it was the largest room of the private apartments. The long hall had six windows opening towards Gellért Hill. Three crystal chandeliers gave light to the elegant stuccoed space. In the middle of the longer side wall, between the two doors, stood a marble mantelpiece.

===== "Circle" Room =====
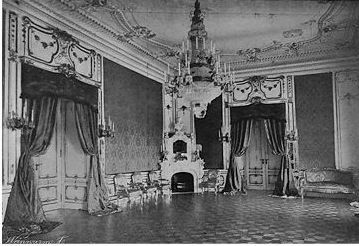
The "Circle" Room

The "Circle" Room ("Circle" terem) opened from the Royal Dining Hall. It was the last room of the private apartments on the southern side, with three windows opening towards Gellért Hill. It had a white-golden stuccoed ceiling and the walls were covered with floral wallpapers. The room was furnished with a crystal chandelier, an ornate white cocklestove and chairs.

===== Dining Room =====
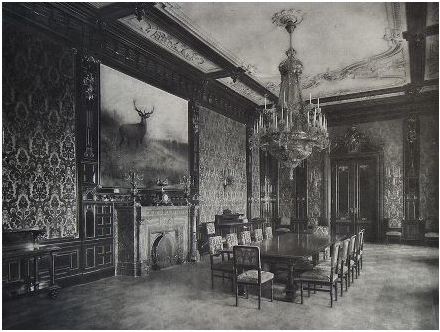
The Dining Room in the royal guest suite

The small dining room (Ebédlő) was situated in the northern part of the Krisztinaváros wing, among the other rooms of the Royal Guest Suite. Four windows opened towards Krisztinaváros. The ceiling was stuccoed, while the walls were covered with carved wooden panelling and wallpaper. A stone mantelpiece and large painting above it (depicting a hunting scene with a deer) gave a homey feeling to the room. It was furnished with a crystal chandelier and a long dining table with 12 chairs.

==== Archducal Apartments ====
These apartments, on the ground floor of the Krisztinaváros Wing, were designed in 1902 for Archduke Joseph August of Austria (1872–1962), the head of the Hungarian branch of the Habsburgs and his wife, Archduchess Augusta (1875–1964). They could be reached from the lobby of the Krisztinaváros wing through a long passageway. The most important rooms were (in due course): the salon, where guests were entertained; the great parlour; parlour; dining room; the Archduke's study; the Archduke's bedroom; the Archduchess' bedroom; the Archduchess' study; and the breakfast parlour. All rooms had a relatively simple decoration with white stuccoed ceilings and stucco panels above the doorways. The walls were covered with wallpaper. Crystal chandeliers, stone mantelpieces and typical turn-of-the-century furniture gave the rooms a homey ambiance. The great parlour was decorated with large paintings.

== Works of art ==
The castle and its gardens have been decorated with works of art since their foundation in the 14th century. Only written sources speak about the most important medieval works, but detailed pictorial and written information exists about the 19th-century artistic decoration of the palace, which was mainly created by the most important Hungarian artists of the era. Many of the statues survived the destruction during the siege of Budapest in 1944–45 and were later restored. On the other hand, important works of art were destroyed during the controversial reconstruction of the castle during the 1950s and 1960s.

=== Sculptural monuments ===
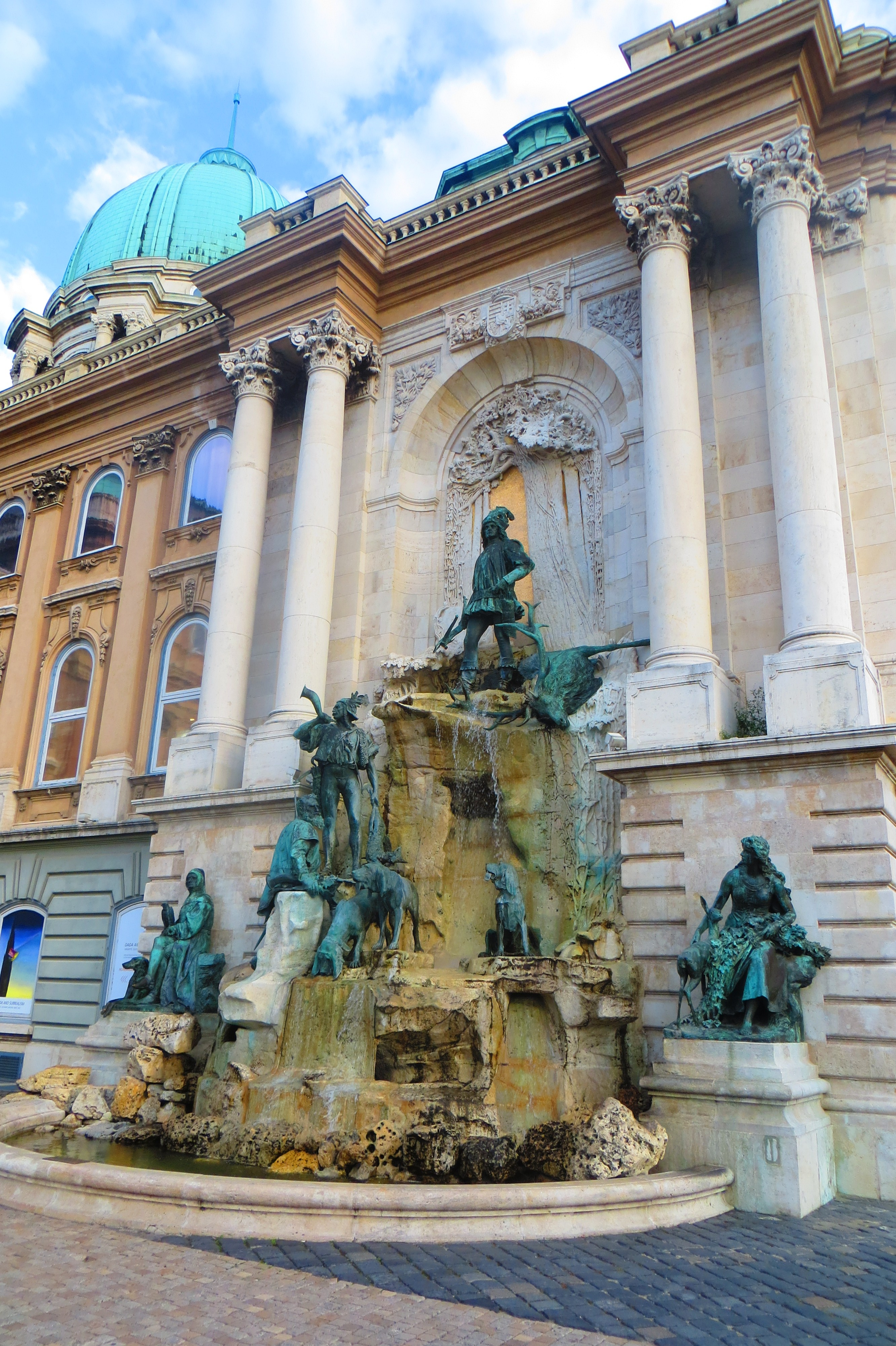
Matthias Fountain, before its renovation

Matthias Fountain (Mátyás kútja)

The spectacular fountain decorates the western forecourt of the palace. It shows a group of hunters led by King Matthias Corvinus together with hounds, a killed deer, Martius Galeotti with a hawk and Lovely Ilonka with a doe. This group of people stands between fallen rocks with water running down into a basin. The fountain was made by sculptor Alajos Stróbl. The dead deer was modelled upon a majestic stag killed in 1896 by poachers in the forest owned by Stróbl. The damaged sculpture was restored after the war. Nowadays it is probably the most photographed object in the palace.

Monument of Prince Eugene of Savoy

The equestrian statue of Prince Eugene of Savoy stands on the Danube terrace, in a prominent position, high above Budapest. The Neo-Baroque statue was made by sculptor József Róna for the town of Zenta, but the town could not afford the price. The monument was bought in 1900 as a temporary solution until the planned equestrian statue of King Franz Joseph was completed. This never happened, so Prince Eugen remained on his plinth. The plinth is decorated with two bronze reliefs showing the capture of the earth-works in Zenta and the decisive cavalry charge in the Battle of Zenta in 1697.

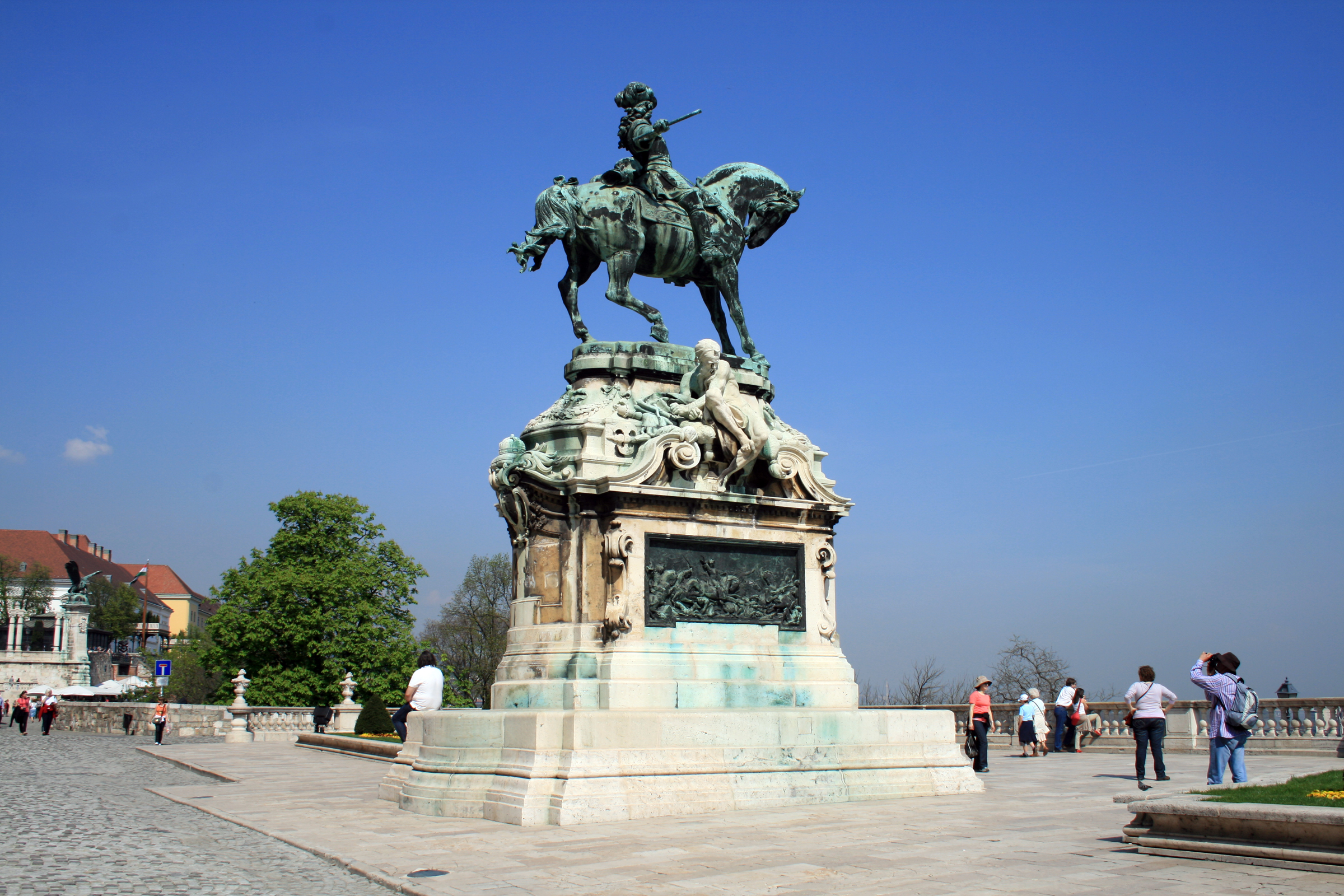
Monument of Prince Eugene of Savoy

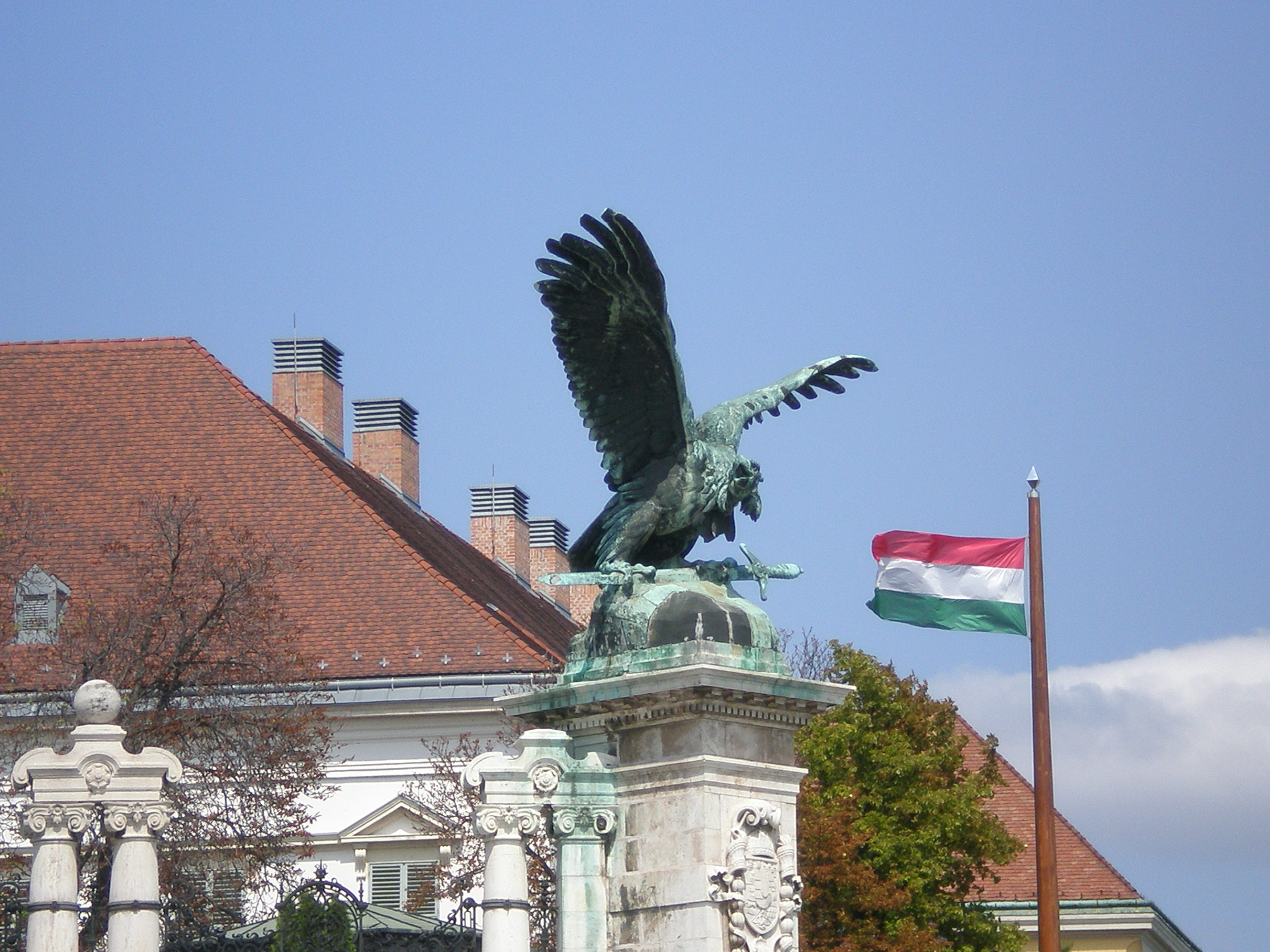
The mythological Turul bird, before its renovation

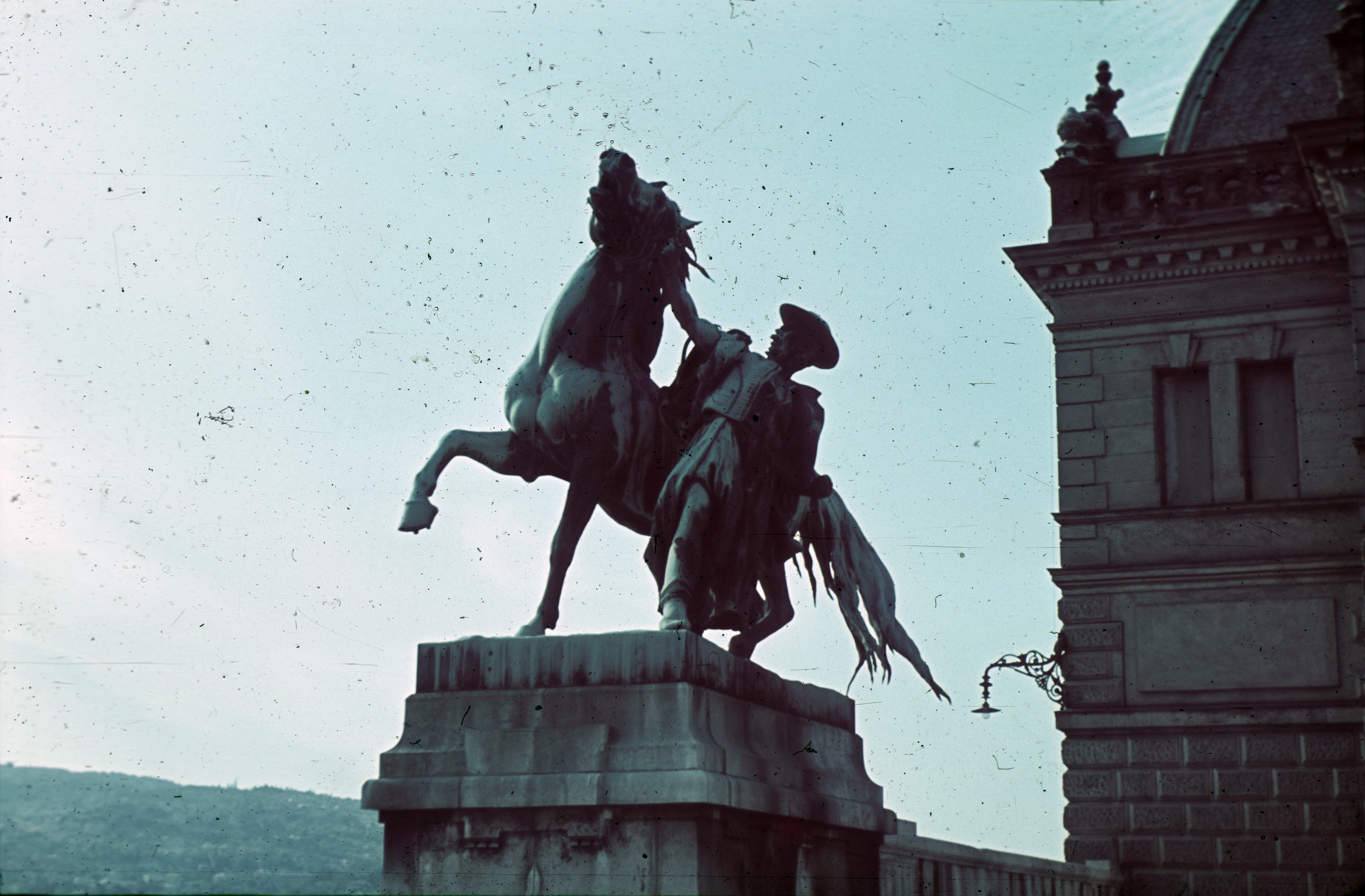
Statue of the horseherd, before its renovation

Horseherd (Csikós)

The statue of the Hortobágy National Park horseherd taming a wild horse originally stood in front of the Riding School in the former Újvilág terrace. It is the work of György Vastagh from 1901. The statue was displayed in the Exposition Universelle in Paris (1900). The damaged statue was removed during the 1960s, but it was later restored and erected in the western forecourt of the palace in 1983, next to the Matthias Fountain. It was moved back to its original location in front of the restored riding school in 2021.

Turulbird (Turulmadár)

The mythological Turul, high above the Danube, was made by Gyula Donáth in 1905. The plinth and the ornate Neo-Baroque rail (Gyula Jungfer's work) was seriously damaged during the siege of Buda, but they were restored in 1981, together with the broken coat-of-arms of the Kingdom of Hungary on the plinth.

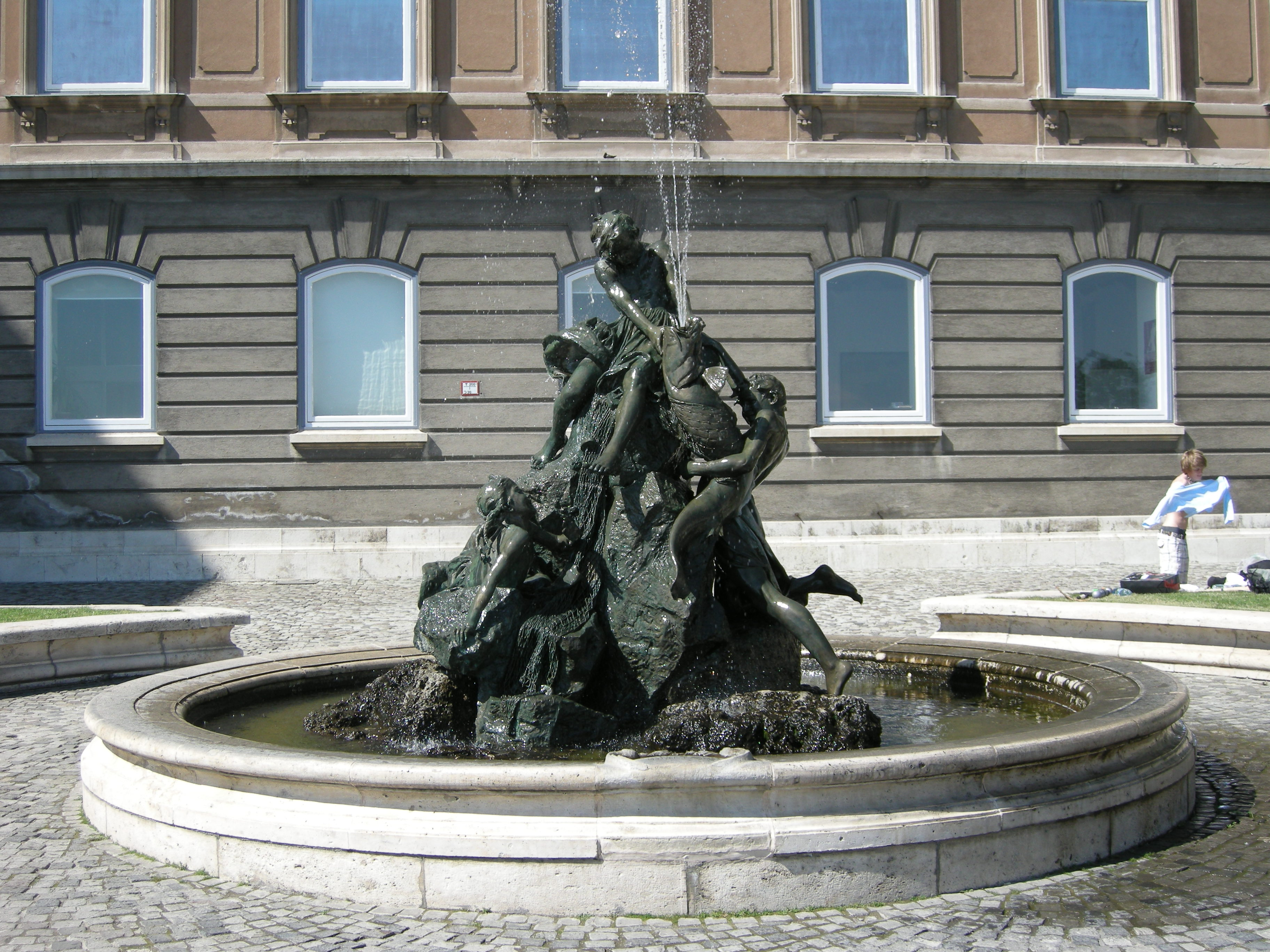
Fishing Children by Károly Senyei, before its renovation

Fishing Children

The Fountain of the Fishing Children on the Danube terrace is the work of sculptor Károly Senyei from 1912. It depicts two children grappling with a fish. The fine workmanship of the fishing net is remarkable. The fountain was removed in 1955 and re-erected at Rákóczi Square in Pest, but brought back to its original place in 1976. It was restored in 2001.

Csongor and Tünde

The two statues depicting Csongor and Tünde, literary figures from Mihály Vörösmarty's drama, originally decorated the Habsburg Steps in front of the palace. They are the works of sculptor Miklós Ligeti from 1903. The steps were demolished after the war, but the statues were saved and re-erected in 1976 on top of two simple concrete plinths near their original locations.

Lions

Two pairs of lions guard the monumental gate leading into Lions Court. The four statues are the works of János Fadrusz from 1901. The animals standing on the outer side of the gate are calm and dignified, while the inner ones are menacing. One lion was broken in two pieces during the war, but it was recreated in the 1950s.

War and Peace

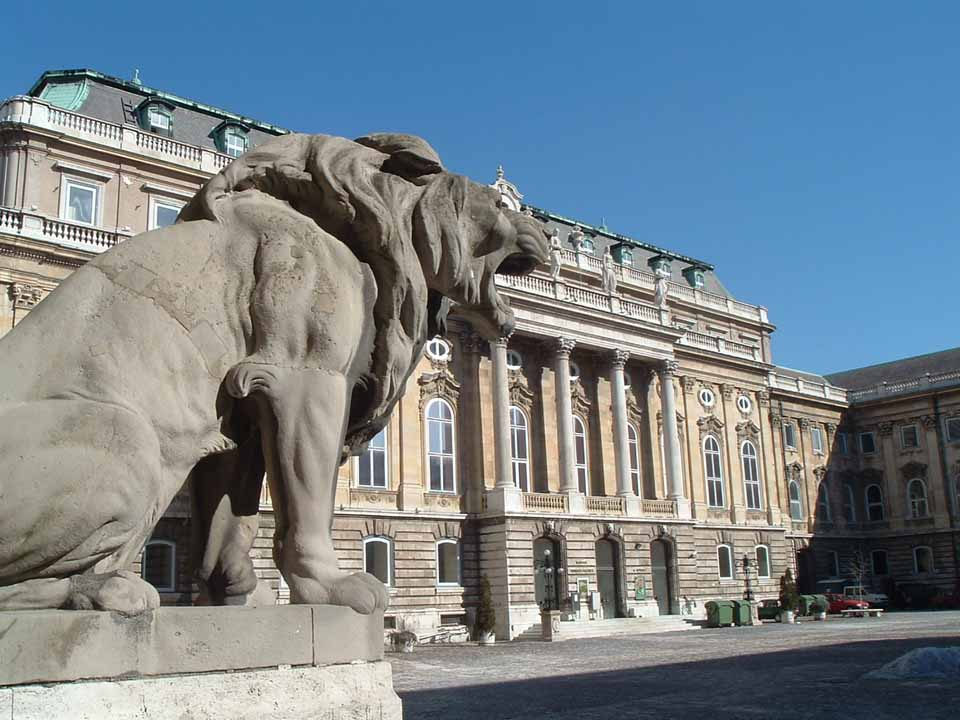
One of the lions in the inner courtyard

The monumental allegorical bronze statues of War and Peace stand beside the entrance to the Budapest History Museum. They are the work of Károly Senyei. Both War and Peace are represented by angels, one with a trumpet, the other with an olive branch. Under the angel of Peace is a returning soldier, while under the angel of War there is a dead Ottoman soldier and ancient Hungarian warriors.

There are sepulchral monuments in the Palatinal Crypt decorated with the statues of György Zala, Alajos Stróbl and Károly Senyei.

== Lost works of art ==
Hungaria

The monumental sculpture group decorated the main (northern) façade of the palace, facing Szent György Square. On the top of the attic, crowning the façade, stood the female figure of Hungaria, the allegorical representation of Hungary. Two semi-nude figures sat at her side, one male and one female, representing Industry and Commerce. The group was made by sculptor Gyula Jankovits in 1905. The sculpture was destroyed, together with the whole northern façade, during the 1950s.

Pediment Group

The pediment above the Habsburg Steps was decorated with an allegorical group of Károly Senyei representing the Apotheosis of the Dual Monarchy. It was destroyed during the 1950s, together with the great coat-of-arms of the Kingdom of Hungary which originally crowned the façade. The present-day pediment is plain, without any sculptural decoration.

Apotheosis of the Habsburg Dynasty

The ceiling of the Habsburg Room was decorated with a fresco representing the apotheosis of the Habsburg Dynasty. It was the last important work of Károly Lotz, painted in 1903, one year before his death. The artist was already seriously ill when he worked on the fresco. The "Apotheosis" followed the traditions of Baroque court painting, and the work was praised by contemporary critics. The fresco survived the war unscathed, but it was destroyed in the 1950s.

== Museums and institutions ==
The ground plan of the castle complex, with the location of the museums

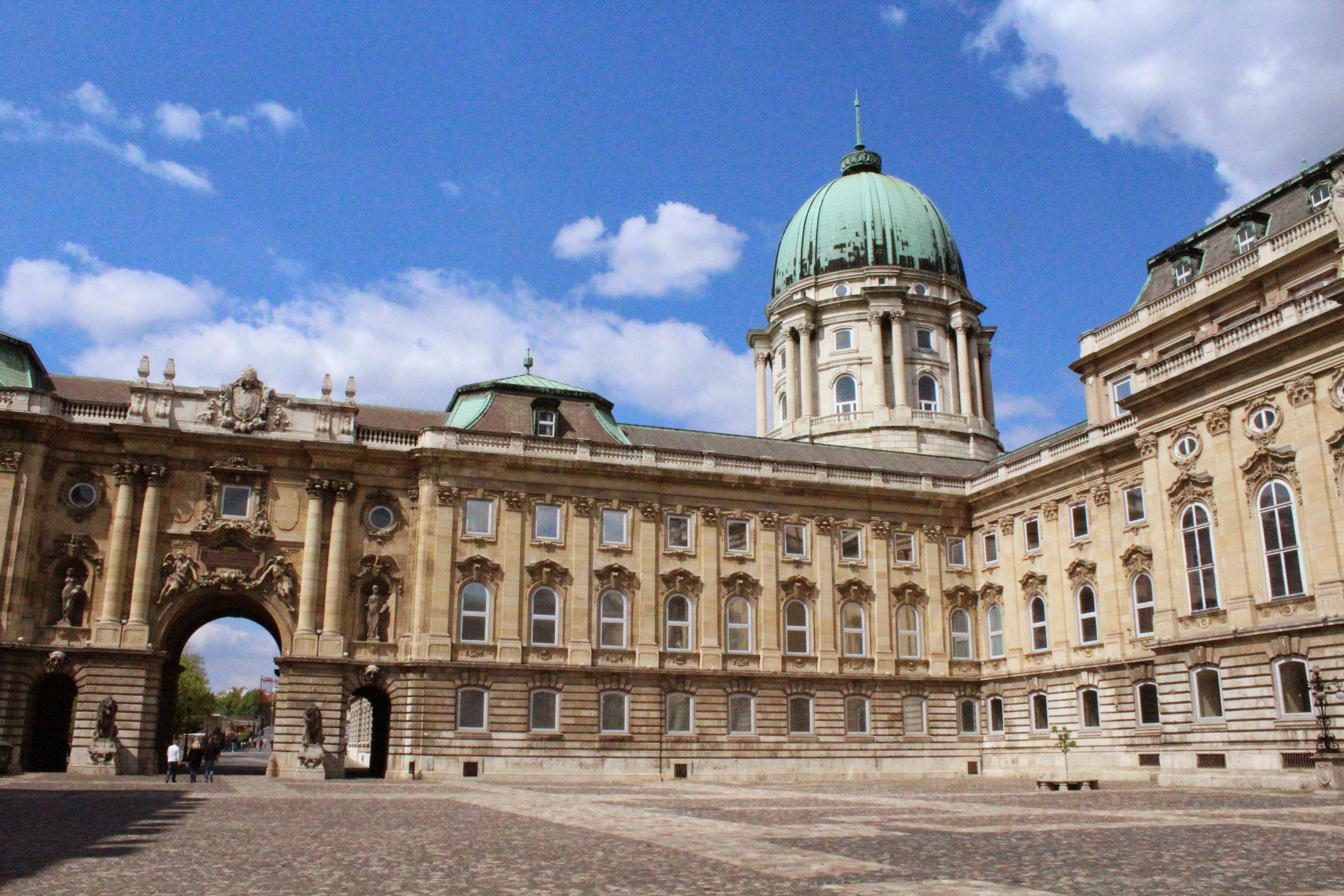
Baroque Oroszlános Gate of the Hungarian National Gallery

The Budapest History Museum is located in the southern wing of Buda Castle, in Building E, over four floors. It presents the history of Budapest from its beginnings until the modern era. The restored part of the medieval castle, including the Royal Chapel and the rib-vaulted Gothic Hall, belongs to the exhibition. The highlights of the exhibition are the Gothic statues of Buda Castle and a 14th-century silk tapestry decorated with the Angevin coats of arms. Small gardens were recreated in the medieval zwingers around the oldest parts of the building.

The Hungarian National Gallery is located in Building A, B, C and D. The museum presents the history of Hungarian art from the 11th century until the present, with a special exhibition concentrating on Gothic altarpieces (housed in the former Baroque Ballroom). The only surviving interior from the pre-war Royal Palace, the Palatinal Crypt, belongs to the museum.

"Building F" is occupied by the National Széchényi Library, the national library of Hungary. Its collection of rare and antique books, codices and manuscripts contains 35 Corvina pieces from the famous library of King Matthias Corvinus. The original Bibliotheca Corviniana was housed in the medieval Royal Castle of Buda.

== The cellars and caves ==
During the Ottoman era, the extensive cave system was utilized by the hunters to store tigers and Hungarian mountain bears.

The cellars stored an ornate wine collection from the Egri wine growing region in the Northern frontier of Hungary.

The cave system extends through the whole belly of the hill, with several exits to the surface, most of which have been sealed off to help preserve the natural caves, to prevent caving accidents, as well as to keep the district's residents whose cellars connect to the caves safe from burglars.

Not long before the Second World War there was a proposal for the caves to be opened for tourism, and construction work allowing for this purpose took place. After Hungary had joined the war in 1941, and after the Soviet army started advancing westward, the caves have been designated as bomb shelters, with some modifications to their existing infrastructure, bringing sewage and freshwater pipes to underground shower and toilet facilities. During the siege, field hospitals operated by the German and Hungarian armies, as well as ones manned by the Red Cross set up underground.

== Honors ==
Postage stamps depicting the castle were issued by Hungary on 26 March 1926, on 1 June 1967, and on 30 April 1986.

== See also ==
- Alcsút Palace
- Archduke Joseph's Palace
- Gödöllő Palace, summer residence of the Hungarian monarchs
- The House of Houdini
- Medieval Royal Palace (Buda Castle)
- Palace Chapel (Buda Castle)
- Palatinal Crypt
- Hofburg Palace
- Sándor Palace, residence of the president of Hungary
- List of castles in Hungary
