= Olbramice =

Olbramice may refer to places in the Czech Republic:

- Olbramice (Olomouc District), a municipality and village in the Olomouc Region
- Olbramice (Ostrava-City District), a municipality and village in the Moravian-Silesian Region
