= Gustav Frištenský =

Czech strongman and wrestler

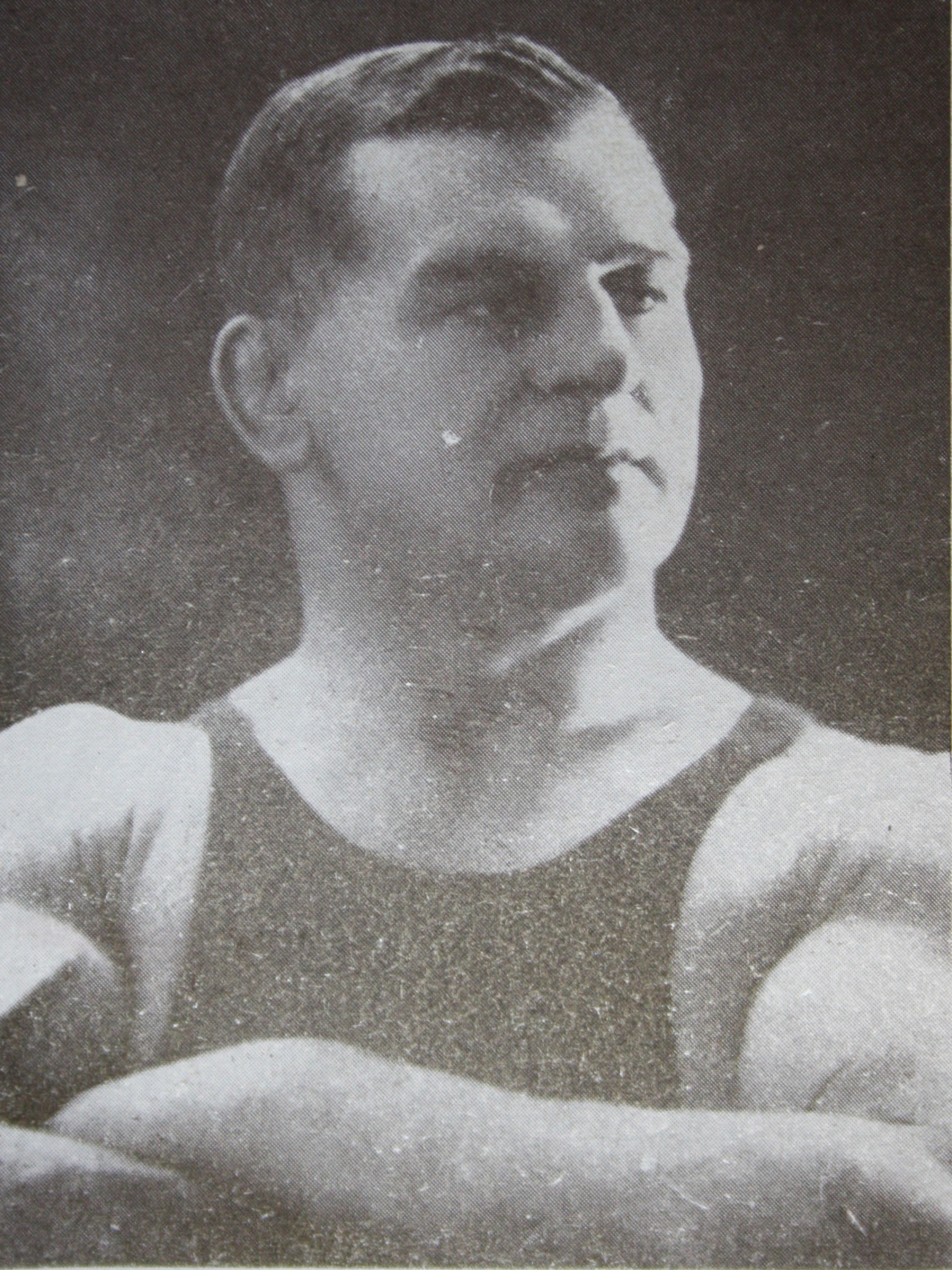
- Born: 18 May 1879; Kamhajek, Austria-Hungary
- Died: 6 April 1957 (aged 77); Litovel, Czechoslovakia
- Occupation(s): Strongman, wrestler

Gustav Frištenský (18 May 1879 – 6 April 1957) was a Czech strongman, Greco-Roman wrestler and professional wrestler who competed in the first half of the 20th century. During his career, he won almost 10,000 fights, the first one when he was just 19 years old and the last one when he was 72. He is considered the strongest Czech and a legendary symbol of strength for many Czechs.

== Biography ==
Frištenský was born as one of six children of Kateřina and Alois Frištenský in the village of Kamhajek, today a part of Křečhoř near Kolín. When he was seven years old he already rode the horses and plowed the fields. At fourteen, his parents sent him to learn to be a blacksmith. During a dispute in the workshop, one of his fellow apprentices passed him an incandescent horseshoe, which caused him serious burns of his hand. After three months of home remedies his father decided to let him learn to be a butcher. After training, he left for Brno, where he worked in the butchery of Moritz Soffer. While in Brno, he started to attend local Sokol and Hellas sports clubs. In 1900, The Hellas athletic club sent him to Vyškov to fight with the best wrestlers from Central Moravia. He won. The same year, he also won his first international competition, which was held in Prague. Three years later, he became the amateur European champion in Greco-Roman wrestling when he won in Rotterdam.

After returning home he found out that he had lost his job as a butcher's apprentice and decided to start a career as a professional wrestler. In the following years (before World War I), he travelled and competed across the world, including Southern and Northern America (he fought with Frank Gotch, George Lurich and Gus Schoenlein ("Americus"), among others). He lost some fights, but not too many. In 1917 he resided in Litovel, along with his wife Miroslava. In 1929, when he was almost 50 years old, he became the professional European champion when he won in Prague's Lucerna. He also appeared in the title role of the film Pražský kat (The Hangman of Prague). Along with his brother, he also purchased a farm in Lužice near Šternberk. The town was a part of the Sudetenland and their farm was confiscated by Germans after the Munich Agreement in 1938.

In 1943, during the World War II, Frištenský joined the resistance movement in Olomouc, however, he was imprisoned and his wife had to bribe a Nazi prison commander to free him. At the end of the war, their farm was ransacked when the soldiers of the Red Army resided there. It was later collectivized by the Communist authorities. In 1947, he became a widower. Frištenský was very impoverished in his later years and had to sell his trophies to survive. In 1956, he received the title Merited Master of Sports.

He died in April 1957 in Litovel, where he is buried.
