= Matthias Fountain =

Monument in Budapest, Hungary

Coordinates: 47°29′46″N 19°02′21″E

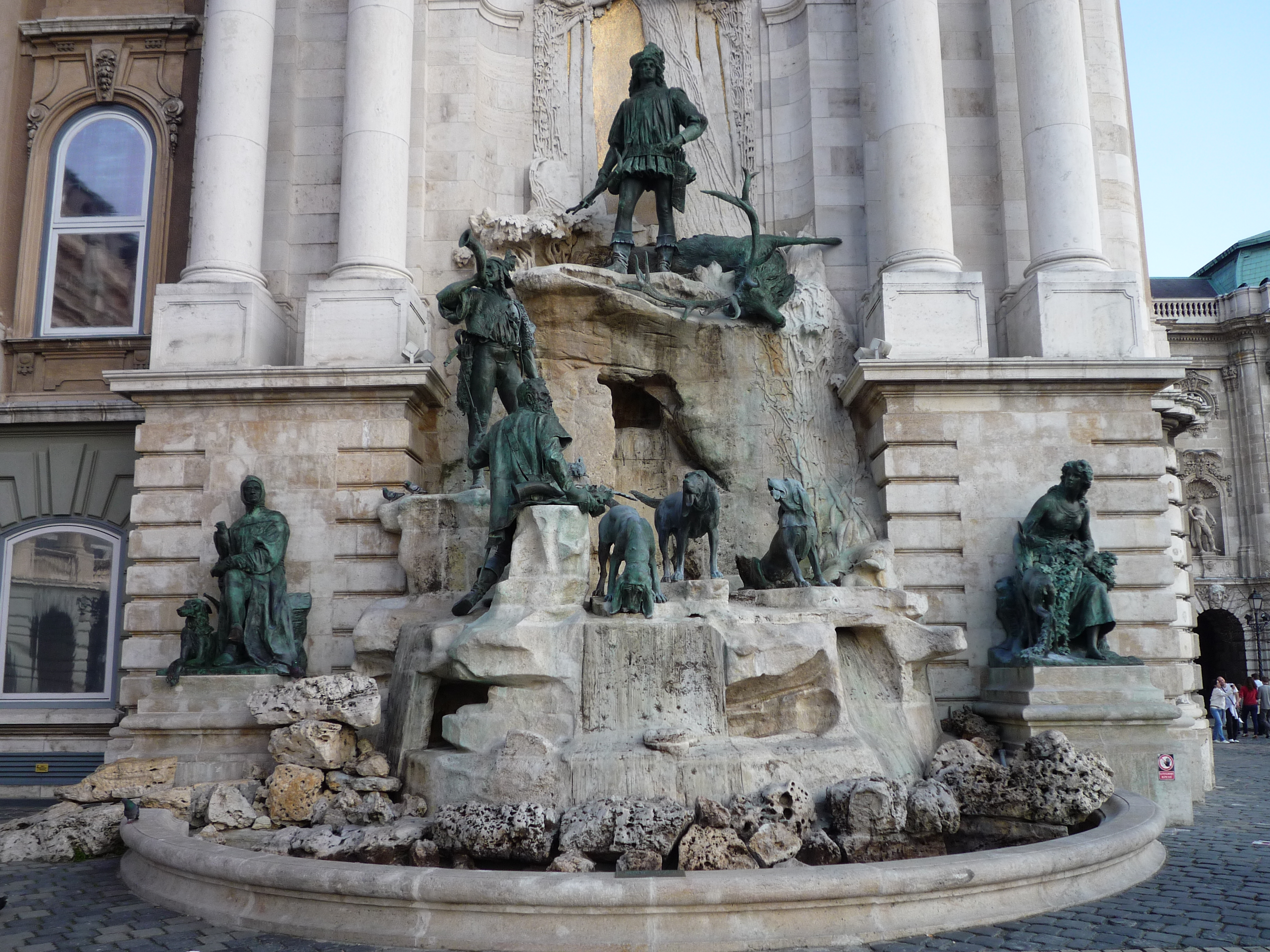
The Matthias Fountain in the western forecourt of Buda Palace

Matthias Fountain (Hungarian: Mátyás kútja, German: König Matthias Brunnen) is a monumental fountain group in the western forecourt of Buda Castle, Budapest. Alajos Stróbl's Neo-Baroque masterpiece is one of the most frequently photographed landmark in the Hungarian capital. It is sometimes called the 'Trevi Fountain of Budapest'.

== Description ==
The group depicts a hunting party led by Matthias Corvinus, the king of Hungary. The bronze figures are standing on heaps of rocks against the backdrop of the northern facade of the former Castle Church. Water is running down between the cracks of the boulders. The theatrical arrangement resembles the famous Trevi Fountain in Rome although it is on a much smaller scale.

The monumental facade behind the fountain is flanked by two pairs of giant Corinthian columns. The original balustrade crowning and the Mansard roof was more elaborate but it was simplified after being damaged in the Second World War. The central niche forms a triumphal arch which is decorated with King Matthias' personal coat of arms. The Art Nouveau arboreal decoration of the niche creates an interesting stylistic contrast with the more traditional taste of the fountain. The surface is decorated with a plain golden mosaic.

King Matthias is standing on the highest rock in hunting attire. He is holding a crossbow in his right and a huge dead stag lies at his feet. On the lower rocks a henchman blows his horn and the leader of the hunting group rests sitting on a boulder with his back towards the viewer. Three hounds complete the central group.

There are two more bronze figures on the sides of the basin. They are connected to the central group with gestures and gazes but they have their own plinths. On the right is Szép Ilonka (Helen the Fair), heroine of a famous 19th century ballad by Mihály Vörösmarty. According to the ballad, Ilonka and Matthias fell in love when he was hunting incognito. When Ilonka found out his true identity and assumed that this was an impossible love, she died of a broken heart. The girl is looking towards the king protecting her tame fawn from the hunters. On the left is the Italian chronicler, Galeotto Marzio who lived in King Matthias' court. A sighthound rests at his feet and a falcon perches on his left fist.

== History ==
The fountain was erected by sculptor Alajos Stróbl and Alajos Hauszmann, master builder of the reconstruction of the Royal Palace. After the composition scheme was approved by King Franz Joseph, Stróbl began to work in 1899. The figure of the henchman won a state gold medal in 1901. The stag was modelled after a majestic animal which was killed in 1896 by poachers in the forest where Stróbl went hunting. The models for the hounds were sent by duke Pálffy to the sculptor. The fountain was inaugurated in the presence of the king in 1904.

During the Second World War the middle dog sculpture was destroyed. But was reconstructed by Jenő Grantner.

Matthias Fountain was restored in 2010.

== Gallery ==
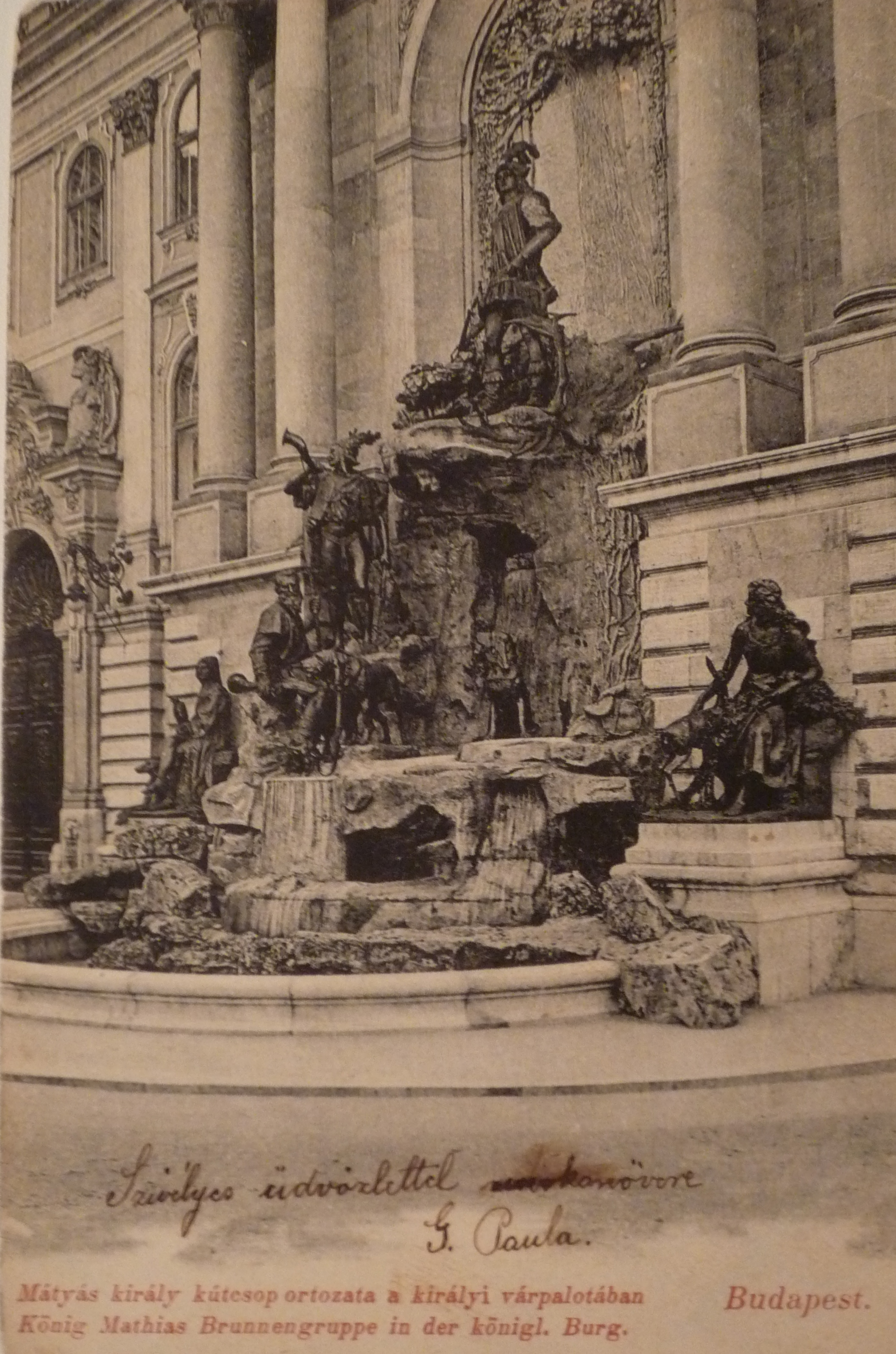
Matthias Fountain in 1905

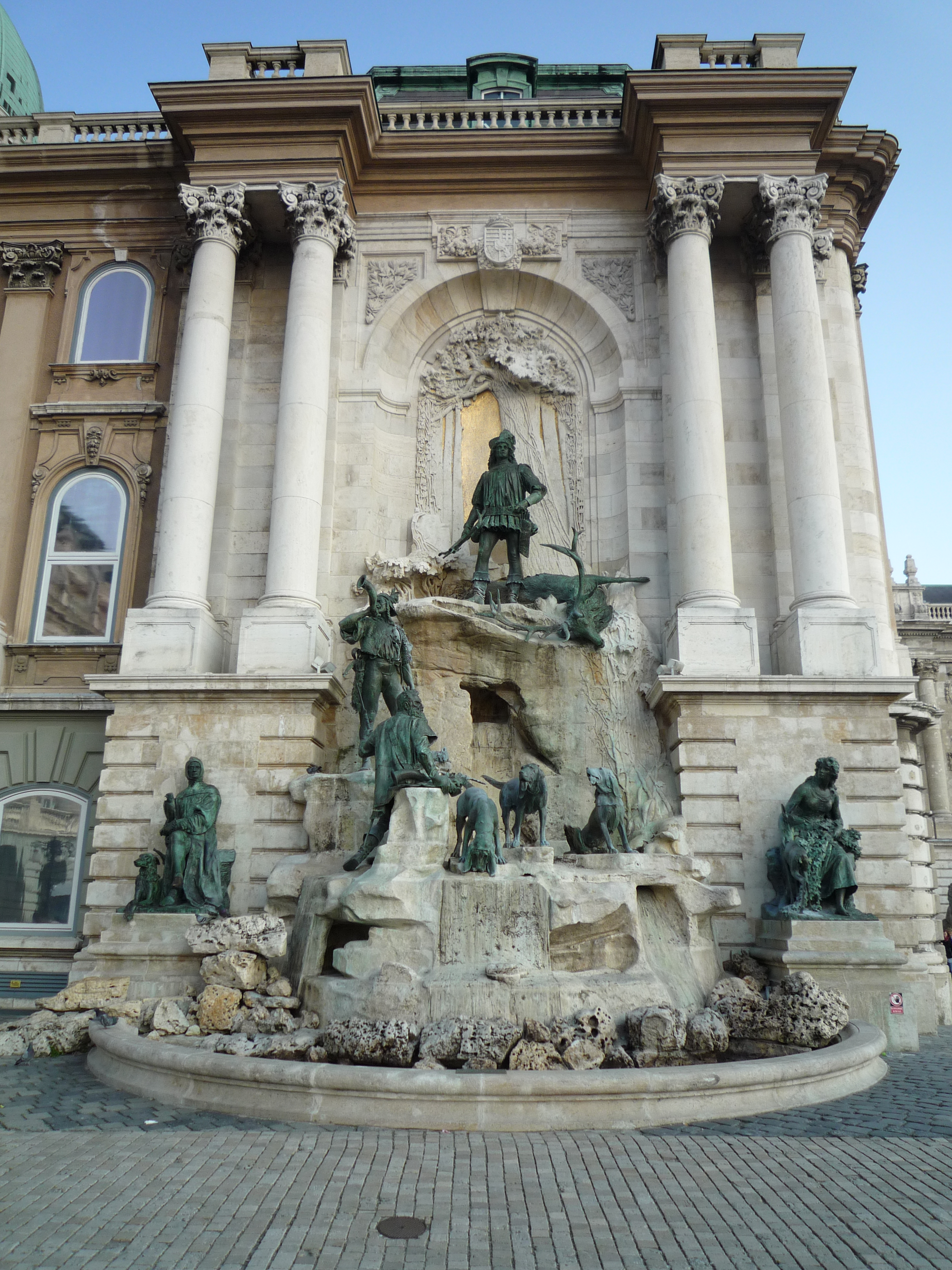
Matthias Fountain in 2011

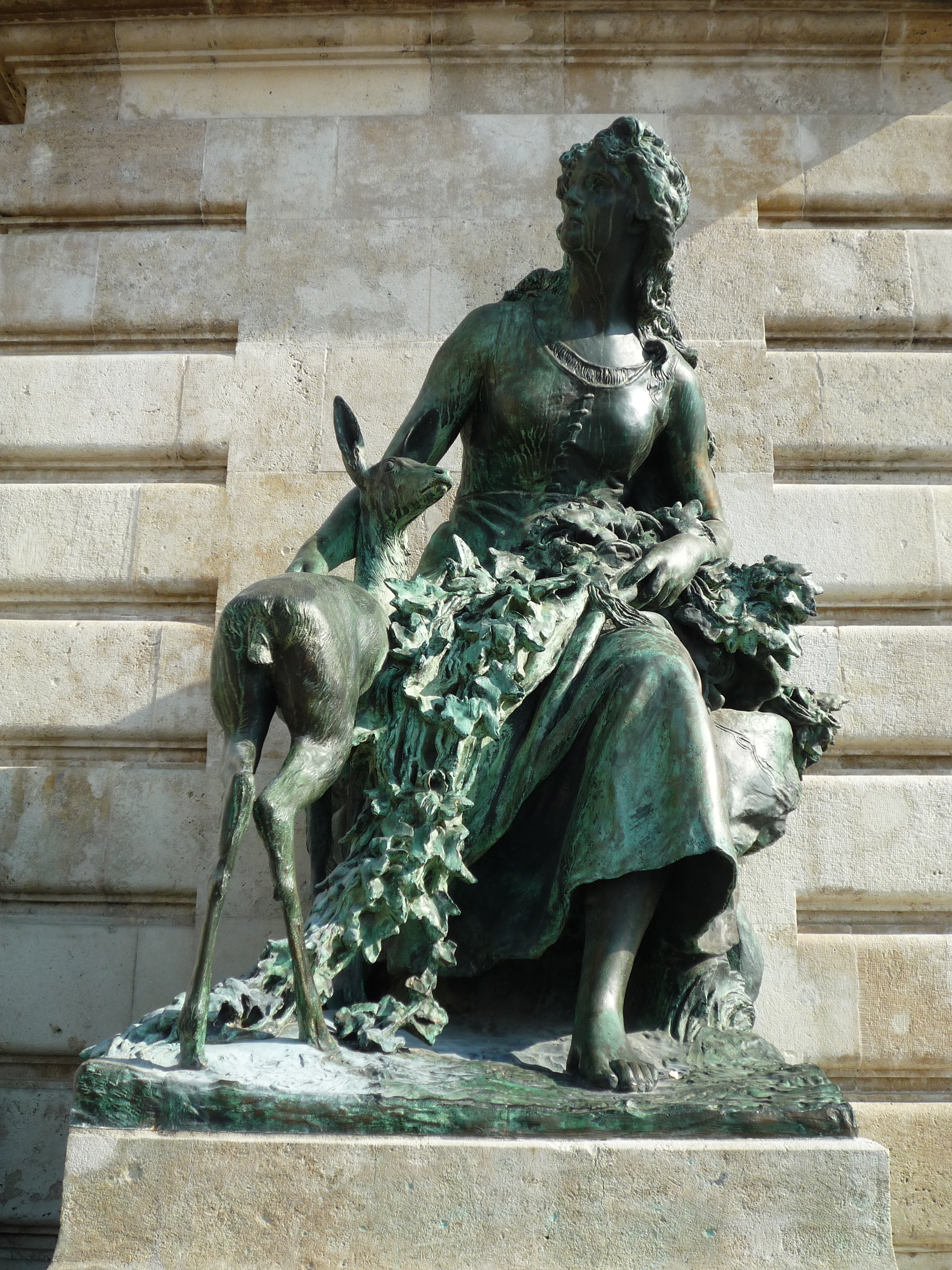
The figure of Szép Ilonka

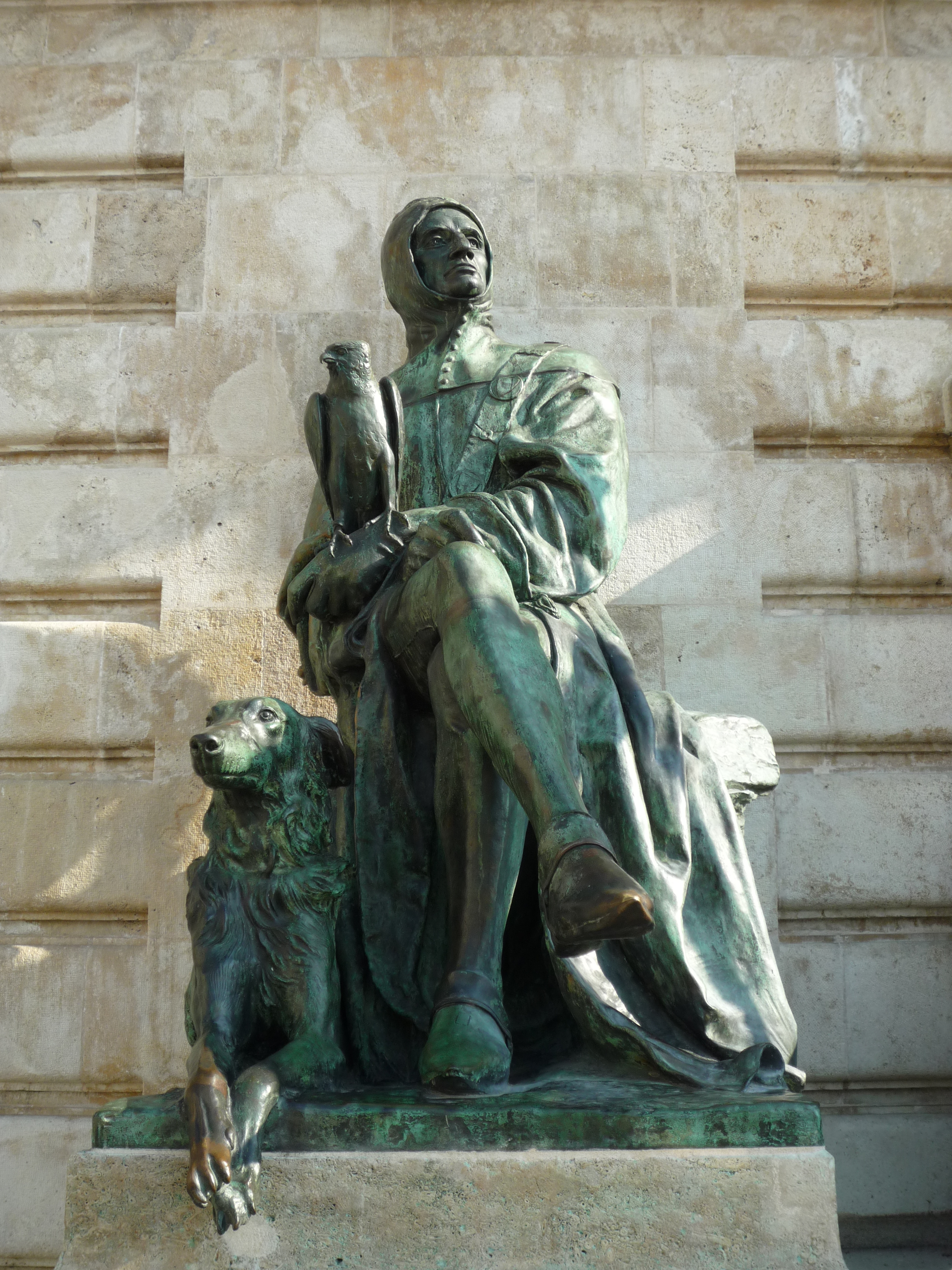
The figure of Galeotto Marzio

== See also ==
- Works of art in Buda Castle
