= Křečhoř =

- Municipality
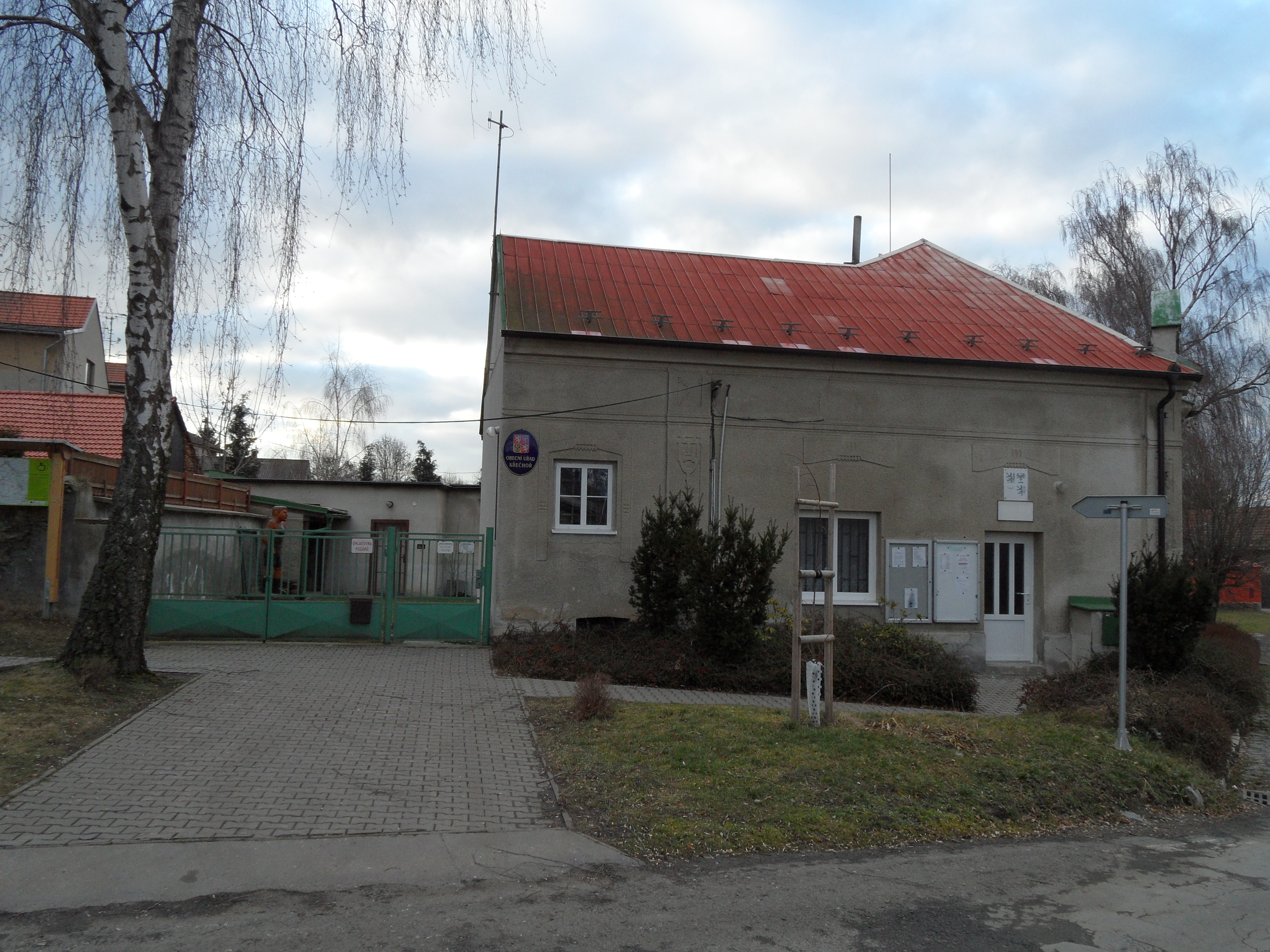
- Municipal office

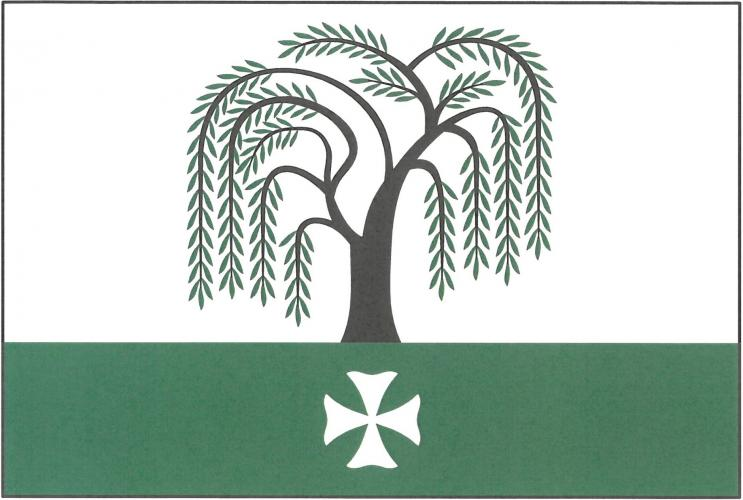
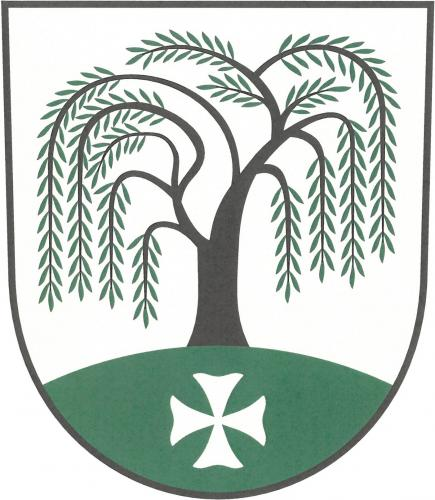
- Flag Coat of arms

- Location in the Czech Republic
- Coordinates: 50°1′32″N 15°7′38″E
- Country: Czech Republic
- Region: Central Bohemian
- District: Kolín
- First mentioned: 1295

Area
  - Total: 9.68 km^{2} (3.74 sq mi)
- Elevation: 307 m (1,007 ft)

Population (2026-01-01)
  - Total: 584
  - Density: 60.3/km^{2} (156/sq mi)
- Time zone: UTC+1 (CET)
  - Summer (DST): UTC+2 (CEST)
- Postal code: 280 02
- Website: www.krechor.cz

Křečhoř is a municipality and village in Kolín District in the Central Bohemian Region of the Czech Republic. It has about 600 inhabitants.

== Administrative division ==
Křečhoř consists of three municipal parts (in brackets population according to the 2021 census):

- Křečhoř (373)
- Kamhajek (115)
- Kutlíře (48)

== Etymology ==
The village of Křečhoř was named after the nearby hill, which was probably originally called Křeče hora (meaning "Křek's mountain" or "Křeč's mountain") and today is also named Křečhoř.

== Geography ==
Křečhoř is located about 4 kilometres (2 mi) northwest of Kolín and 43 km (27 mi) east of Prague. The southwestern part of the municipal territory lies in the Upper Sázava Hills. The northeastern part lies in the Central Elbe Table. The highest point is the hill Křečhoř at 333 m (1,093 ft) above sea level.

== History ==
The first written mention of Křečhoř is from 1295. In 1757, during the Seven Years' War, Křehoč was the site of the Battle of Kolín.

== Demographics ==
Historical population

Year	Pop.	±%
1869	604	—
1880	679	+12.4%
1890	716	+5.4%
1900	745	+4.1%
1910	823	+10.5%

Year	Pop.	±%
1921	720	−12.5%
1930	655	−9.0%
1950	512	−21.8%
1961	481	−6.1%
1970	445	−7.5%

Year	Pop.	±%
1980	444	−0.2%
1991	394	−11.3%
2001	416	+5.6%
2011	445	+7.0%
2021	536	+20.4%

Source: Censuses

== Transport ==
The I/12 road from Prague to Kolín runs along the northern municipal border.

== Sights ==
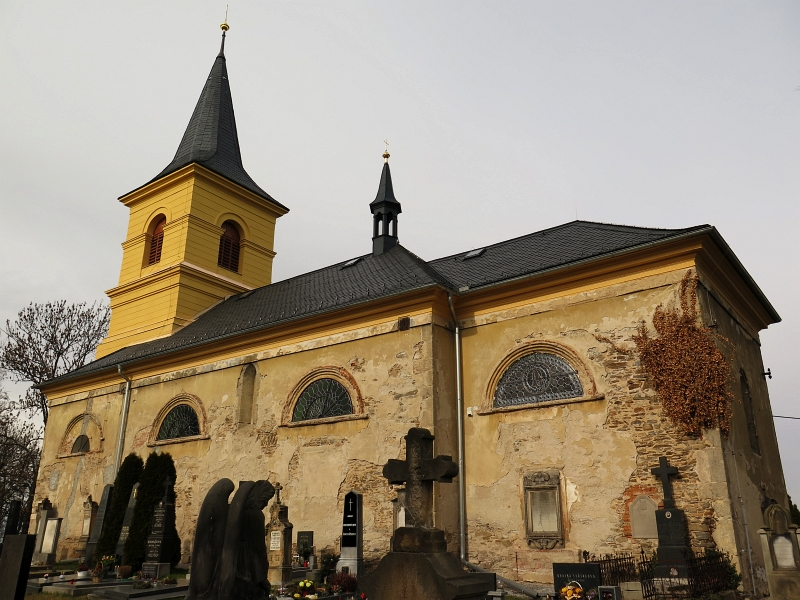
Church of the Corpus Christi

The main landmark of Křečhoř is the Church of the Corpus Christi. It was originally a Gothic church from the early 14th century, rebuilt in the Empire style in 1846–1848.

On the northwestern edge of the village of Křečhoř is a memorial to the Battle of Kolín. It was made in 1898 according to the design by Václav Weinzettl.

== Notable people ==
- Gustav Frištenský (1879–1957), strongman and wrestler
