= Karl Kostersitz von Marenhorst =

Austro-Hungarian general

Karl (or Carl) Kostersitz von Marenhorst (né Kostersitz) (29 June 1839 – 1 October 1897) was an Austro-Hungarian general, field marshal lieutenant and artist.

He held a variety of posts in the Austro-Hungarian military and distinguished himself in the Austro-Hungarian campaign in Bosnia and Herzegovina in 1878. He was also known for his drawings, including many drawings from Sarajevo.

He was born in Litovel, Moravia to Josef Kostersitz, a municipal civil servant, and married native Hungarian Leopoldine Vidasý. He died in Josefov, Bohemia.
