= Lubomír Šik =

Czech historian (1928–2026)

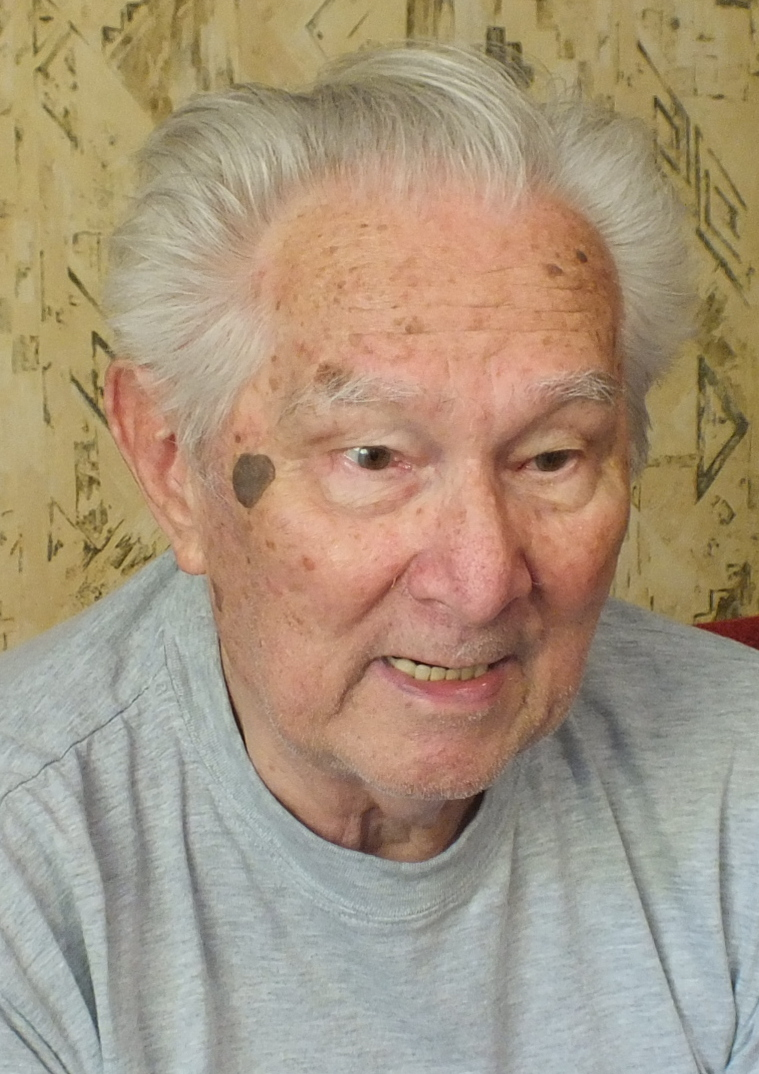
Šik in 2017

Lubomír Šik (2 February 1928 – 1 March 2026) was a Czech regional historian.

== Life and career ==
Šik was born in Litovel on 2 February 1928. Following World War II, he graduated from the industrial school in Šumperk. He graduated in 1949, but under the new regime it was unthinkable that he would be able to continue his studies at university as the son of a self-employed man. His first job was working in the Křižík turntable production company in Litovel. In addition to his job, he also devoted himself to theatre and served on the committee of the United Racing Club Tesla Litovel. He was the chairman of the Litovel photo club – first at the Křižík (Tesla) company and later within the Associated Racing Club ROH. At the end of the 1960s, he led the local organization Junák. He also devoted himself to lecturing but after 1968 during the normalization period, due to his involvement in the scout movement he was not allowed to participate in public life any further, so he was not able to resume his lectures in the field of history and art until the end of the 1970s years. He continued to work at Tesla Litovel, which he left when he retired in 1988.

He published his first book shortly after his retirement at the beginning of 1989 and dedicated it to the history of his former employer, Tesla Litovel. The publication History of Gramophone Production in Litovel was published on the occasion of the 40th anniversary of the company and its first edition was published in only a few copies.

Šik died on 1 March 2026, at the age of 98.

== Awards ==
In January 2010, Lubomír Šik was appointed an honorary member of the Museum Society of the Litovel Region for life. On 29 October 2012, he was awarded the title of Personality of Litovel for his popularization of the town's history.
