= Battle of Kolín =

1757 battle of the Seven Years' War

- Part of the Third Silesian War (Seven Years' War)
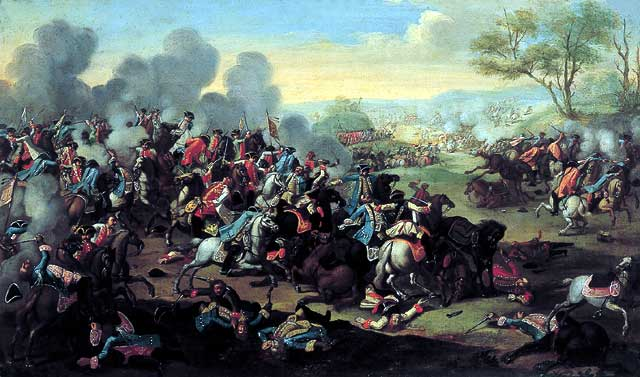
- Schlacht bei Kolin, unknown artist
Date	18 June 1757
Location	Kolín, Bohemia, (now the Central Bohemian Region of the Czech Republic) about 55 km (34 mi) east of Prague 50°01′44″N 15°07′19″E
Result	Austrian victory

Belligerents
(Holy Roman Empire) Austria	(Kingdom of Prussia) Prussia

Commanders and leaders
(Holy Roman Empire) Leopold von Daun	(Kingdom of Prussia) Frederick the Great

Strength
53,790–54,000; 154 guns	33,000–34,000; 90 guns

Casualties and losses
8,000–8,100	13,733–14,000
- Location within Czech Republic

Frederick the Great
current battle
First Silesian War
Second Silesian War
Third Silesian War

The Battle of Kolín (Kolin) on 18 June 1757 saw 54,000 Austrians under Count von Daun defeat 34,000 Prussians under Frederick the Great during the Third Silesian War (Seven Years' War). Prussian attempts to turn the Austrian right flank turned into piecemeal frontal attacks and were defeated in five and a half hours of combat. The Prussians lost 13,733 men, the Austrians 8,100. Frederick gave up the Siege of Prague as well as his planned march on Vienna and retreated to Saxony.

== Background ==
Frederick II of Prussia had won the bloody Battle of Prague against Austria on 6 May 1757 and was besieging the city. Austrian Marshal Daun arrived too late to fight, but picked up 16,000 men who escaped from the battle. With this army he slowly moved to relieve Prague. Frederick stopped the bombardment of Prague and maintained the siege under Duke Ferdinand of Brunswick, while the king marched against the Austrians on 13 June along with Prince Moritz of Anhalt-Dessau's troops.

Frederick took 34,000 men to intercept Daun. Daun knew that the Prussian forces were too weak to both besiege Prague and keep him away from Prague for a longer time (or to fight the Austrian army reinforced by the Prague garrison), so his Austrian forces took defensive positions on hills near Kolín on the night of 17 June. At noon on 18 June, Frederick attacked the Austrians, who were waiting on the defensive with a force of 35,160 infantry, 18,630 cavalry and 154 guns. The battlefield of Kolín consisted of gently rolling hill slopes.

Frederick's plan was to envelop the Austrian right wing with most of his army. Along the Austrian lines (Prussian right wing and center) he kept only enough troops to hide the concentration on the Prussian left wing. The Prussian main force would turn right toward the Austrians to attack their right flank. The Prussian left wing would locally outnumber the Austrians. After the Austrian right wing was defeated the battle would be decided.

== Battle ==
Frederick's main force turned toward the Austrians too early and attacked their defensive positions frontally instead of outflanking them. Austrian Croatian light infantry (Grenzers) played an important role in this; harassing the regular Prussian infantry under Generals Christopher Hermann von Manstein and Joachim Christian von Tresckow, they provoked them into a premature attack.

Austrian musket and artillery fire stopped Frederick's advance. A counterattack by the Austrian right was defeated by Prussian cavalry and Frederick poured more troops into the ensuing gap in the enemy line. This new assault was first halted and then crushed by Austrian cavalry. By afternoon, after about five hours of fighting, the Prussians were disoriented and Daun's troops were driving them back. Prussian cuirassiers under Oberst Friedrich Wilhelm von Seydlitz (promoted to major-general on that day) finally showed up. There were many charges and counter-charges on the Křečhoř Hill. The first Guard battalion under General Friedrich Bogislav von Tauentzien saved the Prussian army from a worse fate, covering the Prussian retreat.

Kerls, wollt ihr den ewig leben?
(Rascals, would you live forever?)

— Frederick the Great, to the hesitating Guards, Battle of Kolin

== Results ==
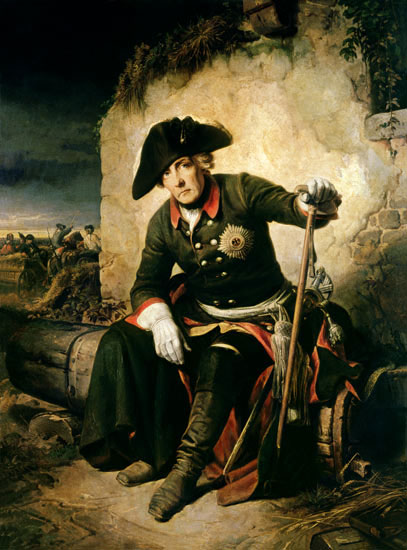
Frederick II after the Battle of Kolin

The battle was Frederick's first defeat in this war, and forced him to abandon his intended march on Vienna, raise his siege of Prague on 20 June, and fall back on Litoměřice. The Austrians, reinforced by the 48,000 troops in Prague, followed them, 100,000 strong, and, falling on Prince August Wilhelm of Prussia, who was retreating eccentrically (for commissariat reasons) at Zittau, inflicted a severe check upon him. The king retreated from Bohemia to Saxony.

== Reception ==
- Following the battle, the Empress Maria Theresa founded the Military Order of Maria Theresa
- The Kolingasse in the 9th District of Vienna was named after this victory in 1870.
- Memorials to the battle were erected in Křečhoř and Nová Ves I.

== General and cited references ==
- Bodart, Gaston (1908). Militär-historisches Kriegs-Lexikon (1618–1905).
- Asprey, Robert. "Frederick the Great: A Magnificent Enigma", Ticknor & Fields, 2007 ISBN 0-89919-352-8
- Chase Maenius. The Art of War[s]: Paintings of Heroes, Horrors and History. 2014. ISBN 978-1320309554
- Clodfelter, M. (2017). Warfare and Armed Conflicts: A Statistical Encyclopedia of Casualty and Other Figures, 1492–2015 (4th ed.). Jefferson, North Carolina: McFarland. ISBN 978-0786474707.
- Duffy, Christopher. 2013 "By Force of Arms: Vol 2 of The Austrian Army in the Seven Years War", Emperor's Press, ISBN 978-1-883476-30-4
- Duffy, Christopher. The Army of Frederick the Great, Emperor Press, ISBN 1-883476-02-X
- Duffy, Christopher, The Army of Maria Theresa, Terence Wise, ISBN 0-7153-7387-0
- Millar, Simon. 2001 Kolin 1757: Frederick the Great's First Defeat, Osprey Publishing, ISBN 1-84176-297-0
- Seldes, George. 1985. The Great Thoughts. Ballantine Books, New York. p. 143 ISBN 9780345298874
- Zabecki, D. T. (2014). Germany at War: 400 Years of Military History. ABC-CLIO.
