= Nová Ves I =

- Municipality
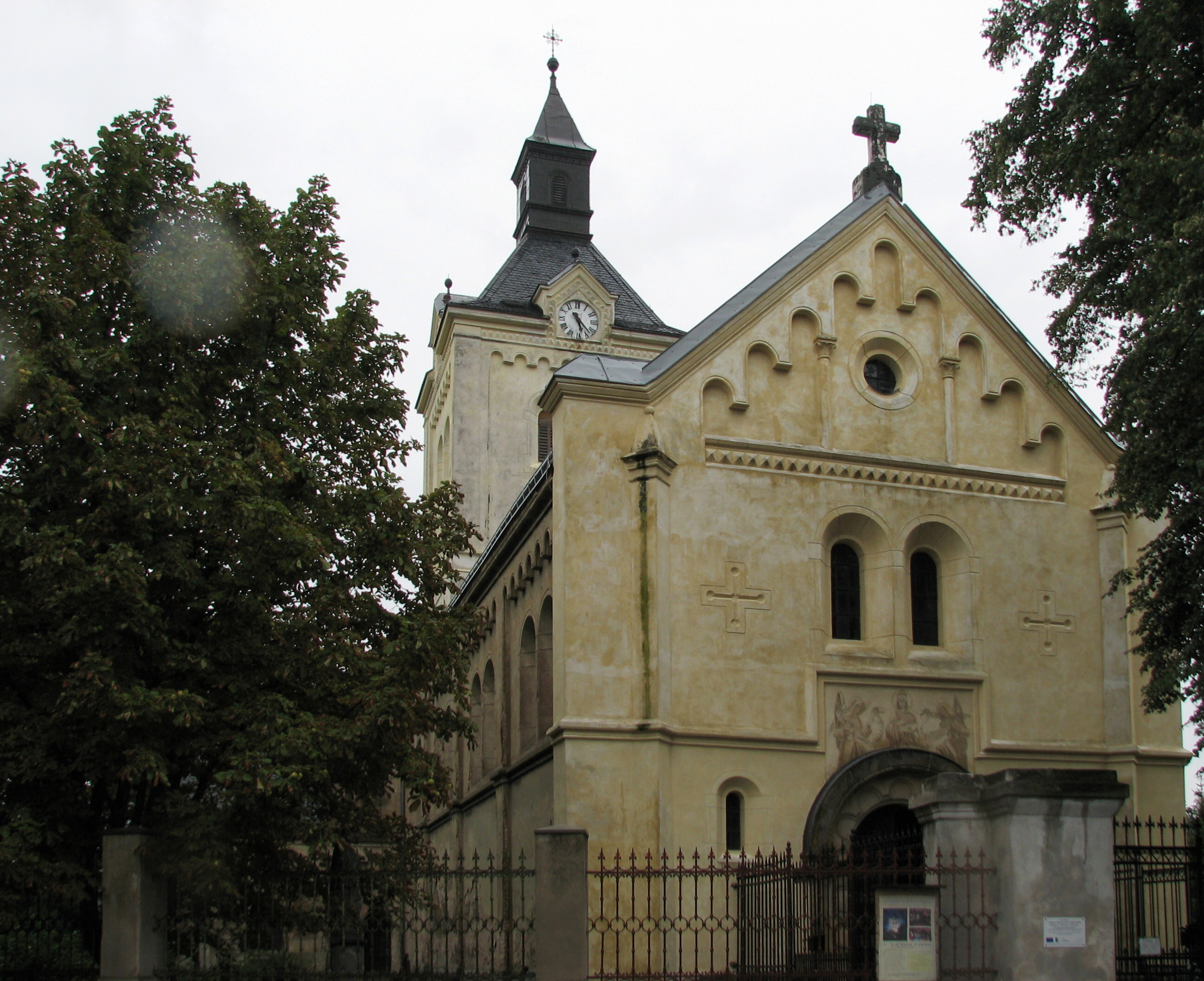
- Church of Saint Wenceslaus

- Location in the Czech Republic
- Coordinates: 50°3′8″N 15°8′40″E
- Country: Czech Republic
- Region: Central Bohemian
- District: Kolín
- First mentioned: 1290

Area
  - Total: 10.31 km^{2} (3.98 sq mi)
- Elevation: 200 m (660 ft)

Population (2026-01-01)
  - Total: 1,390
  - Density: 135/km^{2} (349/sq mi)
- Time zone: UTC+1 (CET)
  - Summer (DST): UTC+2 (CEST)
- Postal code: 280 02
- Website: www.novaves.cz

Nová Ves I is a municipality and village in Kolín District in the Central Bohemian Region of the Czech Republic. It has about 1,400 inhabitants.

== Administrative division ==
Nová Ves I consists of two municipal parts (in brackets population according to the 2021 census):

- Nová Ves I (808)
- Ohrada (507)

== Etymology ==
The name Nová Ves means 'new village' in Czech. The Roman numeral in the name serves to distinguish it from the nearby villages with the same name: Nová Ves II (part of Rostoklaty) and Nová Ves III (part of Svojšice).

== Geography ==
Nová Ves I is located about 4 kilometres (2 mi) northwest of Kolín and 45 km (28 mi) east of Prague. It lies in a flat agricultural landscape in the Central Elbe Table. The highest point is the hill Bedřichov at 279 m (915 ft) above sea level. The municipality is situated on the left bank of the Elbe River.

== History ==
The first written mention of Nová Ves I is from 1290, when the village was bought by the Sedlec Abbey. From 1437, Nová Ves I belonged to the Kolín estate. In 1757, during the Seven Years' War, Nová Ves I was partly the site of the Battle of Kolín.

== Demographics ==
Historical population

| Year | Pop. | ±% |
|---|---|---|
| 1869 | 971 | — |
| 1880 | 1,060 | +9.2% |
| 1890 | 1,190 | +12.3% |
| 1900 | 1,230 | +3.4% |
| 1910 | 1,375 | +11.8% |

| Year | Pop. | ±% |
|---|---|---|
| 1921 | 1,343 | −2.3% |
| 1930 | 1,391 | +3.6% |
| 1950 | 1,289 | −7.3% |
| 1961 | 1,325 | +2.8% |
| 1970 | 1,207 | −8.9% |

| Year | Pop. | ±% |
|---|---|---|
| 1980 | 1,138 | −5.7% |
| 1991 | 1,039 | −8.7% |
| 2001 | 1,067 | +2.7% |
| 2011 | 1,271 | +19.1% |
| 2021 | 1,315 | +3.5% |

Source: Censuses

== Transport ==
The I/38 road (the section from Kutná Hora to Nymburk) runs through the municipality. The I/12 road from Prague to Kolín runs along the southern municipal border.

Nová Ves I is located on the railway line Prague–Kolín.

== Sights ==
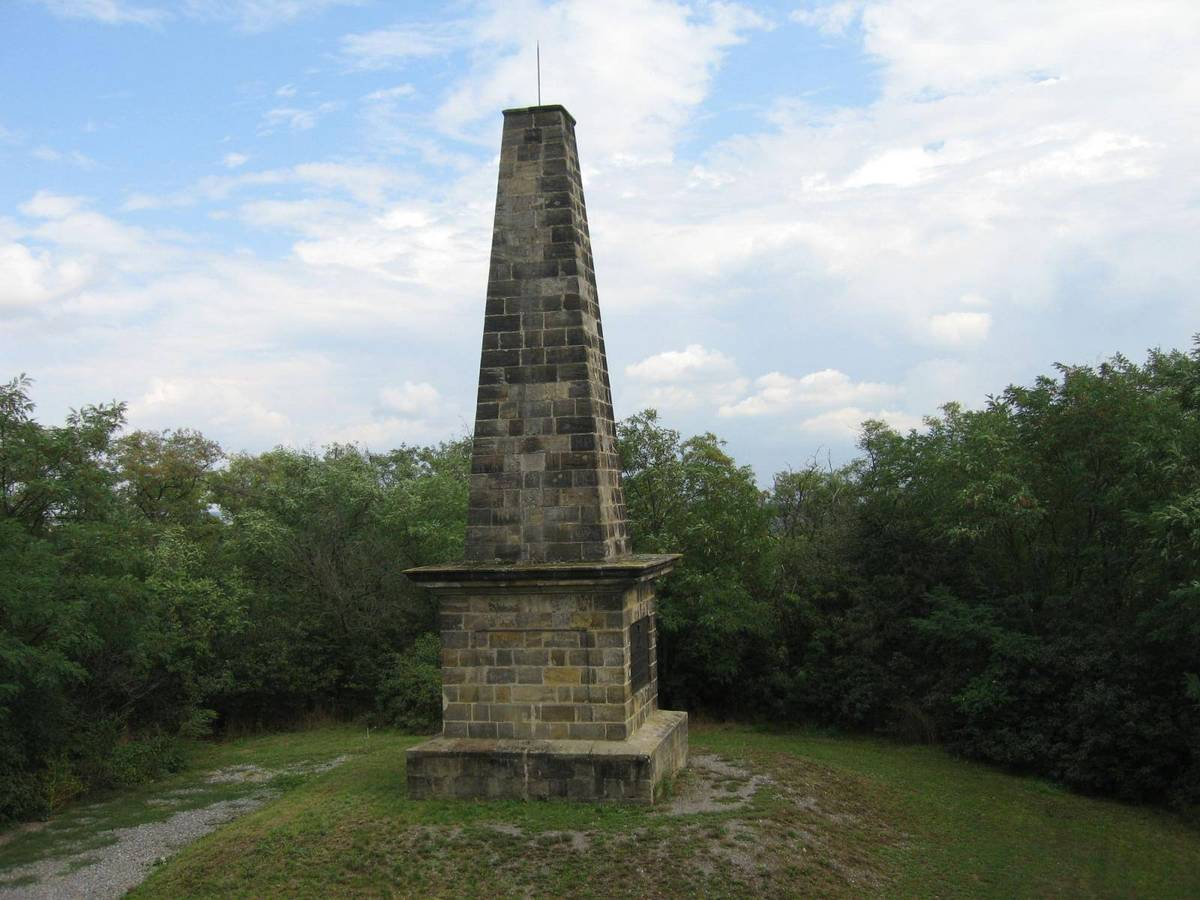
Memorial to the Battle of Kolín

The main landmark of Nová Ves I is the Church of Saint Wenceslaus. It was built in the Neo-Romanesque style in 1884, but its core comes from a Gothic church from the 14th century.

On the top of the hill Bedřichov is a memorial to the Battle of Kolín. It was made in 1840.
