= Alajos Stróbl =

Hungarian sculptor and artist

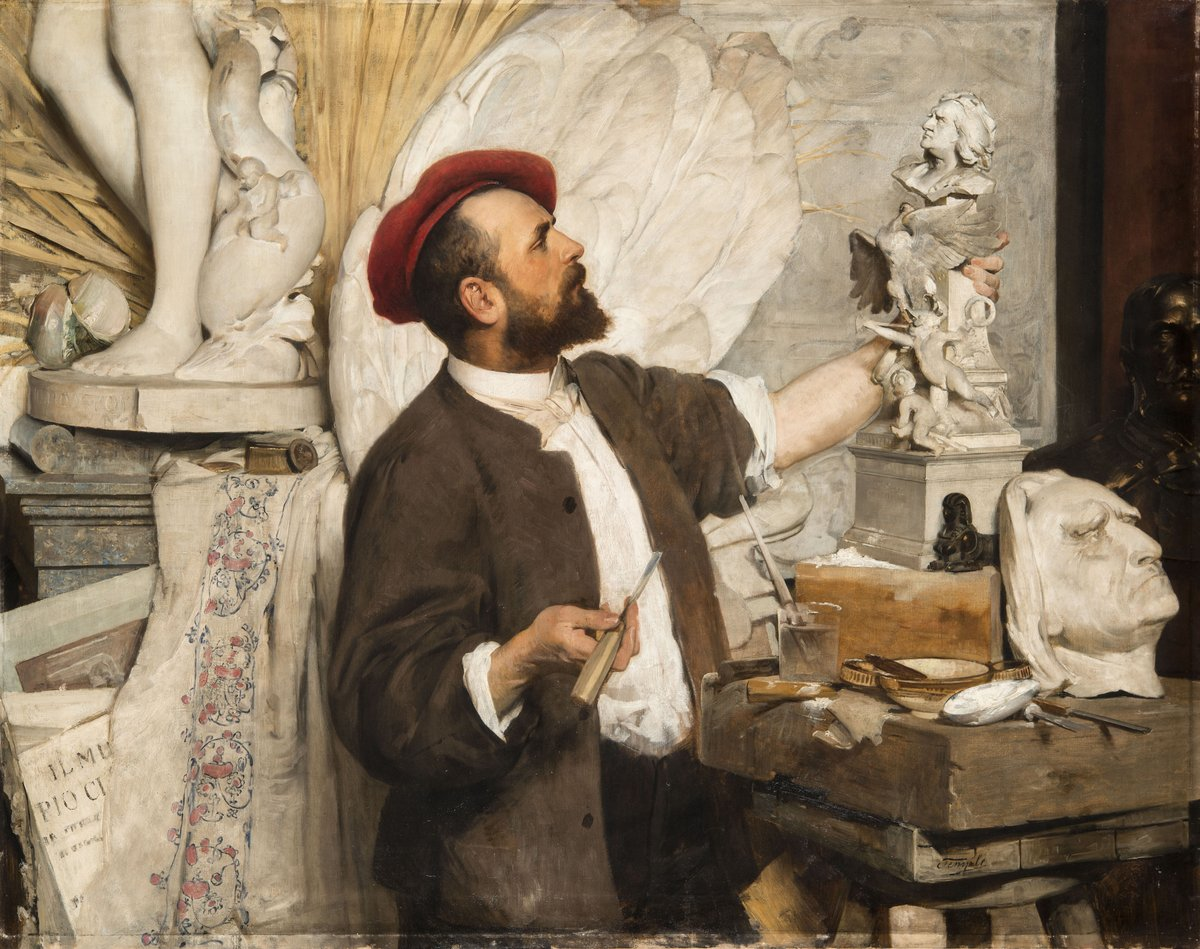
- Hans Temple: Alajos Stróbl at Work
- Born: Stróbl Alojs; 21 June 1856; Frischfeuer, Kingdom of Hungary (now Červený Kút, part of Hybe, Slovakia)
- Died: 13 December 1926 (aged 71); Budapest, Hungary
- Known for: Sculpture, painting

Alajos Stróbl (full name: Alajos János Vilmos Stróbl de Liptóujvár, Aloysius Joannes Vilhelmus Strobel) (21 June 1856 – 13 December 1926) was an Austro-Hungarian sculptor and artist of Zipser German origin (father Josef Strobl and mother Karolina Vyrostek). His work is characterised by sensitive realistic modelling and he became one of the most renowned sculptors of memorials in Hungary at the turn of the 20th century.

== Biography ==
Born on 21 June 1856 at Frischfeuer, Kingdom of Hungary (today Červený Kút, part of Hybe, near Kráľova Lehota, Slovakia, Kingdom of Hungary, Austrian Empire, Stróbl was a pupil of Kaspar von Zumbusch between 1876 and 1880. He was a young sculptor when his statue of Perseus (1882) gained him widespread attention in Hungary.

He created two statues for the façade and two sitting figures (Erkel and Liszt) for the entrance of the Opera. From then on, he became the most popular sculptor in Hungary of memorials. He sculpted the figure of János Arany in the grounds of the Hungarian National Museum in 1893 and the Matthias Fountain in Buda Castle in 1904. Stróbl also made two funeral statues for the Hungarian branch of the Habsburg family which are in the Palatinal Crypt of Buda Castle.

In 1906 he sculpted the equestrian statue of St. Stephen in the Fischer Bastion. That same year, he also completed the Semmelweis Memorial, which is now featured at the Rókus Hospital.

In collaboration with Kálmán Gerster, Stróbl produced statues for the Kossuth Mausoleum in 1907 and the Elizabeth Memorial. The statue of János Arany which was erected by Stróbl in 1910 can be now be seen in Nagykörös. The works of the Szécheny Memorial completed in 1914 lie in the city of Szeged. He also created a World War I memorial apotheosis of Károly Lotz, which is displayed in Stansted, England. His works of the 1920s such as the statue of Jókai (1921), the composition Reading Girls (1921), the Sándor Károlyi Memorial and the busts of József Eötvös and János Arany now stand in prominent public places in Budapest.

Alajos Stróbl also created a great number of impressionist portraits (Self Portrait at Young Age, 1878, Young Woman, 1916–1918, Szinyei Merse, 1919 and many others. Our Mother, one of his major works, won him the Grand Prix Award at the World Exhibition in Paris.

For a great deal of his career, Stróbl taught at the Hungarian Art School, now the Hungarian University of Fine Arts, and his influence was highly significant for Hungarian art during this period.

He died in Budapest on 13 December 1926.

== Selected works ==
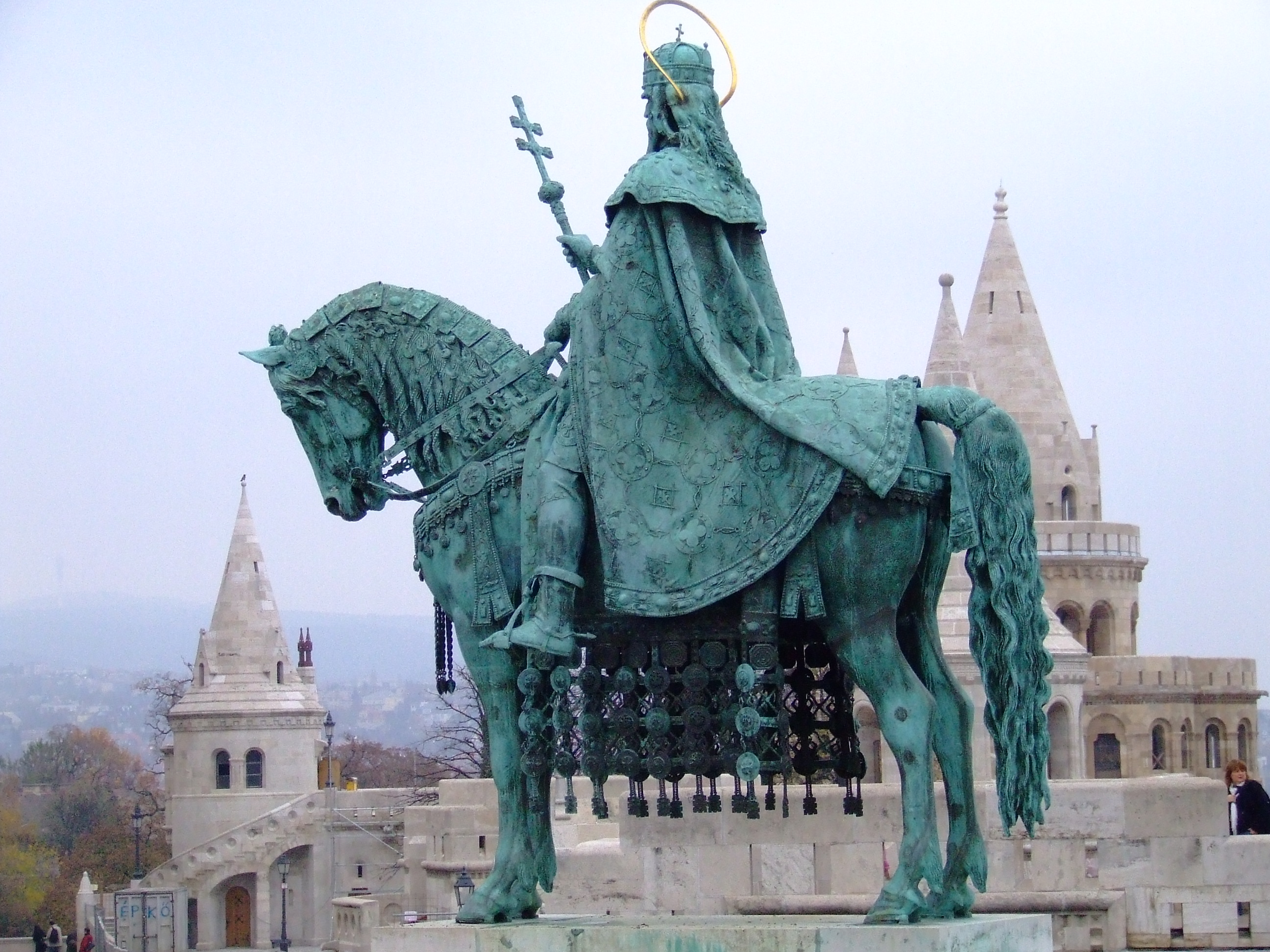
Sculpture of King Saint Stephen of Hungary, standing on the Buda Castle, at Fishermen Bastion

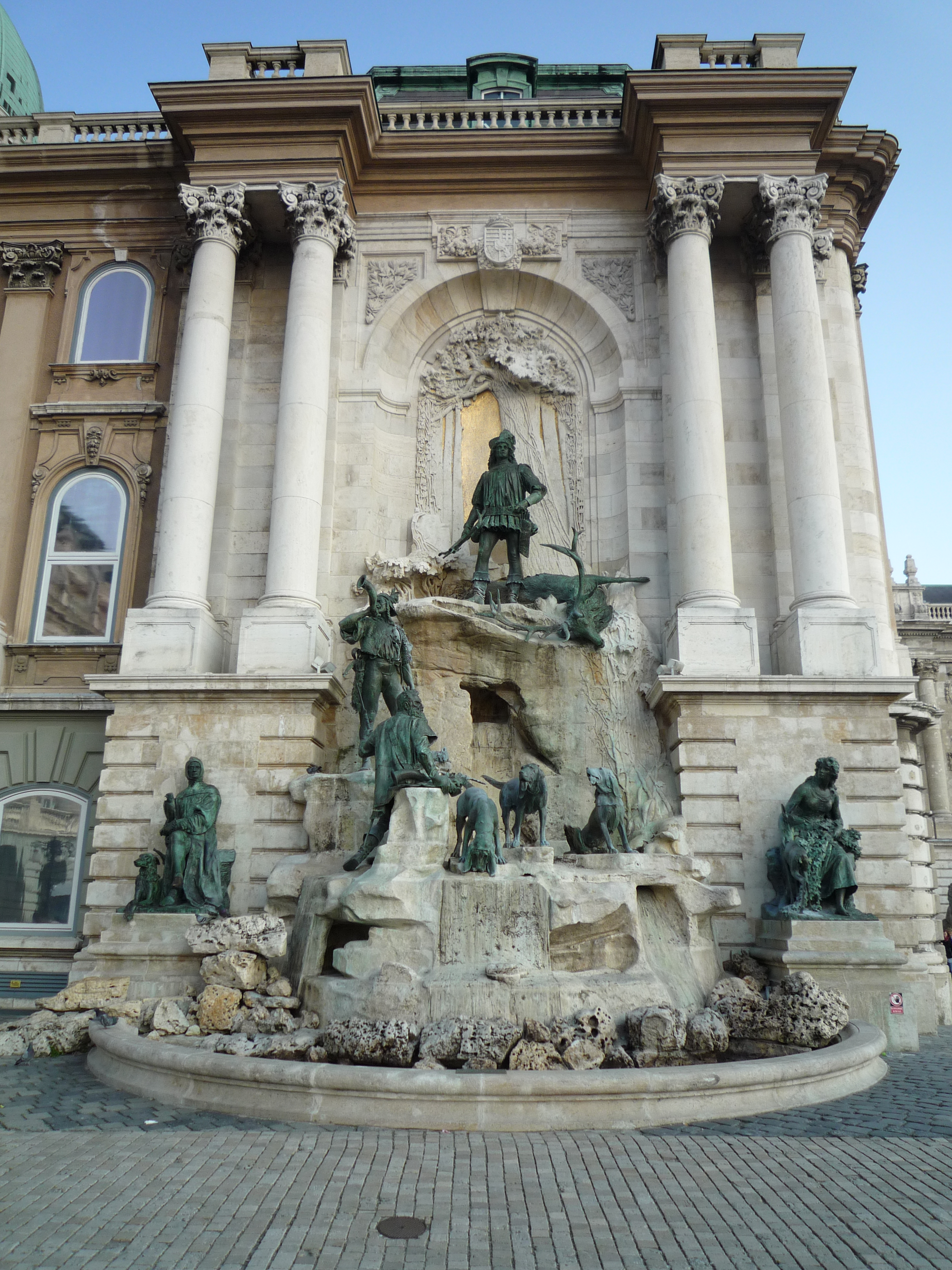
Matthias Fountain in Buda Castle, Budapest

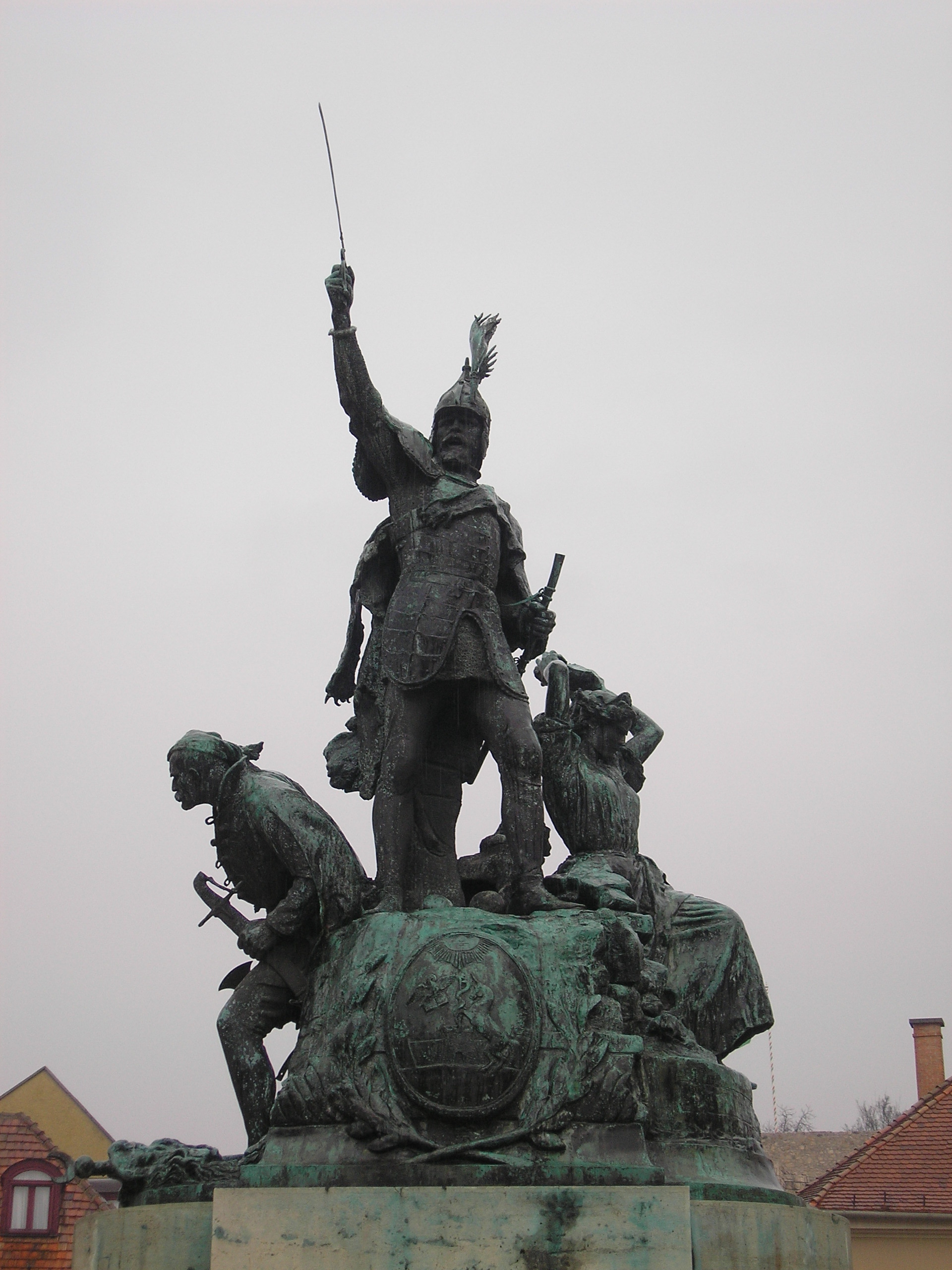
Sculpture of István Dobó, The hero of Eger, who defended the Eger castle in the Turkish wars in 1552

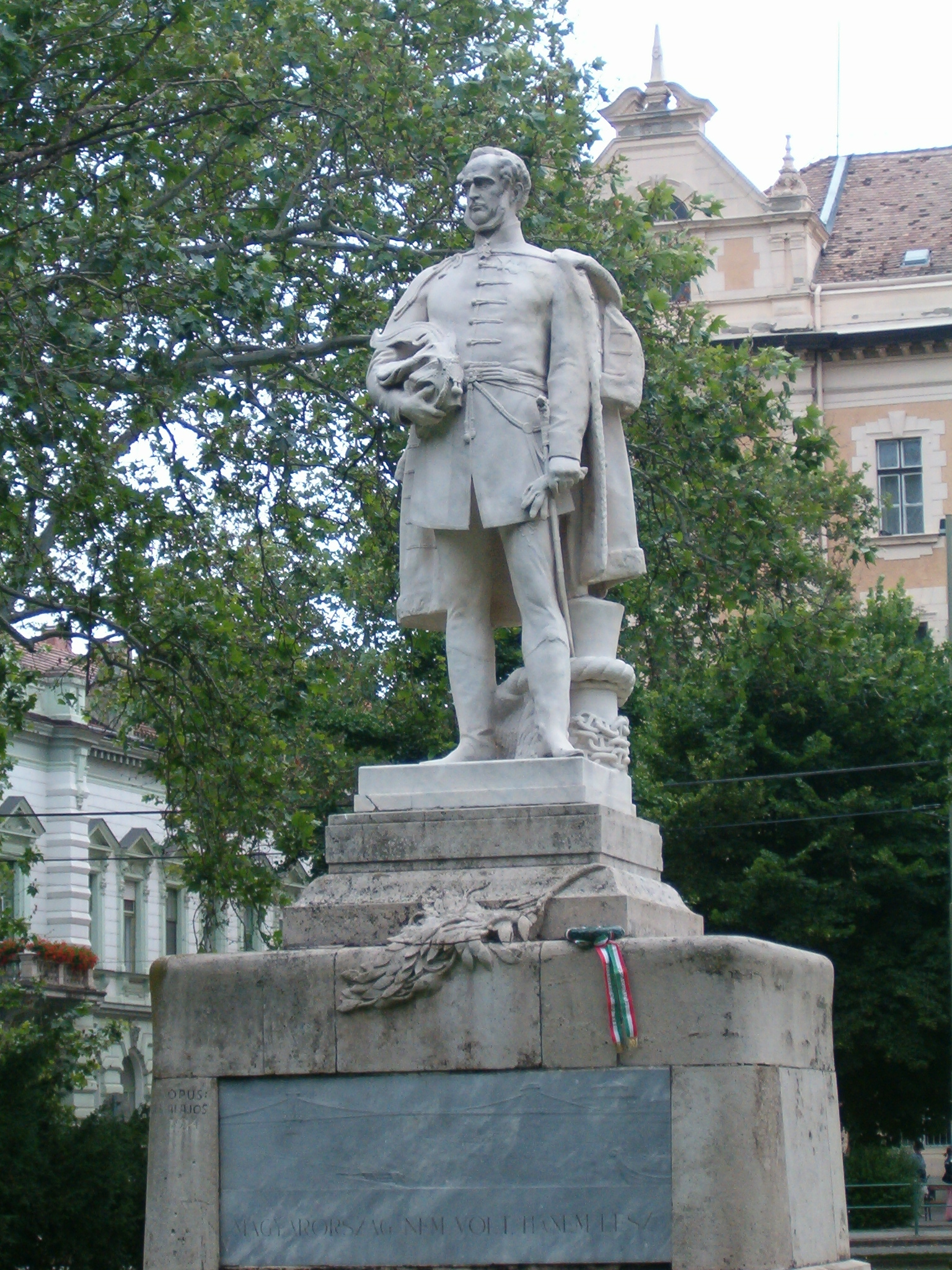
Sculpture of István Széchenyi in Szeged

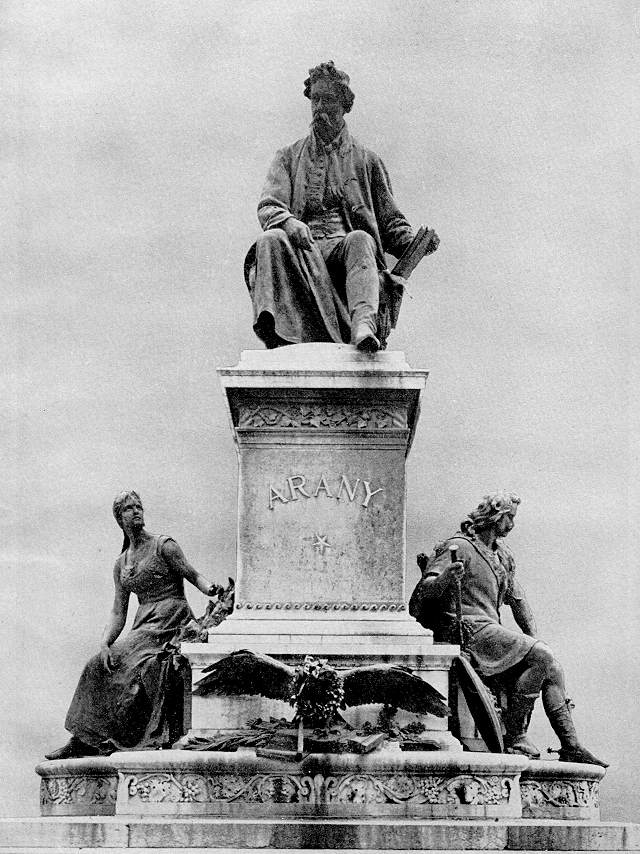
Monument to poet János Arany, in garden of the Hungarian National Museum, Budapest

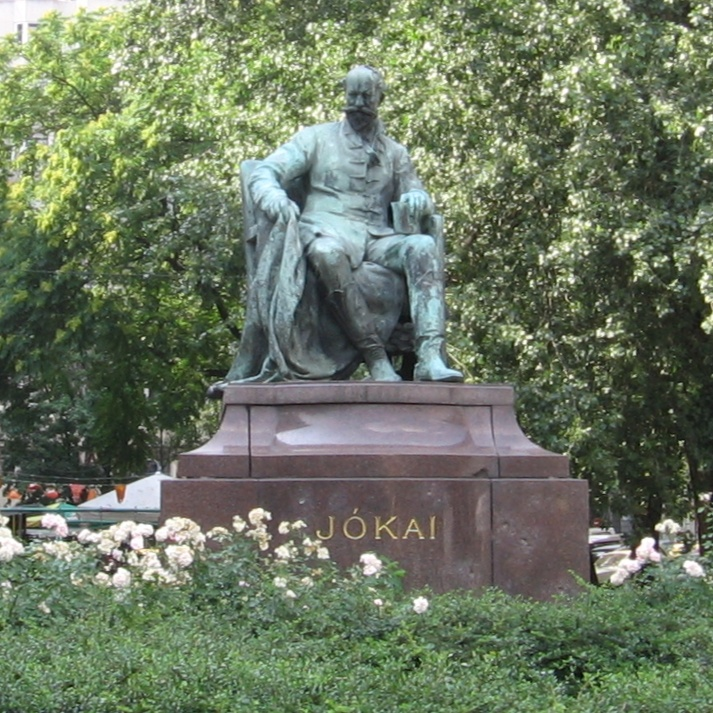
Sculpture of Mór Jókai, world-famous novelist, in Budapest

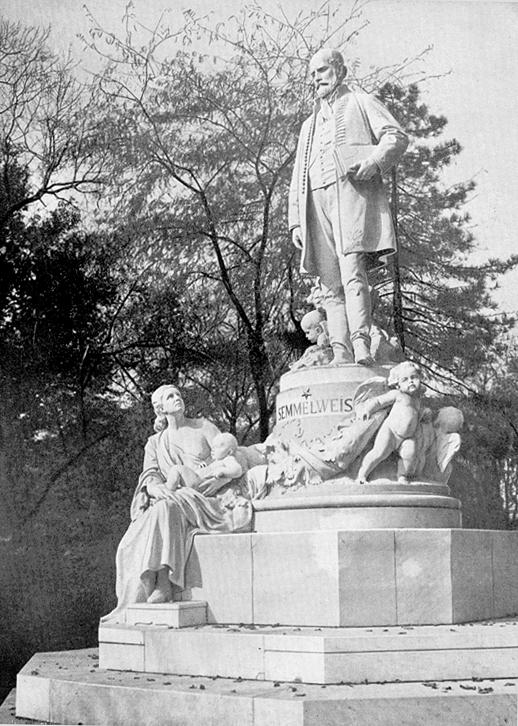
Monument of Ignaz Semmelweis, in Budapest

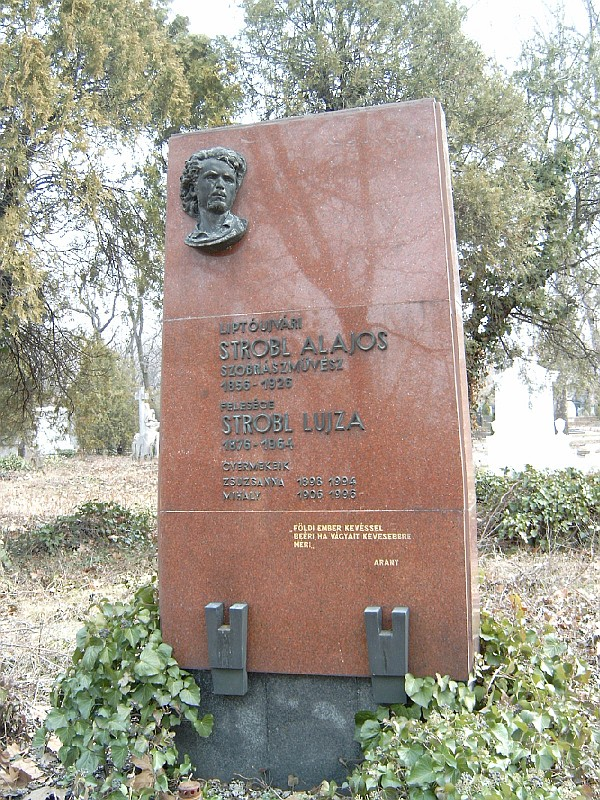
Tomb of Alajos Stróbl by Alajos Stróbl in Kerepesi Cemetery, Budapest

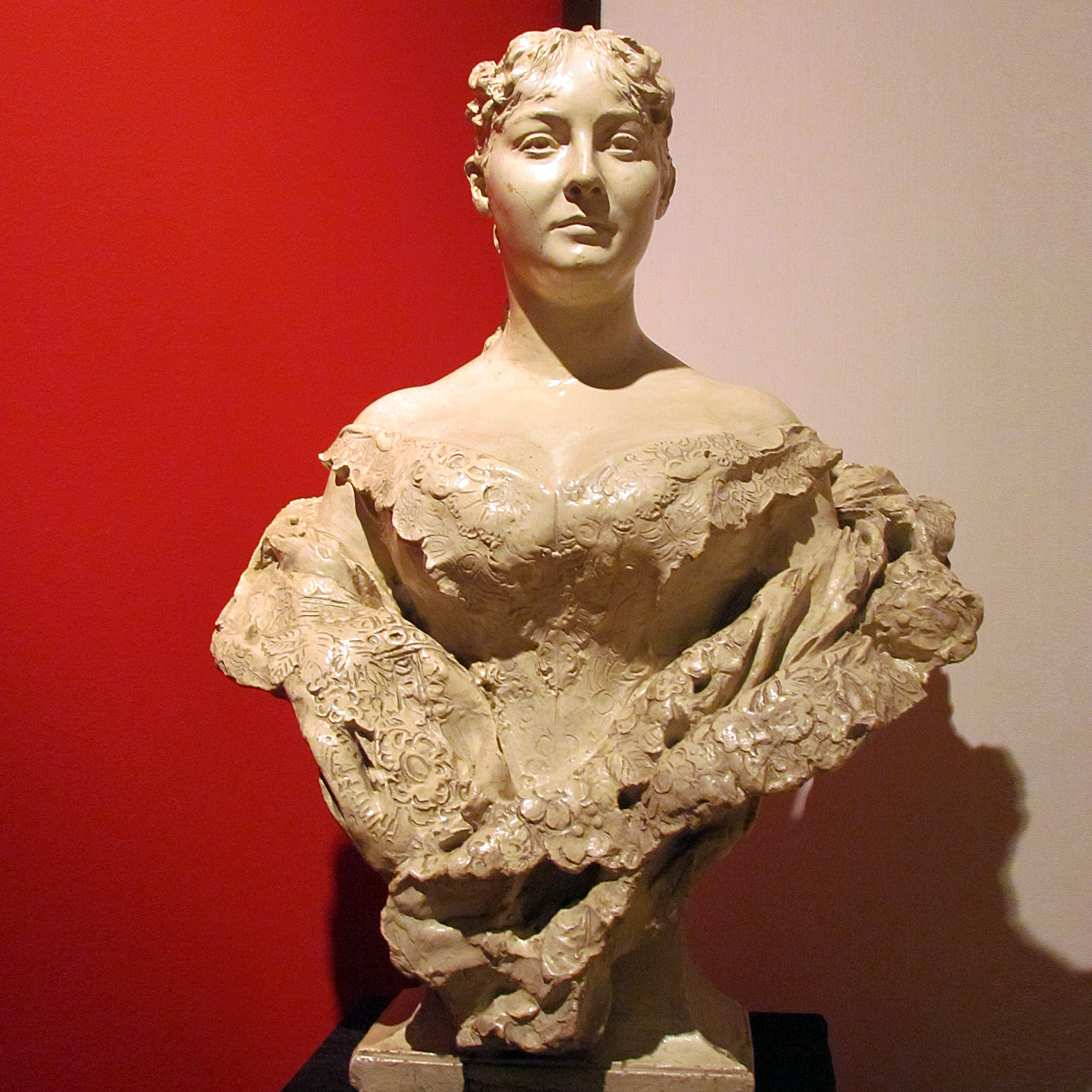
Bust of Natalija Obrenović Queen of Serbia, plaster, Historical Museum of Serbia
