= Hans Temple =

Moravian-Austrian painter (1857–1931)

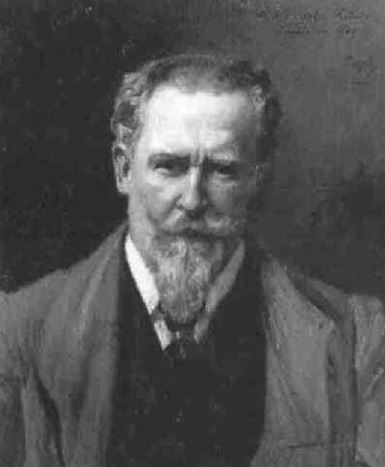
Self-portrait (1911)

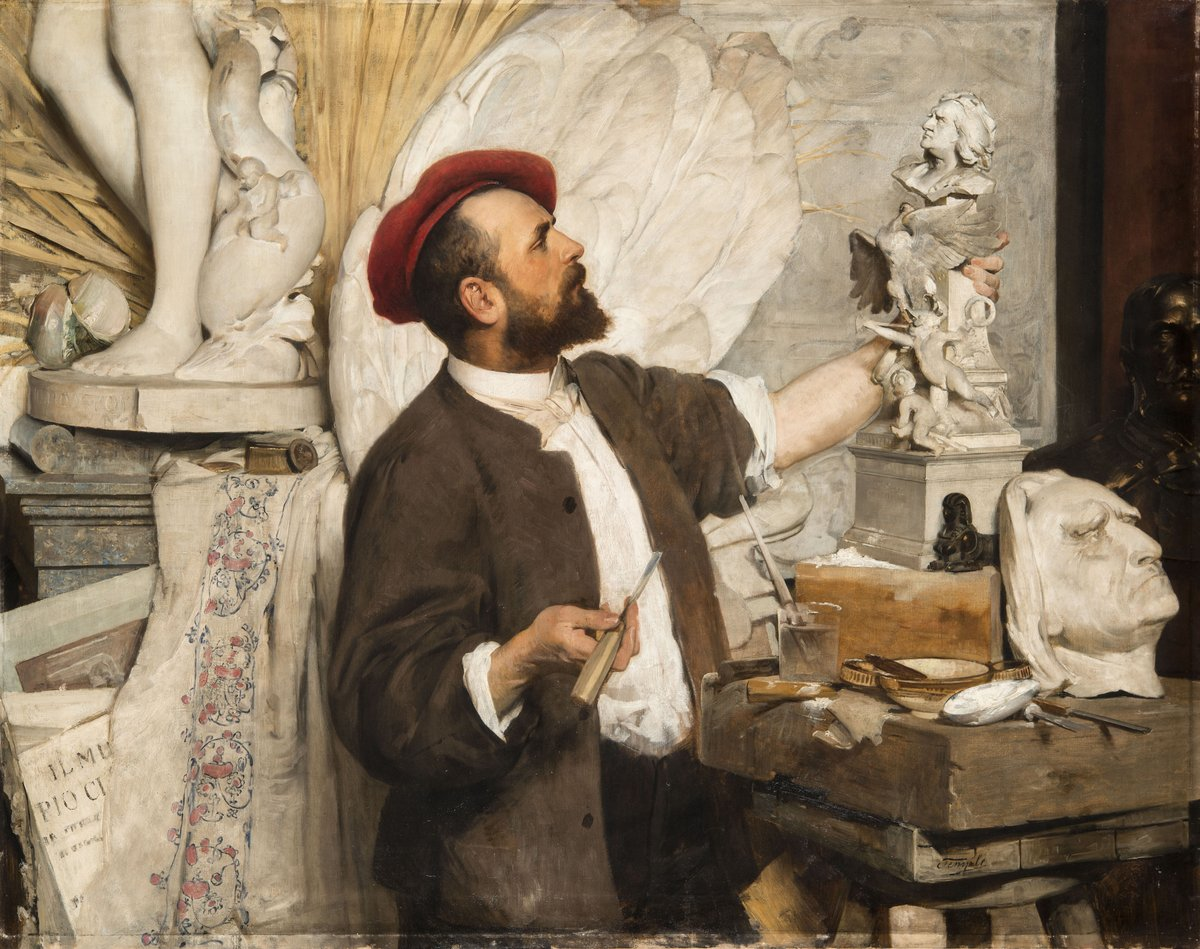
The Sculptor, Alajos Stróbl, at Work

Hans Temple (7 July 1857, Littau – 2 December 1931, Vienna) was a Moravian-Austrian portrait and genre painter.

== Life and work ==
He began his studies at the Academy of Fine Arts, Vienna, where his primary instructors were Hans Canon and Heinrich von Angeli. In 1885, he married Elisabeth Emma Kraft (1856–1913), and Canon was his best man. Later, he went to Paris and worked with Mihály Munkácsy for two years. After establishing his own studio, he became known for painting portraits of other artists in their studios. His two most familiar works of this type show Munkácsy at work on "Christ before Pilate", and the sculptor, Viktor Tilgner, working on his monument of Mozart, for the Vienna Burggarten.

In 1896, he was awarded a small gold medal at the Große Berliner Kunstausstellung. In 1898, he received a major commission from Princess Alexandrine of Baden, for a depiction of the celebrations which occurred on the occasion of her wedding to Ernest II, Duke of Saxe-Coburg and Gotha, in 1842, at Karlsruhe Palace. The completed painting contained thirty-four detailed portrait figures.

He also received commissions directly from the Viennese Court; which included works honoring those who served in hospitals during World War I, and for the 85th birthday celebrations of Kaiser Franz Joseph I. Shortly after the beginning of the war, he married a second time; to Elsa Wilhelmine Mayer (1876–1962)

He died at the age of seventy-four, and was interred at the Vienna Central Cemetery. A street in Vienna's Liesing district was named after him in 1959.

== Sources ==
- "Temple, Hans", In: Allgemeines Lexikon der Bildenden Künstler von der Antike bis zur Gegenwart, Vol. 32: Stephens–Theodotos, E. A. Seemann, Leipzig 1938
- Robert Janás: "Hans Temple. Ein Beitrag zur Geschichte der deutschmährischen Malerei des 19. Jahrhunderts", In: Opuscula historiae artium. Folio 43. ISSN 1211-7390, Brno 1999, pp.37–47
- Biography of Temple @ the Wien Geschichte Wiki
