= Olbramice (Olomouc District) =

- Municipality
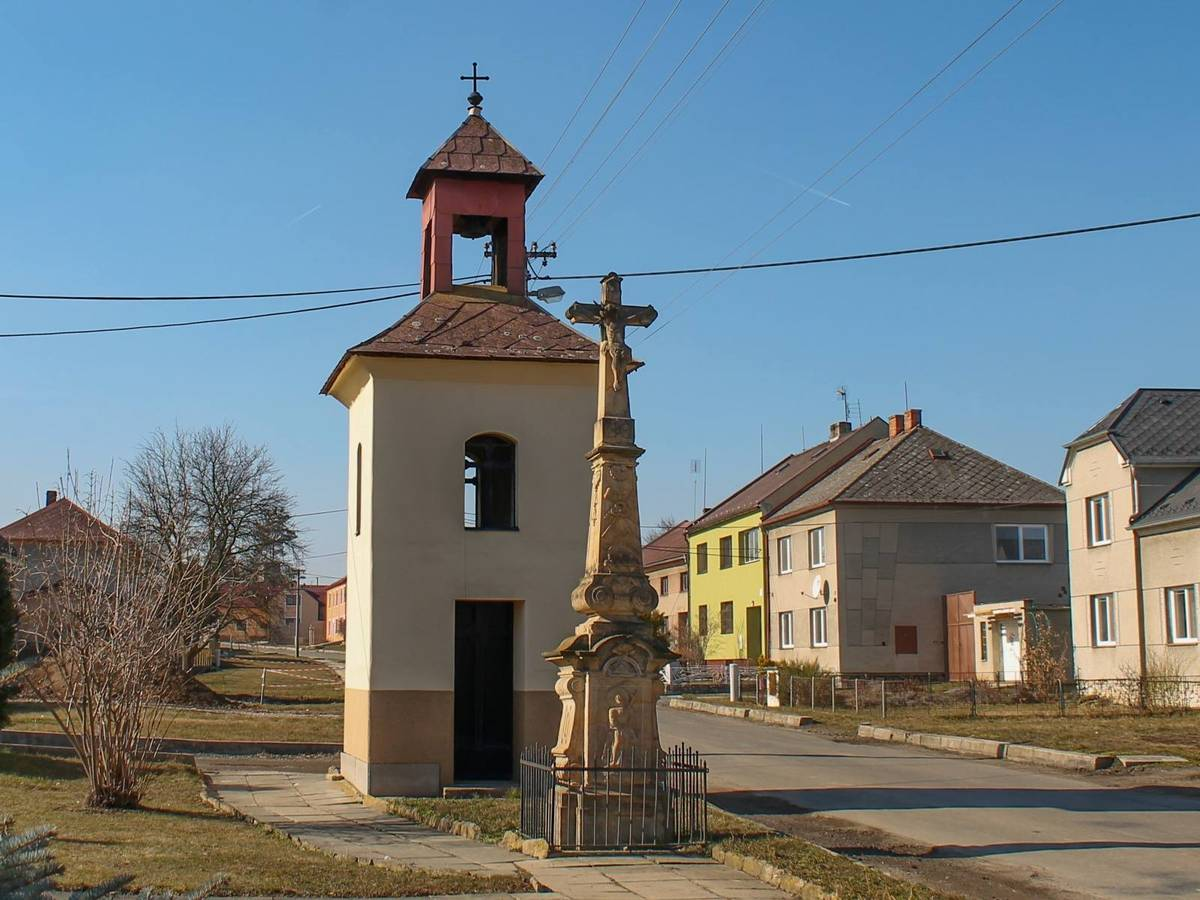
- Belfry and cross in the centre of Olbramice

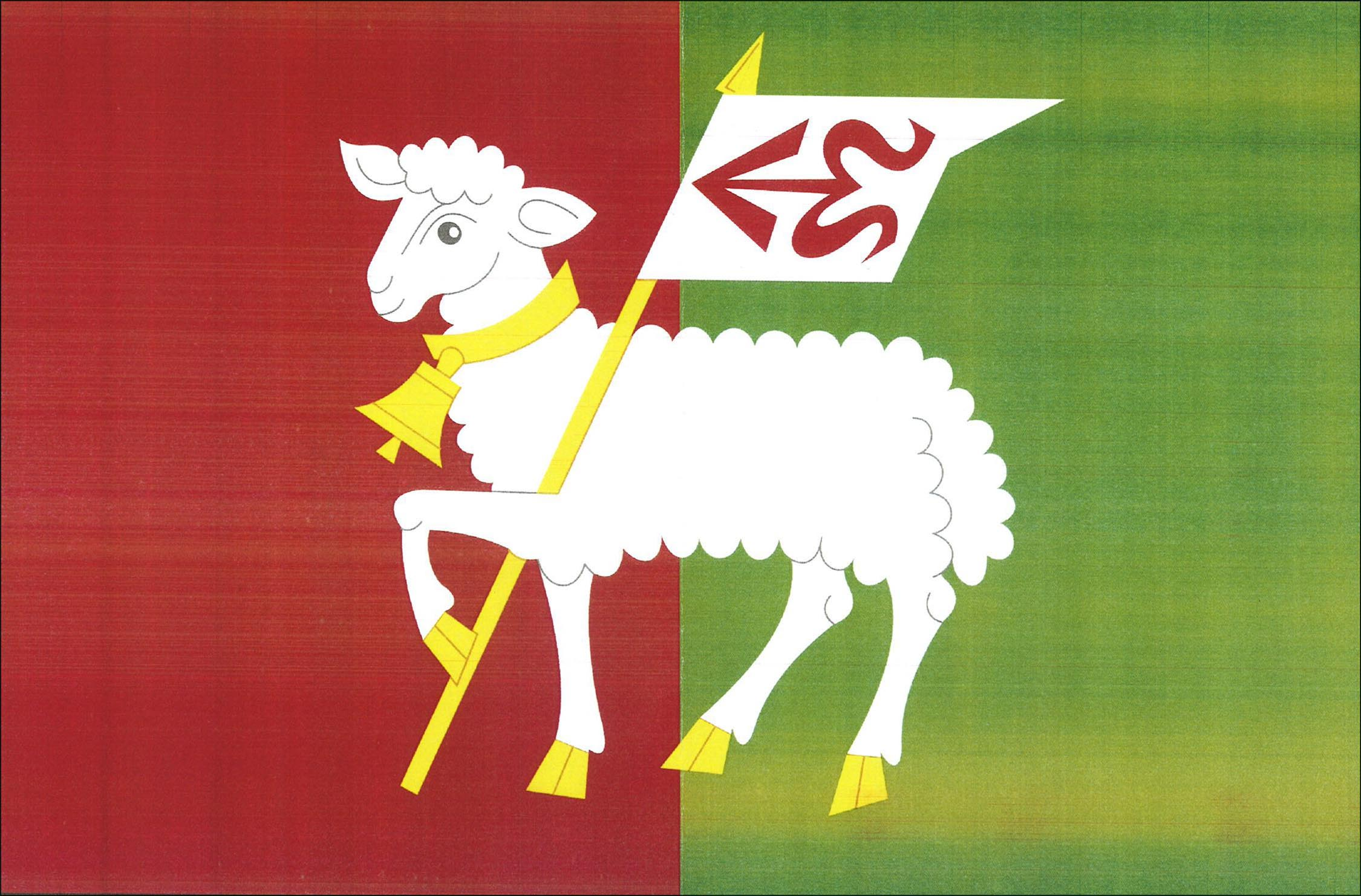
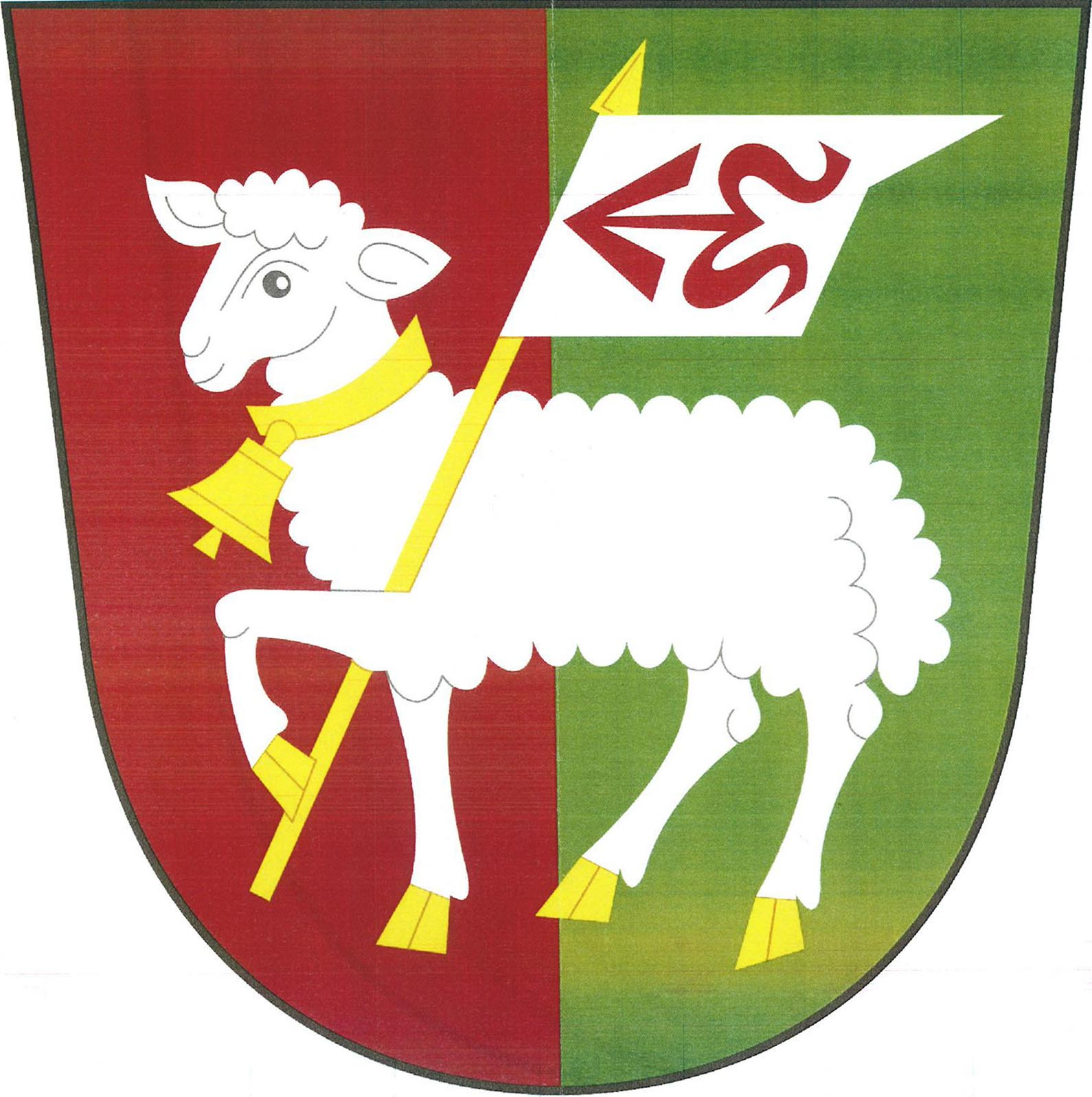
- Flag Coat of arms

- Location in the Czech Republic
- Coordinates: 49°36′49″N 17°0′5″E
- Country: Czech Republic
- Region: Olomouc
- District: Olomouc
- First mentioned: 1376

Area
  - Total: 3.05 km^{2} (1.18 sq mi)
- Elevation: 394 m (1,293 ft)

Population (2026-01-01)
  - Total: 219
  - Density: 71.8/km^{2} (186/sq mi)
- Time zone: UTC+1 (CET)
  - Summer (DST): UTC+2 (CEST)
- Postal code: 783 22
- Website: www.olbramice.cz

Olbramice is a municipality and village in Olomouc District in the Olomouc Region of the Czech Republic. It has about 200 inhabitants.

== Etymology ==
The name is derived from the personal name Olbram, meaning "the village of Olbram's people".

== Geography ==
Olbramice is located about 18 kilometres (11 mi) west of Olomouc. It lies in the Zábřeh Highlands. The highest point is at 444 m (1,457 ft) above sea level.

== History ==
The first written mention of Olbramice is in a document written between 1368 and 1376. From 1589 until the establishment of an independent municipality in 1850, it was part of the Chudobín estate.

== Demographics ==
Historical population

Year	Pop.	±%
1869	233	—
1880	254	+9.0%
1890	306	+20.5%
1900	309	+1.0%
1910	325	+5.2%

Year	Pop.	±%
1921	333	+2.5%
1930	297	−10.8%
1950	255	−14.1%
1961	257	+0.8%
1970	226	−12.1%

Year	Pop.	±%
1980	250	+10.6%
1991	241	−3.6%
2001	221	−8.3%
2011	224	+1.4%
2021	220	−1.8%

Source: Censuses

== Transport ==
There are no railways or major roads passing through the municipal territory.

== Sights ==
The only protected cultural monuments in the municipality are a column with a statue of St. John of Nepomuk from the mid-19th century and an Empire cross dating from 1821. Next to the cross is a belfry. In the centre of Olbramice is the Chapel of Saint Vitus, built in 1937.
