= Litovel =

- Town
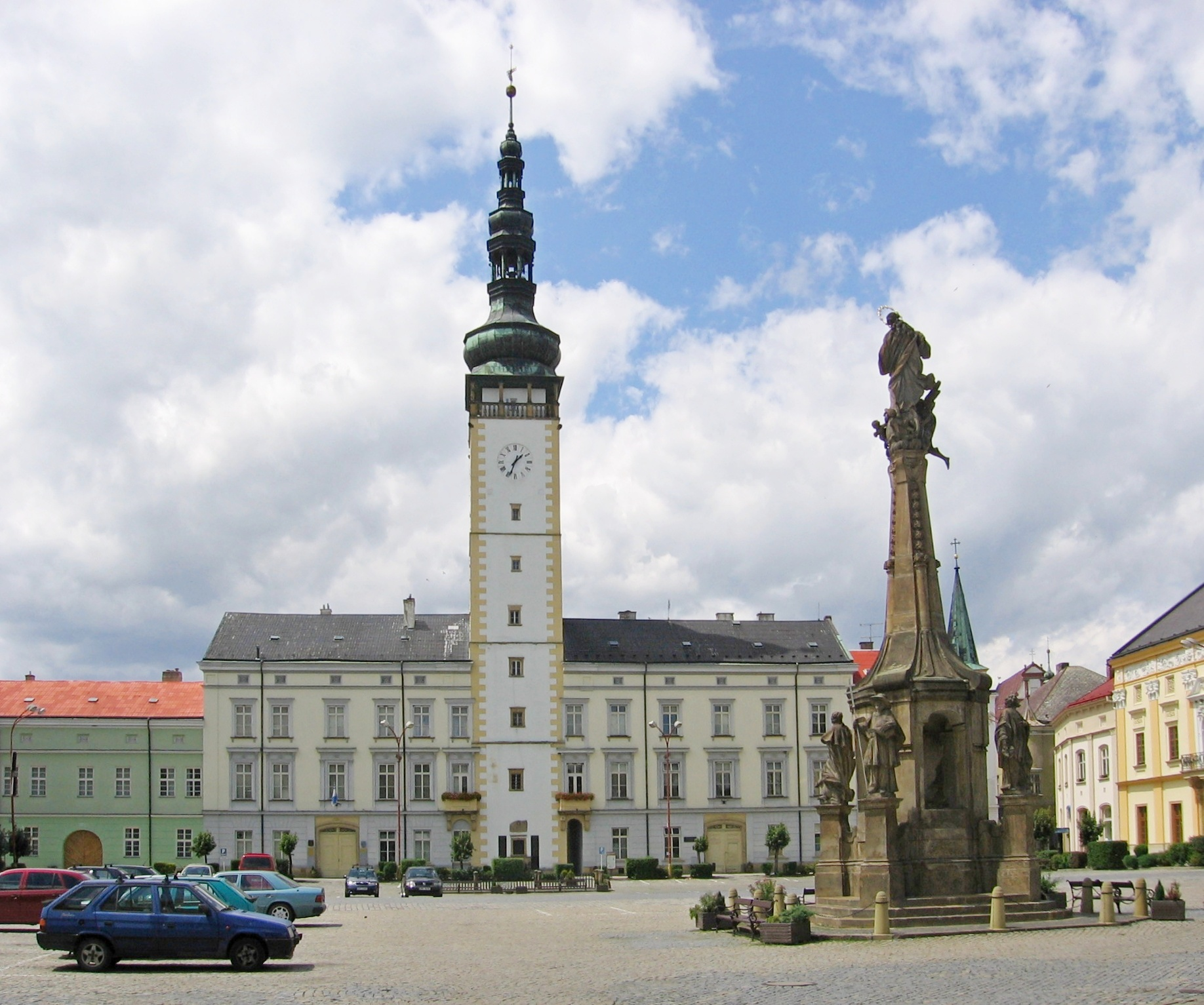
- The square Náměstí Přemysla Otakara II.

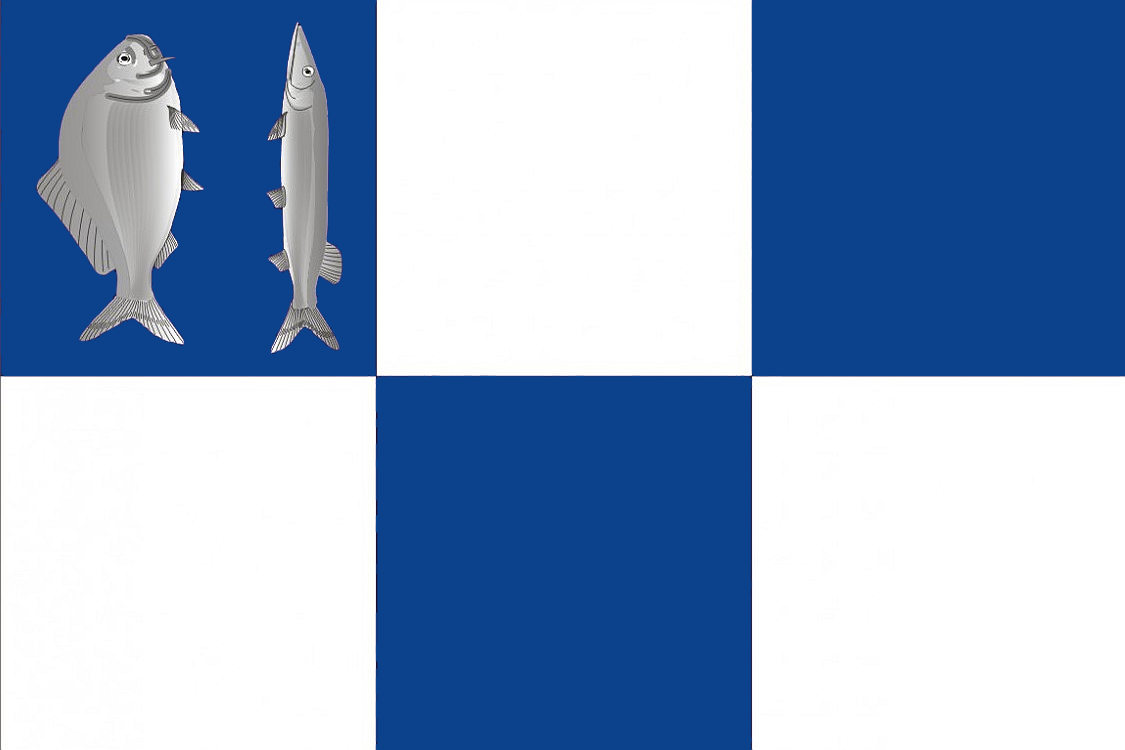
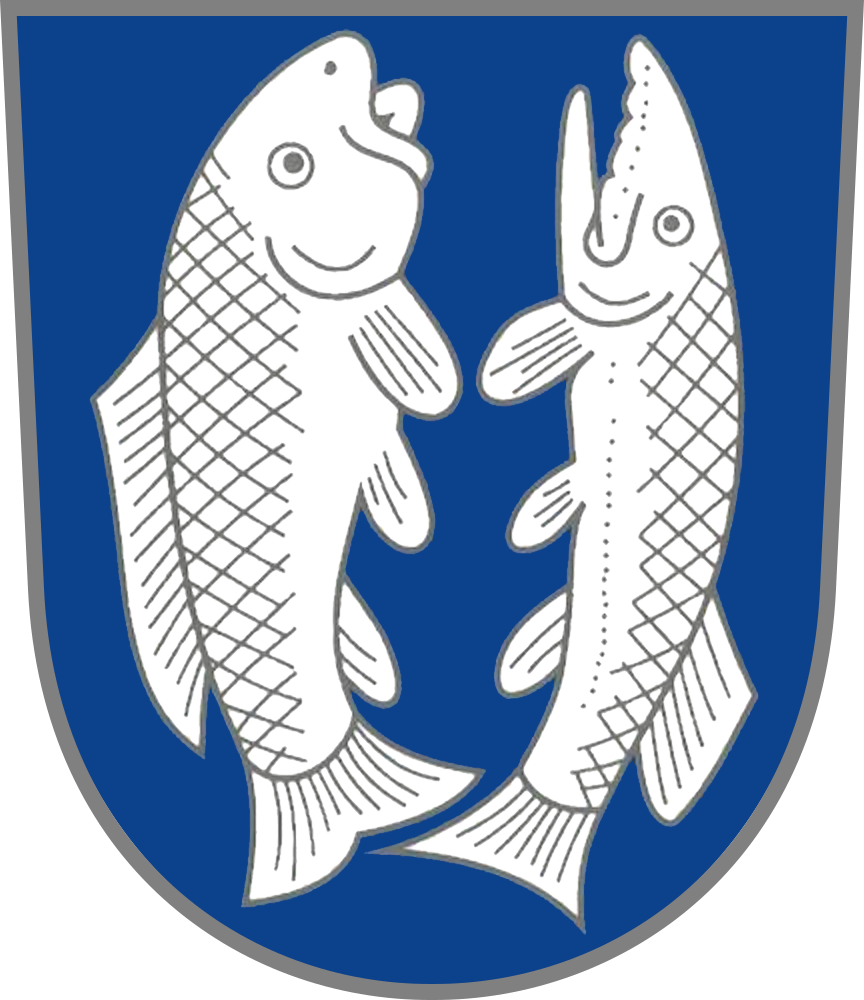
- Flag Coat of arms

- Location in the Czech Republic
- Coordinates: 49°42′4″N 17°4′34″E
- Country: Czech Republic
- Region: Olomouc
- District: Olomouc
- First mentioned: 1287

Government
  - Mayor: Viktor Kohout

Area
  - Total: 46.40 km^{2} (17.92 sq mi)
- Elevation: 233 m (764 ft)

Population (2026-01-01)
  - Total: 9,448
  - Density: 203.6/km^{2} (527.4/sq mi)
- Time zone: UTC+1 (CET)
  - Summer (DST): UTC+2 (CEST)
- Postal code: 784 01
- Website: www.litovel.eu

Litovel (Czech pronunciation: [ˈlɪtovɛl]; German: Littau) is a town in Olomouc District in the Olomouc Region of the Czech Republic. It has about 9,400 inhabitants. The town is located in the Upper Morava Valley on the Morava River and its branches. It has a tradition in the food industry and brewing.

Litovel was founded in the 1250s. The historic town centre is well preserved and is protected as an urban monument zone. The most important monuments are the town hall and the stone bridge, which is the oldest preserved bridge in Moravia.

== Administrative division ==
Litovel consists of 11 municipal parts (in brackets population according to the 2021 census):

- Litovel (6,910)
- Březové (205)
- Chudobín (213)
- Myslechovice (394)
- Nasobůrky (438)
- Nová Ves (204)
- Rozvadovice (243)
- Savín (129)
- Tři Dvory (254)
- Unčovice (378)
- Víska (91)

== Etymology ==
In Old Czech the town's name was written as Ľutovel. The name was probably derived from the personal name Ľutov.

== Geography ==
Litovel is located about 16 kilometres (10 mi) northwest of Olomouc. It lies in a flat agricultural landscape in the Upper Morava Valley lowland. The highest point is the hill Šumina at 418 m (1,371 ft) above sea level. The Morava River and six its branches flow through the town, which gave it the nickname "Moravian Venice".

The northern part of the municipal territory lies in the Litovelské Pomoraví Protected Landscape Area, named after the town.

== History ==
Map of Litovel (c. 1760)

The first written mention of Litovel is from 1287, older documents have been proven to be forgeries. The town was founded between 1252 and 1256 by King Ottokar II.

In 1327, King John of Bohemia allowed the town to build walls. The royal town developed until the Hussite Wars. After the war, Litovel asked for the assignment of a protector and came under the protection of the Vlašim family from Úsov. In the 16th century, the Lords of Boskovice acquired the Úsov estate, Litovel became their property and lost its status of a royal town.

In the early 17th century, Litovel was acquired by the Liechtenstein family and lost its significance. The town was further affected by the Thirty Years' War, during which was plundered by the Swedish army, and by plague epidemics.

In 1850, Litovel became a district town and began to grow with the influx of inhabitants from the surroundings. The Czech population began to prevail over the German, and the town became a centre of Czech culture and education. At the beginning of the 20th century, trade and industry began to develop rapidly, and new factories for processing agricultural products were established.

== Demographics ==
Historical population

Year	Pop.	±%
1869	6,254	—
1880	7,403	+18.4%
1890	7,743	+4.6%
1900	8,127	+5.0%
1910	8,189	+0.8%

Year	Pop.	±%
1921	8,240	+0.6%
1930	8,041	−2.4%
1950	7,438	−7.5%
1961	8,489	+14.1%
1970	9,019	+6.2%

Year	Pop.	±%
1980	10,123	+12.2%
1991	10,184	+0.6%
2001	10,030	−1.5%
2011	9,719	−3.1%
2021	9,459	−2.7%

Source: Censuses

== Economy ==
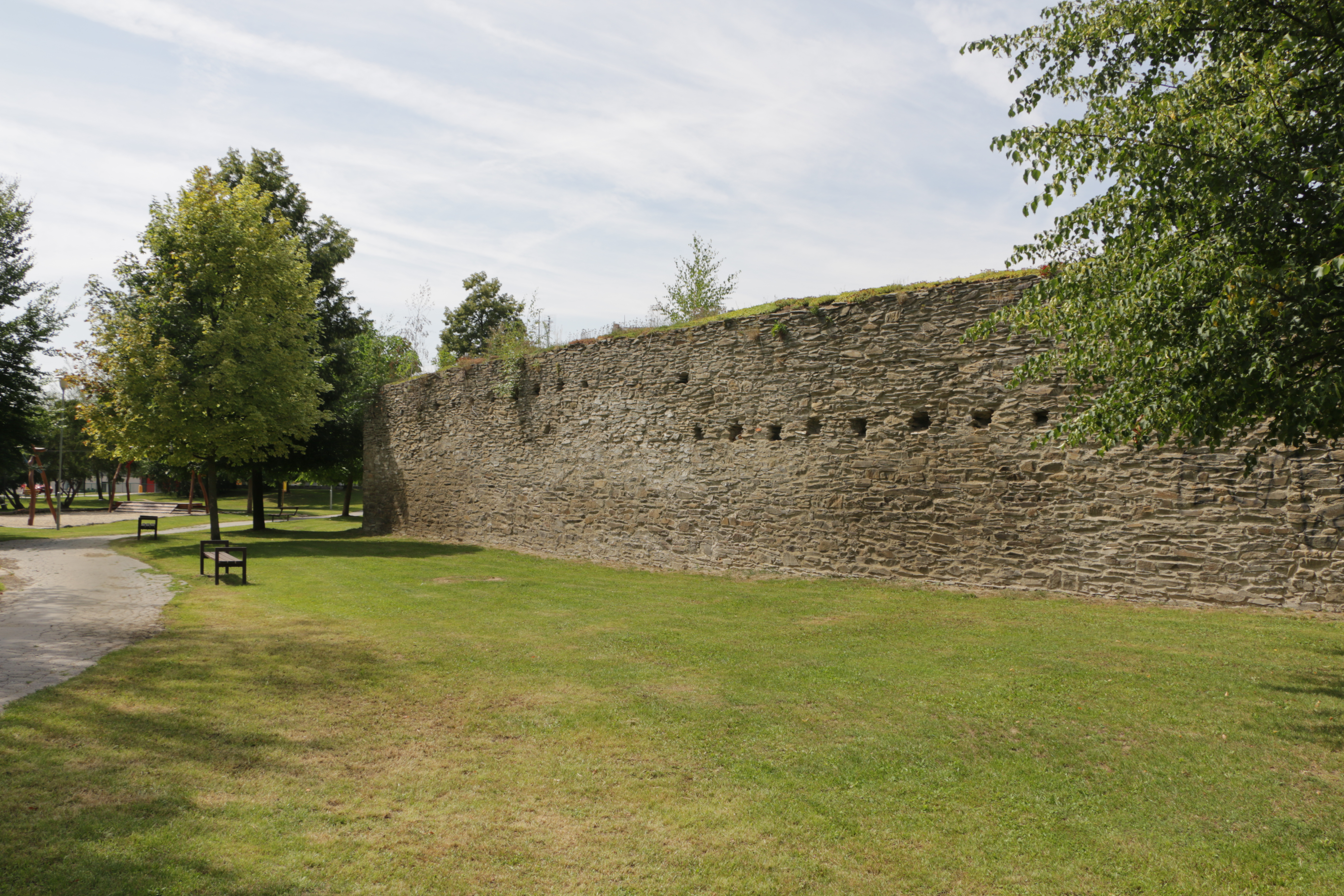
A park with remnants of the town walls

Litovel is known especially for the food industry. In the village of Tři Dvory is located a factory of Adriana, a manufacturer of pasta, and Brazzale, a cheese-producing company which has here one of the largest hard-cheese producing factories in the world.

Litovel is also known for its brewery. The tradition of brewing beer here began in 1297.

Pro-Ject brand turntables and audio equipment are manufactured in Litovel.

== Transport ==
The D35 motorway (part of the European route E442) from Olomouc to the Hradec Králové Region runs through the town.

Litovel is located on the railway line Prostějov–Červenka. The town is served by three train stations: Litovel, Litovel město and Litovel předměstí.

== Sights ==
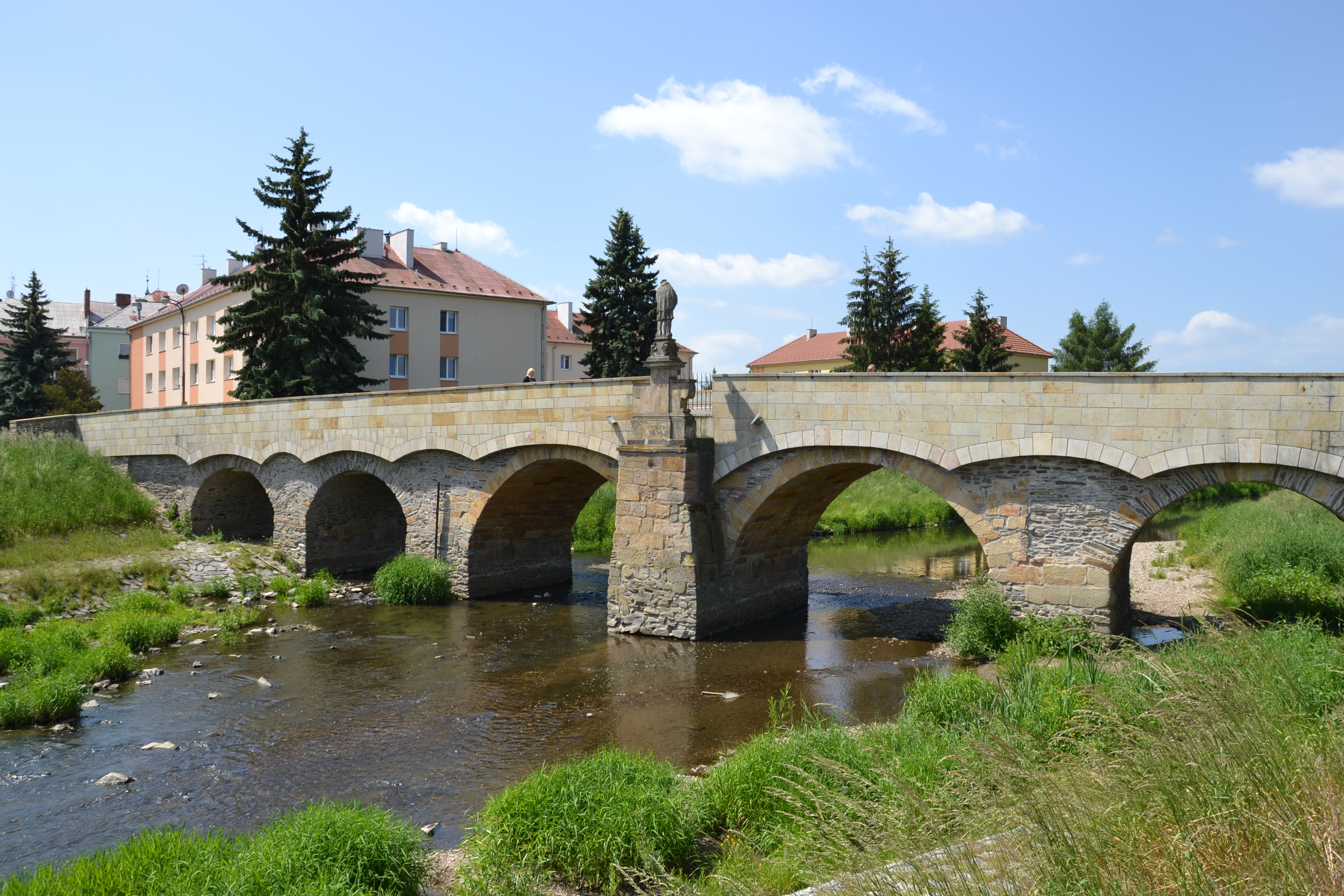
The bridge Svatojánský most

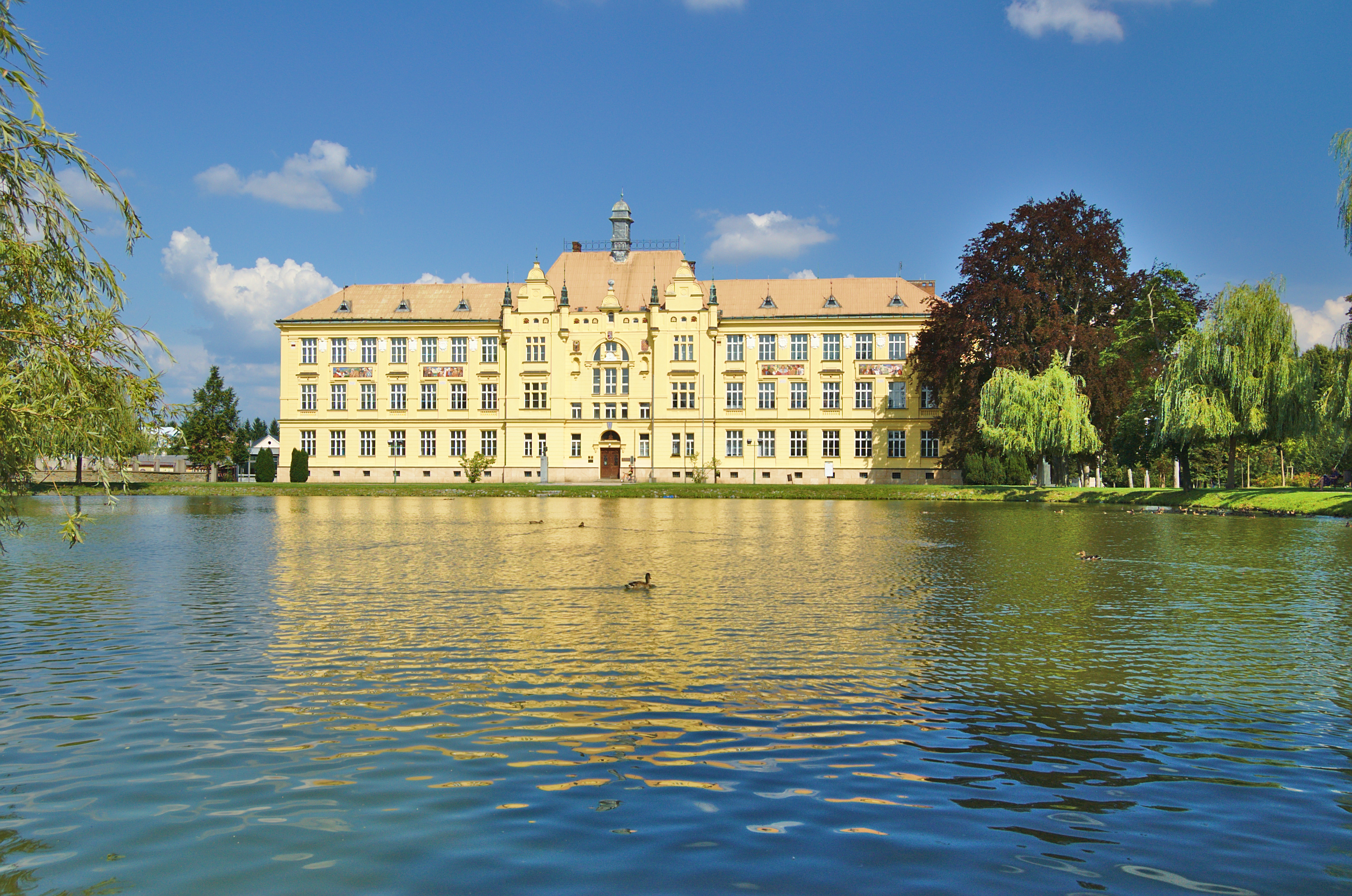
Gymnasium of Jan Opletal

The historic town centre is formed by the square Náměstí Přemysla Otakara II. and its surroundings. It was delimited by the Morava and its branches, and by town walls, which remnants are preserved. The main landmark of the town square is the town hall. It was originally a manor house which was sold to the town in 1557. It was reconstructed in 1572 and modified in the Baroque style in 1724. The town hall tower, which is 65 metres (213 ft) tall, was built right over the Nečíz, one of many branches of the Morava that runs underneath the square.

The town square is lines by preserved burger houses. A plague column stands in the middle of the square. It was created in 1724. The pillar is decorated with seven statues of plaque patrons and The Holy Virgin on the top.

The bridge Svatojánský most ('bridge of Saint John') is a stone bridge over the Morava River. It was constructed in 1592, which makes it the third oldest preserved bridge in the country (and the oldest stone bridge in Moravia).

A notable building is the Gymnasium of Jan Opletal. The Neorenaissance school building, named after Jan Opletal, comes from 1901 and is decorated with four ceramic mosaics designed by Jano Köhler, which depict scenes from the history of the town.

The Church of Saints Philip and James is the probably the oldest church in Litovel. Its existence was first mentioned in 1342. It was completely rebuilt after in the early Baroque style in 1692–1694.

The Church of Saint Mark was originally a Gothic church, also first recorded in 1342. The extensive Renaissance reconstruction took place in 1529–1532. After the Thirty Years' War, it was modified in the Baroque style.

== Notable people ==
- Gustav Tschermak von Seysenegg (1836–1927), Austrian mineralogist
- Karl Kostersitz von Marenhorst (1839–1897), Austro-Hungarian general
- Marija Ružička Strozzi (1850–1937), Croatian actress
- Hans Temple (1857–1931), Czech-Austrian painter
- Gustav Frištenský (1879–1957), strongman and wrestler; lived and died here
- Henry Kulka (1900–1971), Czech-New Zealand architect
- Jan Čep (1902–1974), writer and translator
- Lubomír Šik (1928–2026), historian
- Přemysl Krbec (1940–2021), gymnast

== Twin towns – sister cities ==
Litovel is twinned with:

- Littau (Lucerne), Switzerland
- Revúca, Slovakia
- Wieliczka, Poland
