= Lužice (Olomouc District) =

- Municipality
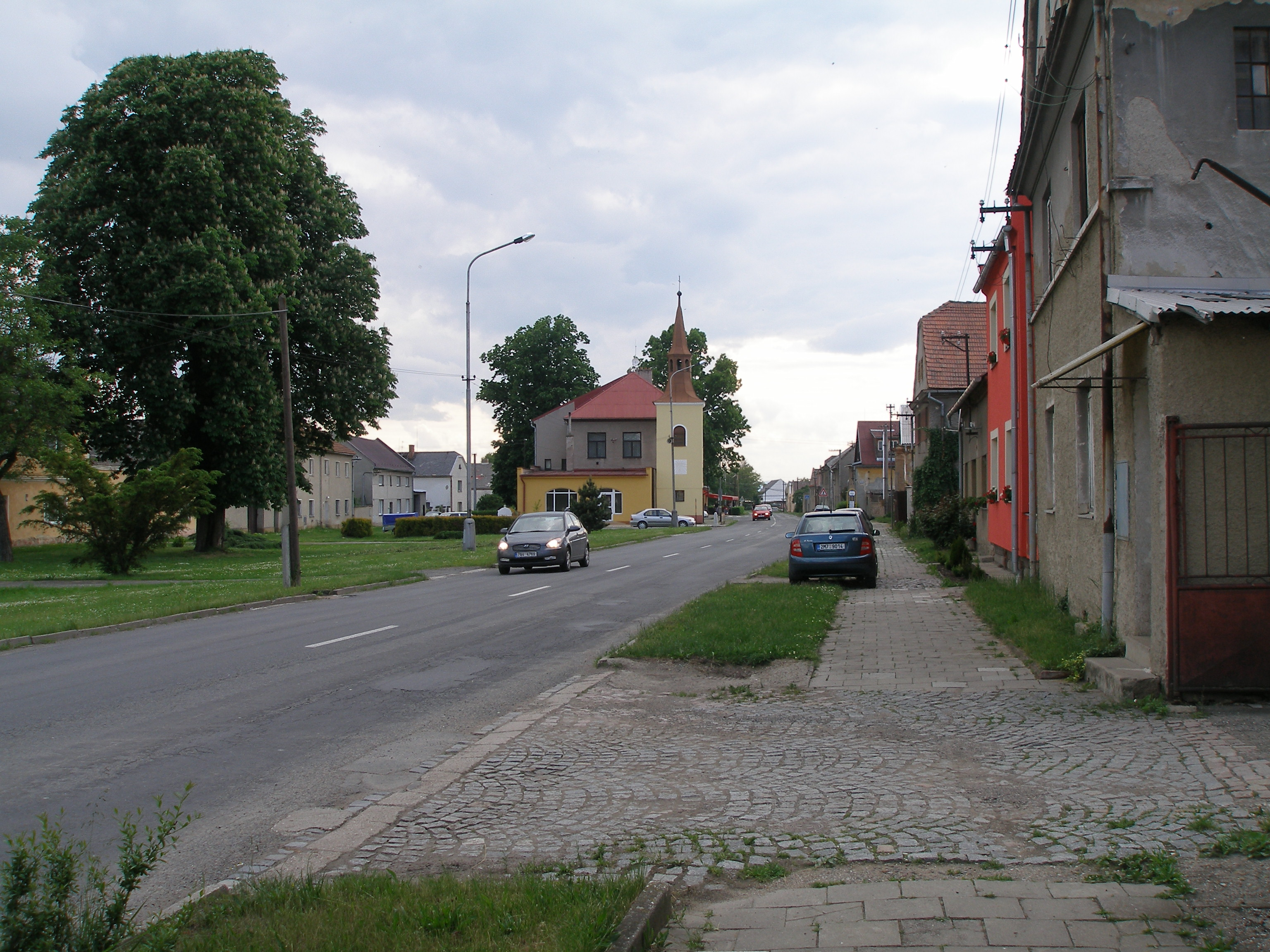
- Centre of Lužice

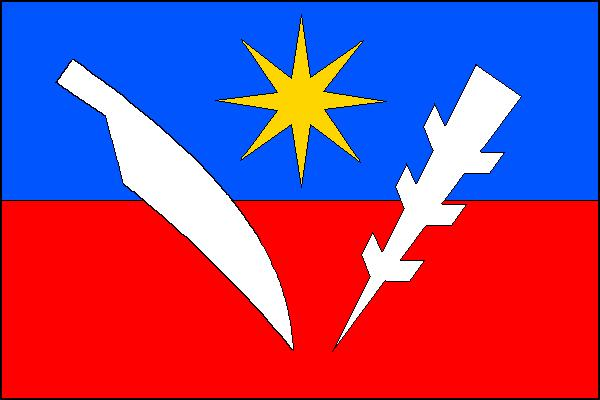
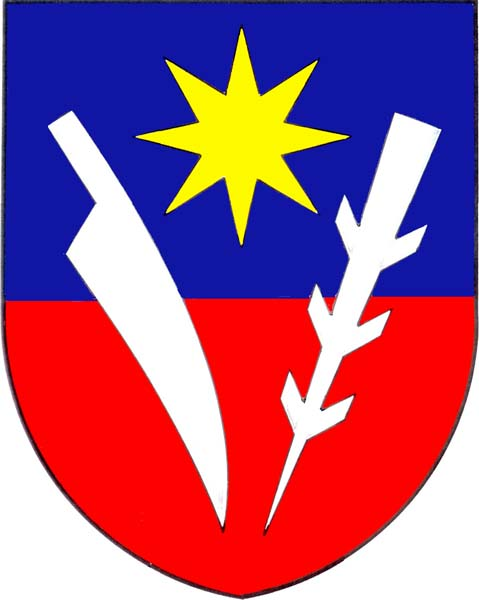
- Flag Coat of arms

- Location in the Czech Republic
- Coordinates: 49°42′57″N 17°15′35″E
- Country: Czech Republic
- Region: Olomouc
- District: Olomouc
- First mentioned: 1141

Area
  - Total: 5.15 km^{2} (1.99 sq mi)
- Elevation: 242 m (794 ft)

Population (2026-01-01)
  - Total: 409
  - Density: 79.4/km^{2} (206/sq mi)
- Time zone: UTC+1 (CET)
  - Summer (DST): UTC+2 (CEST)
- Postal code: 785 01
- Website: www.obecluzice.cz

Lužice (German: Luschitz) is a municipality and village in Olomouc District in the Olomouc Region of the Czech Republic. It has about 400 inhabitants.

Lužice lies approximately 14 kilometres (9 mi) north of Olomouc and 208 km (129 mi) east of Prague.

== Demographics ==
Historical population
Year	Pop.	±%
1869	386	—
1880	421	+9.1%
1890	508	+20.7%
1900	484	−4.7%
1910	427	−11.8%
1921	549	+28.6%
1930	555	+1.1%
1950	364	−34.4%
1961	435	+19.5%
1970	374	−14.0%
1980	366	−2.1%
1991	330	−9.8%
2001	358	+8.5%
2011	333	−7.0%
2021	386	+15.9%
Source: Censuses
