= Archduke Joseph's Palace =

Royal residence in Budapest, Hungary

Coordinates: 47.4981°N 19.0363°E

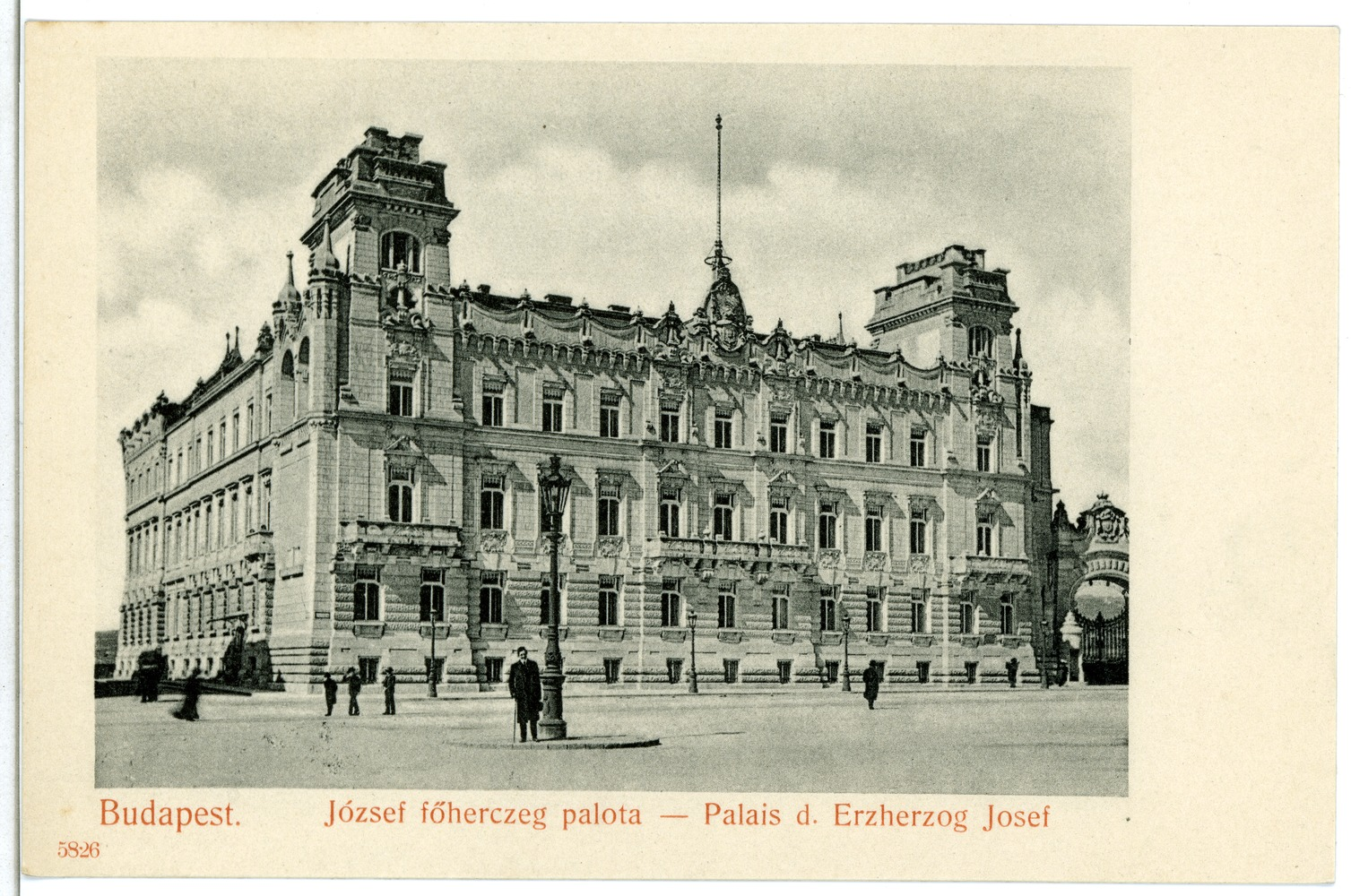
Archduke Joseph's Palace in 1905

Archduke Joseph's Palace (Hungarian: József főhercegi palota) is a former royal residence located on Castle Hill (Várhegy) in Budapest, Hungary. It was located next to Buda Castle. Currently, it is being reconstructed as part of a revival programme of the Buda castle hill.

The site was occupied before by the Teleki Palace. The building was the property of Archduke Joseph Karl of Austria, second son of Archduke Joseph of Austria (Palatine of Hungary).

== History ==
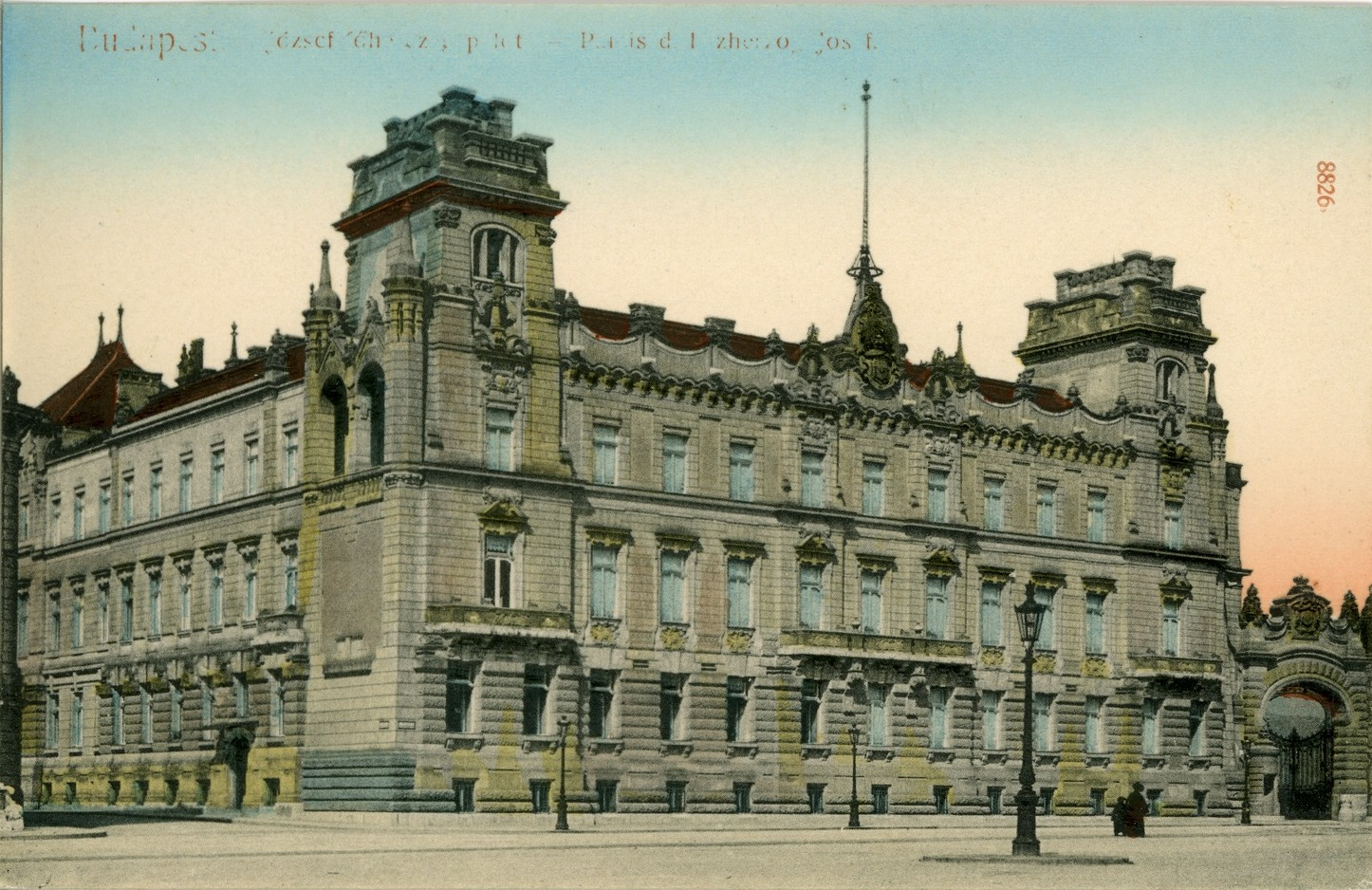
Archduke Joseph's Palace in 1907

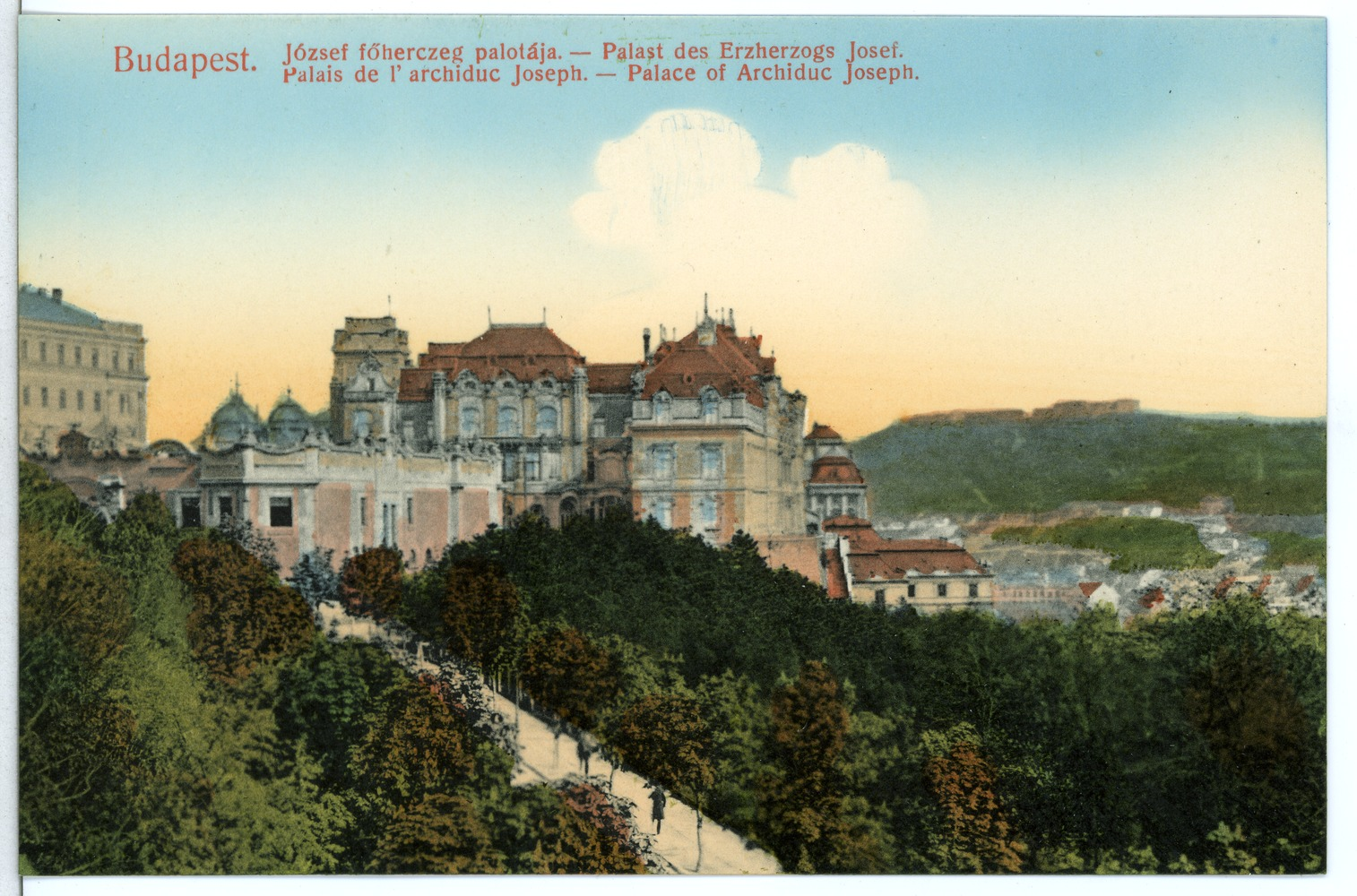
Archduke Joseph's Palace in 1909

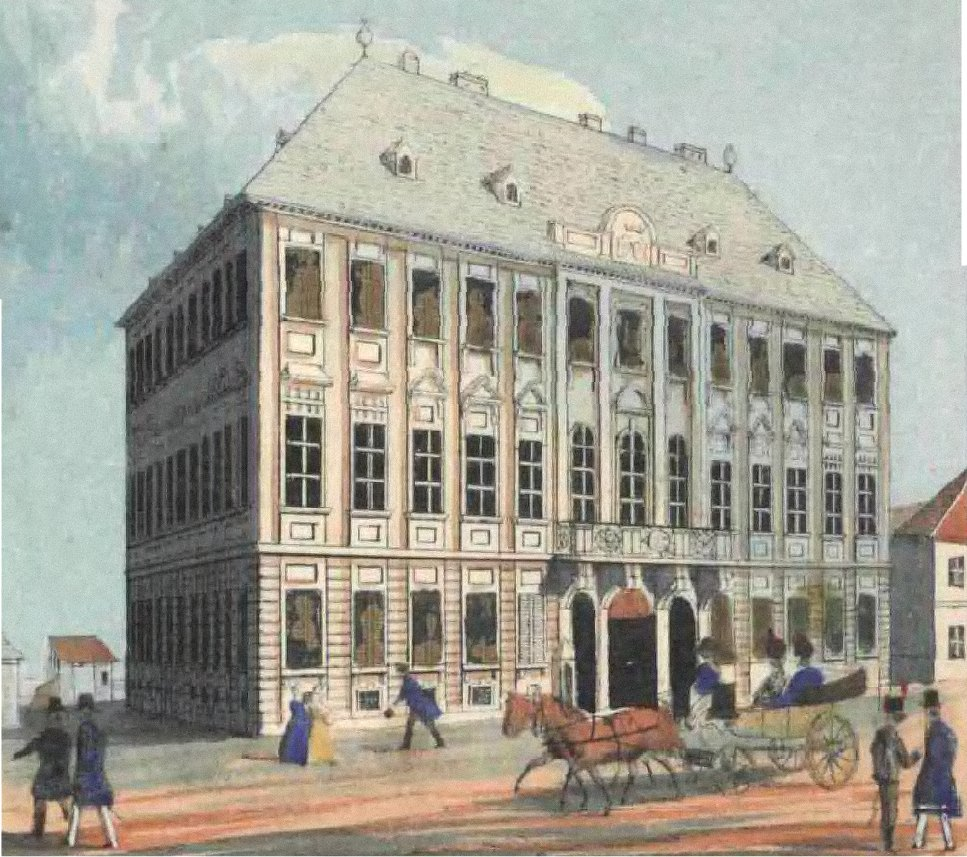
The Teleki Palace in 1837

=== Middle Ages up to Siege of Buda ===
In the Middle Ages, two houses stood on the site where now the Archduke Joseph palace is. On the northern side stood the palace of László Pálóczi, who held the office of regional judge between 1446 and 1470. After Pálóczi's death, in 1471, King Matthias gave the building to Nicholas Csupor, Voivode of Transylvania. In 1474, it was transferred to the chapter house opposite it and became the residence of canons. Benedict Heym's house built in 1362 stood on the southern half of the plot, which was acquired in the 1380s by Cardinal Demeter, Archbishop of Esztergom, and after 1514 by the Bánffy family.

During the Ottoman–Habsburg wars, both houses became ruins. After the siege of Buda and the expulsion of the Turks, it became the property of the German Gassl brothers, but in 1714 the property was expropriated by the Austrian War Council for military purposes (to establish a battery position).

=== Teleki Palace ===
It was auctioned off by the army in 1787, at which time József Teleki (1738–1796), archbishop and crown guard of Ugoccia, bought it at the suggestion of his secretary, Dániel Cornides, a professor at the University of Pest. Teleki had a U-shaped, two-story, 12-apartment palace built here, based on the plans of the Bratislava architect Anton Fisches, in the so-called ‘Zopfstil’ style. It was completed in 1789, at which time it received its long-used name, the Teleki Palace. It was not used as the primary residence for the Teleki family. In 1857, it was bought by the imperial treasury and assigned to Archduke Albrecht, who was military governor-general of Hungary between 1851 and 1859.

After the Austro-Hungarian Compromise of 1867, the Ministry of the Interior was temporarily housed in the Teleki Palace. In 1869–70, it was rebuilt and expanded in accordance with the needs of the General Staff, based on the plans of Lajos Frey (1829–1877) and Lipót Kauser (1818–1877).

=== Archduke Joseph of Austria, prince of Hungary ===
Palatine Joseph's son, Archduke Joseph Karl (1833–1905), cavalry general, commander-in-chief of the Hungarian Armed Forces, moved the offices of the new High Command of the Hungarian Armed Forces here in 1873. Between Szent György tér (‘St. George Square’) and Dísz tér, the new Royal Hungarian Ministry of Defense was built in 1889, the offices were moved, Archduke Joseph Karl bought the Teleki Palace for himself from the Treasury. In 1902, the archduke rebuilt and expanded the palace, in a historicizing style, based on the designs of Flóris Korb and Kálmán Giergl. It was then that it got its corner towers and the eastern decorations of the western (Krisztinaváros) facade.

=== Destruction of Archduke Joseph's Palace ===
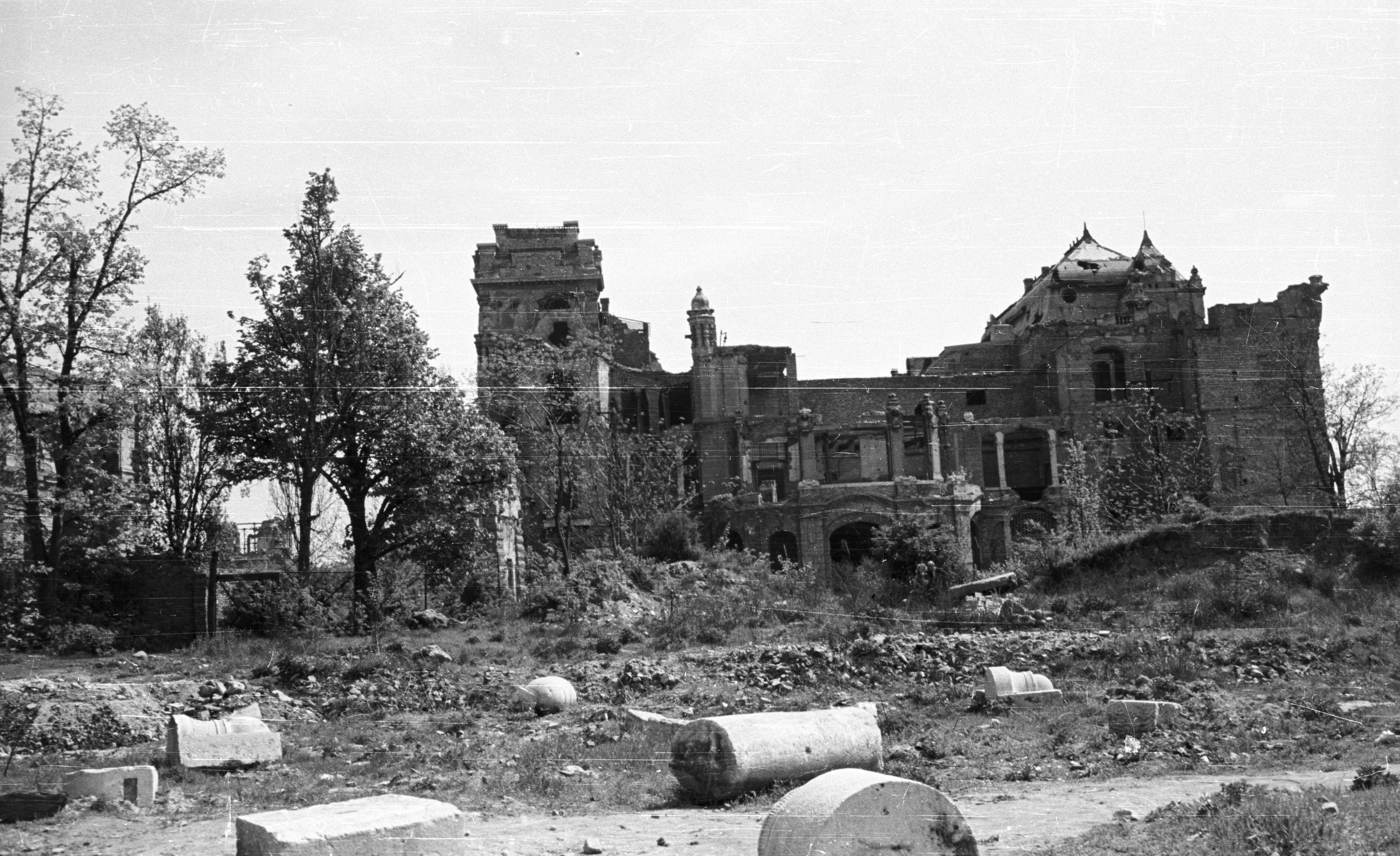
Archduke Joseph's Palace destroyed after the Second World War

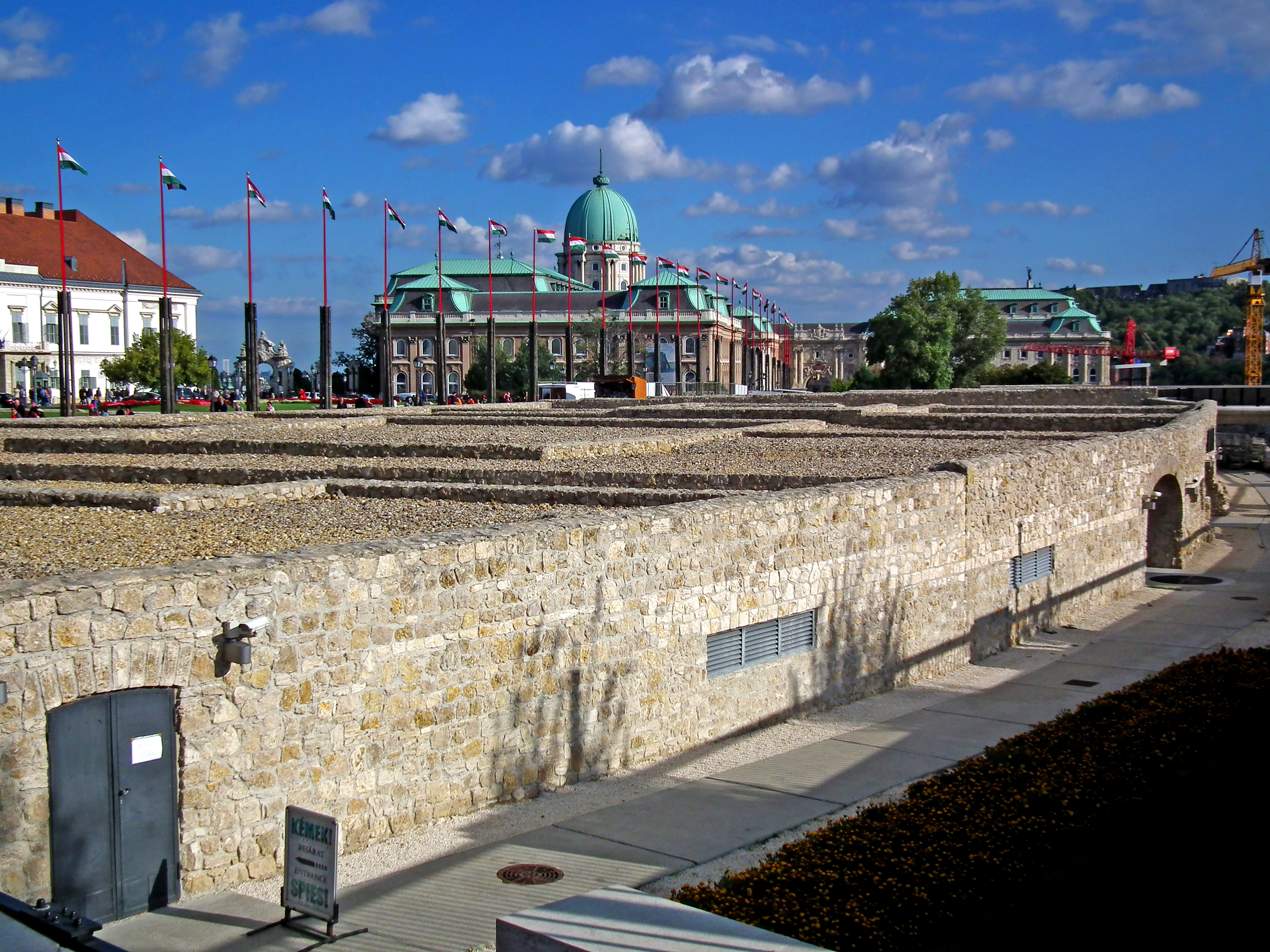
The location of Archduke Joseph's Palace in 2016 before reconstruction started in 2021

During the First and Second World Wars, the palace was inhabited by the son of Archduke Joseph Karl, Archduke Joseph August and his family. During the siege of Budapest, the Archduke's family fled to the West. The western (Kristinaváros) facade of the building was hit by several shots. According to contemporary experts, the injuries could have been repaired. At the time of the debris removal work, it was a dormitory for industrial students and a workers' canteen. It was evacuated in 1953. It stood empty for a long time and was set on fire in the 1960s for filming purposes. In June 1968, the dilapidated palace was blown up and the ruins along with the foundations were demolished and cleaned. In the 1990s, the palace and the so-called In place of the Josephs Gardens, the state administration had a medieval ruin field built, and later a basement museum was also created below ground level.

== Archduke Joseph's Palace Garden ==
To the north of the palace, on the edge of the western castle wall, in the area stretching to the Fehérvár rondella, many houses were built in the Middle Ages and during the Turkish subjugation, this was ‘Szent György utca’. After the expulsion of the Turks, German settlers moved here. According to a register taken in 1784, the ground-floor houses of Catharina Berghoffer and Antonius Seth stood here. At the beginning of the 1800s, more houses were built here, in the baroque and coiffure style, but in 1902 Archduke Joseph Karl, the new owner of the Teleki Palace, demolished all of them and created a palace garden between 1901 and 1906 (for the palace designers, Flóris Korb and based on the plans of Kálmán Giergl). In 1903, a "spectacle" barn was built at the northern end, in neo-Renaissance style. After the Second World War, the site of the park was razed, and a medieval rubble field and car park were "built" in its place. Until 2021, a wine house and a cellar museum operated in it.

== Reconstruction ==
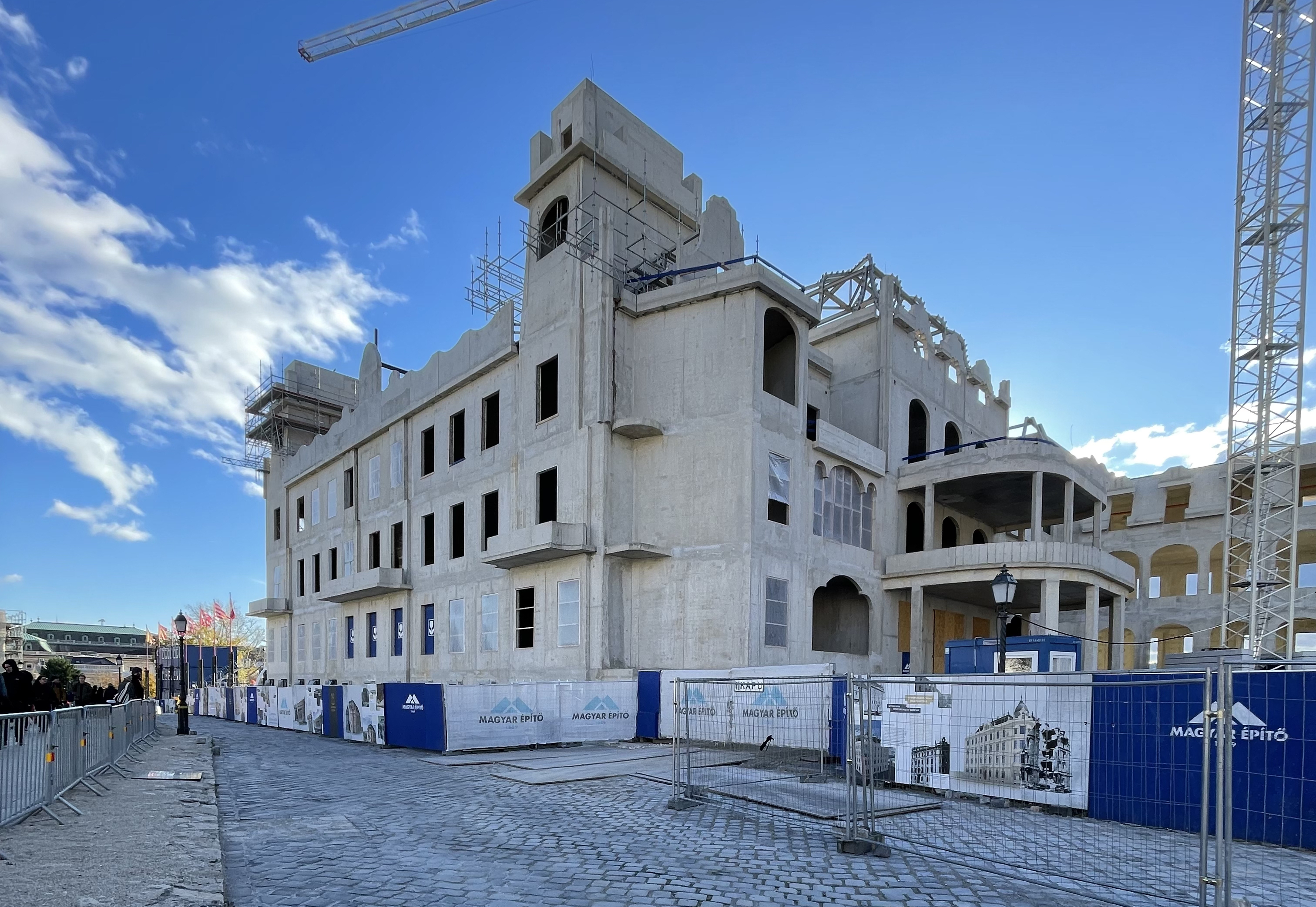
Reconstruction in progress (2023)

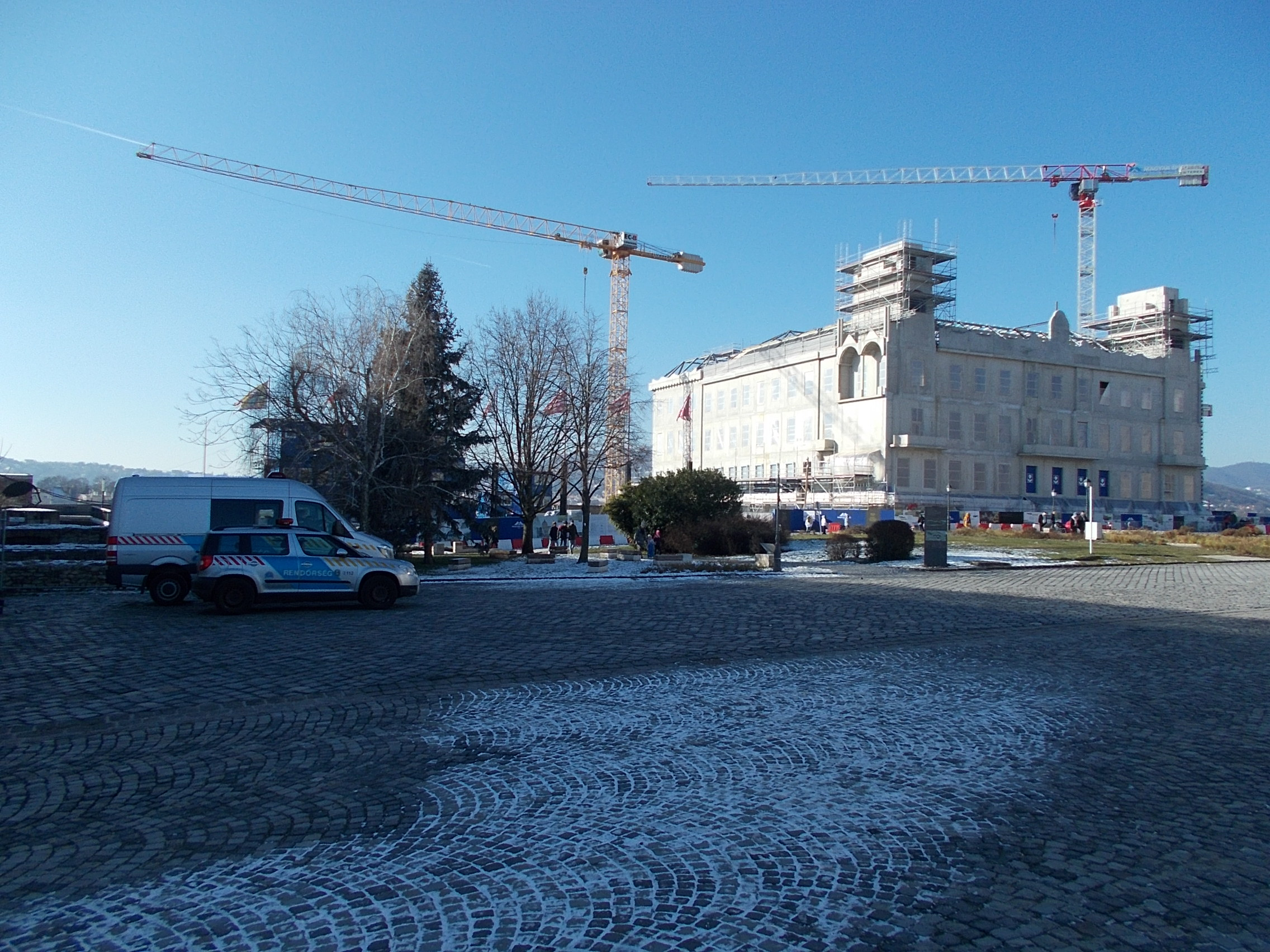
Reconstruction in progress (2023)

On 23 January 2019, the Hungarian government made the decision to rebuild Archduke Joseph's Palace as part of the "National Hauszmann Program", the revitalization and restoration program of Buda Castle and its direct environment. At the end of 2020, the Castle Administration published the renderings of the palace and the associated Neo-Renaissance garden, as well as the courtyard stable. The implementation contract with the contractor was signed on 15 July 2021, and work began in the area on 16 July.

== Additional Reading ==
- Basics, Beatrix (2003). "A Szent György Tér Ábrázolásai" [The Representations of the St. George Square]. Budapest várostörténeti monográfiái sorozat. 31: 127–136.
- Farbaky, Peter (2003). "A Sándor-Palota, a Teleki-Palota és az Udvari Istálló" [The Sándor Palace, the Teleki Palace and the Royal Stable]. Budapest várostörténeti monográfiái sorozat. 31: 137–160.
