= National Hauszmann Program =

Renovation plan for the Buda Castle district in Budapest, Hungary

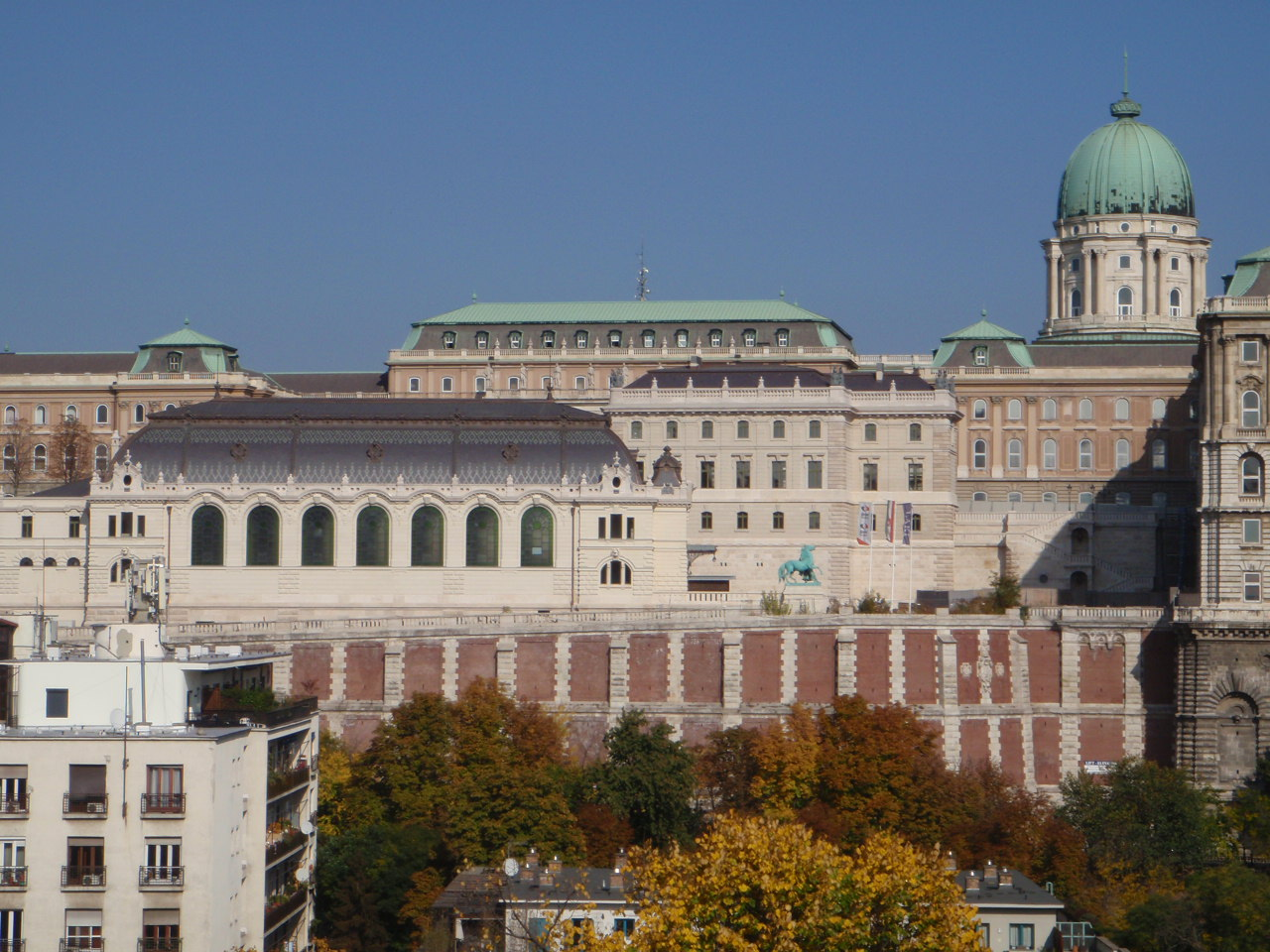
From left to right: the reconstructed Royal Riding Hall, Castle Guards' Barracks and Stöckl Staircase in 2019

The National Hauszmann Program (Hungarian: Nemzeti Hauszmann terv) is a national renovation plan for the Buda Castle district in Budapest, Hungary, which aims to rebuild or restore several buildings, gardens and parks to their former glory. These structures were damaged or destroyed in World War II during the battle of Budapest that took place between December 1944 and February 1945 and were not rebuilt or renovated by the government of the then-Hungarian People's Republic for ideological reasons. The project is named after Alajos Hauszmann, the castle's last major architect. The renovation project will last from 2019 to 2030.

== History ==
The Hungarian Government formulated the "National Hauszmann Program" to revitalize and restore Buda Castle and its surrounding district in the period of 2019−2030. The program is named in honour of the Austro-Hungarian architect Alajos Hauszmann, who was himself the architectural director of the expansion work on the Royal Castle for a decade and a half and gave it its current neo-Baroque appearance. The first phase of the program started in 2016. By 2019, the reconstruction of the Royal Riding Hall, Stöckl Staircase and the Castle Guards' Barrack had been completed and the rebuilding of the Ybl Slope next to the barrack started. In the same year, further reconstructions were announced, namely Archduke Joseph's Palace, the former Headquarters of the Ministry of Defense, and the former Ministry of Foreign Affairs' building.

Critics of the Orbán government cited the 1,000bn forint Hauszmann Program as an example of Orban's wasteful spending, and a "land grab". After his victory in the 2026 elections, Péter Magyar "made great social media entertainment" through his tours of the reconstructed sections of the Castle and other Hauszmann Program buildings, calling some of them "fake" and saying they were built for the benefit of Orbán and his ministers.

== Overview ==
The program includes, for example:

- Reconstruction of the Royal Riding Hall of Hungary, Castle Guards' Barracks, Stöckl Staircase, Archduke Joseph's Palace, St Stephen's Room in the Royal Palace, and former Red Cross Headquarters;
- Reconstruction of the Ministry of Defense of Hungary and Tower of the National Archives of Hungary;
- Renovation of the Fehérvári Rondella and the surrounding gardens;
- Restoration of the Equestrian Statue of Artúr Görgey and the Matthias Fountain.
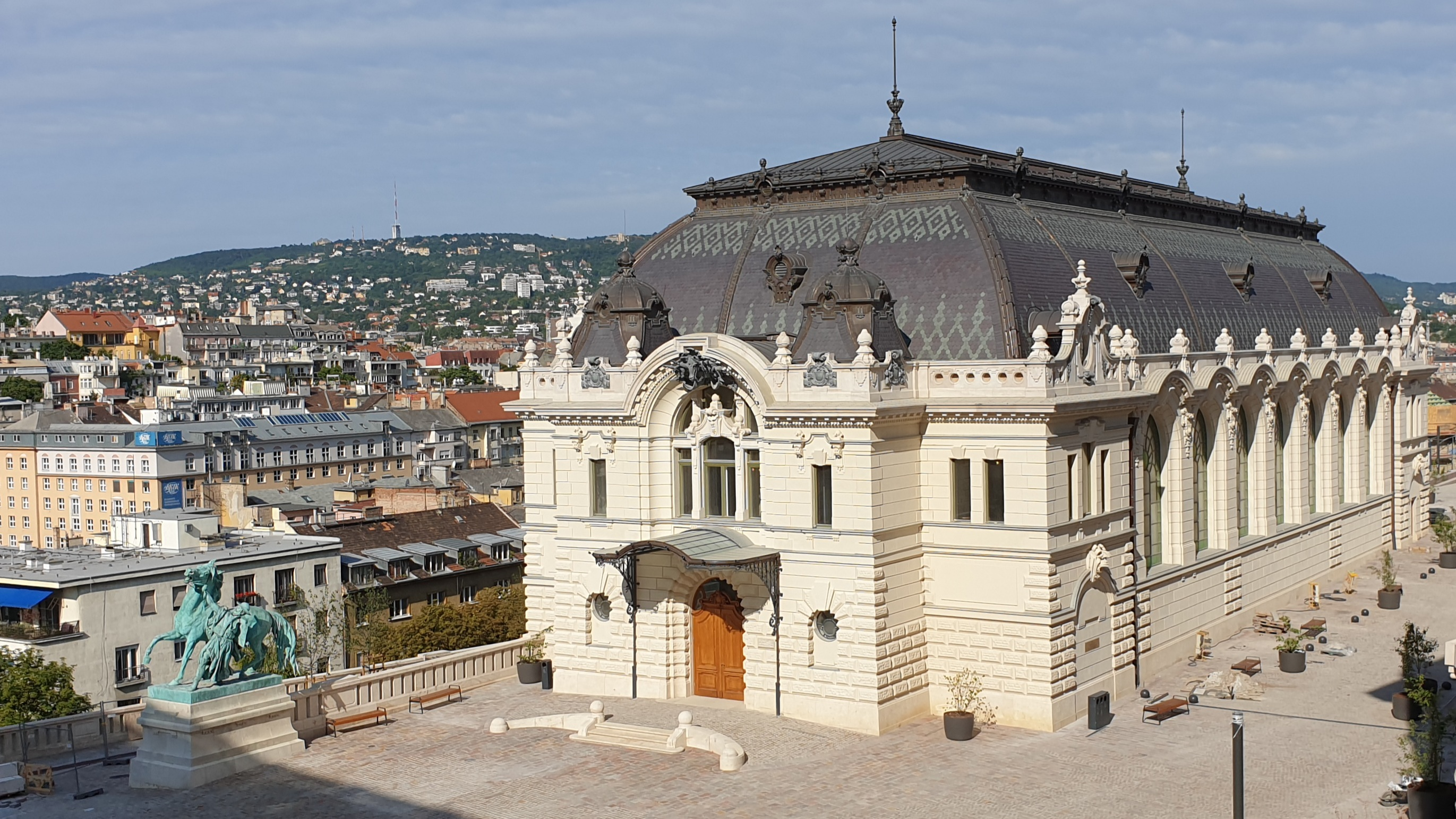
The reconstructed Royal Riding Hall in 2021

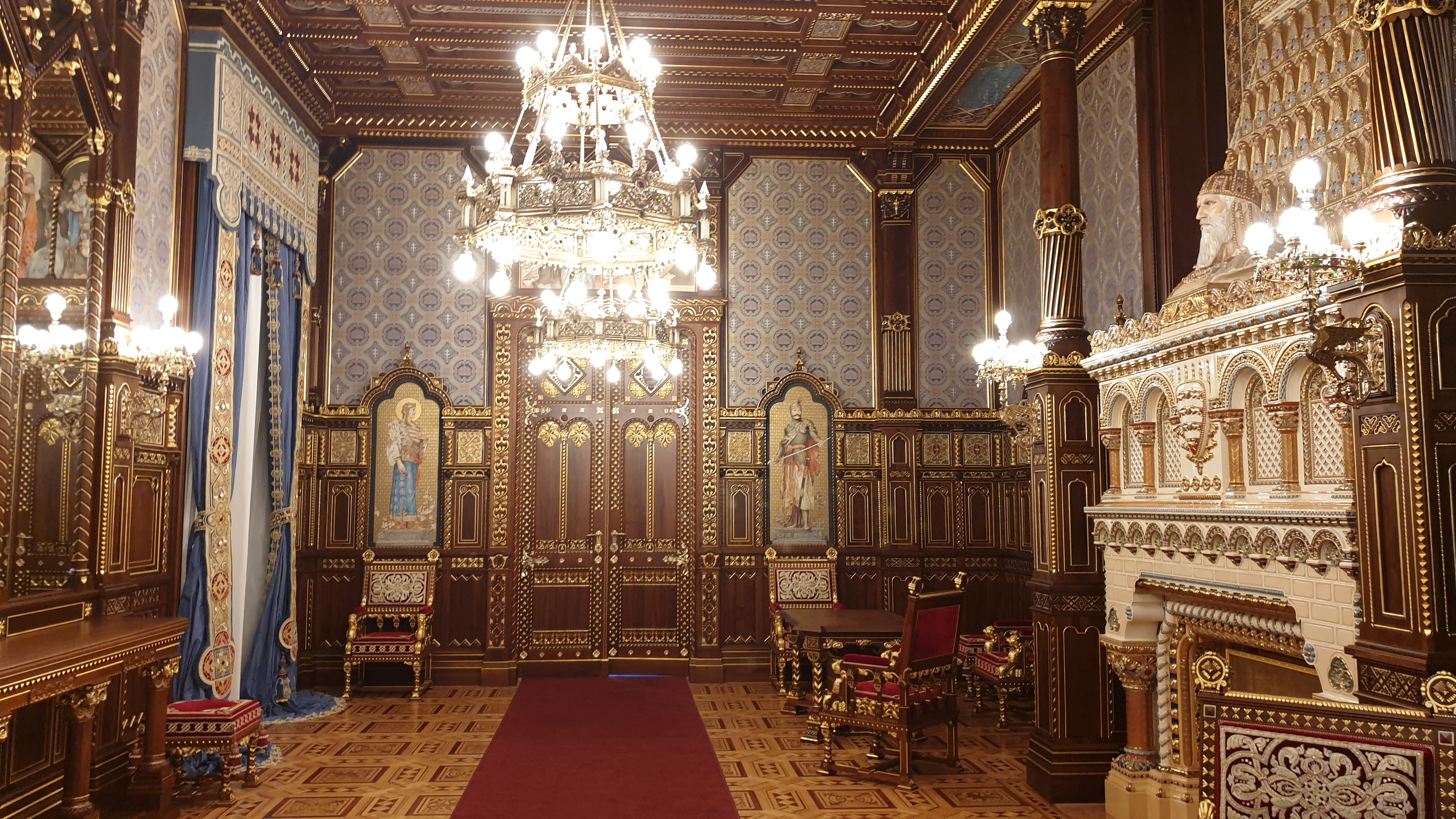
The reconstructed St Stephen's Room in 2022

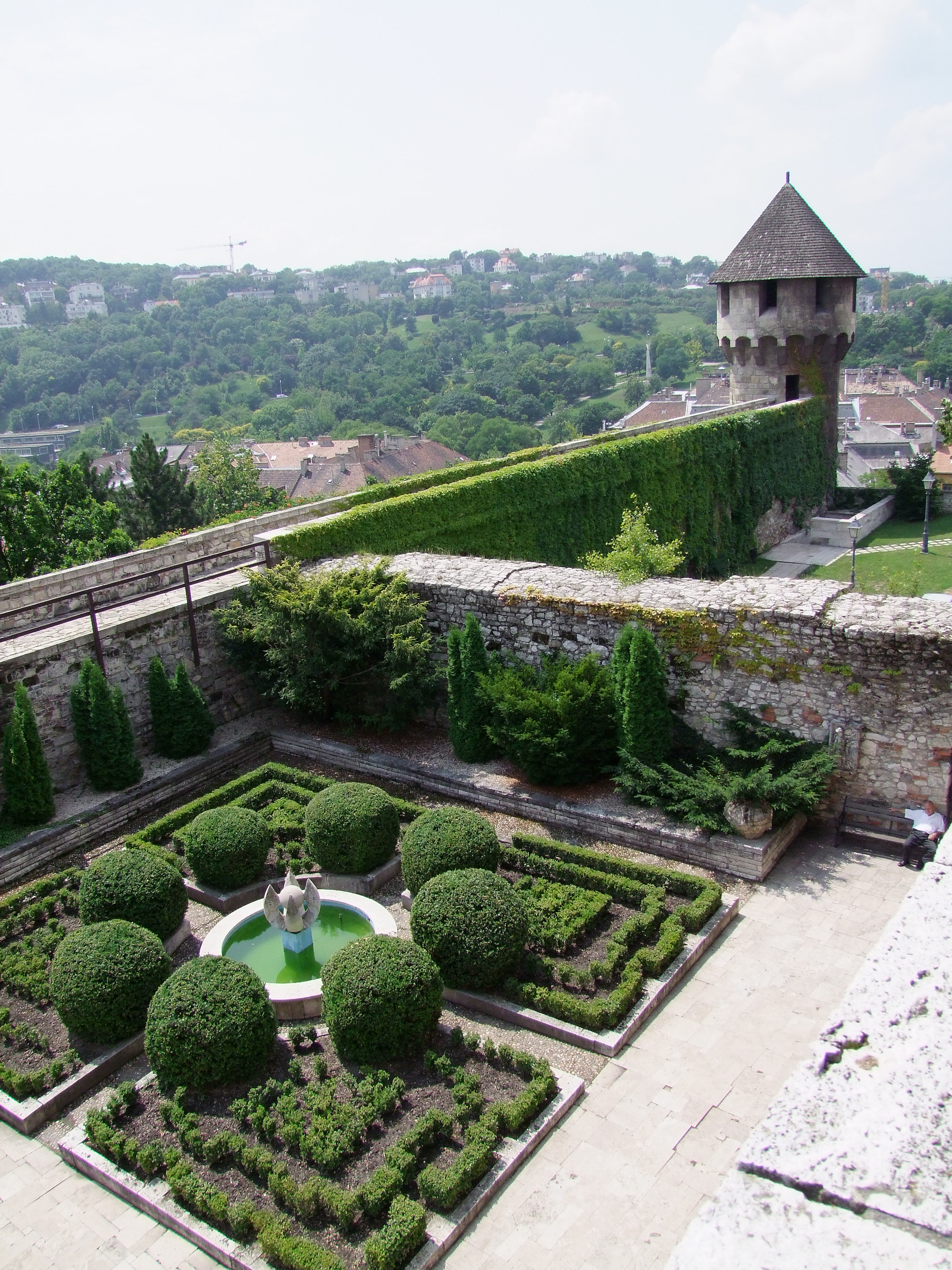
Part of a redesigned garden in the Castle District
