= Reconstruction (architecture) =

Technique in architectural conservation

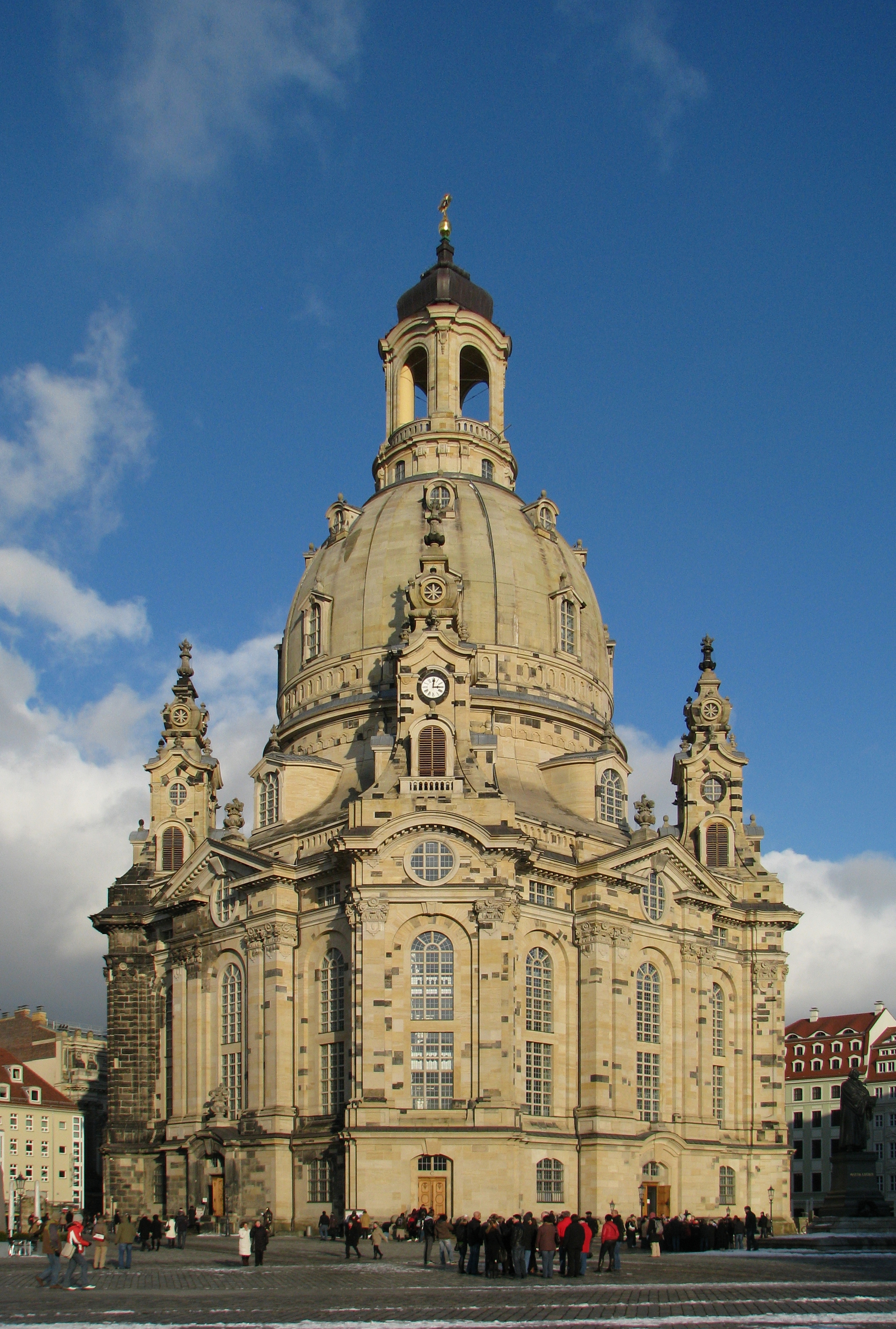
Frauenkirche (Church of Our Lady, opened in 2005) in Dresden, Germany, reconstructed after its destruction during World War II

Reconstruction in architectural conservation is the returning of a place to a known earlier state by the introduction of new materials. It is related to the architectural concepts of restoration (repairing existing building fabric) and preservation (the prevention of further decay), wherein the most extensive form of reconstruction is creating a replica of a destroyed building.

More narrowly, such as under the Secretary of Interior's Standards in the United States, "reconstruction" is "the act or process of depicting, using new construction, the form, features, and detailing of a non-surviving site, landscape, building, structure, or object to replicate its appearance at a specific time and in its historic location".

== Reconstruction of buildings and structures ==
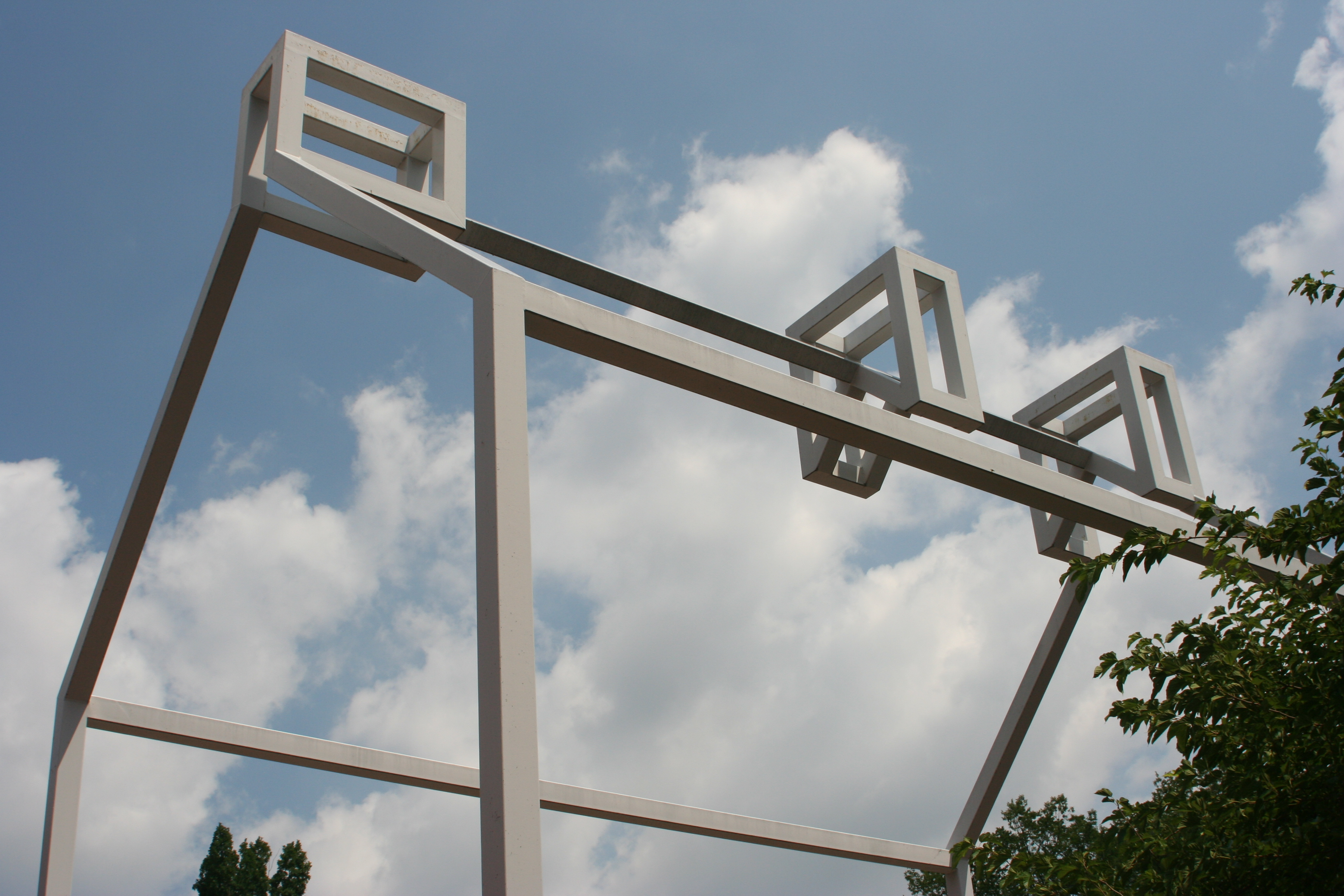
Robert Venturi's "ghost structure" reconstruction at Franklin Court of Benjamin Franklin's house, as part of Independence National Historical Park, in Philadelphia, Pennsylvania. The design concept, since used at other sites, resulted from insufficient information to accurately reconstruct the house, and it was decided merely to suggest it.

There may be several reasons for building or creating a replica building or structure.

Sometimes, it is the result of the destruction of landmark monuments that is experienced as traumatic by region inhabitants, such as through war, planning errors and politically motivated destruction, other times, merely the result of natural disasters. Examples include Yongdingmen (former Peking city gate temporarily sacrificed to traffic considerations), St Mark's Campanile in Venice (collapsed in 1902), House of the Blackheads (Riga), Iberian Gate and Chapel and the Cathedral of Christ the Saviour in Moscow (destroyed by order of Joseph Stalin), Dresden Frauenkirche and Semperoper in Dresden (bombed at the end of World War II). A specifically well-known example is the rebuilding of the historic city center of Warsaw after 1945. The Old Town and the Royal Castle had been badly damaged already at the outset of World War II. It was systematically razed to the ground by German troops after the Warsaw Uprising of 1944. The reconstruction of Warsaw's historic center (e.g., St. John's Cathedral, St. Kazimierz Church, Ujazdów Castle) and, e.g., the replica of the Stari Most built in Mostar (Bosnia Herzegovina) have met with official approval by UNESCO.

Other times, reconstructions are made in the case of sites where the historic and cultural significance was not recognized until long after their destruction, which is common in North America, especially with respect to its early history. Examples include the reconstruction of Colonial Williamsburg in Virginia, the rebuilding of numerous structures in Independence National Historical Park in Philadelphia, and Fort William Historical Park in Ontario, Canada.

== Types of reconstruction ==
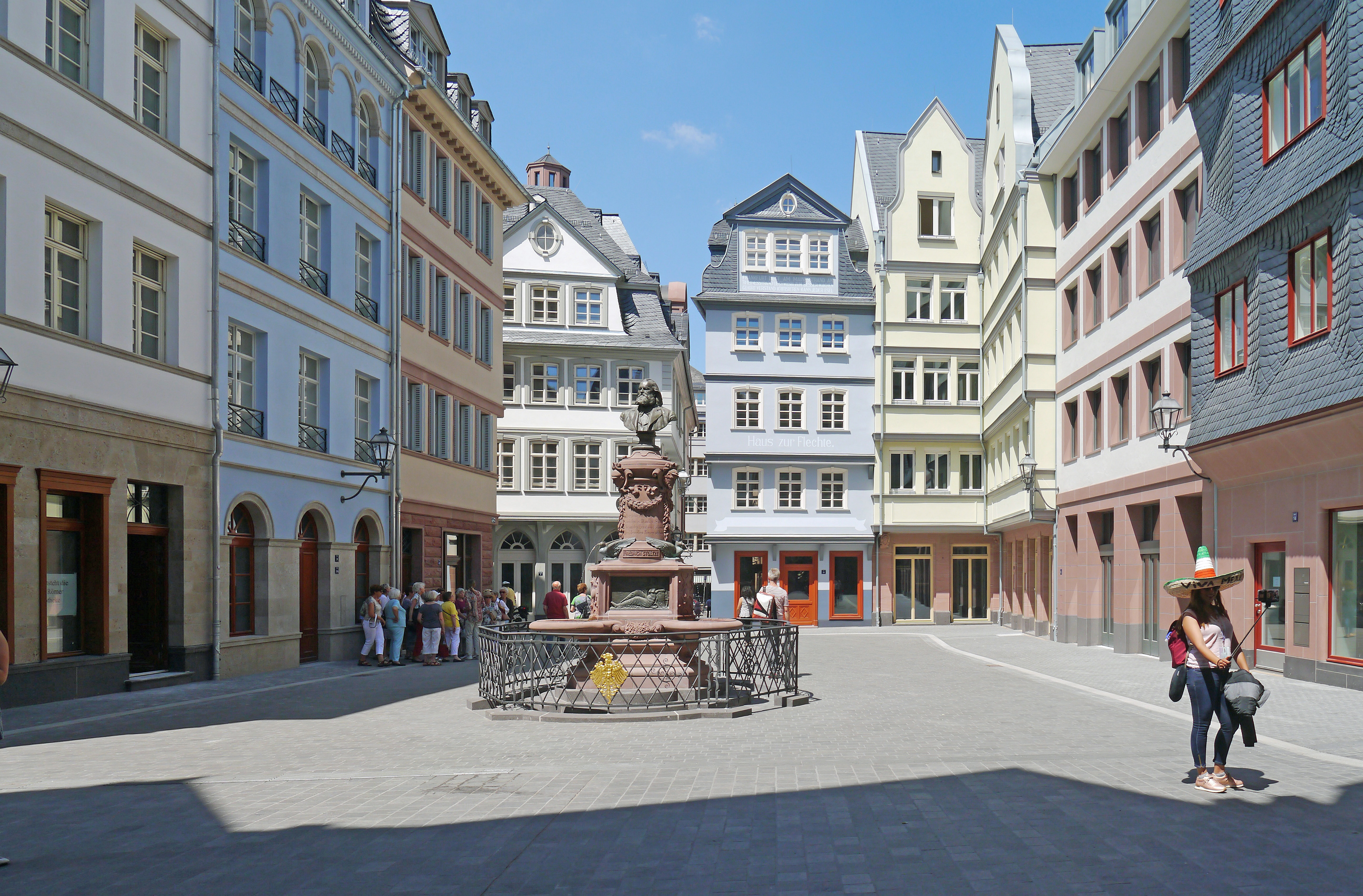
The New Frankfurt Old Town (Dom-Römer Quarter) in Frankfurt am Main. An example of "mixed" reconstruction.

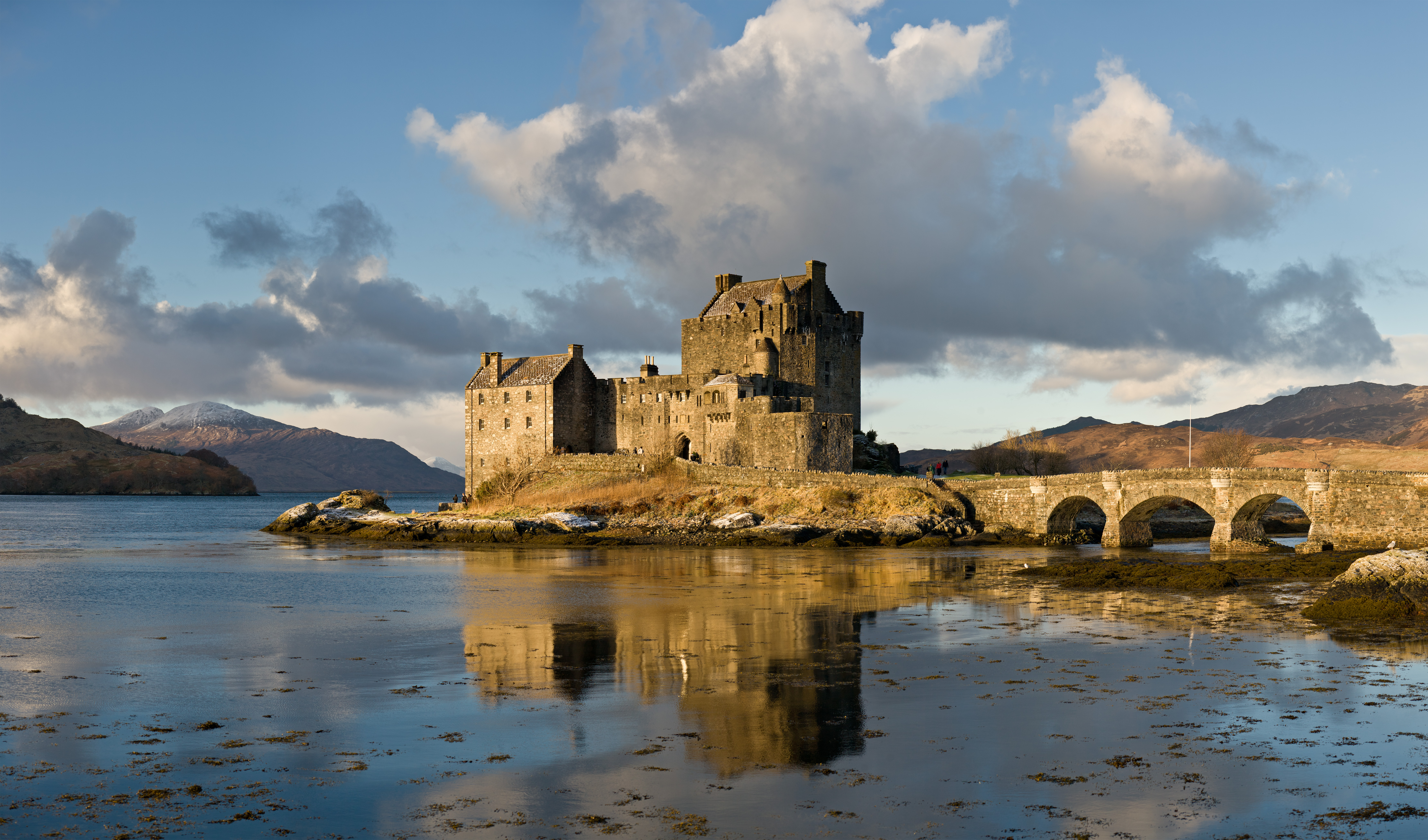
Eilean Donan Castle, Scotland, an example of a "modelled" reconstruction.

There are different approaches to reconstruction, which differ in the degree of fidelity to the original and in the sensitivity to implementation. In architecture, Georg Mörsch describes reconstruction as a "scientific method of extracting sources to rebuild things that have gone under, regardless of the time that has passed since then."

- True-to-the-original reconstruction is a reconstruction carried out using the same materials and the same methods as possible after extensive source research. Often existing original components are used. This type of reconstruction can be found above all in culturally and historically significant buildings, which then serve as objects for viewing and are used as museums. An example of this is the completion of Cologne Cathedral, which was finally completed in the late 19th century when the original construction plans were discovered and these were followed.
- Modelled reconstruction does not meet the requirements for fidelity to the original due to a lack of sources. Typical examples are, for example, when only façade plans or image documentation of buildings are preserved - the rest of the necessary information is "reinvented" as much as possible by comparing it with similar contemporary objects. This type of "new creative" reconstruction, combined with a lot of imagination, had its heyday especially in historicism (with neo-Romanesque, neo-Gothic, neo-renaissance and neo-baroque). Many neo-Gothic castles have been created from the remains of medieval castles, such as Hohenschwangau Castle, Eilean Donan Castle, Scotland, Hohenzollern Castle and numerous others in the first third of the 20th century.
- Replicative reconstruction is a form of reconstruction which, for functionalist reasons, serves to imitate (not: interpret), preserve or produce a (historicized) style, but with a different use and no longer has anything to do with the original or old building. (Example: Nikolaiviertel built in Berlin during the GDR era).
- Interpretive reconstruction creates a new design based on historical sources. Buildings or parts of buildings are created that correspond to the character and overall impression of the original, without attempting a one-to-one copy. Examples are the Prinzipalmarkt in Münster or the additions to the Frankfurt Römerberg. The facades and gables of the houses were partly redesigned, but the overall impression of the market was to be retained. This method is derived from the neutral retouching as a modern restoration. This fulfils the desire for reconstruction by restoring the overall impression of a place without the concerns over authenticity around replicas.
- Didactic reconstructions: In connection with the development of archaeological excavation sites into didactic theme parks, reconstructions of striking ancient structures such as city walls, city gates, temples, villas or forts.
- Experimental reconstructions are part of experimental archaeology. An example of this is the Guédelon Castle which has been under construction since 1997 using only the techniques and materials of the 13th century to research the construction method and duration. The Campus Galli is another construction project to build a medieval monastery town based on the St. Gallen monastery plan. These are previously non-existent buildings, the focus is on the research aspect.

=== Challenges with reconstructions ===
Regardless of what type of reconstruction is done, there are some recurring challenges and questions.

- Original structures are often incompletely documented, so the missing parts have to be imagined, inferred or made in a different way from the original.
- Building materials or construction techniques used to build the original are barely or not at all available or not financially affordable. The same applies to craftspeople who still (or again) master the historical techniques and materials.
- The original would not correspond to the space requirements that the new use of the building will make. The inside of the building will be restructured and subdivided.
- The replica would not meet today's static safety requirements, so you have to change the structure.
- The original or replica with the same interior structure would not comply with the statutory safety regulations, such as in fire protection or escape routes.
- The original or replica would not meet today's legal requirements.
- If implemented exactly, the original would no longer meet today's comfort requirements (air conditioning, electrical engineering, sanitary installations), so the original design is adapted accordingly.

=== Reasons for and against reconstructions ===
Since the end of the Second World War, the reconstruction of buildings has been controversial, especially in cities destroyed by the war.

In the public debate around reconstruction, it is mostly assumed that historical or historicising architecture is perceived by the average citizen as more appealing than contemporary architecture. The loss of the "beautiful old" is seen as an aesthetic diminution, and historically created and poorly closed building gaps are experienced as a permanent "flaw in the cityscape".

The reconstruction of buildings is often controversial among architects and preservationists. There are different motives and values. Overall, the question of the reconstruction of prominent urban locations in the context of the cityscape proves to be significantly more conflict-prone than is the case with remote buildings or in the open, for example with experimental or didactic reconstructions.

Many reconstructions are new buildings with a historical façade design, but modern construction technology and with completely new uses. The original building fabric is often hardly preserved and architects in particular argue against this approach, saying that it merely creates a historical impression to appeal to a certain group of buyers.

However, there are also prominent examples of reconstructions with missing original substance. The reconstruction of destroyed Warsaw's Old Town is a reconstruction even in the UNESCO list of World Heritage. Reconstructed buildings are generally not perceived as such by those who are unfamiliar with them, which makes the cityscape more attractive in the eyes of the beholder. Even in the awareness of the residents, the fact of the reconstruction of a building is mostly forgotten after a while, the buildings are perceived again as an organic part of their environment. The desire for the original substance, which is usually put forward by monument conservationists, cannot be met in many old buildings either; one speaks of the Theseus paradox.

A crucial question in monument protection today is that of whether the value and originality are in the materials or the design. This does not only refer to the material erected at the time of construction but also to the various later layers that are evidence of their times. The practice of both architectural and art history does not regard a certain version of an object as "the original", neither the first version nor the most splendid or most popular at the time, nor the last one that has been remembered.

The Venice Charter of 1964 was an international guideline for dealing with the original building fabric for the preservation of monuments; it is the most important monument conservation text of the 20th century and defines central values and procedures for the conservation and restoration of monuments.

Opponents of reconstruction often point out that rebuilding could contribute to the transfiguration of the past. Reconstruction critics from the architectural profession and related professions assume that modern urban design and contemporary architecture are an expression of social identity that is continuously developing. According to this, society needs to maintain its architecture, which meets its living conditions and needs and whose expression it is, through building projects, and not, on the other hand, to recreate old architecture. This consensus on what is contemporary is questioned by those in favor of reconstruction. From cultural and historical Critics see reconstruction as a phenomenon of the 19th and 20th centuries that had hardly any role models in history and is now outdated. Reconstruction can thus only be historically legitimized to a limited extent. On the other hand, the term cityscape - as an architectural unit extending beyond the individual building - only came into the field of vision of architecture in the course of modernity. Proponents of the reconstruction, on the other hand, have little fear of contact with the harmonistic architectural conceptions of the 19th century and also point to the lasting popularity of the domes that were "then completed" according to the principles that are not permitted today. However, it is precisely the free access to the formal language of all earlier epochs that is considered one of the essential features of historicism as seen in postmodernism. In a different sense, the reconstruction fulfils the demand for an answer to the needs of the time and in this sense is an expression of contemporary building activity. How later historical epochs will judge the contemporary phase of architecture and its peculiarities cannot be said.

For architects, it is often not desirable to create replicas instead of creating something new. In this sense, every new building is "more historically accurate" because the destroyed objects were an expression of their own time. On the one hand, the "idea of a building" is the actual work of an architect and a reconstruction would represent an appreciation in this sense. On the other hand, every architect works in some way with the history of the building site. This reference to the previous buildings is to be seen as an appreciation, even if it is in explicit contrast. Building solutions by the architects of the historical compete with a new project. The fundamental question that remains is why something should be created again instead of a new building.

Prominent individual examples of reconstruction projects and executions show that architecture is a factor in the public that can still polarize just as much as that from the history of architecture known all time. From a global perspective, the entire discussion about the pros and cons of reconstruction is a problem rooted in Eurocentric sensitivities. Other cultures, both the Anglo-American region and Asia, deal with the topic differently: The regular, complete rebuilding of a Buddhist temple is part of the centuries-old tradition in Asian architecture, and the European concept of "true to the original" plays in this culture, which has everything in the philosophical core Material regarded as worthless shell, until today a subordinate role. The 2000-year-old Ise-jingū-Shrines in Japan are ritually rebuilt every 20 years according to the same plans made of wood. In China, for example, while entire historic cities and city centers are being sacrificed to major urban and economic planning projects (Shanghai, 3 Gorges Dam), conversely, historicizing projects are also being implemented - such as the old town project of Datong, a city in the Ming style, or the restoration of the one in the cultural revolution destroyed sacred buildings. In the USA, too, the monument concept plays only a subordinate role today and relates much more to historic monuments that are significant in terms of time and culture than to those of architectural history.

=== Acceptance of reconstructions ===
In a representative survey by the Forsa Institute on behalf of the German Federal Building Culture Foundation, 80% of all participants were in favor of the reconstruction of historic buildings and 15% were against it. The approval of reconstructions was particularly high among women (83%) and 18 to 29-year-olds (86%). When asked whether historical buildings should also be rebuilt for other uses, 80% of all participants answered with "yes" and 16% with "no".

== Examples of reconstructions ==
Prominent examples with worldwide attention that illuminate the diversity of reconstructive intentions and methods:

=== Armenia ===
- Garni Temple (1975)

=== Australia ===
- St Kilda Pavilion (2006)

=== Belgium ===
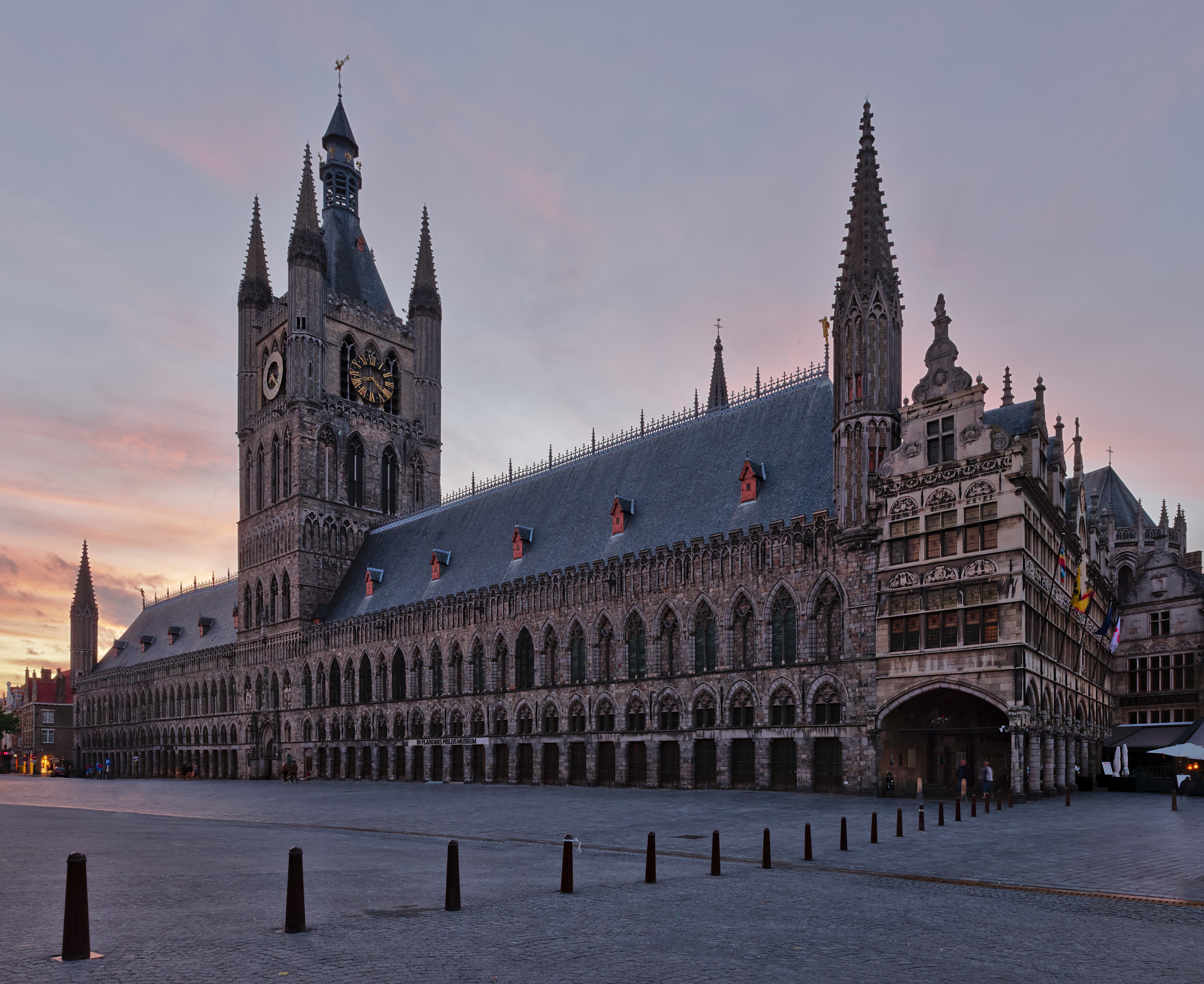
Ypres Cloth Hall – destroyed in World War I, reconstructed by 1967, UNESCO World Heritage since 1999

- Ypres Cloth Hall: destroyed in 1918, reconstructed until 1967, UNESCO World Heritage Site since 1999

=== Bosnia and Herzegovina ===
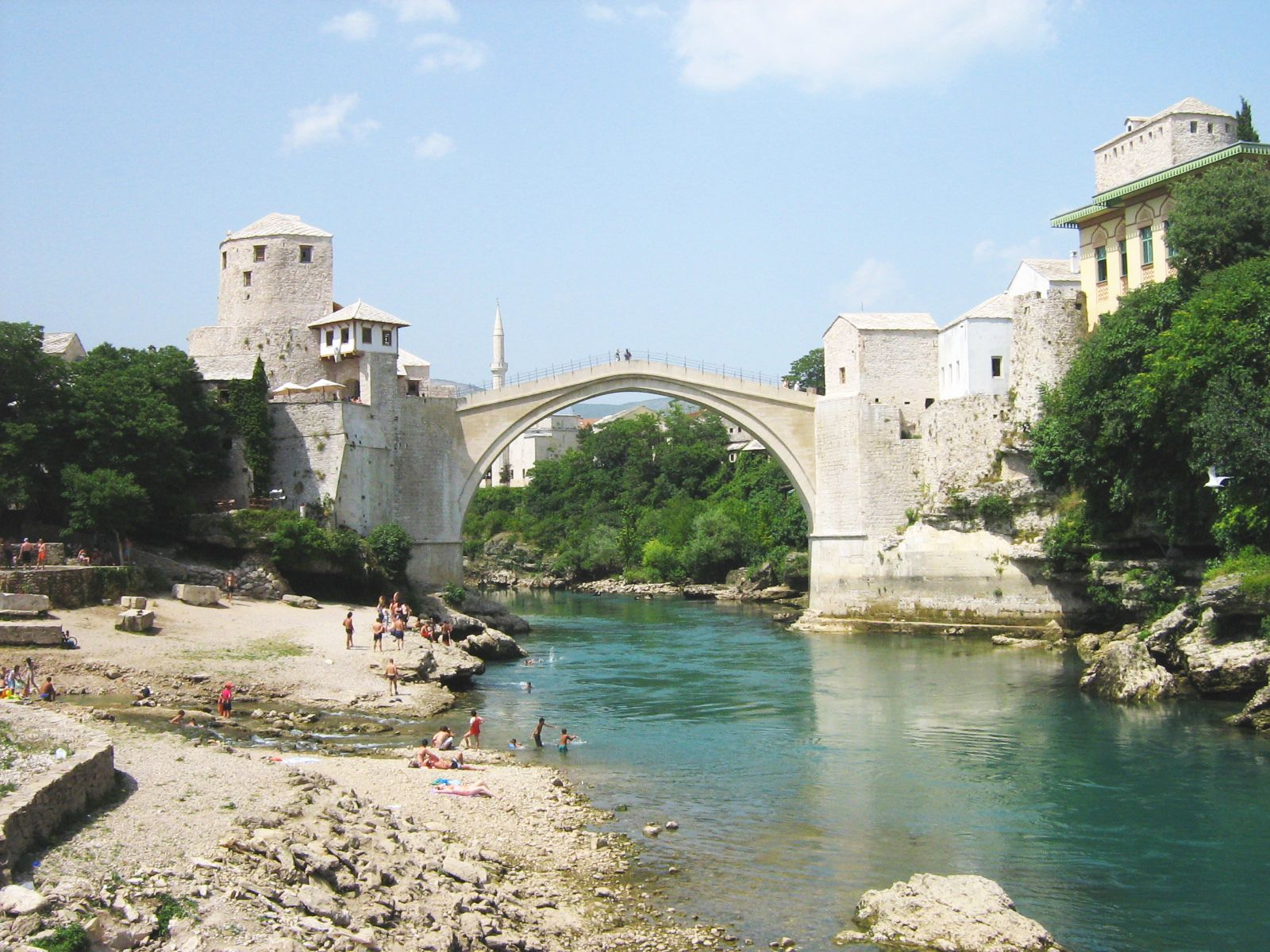
Stari Most in Mostar – destroyed during the Croat–Bosniak War in 1993, reconstructed by 2004, UNESCO World Heritage since 2005

- Stari Most, Mostar: rebuilt with original materials (2004)

=== Canada ===
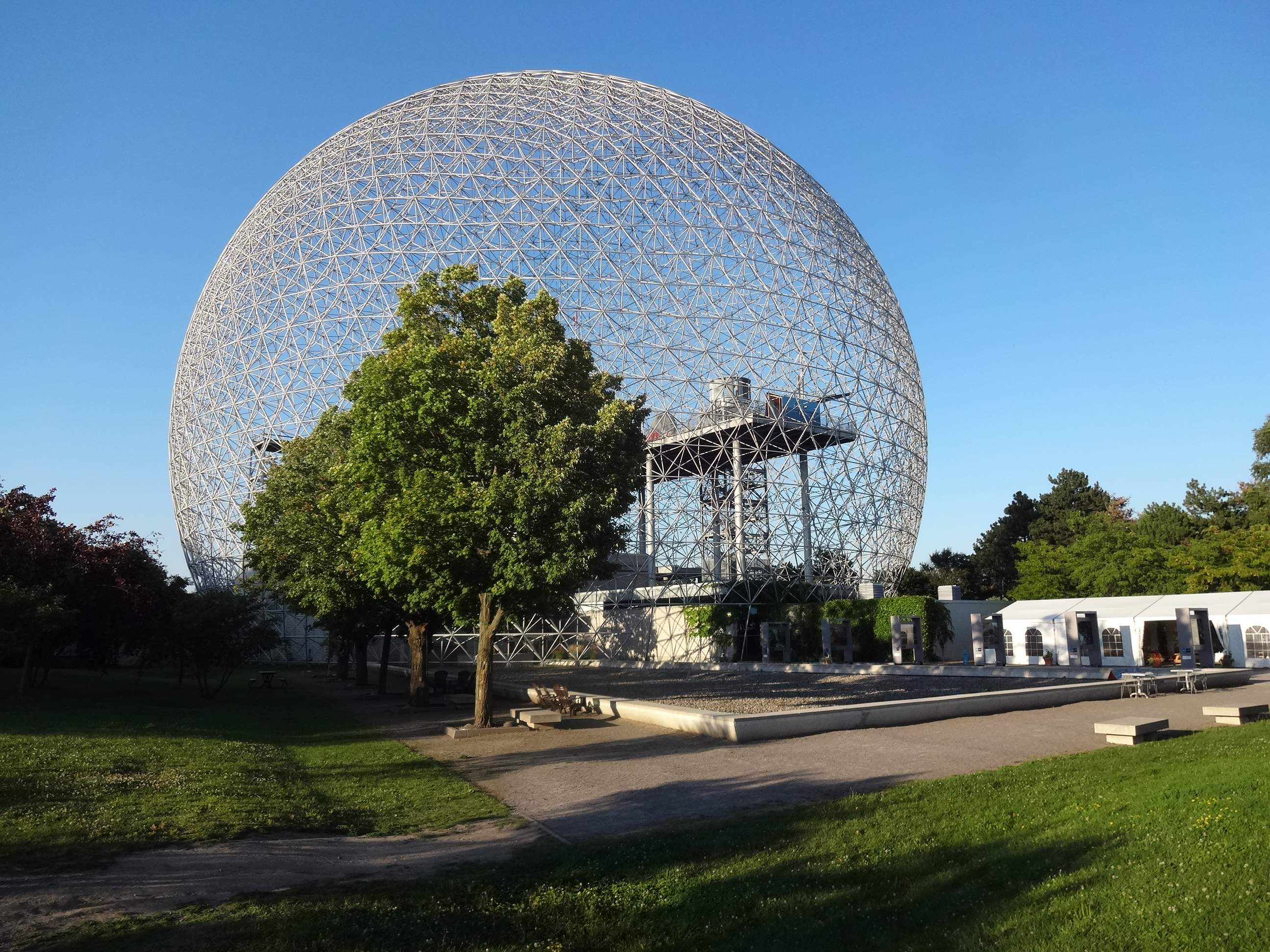
Montreal Biosphère – burned in 1976, reconstructed by 1995

- Cathedral-Basilica of Notre-Dame de Québec, Quebec City (1923)
- Montreal Biosphère (1995)
- Ontario Legislative Building, Toronto (1912)
- Saint-Joachim de Pointe-Claire Church (1885)

=== China ===
- Pavilion of Prince Teng (1989)
- Yellow Crane Tower (1981)
- Yongdingmen Gate, Beijing (2005)
- Porcelain Tower of Nanjing (2015)

=== Croatia ===
- Church of Pentecost, Vinkovci

=== Czech Republic ===
- Bethlehem Chapel, Prague, Czech Republic (1953)

=== France ===
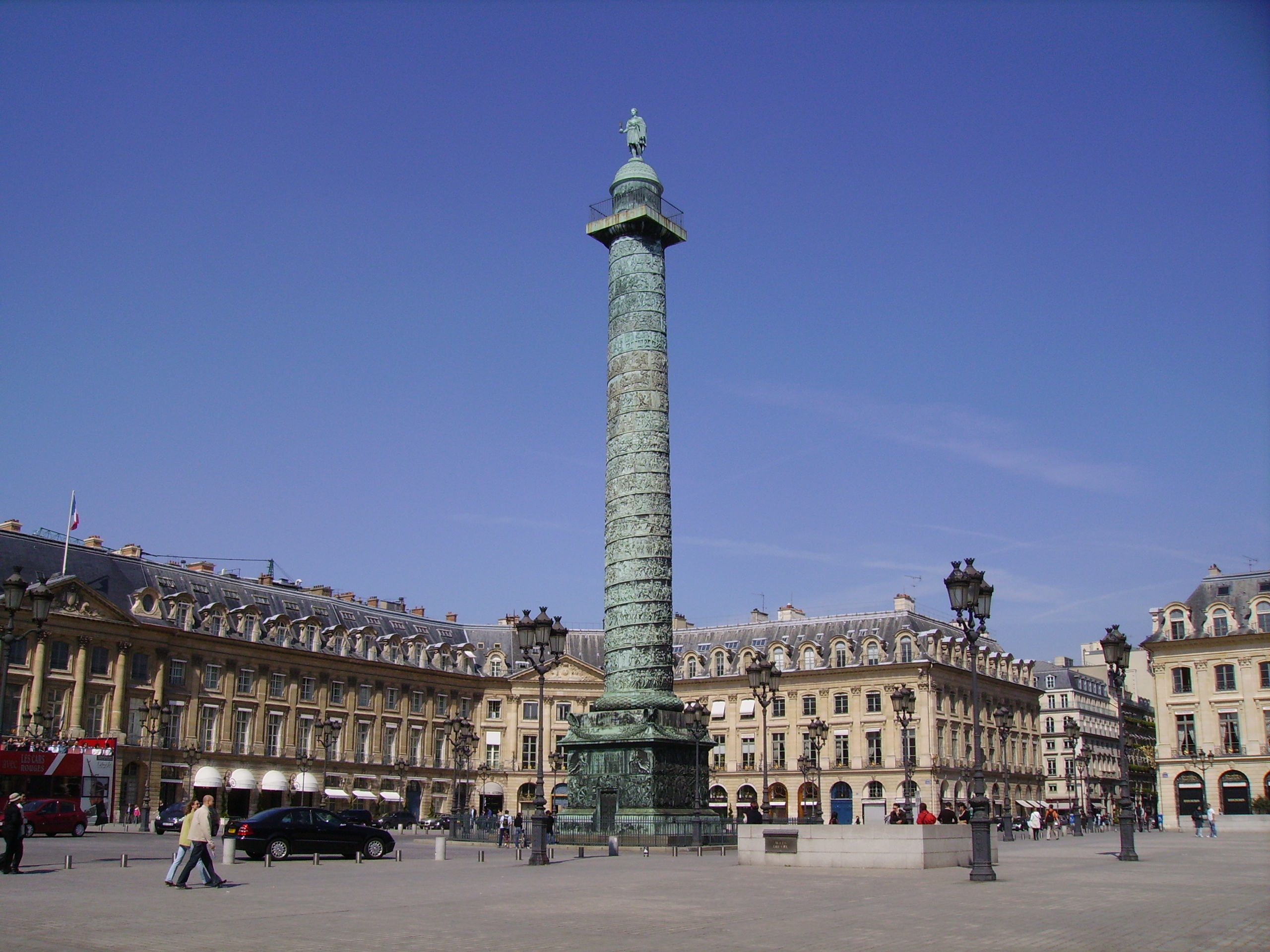
Vendôme Column in Paris – dismantled during the Paris Commune in 1871, reconstructed in 1874

- Soissons Cathedral (after 1918)
- Vendôme Column, Paris
- Spire of Notre-Dame de Paris

=== Georgia ===
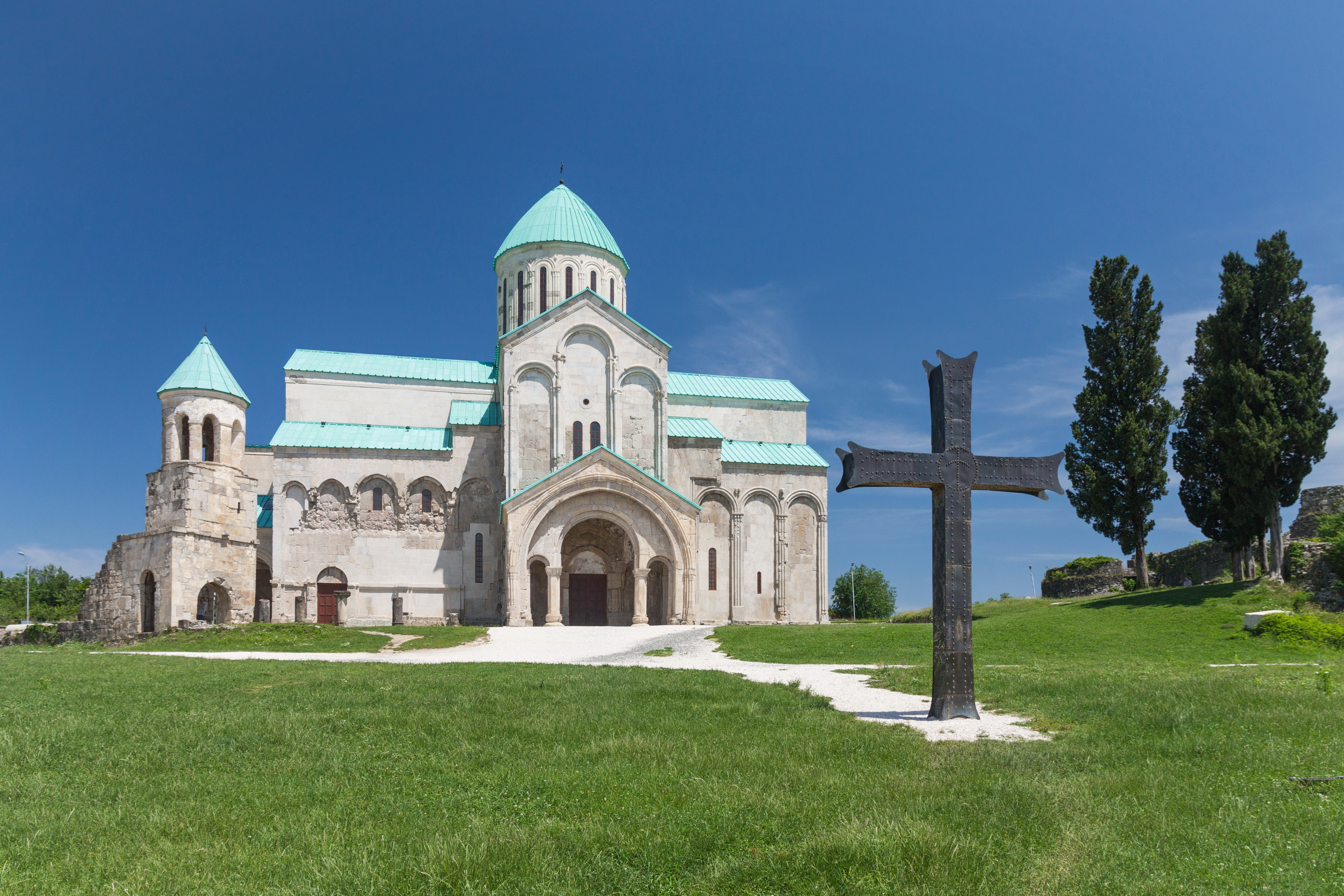

- Bagrati Cathedral

=== Germany ===
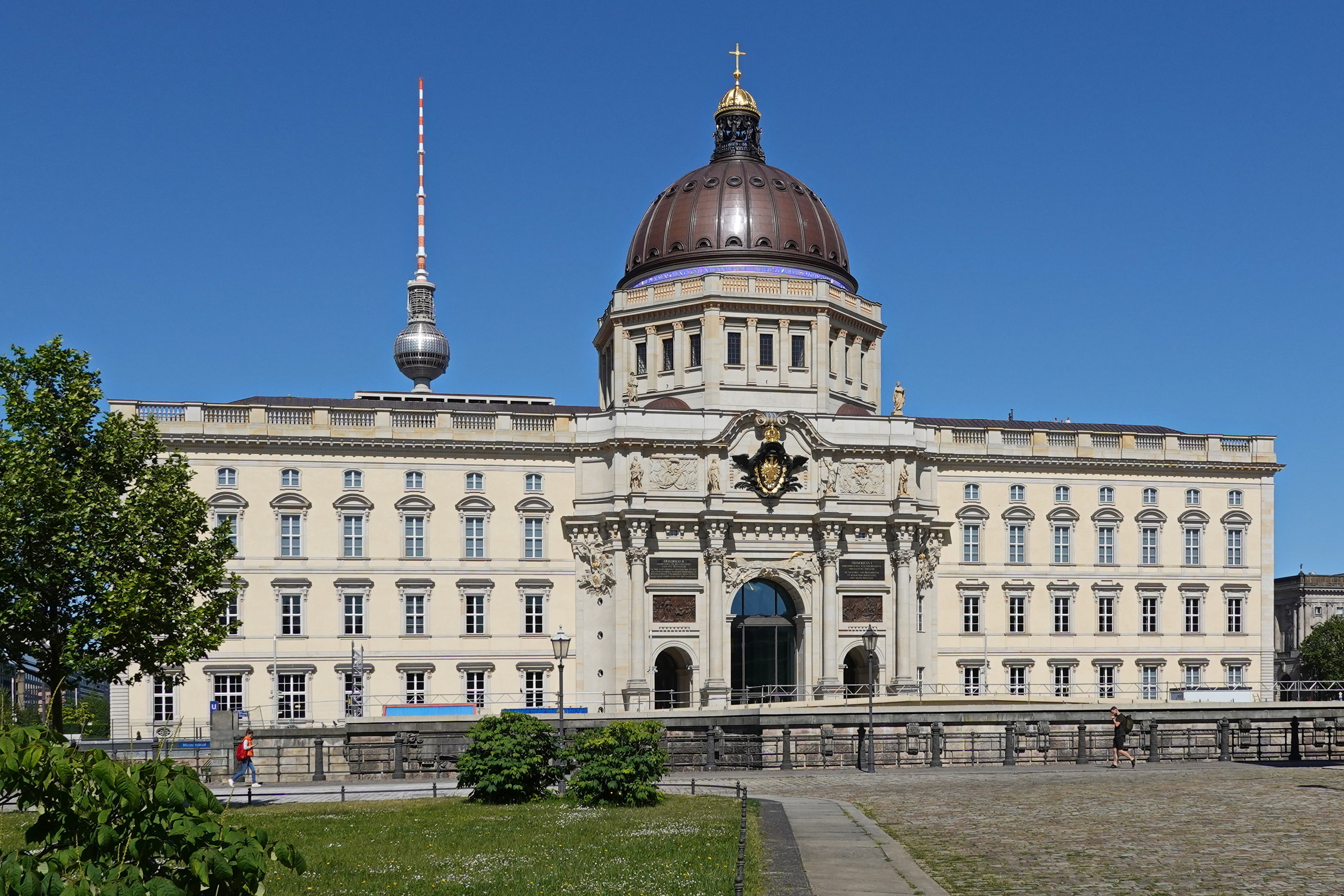
Berlin Palace – demolished by the East German authorities in 1950, reconstructed by 2020

- Berlin Palace
- Leibnizhaus, Hannover (1981)
- Falkenhaus, Würzburg
- Town Hall, Osnabrück
- St. Michael's Church, Hamburg
- Semperoper, Dresden
- Schloss Johannisburg, Aschaffenburg
- Roman limes
- Heilig-Geist-Spital, Nuremberg
- Hildesheim Cathedral
- Buddenbrookhaus, Lübeck
- City Palace, Potsdam
- Münster Cathedral
- Butchers' Guild Hall, Hildesheim (1989)
- Old Castle, Stuttgart
- Dresden Castle
- Dresden Cathedral
- Dresden Frauenkirche
- Munich Residence
- Munich Frauenkirche
- Saarbrücken, Ludwigskirche
- New Frankfurt Old Town

=== Greece ===
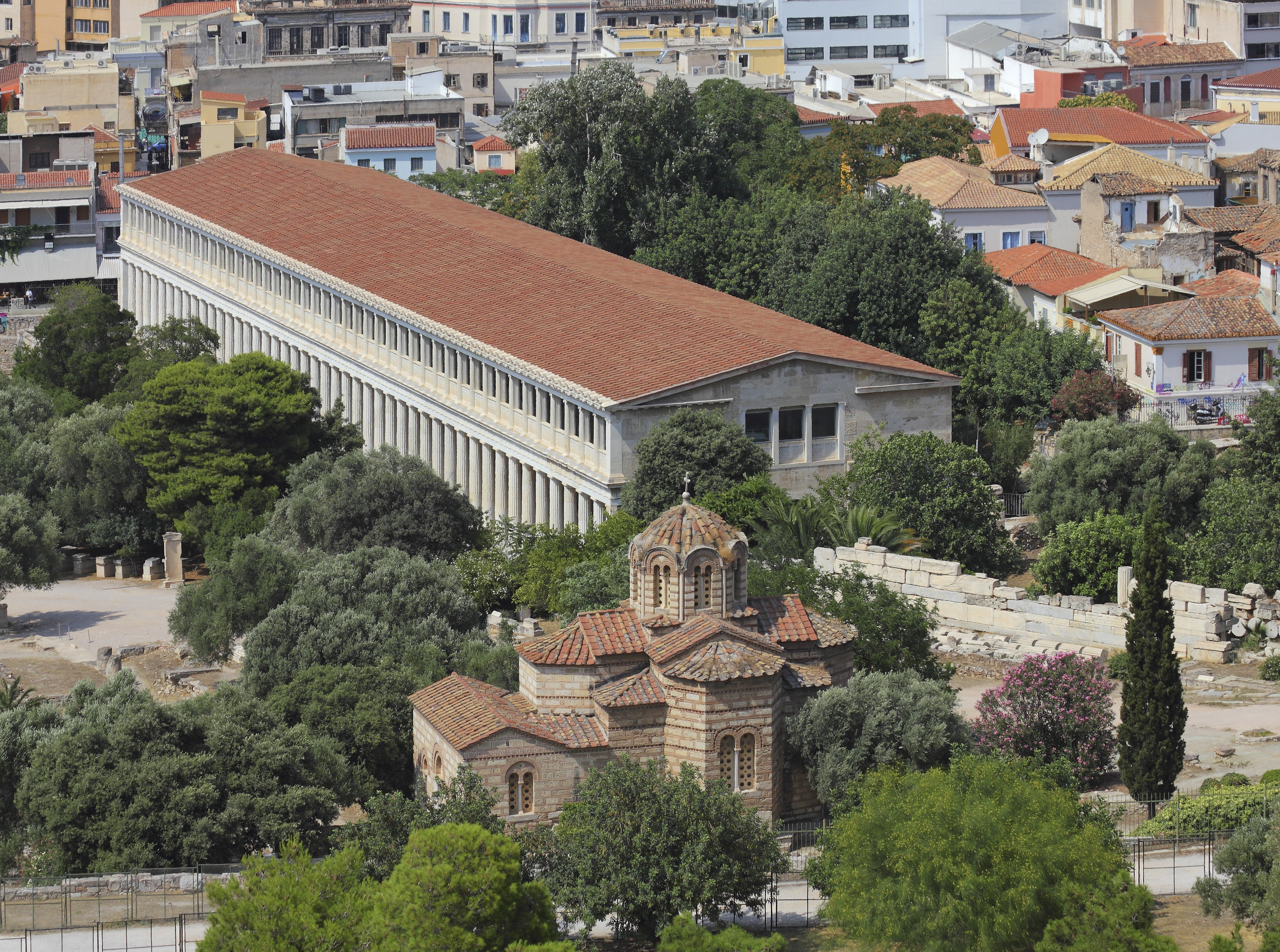
Stoa of Attalos in Athens – burned in 267 AD, reconstructed by 1956

- Stoa of Attalos, Athens (1956)

=== Hungary ===
- Matthias Church, Budapest (1896)
- Buda Castle, Budapest (1952–1985: not true-to-the-original reconstruction of the building destroyed in 1944; since 2019: true-to-the-original reconstruction of some parts of the building)
- Royal Palace, Gödöllő (since 1994)

=== India ===
- Daksheswara Mahadev Temple (1963)
- Tabo Monastery (1983)

=== Iraq ===
- Babylon (1983)

=== Israel ===
- Church of the Flagellation, Jerusalem: Duke Max Joseph in Bavaria financed the purchase of the long-dilapidated chapel by the Custody of the Holy Land and its restoration for worship in 1838. The building, which still exists today, was built in 1927–1929 in the medieval style under the architect Antonio Barluzzi.
- Hurva Synagogue, Jerusalem (2010)

=== Italy ===
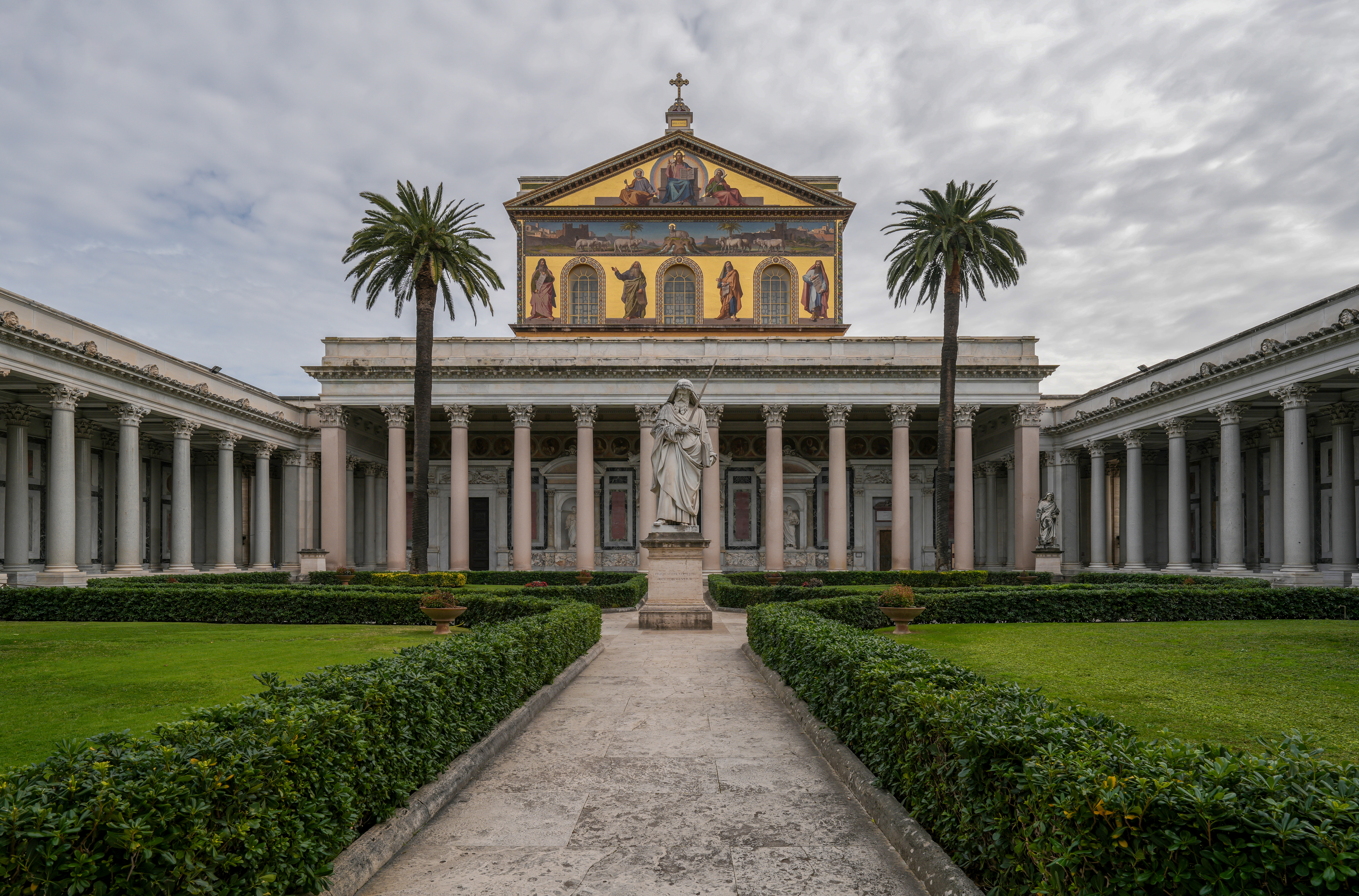
Basilica of Saint Paul Outside the Walls in Rome – burned in 1823, reconstructed by 1840

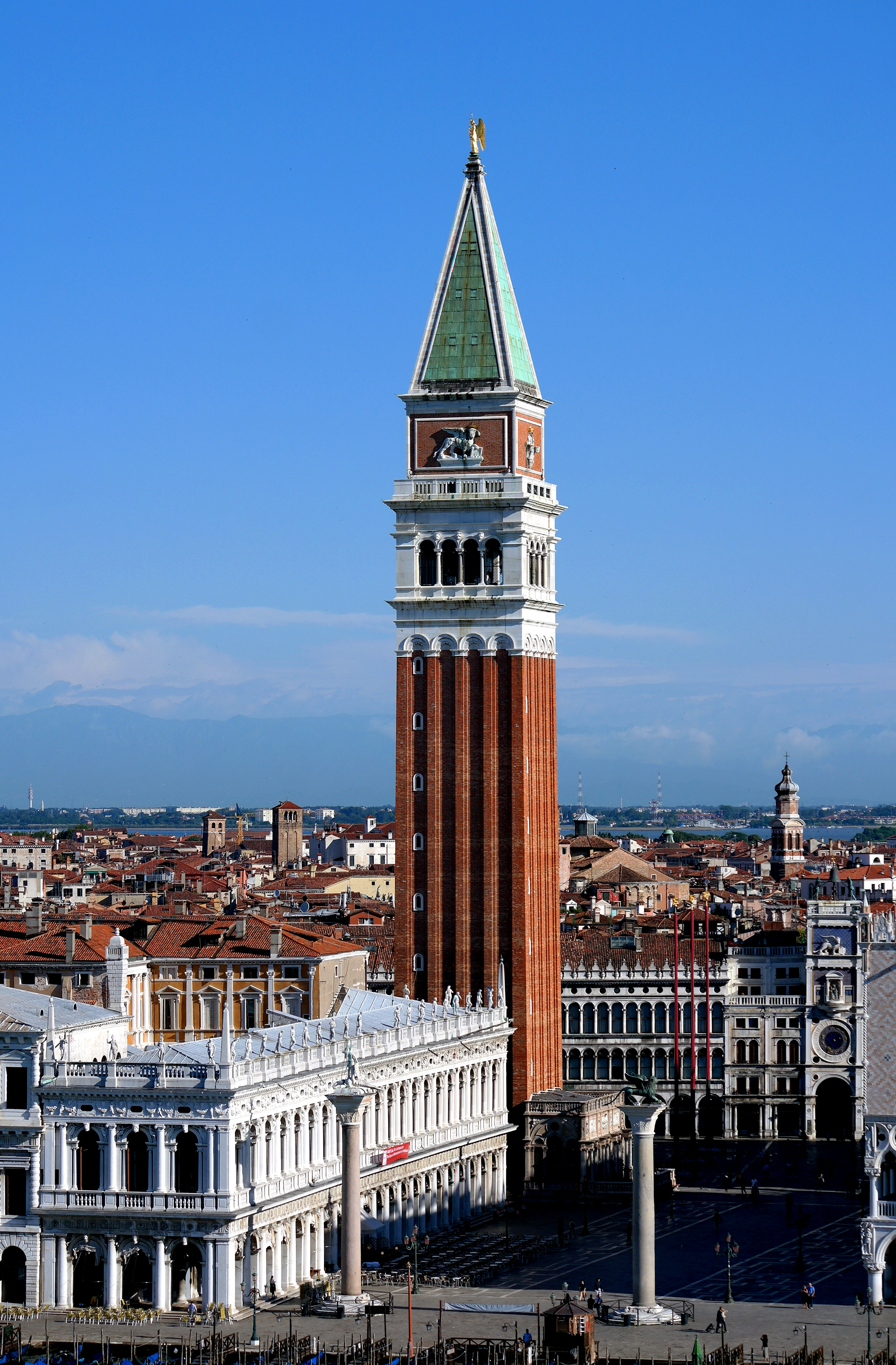
St Mark's Campanile in Venice – collapsed in 1902, reconstructed by 1912, UNESCO World Heritage since 1987

- Abbey of Monte Cassino (1964)
- Basilica of Saint Paul Outside the Walls, Rome: the basilica, destroyed in a fire in 1823, was rebuilt true-to-the-original by 1840.
- Opera house La Fenice, Venice (2003)
- St Mark's Campanile, Venice: the largely true-to-the-original copy of the building, which collapsed in 1902, was rebuilt by 1912.

=== Japan ===
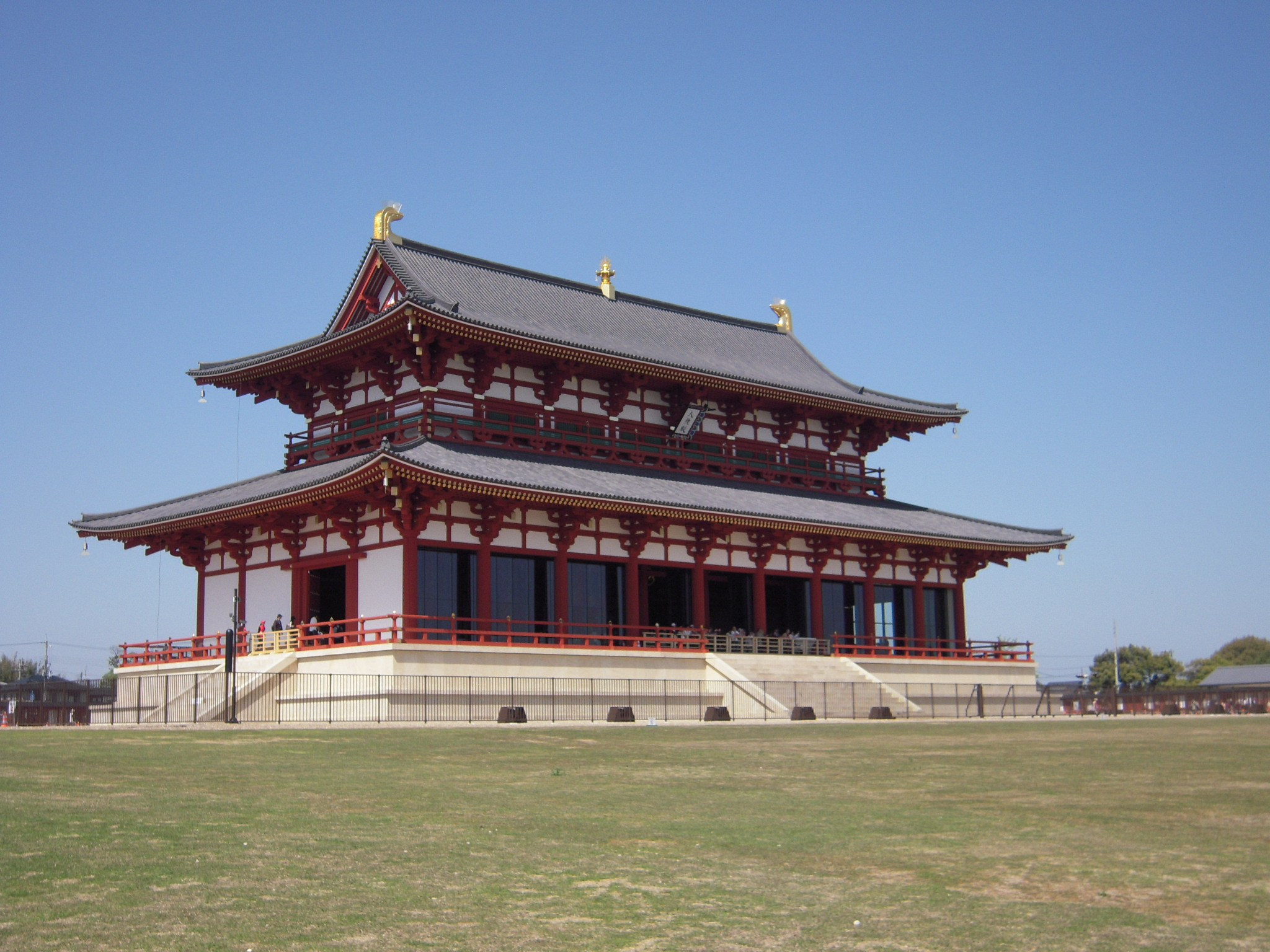
Heijō Palace in Heijō-kyō – abandoned in the 8th century, UNESCO World Heritage since 1998, reconstructed by 2010

- Heijō Palace, Nara, Nara Prefecture

=== Latvia ===
- House of the Blackheads, Riga

=== Lithuania ===
- Palace of the Grand Dukes of Lithuania, Vilnius (2002–2009)
- Trakai Island Castle

=== Malta ===
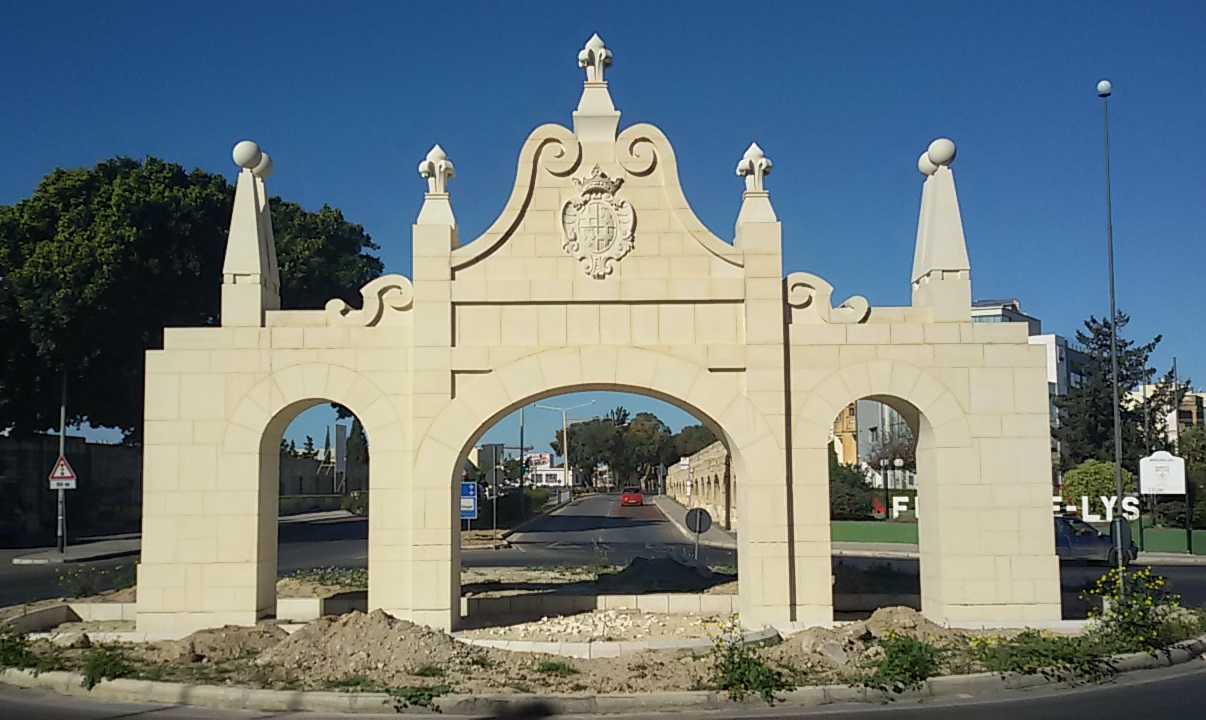
Wignacourt Arch in Fleur-de-Lys and Santa Venera – demolished in 1944, reconstructed in 2015

- Chapel of St Anthony of Padua in Fort Manoel (2009)
- Chapel of St Roche on St Michael's Counterguard (2014)
- Wignacourt Arch (2015)

Plans are also being made for reconstructing the Birgu Clock Tower, which was destroyed in 1942.

=== Poland ===
- Warsaw Old Town, Warsaw
- Sigismund's Column, Warsaw
- St. Kazimierz Church, Warsaw (1947–1953)
- Green Gate, Gdańsk
- Warsaw Barbican (1952–1954)
- St. Alexander's Church, Warsaw (1949–1952)
- Holy Cross Church, Warsaw (1953)
- Church of the Holy Spirit, Warsaw (1956)
- Malbork Castle (1960-1993)
- Royal Castle, Warsaw (1971–1974)
- St. Hyacinth's Church, Warsaw
- St. John's Archcathedral, Warsaw
- St. Florian's Cathedral, Warsaw (1972)

=== Russia ===
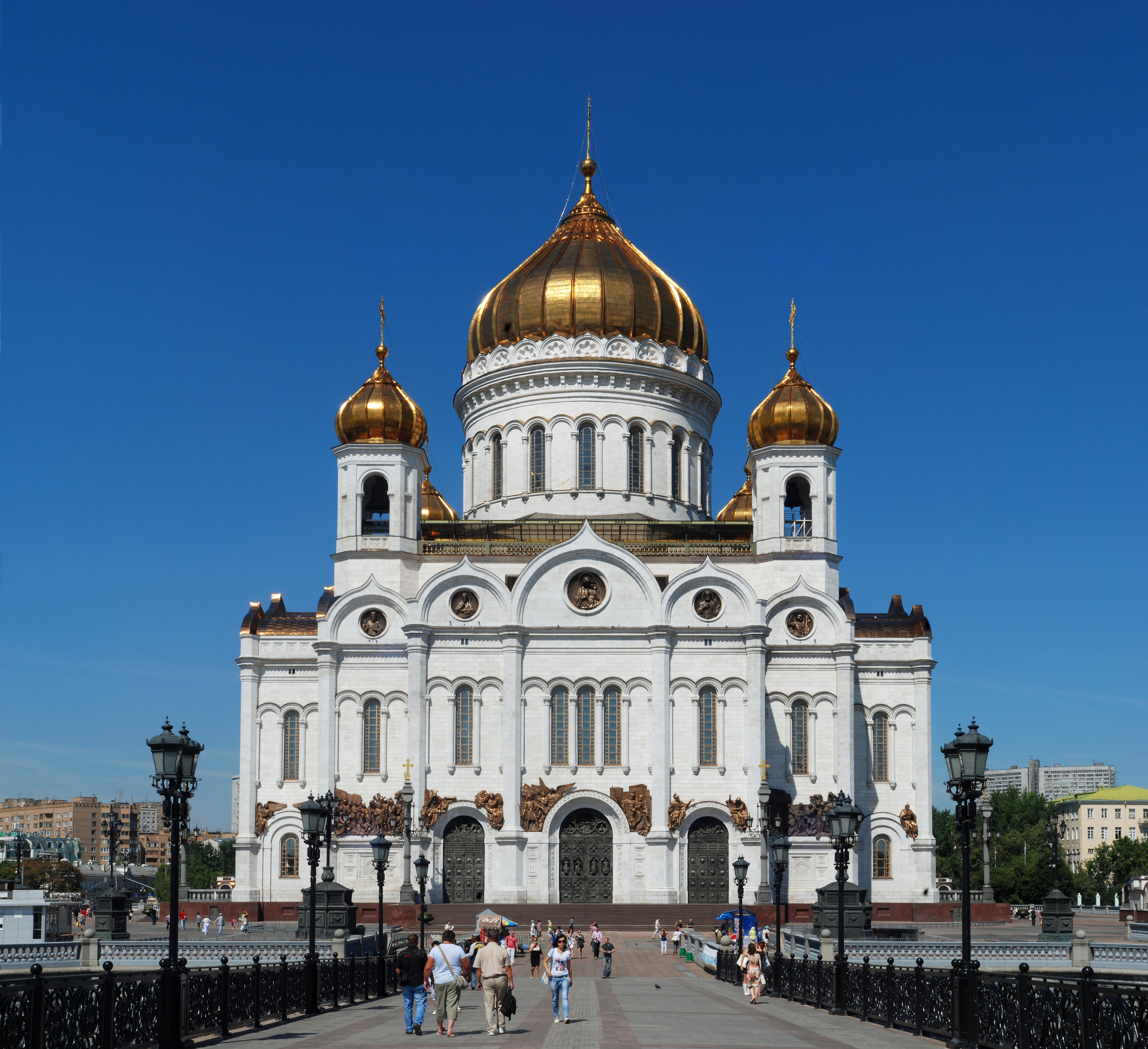
Cathedral of Christ the Savior in Moscow – demolished under Stalin in 1931, reconstructed from 1995 to 2000

- Cathedral of Christ the Saviour, Moscow (2000)
- Kazan Cathedral, Moscow (1993)
- King's Gate, Kaliningrad
- Königsberg Cathedral, Kaliningrad
- Monument to Grand Duke Sergey Alexandrovich, (1998, 2017)

=== Slovakia ===
- Trenčín Castle

=== Serbia ===
- Avala Tower

=== Spain ===
- Alcázar of Toledo: the fortress, which was destroyed in the Spanish Civil War 1936–1939, was subsequently rebuilt largely true-to-the-original.
- German Pavilion of the 1929 International Exposition in Barcelona was reconstructed between 1983 and 1986 by architects Ignasi de Solà-Morales, Cristian Cirici, and Fernando Ramos.

=== Ukraine ===
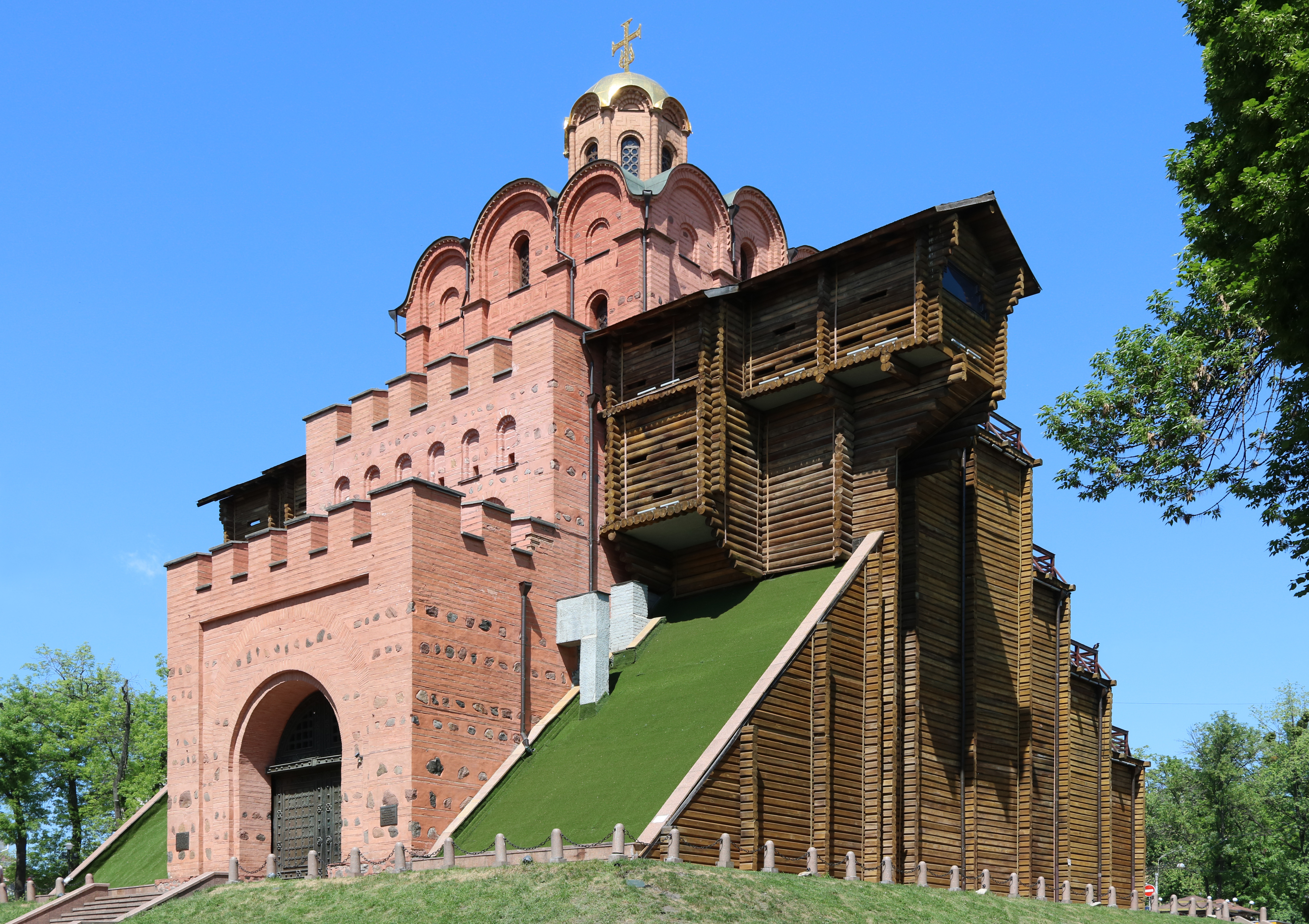
Golden Gate in Kyiv – dismantled in the Middle Ages, reconstructed in 1982

- Golden Gate, Kyiv (1982)
- St. Michael's Golden-Domed Monastery, Kyiv (1999)

=== United Kingdom ===
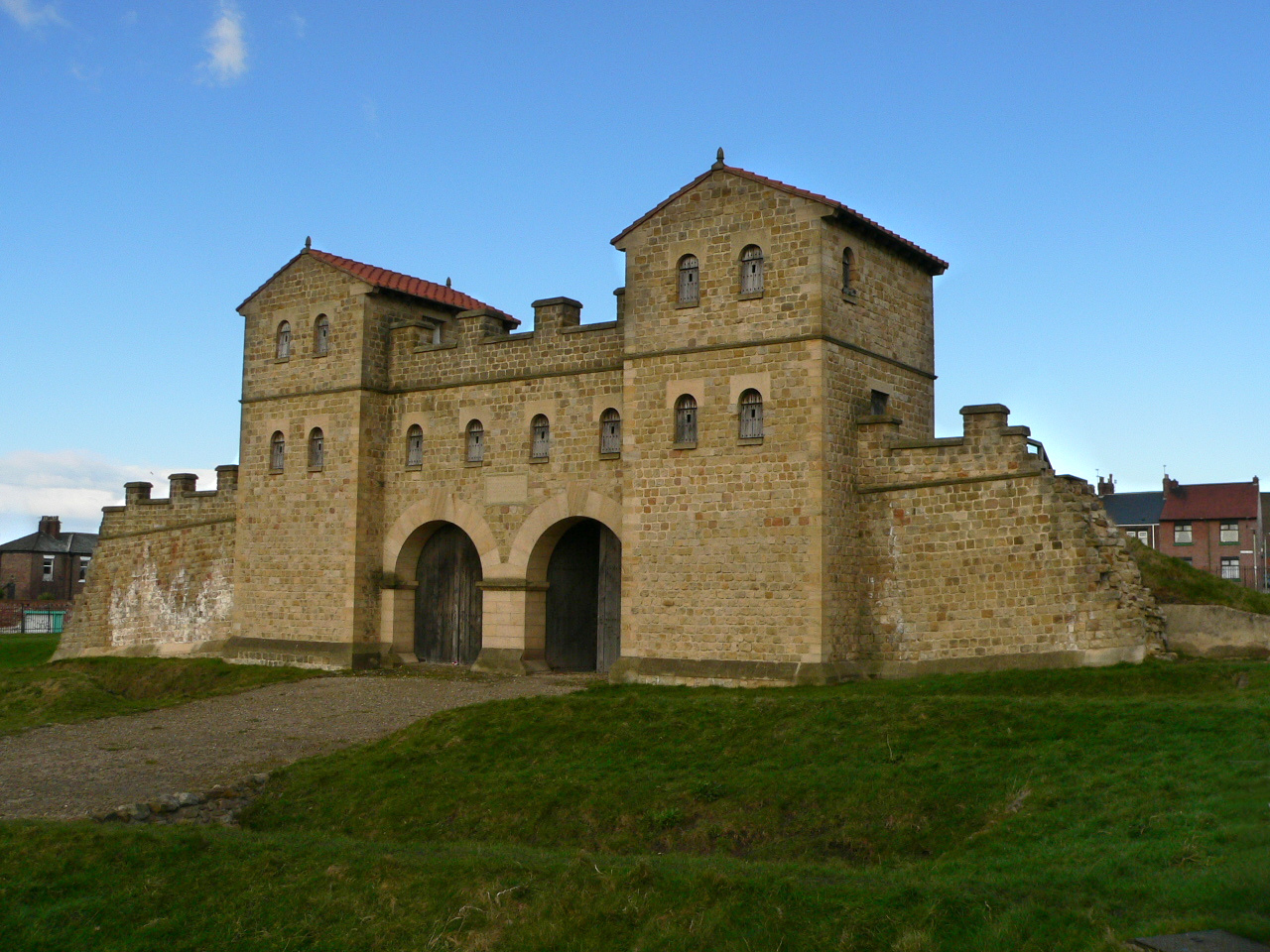
Arbeia Roman Fort in South Shields – reconstructed in 1986

- Arbeia Roman Fort, South Shields, England
- Butser Ancient Farm, England
- Lunt Roman Fort, England
- Shakespeare's Globe, London
- Stonehenge, southern England: Megalithic structures that were largely preserved in the 16th century, most of which were overturned by the 19th century, were re-erected by William Gowland around 1900. The altered positions of the reconstructed structures obscure the original alignment and intended purpose which may have been astro-chronological.

=== United States ===
- Blennerhassett Mansion, Wood, West Virginia (1980s)
- Colonial Williamsburg, Williamsburg, Virginia (mostly since 1920s)
- Governor's Palace, Williamsburg: the palace, which was destroyed by fire in 1781, was rebuilt in 1927–1934 from the perspective of completing the tourist-museum cityscape of Colonial Williamsburg according to old models.
- Nauvoo Temple, Nauvoo, Illinois (2002)
- Palace of Fine Arts, San Francisco, California (1965)
- White House, Washington D.C. (1949–1952)

== Planned or under construction reconstructions ==
- Buddhas of Bamiyan: After the destruction of the UNESCO World Heritage Site by the Taliban in 2001, there were vague plans to reconstruct the monumental statues of gods. Work has since begun on restoring the Buddhas using the process of anastylosis, where original elements are combined with modern material. The restoration of the caves and Buddhas has also involved training and employing local people as stone carvers. The work has come under some criticism.
- Palmyra: After the destruction of the UNESCO World Heritage by Daesh, there were vague plans to restore the ancient oasis city and many other destroyed temples, churches and mosques in Syria and Iraq.
- Old town hall in Halle: considered one of the most important secular buildings in Central Germany, it was badly damaged in an air raid in 1945, and completely demolished by 1950. Currently collecting donations for the reconstruction of the baroque entranceway.
- Saxon Palace in Warsaw: former residence of the kings of Poland, part of the Saxon Axis, redesigned in a classicist style in 1842, destroyed in 1944 under German occupation. In 2018 the Polish government announced that it would reconstruct the palace as a senate building.
- Mercator House in Duisburg: home of the cartographer Gerhard Mercator (1512–1594), destroyed in World War II, foundations uncovered during archaeological excavations in 2012, reconstruction as an educational facility by 2021
- Town hall towers in Frankfurt am Main: Colloquially known as "Langer Franz" and "Kleiner Cohn", destroyed in an air raid in 1944, then covered with emergency roofs. Currently fundraising for the reconstruction of the tower roofs.
- Garrison Church in Potsdam: considered a major work of the European Baroque, it was built by Philipp Gerlach from 1730 to 1735. It burned out in an air raid in 1945 and was blown up in 1968 for ideological reasons. The tower has been under reconstruction since 2017.
- Old Market Square, Potsdam: once considered to be one of the most beautiful squares in Europe, especially in the time of Frederick the Great when many copies of Italian palaces were built there. Burned in an air raid in 1945, and then was demolished for ideological reasons in East Germany. Reconstruction of individual facades has taken place since 2013, including the Barberini Museum.
- Berliner Bauakademie: was considered the original building of modern architecture, erected from 1832 to 1836 by Karl Friedrich Schinkel, burned out in an air raid in 1945 and was demolished in 1962. The building has been sold by the state of Berlin to the federal government which had a resolution in 2016 to reconstruct the building.
- The Temple of Bel, the Temple of Baalshamin and the Monumental Arch in Palmyra, Syria, will be reconstructed using an anastylosis technique involving incorporating the original materials. The temples had been destroyed by the Islamic State of Iraq and the Levant in 2015. Following the recapture of Palmyra by the Syrian Army in March 2016, Director of Antiquities Maamoun Abdelkarim announced the plans for their reconstruction.
- The Acropolis of Athens project began in 1975 intending to reverse the decay of centuries of attrition, pollution, destruction from military actions, and misguided past restorations. The project included the collection and identification of all stone fragments, even small ones, from the Acropolis and its slopes and an attempt was made to restore as much as possible using reassembled original material (anastylosis), with new marble from Mount Pentelicus used sparingly.
- Shuri Castle, the 5th reconstruction of the former Ryukyu Royal Castle is underway after the 2019 fire, with an expected completion in autumn 2026.
- Lighthouse of Alexandria, since 1978 many proposals have been made to replace the lighthouse with a modern reconstruction. In 2015, the Egyptian government and the Alexandria governorate suggested building a skyscraper on the site of the lighthouse as part of the regeneration of the eastern harbour of Alexandria Port.

== See also ==
- Historic preservation
- Building restoration
- Anastylosis, the reconstruction of a ruined building using the original elements to the greatest degree possible
- New Classical Architecture, a movement in architecture that continues the practice of classical architecture to go along with reconstructions
- Ise Grand Shrine in Japan, which is ceremonially rebuilt every 20 years
- Ship replica
- Deconstructivism (architecture)
