= Chorus Association =

Cultural conservation organisation in Venice, Italy

The Chorus Association of Venetian Churches (Italian: Chorus Associazione per le Chiese del Patriarcato di Venezia), often shortened to Chorus Association, is a cultural conservation organisation working within the city of Venice in Italy. It works to safeguard, conserve and restore the artistic, historical and cultural heritage contained within the sixteen Venetian churches that presently constitute its membership.

== Project ==
Chorus was founded in June 1997, set-up by public act as a non-profit association. Its initial members were the priests and rectors of the thirteen founding churches. It was added to Venice City Council's Register of Associations in August 1997 and in December 1999 the Veneto Region recognised it as a legal entity in accordance with Italian Civil Code.

In 2000, the Cassa di Risparmio di Venezia Foundation joined Chorus along with a number of lay persons. The total membership currently stands at nineteen.

Chorus brings together a network of 20 of Venice's churches (see list below) which between them house more than a thousand works of art. The concept has been defined as an "area museum" and allows the latest conservation practices to be applied across the network. The project also follows the concept of "conservation through utilisation" whereby the demand from visitors to view the cultural works that the churches house becomes self-financing, so that maintenance, conservation and enhancement of the history, artwork and heritage can continue to take place.

== Members ==
The 20 churches which are currently members of the Chorus Association are:

- Church of Santa Maria del Giglio
- Church of Santo Stefano
- Church of Santa Maria Formosa
- Church of Santa Maria dei Miracoli
- Church of San Giovanni Elemosinario
- Church of San Polo
- Church of San Giacomo dall'Orio
- Church of San Stae
- Church of Sant'Alvise
- Basilica of San Pietro di Castello
- Church of the Santissimo Redentore
- Church of Santa Maria del Rosario (Gesuati)
- Church of San Sebastiano
- Church of San Giobbe
- Church of Madonna dell'Orto
- Santa Maria dei Carmini
- Church of San Giovanni in Bragora
- Church of San Marcuola
- Church of San Zaccaria
- Church of San Trovaso

== Tourism ==
Chorus encourages visitors to Venice by providing information and standardised payment means at all of the member Churches. It also publishes a guidebook to the churches.

== Map ==
- "Venice Churches Tickets - 16 Historical Venice Churches". MyPass Venezia - All in one app.
