= Theodoros I =

Theodoros I may refer to:

- Patriarch Theodore I of Alexandria, Greek Patriarch of Alexandria in 607–609
- Theodore I of Constantinople, Ecumenical Patriarch in 677–679
- Pope Theodoros I of Alexandria, ruled in 730–742
- Theodore I Laskaris, Emperor of Nicaea in 1204–1221 or 1205–1222
