= Theodore of Alexandria =

Theodore of Alexandria may refer to:

- Patriarch Theodore I of Alexandria, Greek Patriarch of Alexandria in 607–609
- Pope Theodoros I of Alexandria, ruled in 730–742
- Patriarch Theodore II of Alexandria (Coadjutor), Greek Patriarch of Alexandria between the 7th and 8th centuries
- Patriarch Theodore II of Alexandria, Greek Patriarch of Alexandria since 2004
- Pope Tawadros II of Alexandria, ruled since 2012
