= Patriarch Theodore I =

Patriarch Theodore I may refer to:

- Theodore I of Constantinople, Ecumenical Patriarch in 677–679
- Patriarch Theodore I of Alexandria, Greek Patriarch of Alexandria (607–609)
