= Antonio Abbondi =

Italian Renaissance architect and sculptor

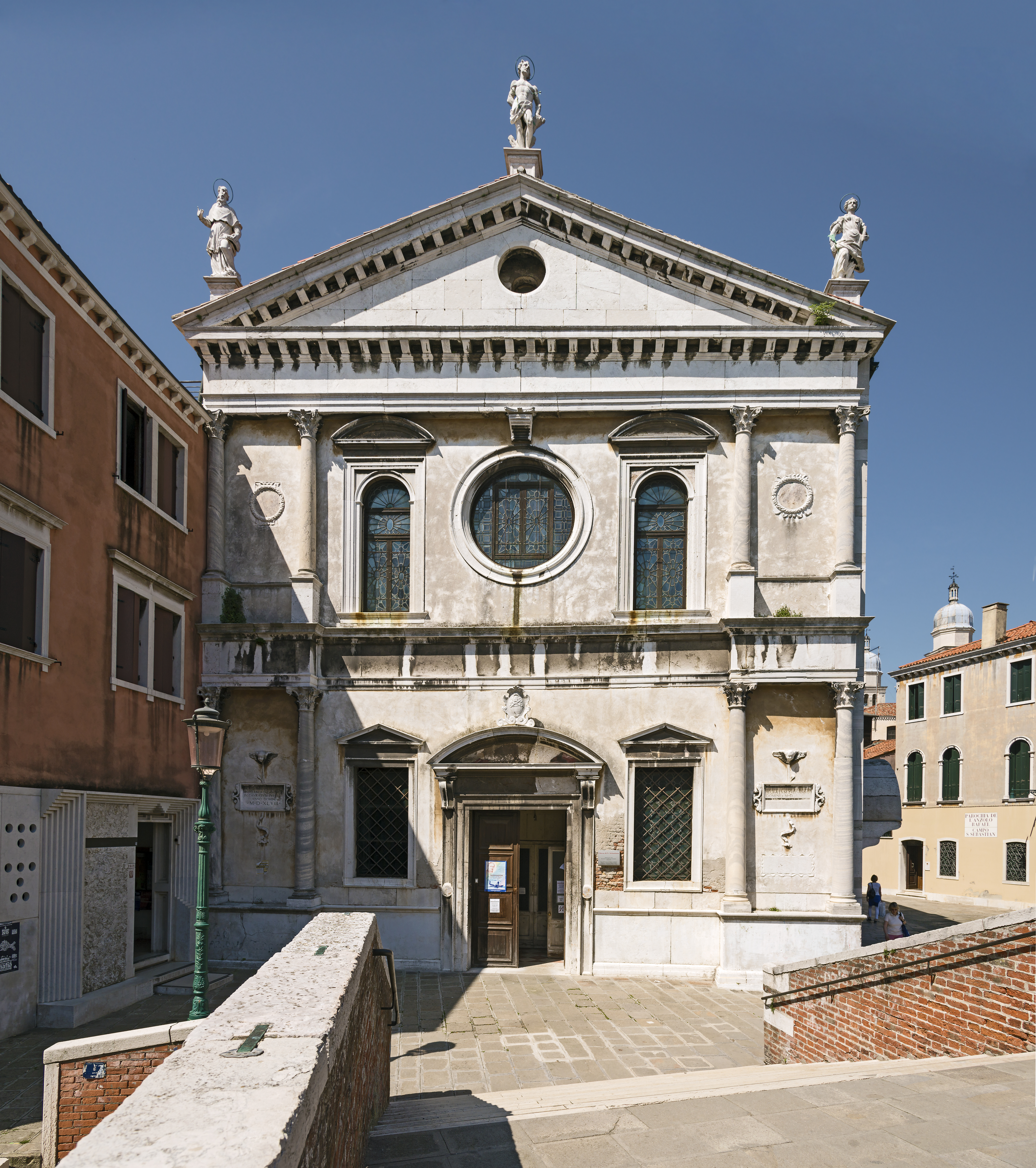
San Sebastiano, Venice

Antonio Abbondi generally known as Scarpagnino (died 1549) was an Italian architect of the Renaissance period, active mainly in Venice.

== Biography ==
Born at Grosio, in Valtellina. In 1505, he became the superintendent of reconstruction for the Fondaco dei Tedeschi in Venice; three years later he was named Proveditore del Sale ("salt curator") of the city.

After a fire destroyed many buildings in the Rialto on 10 January 1514, he played a role in the reconstruction, competing with Alessandro Leopardi, Giovanni Celeste, and Fra Giovanni Giocondo. Abbondi's designs for the Fabbriche Antiche were accepted, and the construction was completed by 1522, including the newly created Palazzo dei Dieci Savi. Also rebuilt was the church of San Giovanni Elemosinario. On 6 October 1527 he was named the proto-maestro for the Scuola di San Rocco, and designed the upper story.

== Bibliography ==
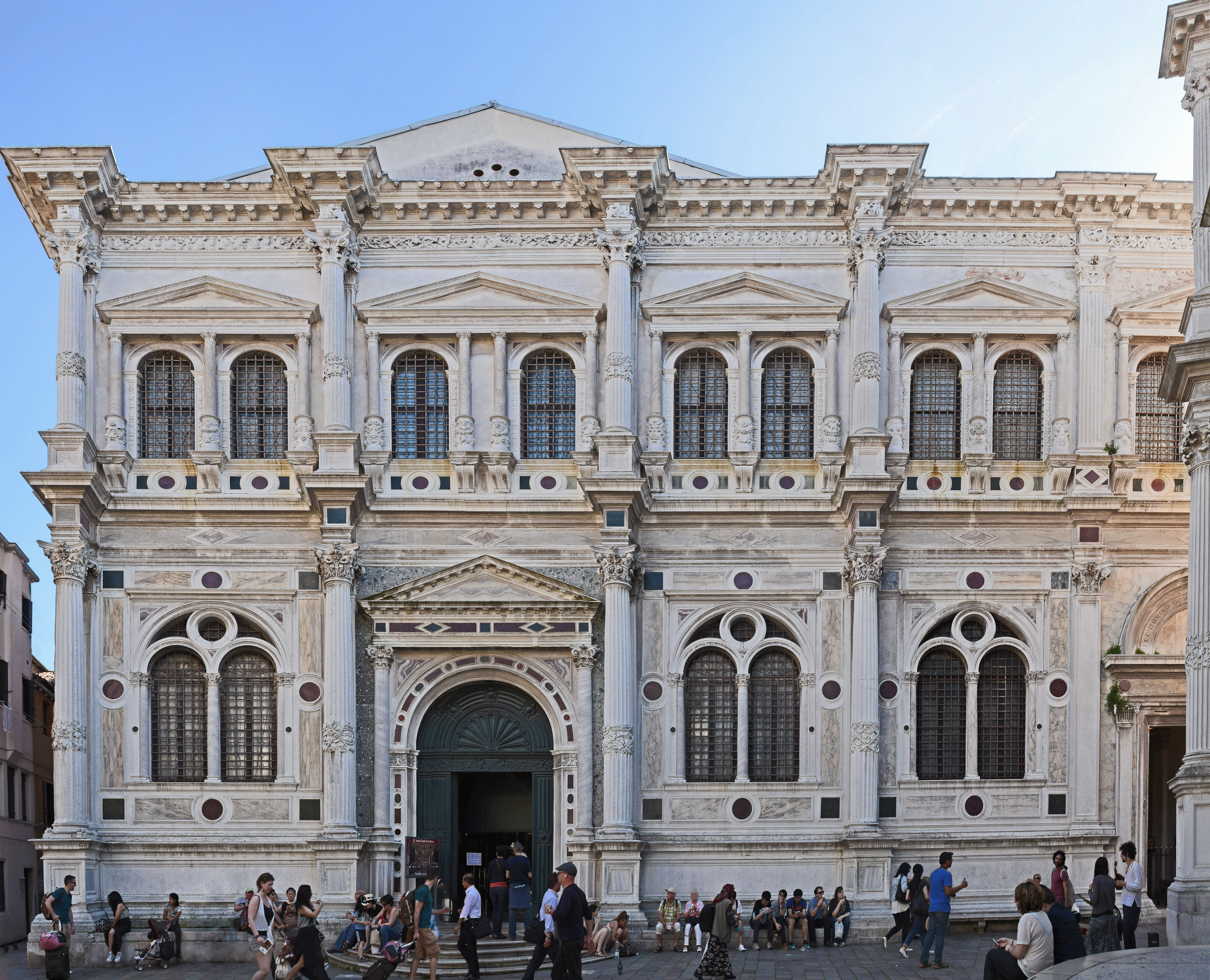
Venice, Scuola Grande di San Rocco

- Sturgis, Russell (1901). A dictionary of Architecture and Building, Biographical, historical, and descriptive (three volumes. Macmillan & Co., London and New York. p. 6.
