= John the Merciful =

7th-century Greek Patriarch of Alexandria

Saint John the Merciful
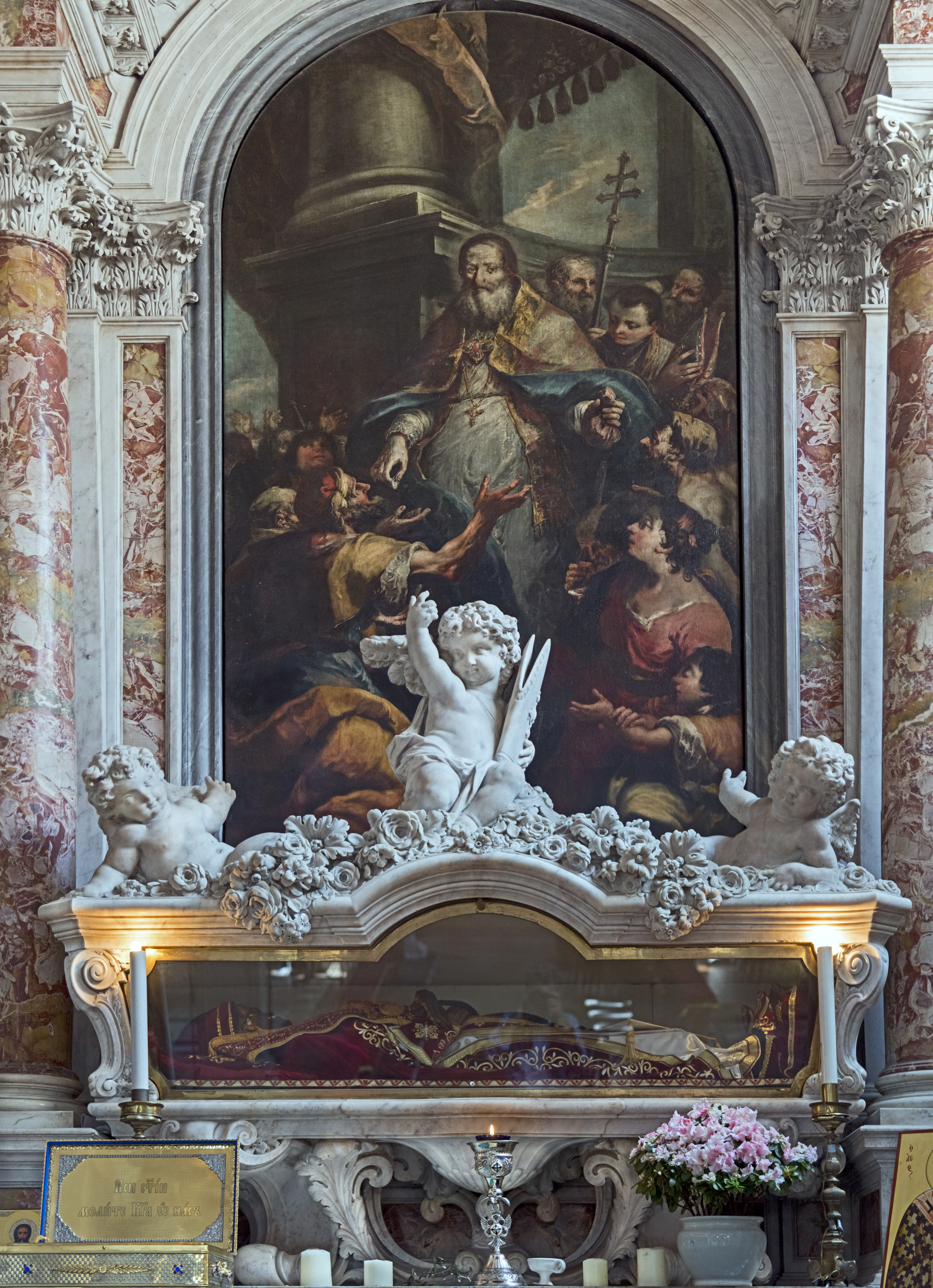
- Saint John the Merciful. Church of San Giovanni Elemosinario

Patriarch of Alexandria
- Born: c. 552; Amathus, Cyprus
- Died: 616–620; Cyprus
- Venerated in: Eastern Orthodox Church; Catholic Church; Coptic Orthodox Church
- Canonized: pre-congregation
- Major shrine: San Giovanni Elemosinario, Venice, Italy
- Feast: 12 November (Eastern Orthodox); 23 January (Roman Catholic); 14 Paopi or 15 Hathor (Coptic Orthodox)
- Attributes: Bishop vestment; Miter; Crosier
- Patronage: Egypt

John V Eleemon (Greek: Ἰωάννης ὁ Ἐλεήμων, romanized: Iōannēs ho Eleēmōn), also known as John the Almsgiver, John the Almoner, John the Compassionate, or John the Merciful, was the Chalcedonian Patriarch of Alexandria from 606 to 616. He was born in Amathus around 560. Originally appointed by Emperor Heraclius, at the end of his life he was obliged to flee back to Cyprus, where he died around 620.

He was unusual for his time in a number of ways. He was a married man with children, was elected bishop as a layman, and became a saint without being a martyr. He is one of few Byzantine era saints to gain a following in the West. He was one of the saints in the Golden Legend. He became famous as the original patron of the Knights Hospitaller. In the British Commonwealth, the "St. John's Ambulance Corps" is named after him.

He is considered a saint in the Catholic Church, the Eastern Orthodox Church and the Coptic Orthodox Church. He is also the patron saint of Casarano, Italy and Limassol, Cyprus.

His "life" was written by his contemporary Leontius, bishop of Neapolis in Cyprus, who seems to have known him personally.

== Biography ==
=== Early life ===
John was born in Amathus to Epiphanius, the governor of Cyprus, and came from a noble family. In his early years, he married and had children, but after the death of his wife and children, he devoted himself to religious life.

=== Patriarch of Alexandria ===
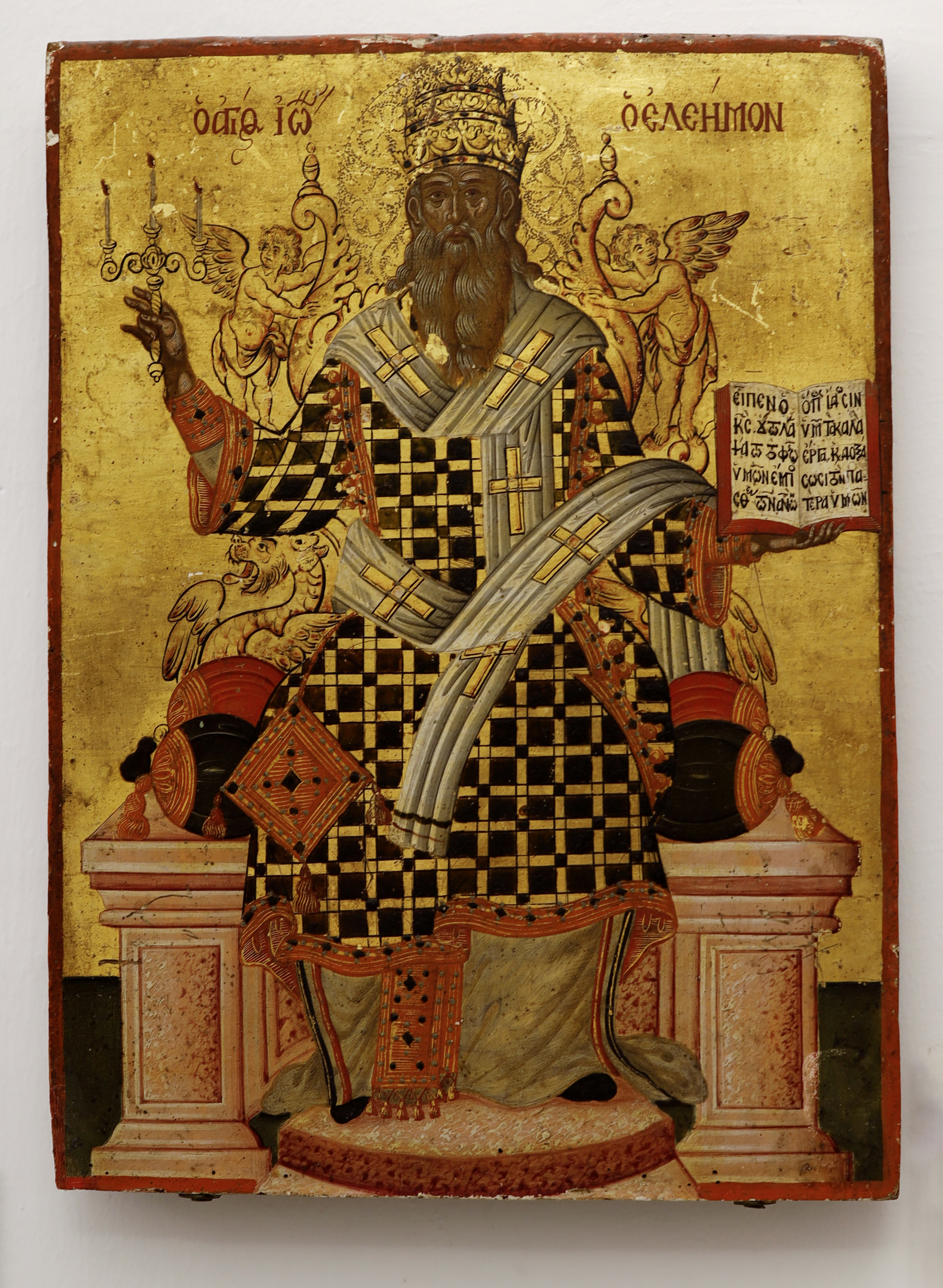
John the Merciful, by an unknown Cretan-Venetian painter, second half of the 17th century. Museo Mandralisca, Cefalù.

After the death of Patriarch Theodore, the people of Alexandria requested Emperor Phocas to appoint John as his successor, which he did. One of John's first actions was to compile a list of several thousand needy individuals, whom he took under his personal care. He always referred to the poor as his "lords and masters" in recognition of their spiritual influence. He helped people from all walks of life who were in need.

John was also a reformer. He combated simony and promoted religious education to fight heresy. He reorganized the system of weights and measures to benefit the poor and took steps to eliminate corruption among officials. During his tenure, the number of churches in Alexandria increased from seven to seventy.

A notable episode of his patriarchate involved Vitalis of Gaza, a monk who ministered to the prostitutes of the city. John showed prudence by not punishing Vitalis, who was known for visiting the city's seedy areas, and his judgment was later vindicated when Vitalis's mission of mercy became widely known.

=== Death and veneration ===
John died in Cyprus sometime between 616 and 620.

His remains were moved first to Constantinople, then in 1249 to Venice, where a church, San Giovanni Elemosinario, was dedicated to him. His relics, however, are preserved in San Giovanni in Bragora.

In 1489, Sultan Bayezid II sent a relic of John to King Matthias Corvinus of Hungary. It was placed in the private Royal Chapel of Buda Castle, which was dedicated to him. Later, the relic was transferred to the St. John the Merciful Chapel in St. Martin's Cathedral in Bratislava, Slovakia.

A church in Cospicua, Malta, is dedicated to him, and one of the bastions of the Santa Margherita Lines in the same city also bears his name.

Although he was Chalcedonian, John came to be venerated as a saint even by the Coptic Orthodox Church. Ibn Kabar records his feast day as 14 Paopi, while the Ethiopian Synaxarium, agreeing with the Greek Menaia, gives 15 Hathor, corresponding to 11 November.

== Anecdotes from the Life by Leontius ==
In his youth John had had a vision of a beautiful maiden with a garland of olives on her head, who said that she was Compassion, the eldest daughter of the Great King. This had evidently made a deep impression on John's mind, and, now that he had the opportunity of exercising benevolence on a large scale, he soon became widely known all over the East for his liberality towards the poor.

A shipwrecked merchant was thus helped three times, on the first two occasions apparently without doing him much good; the third time however, John fitted him out with a ship and a cargo of wheat, and by favourable winds he was taken as far as Britain, where, as there was a shortage of wheat, he obtained his own price.

Another person, who was not really in need, applied for alms and was detected by the officers of the palace; but John merely said "Give unto him; he may be Our Lord in disguise." He visited the hospitals three times every week, and he freed a great many slaves. John is said to have devoted the entire revenues of his see to the alleviation of those in need. A rich man presented him with a magnificent bed covering; he accepted it for one night, but then sold it, and disposed of the money in alms. The rich man "bought in" the article, and again presented it to John, with the same result. This was repeated several times; but John drily remarked: "We will see who tires first."

Another instance of his piety was that he caused his own grave to be dug, but only partly so, and appointed a servant to come before him on all state occasions and say "My Lord, your tomb is unfinished; pray give orders for its completion, for you know not the hour when death may seize you." When the Sassanids sacked Jerusalem in 614, John sent large supplies of food, wine, and money to the fleeing Christians. But eventually the Persians occupied Alexandria, and John himself in his old age was forced to flee to his native country, where he died.

== Related works ==
A hagiographical biography was written by his contemporary Leontios of Neapolis.

== See also ==
- John the New Merciful

Preceded by Theodore I	Greek Patriarch of Alexandria; 610–619	Succeeded by George I
