= San Sebastiano, Venice =

16th-century Roman Catholic church in Venice, Italy

Chiesa di San Sebastiano Church of San Sebastiano
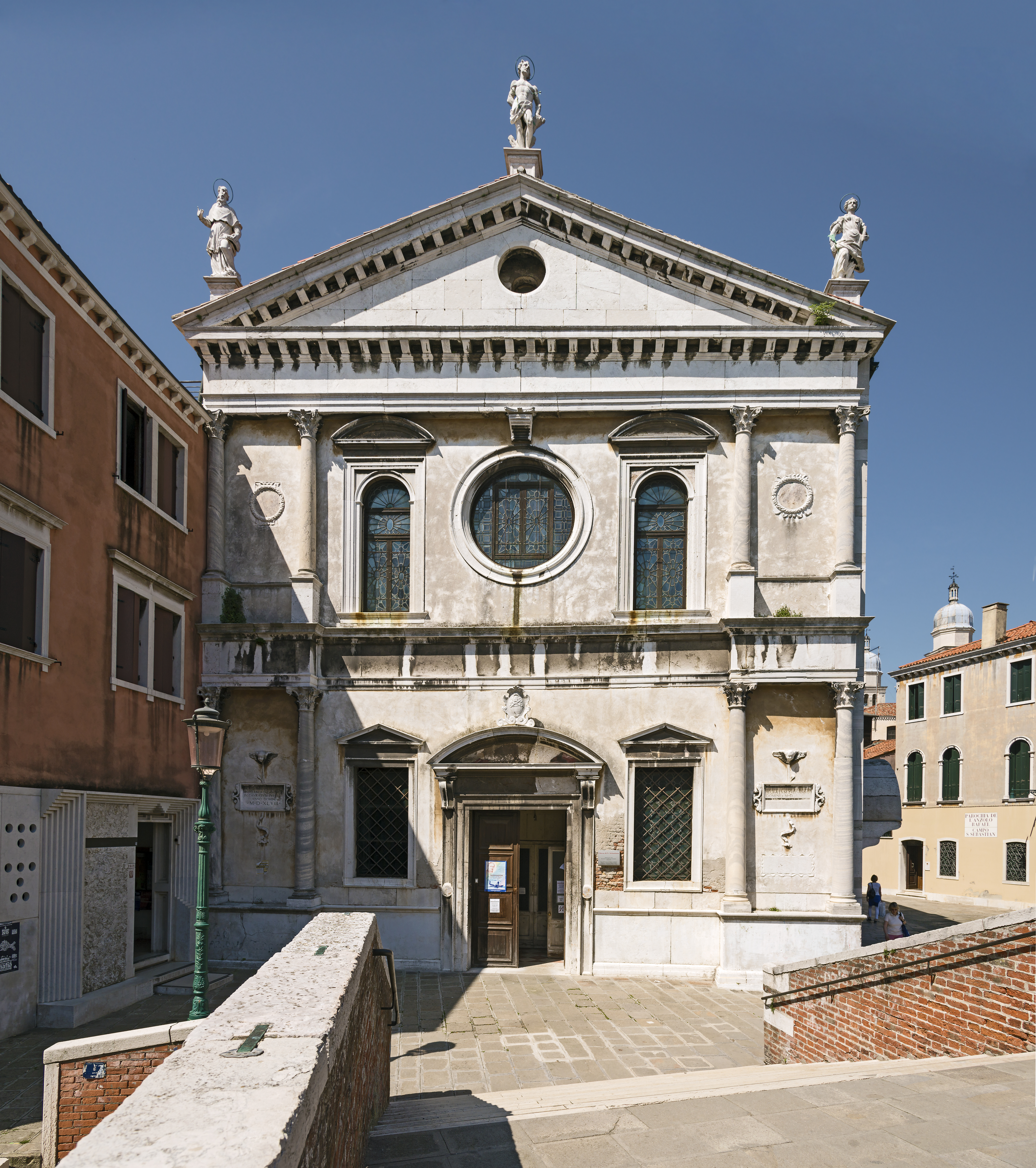
- Facade

- Location within Venice Location within Italy

Religion
- Affiliation: Roman Catholic
- Year consecrated: 1562
- Status: Active

Location
- Location: Dorsoduro, Venice, Italy
- Coordinates: 45.432°N 12.320°E

Architecture
- Architect: Antonio Abbondi
- Type: Church
- Style: Renaissance
- Groundbreaking: 1506
- Completed: 1548

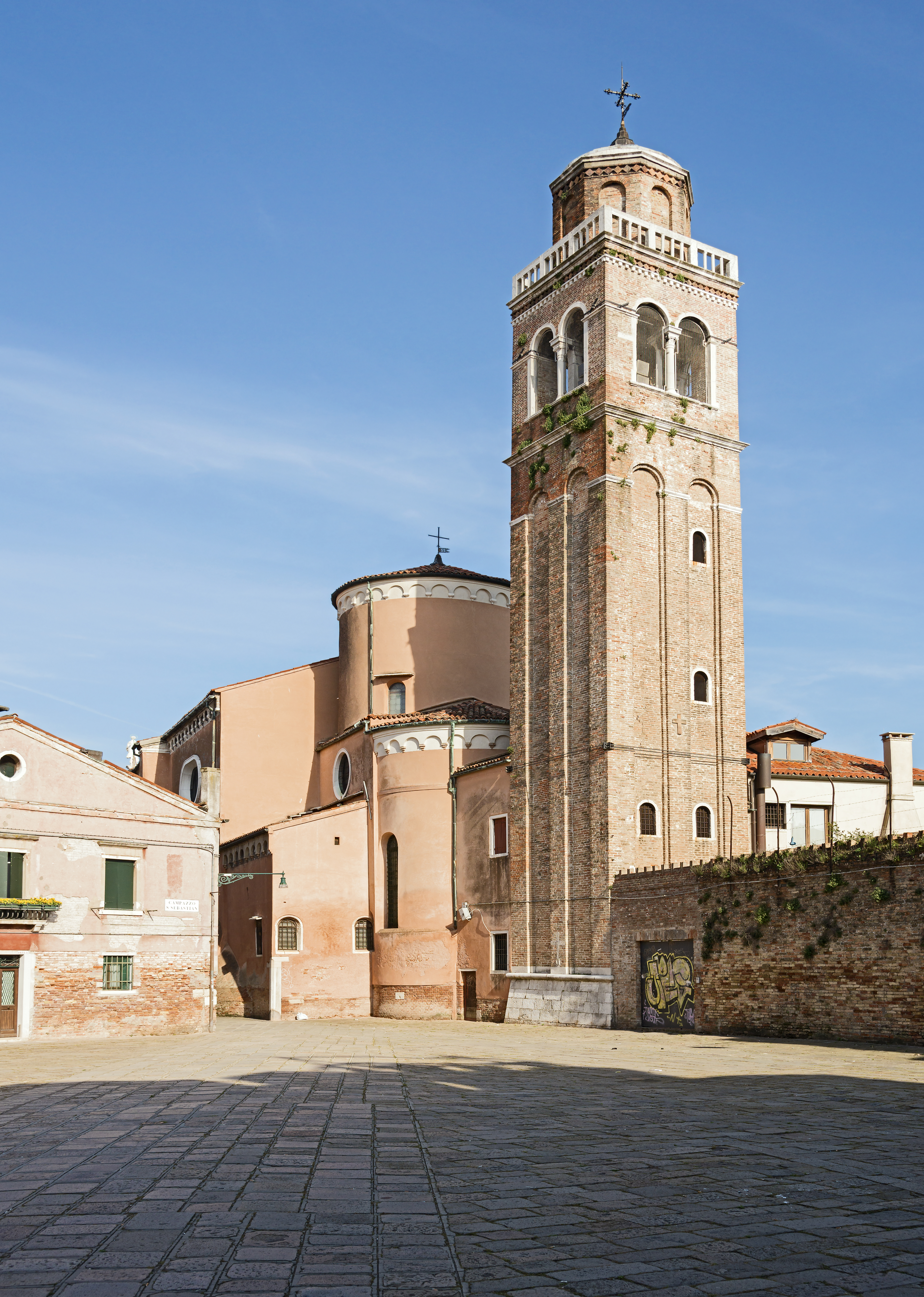
Bell tower and apse.

The Chiesa di San Sebastiano (English: Church of Saint Sebastian) is a 16th-century Roman Catholic church located in the Dorsoduro sestiere of the Italian city of Venice. The church houses a cycle of paintings by the artist Paolo Veronese, as well as paintings by Tintoretto and Titian. The church is a member of the Chorus Association of Venetian churches. It stands on the Campo di San Sebastiano by the Rio di San Basilio, close to the Giudecca Canal. It is one of the five votive churches in Venice, each one built after the passing of a plague through the city. Following construction, the church was dedicated to a saint associated with the disease; in this case St. Sebastian.

== History ==
San Sebastiano is located on the site of a former hospice which was founded by the confraternity of Gerolimine fathers in 1393. Close to the hospice was an Oratory, built in 1396, and dedicated to Santa Maria Full of Grace and Justice. This was later expanded, and in 1468 was converted into a church dedicated to Saint Sebastian the martyr who was one of the chief patrons against plague and pestilence in Europe. The church is therefore regarded as one of the great Plague-Churches of Venice, built to temper divine punishment, as the plague was viewed in the Middle Ages.

Starting in 1506, a number of alterations, including restructuring and enlargement overseen by the architect Antonio Abbondi (known as Scarpagnino), gave the church its current appearance. The expansion was completed in 1548, and the church was finally consecrated in 1562. It has a single-nave layout designed on a Latin cross. It has an atrium, above which is a raised choir, and culminates in an apsidal presbytery under a cupola. The architectural style of the church is Renaissance. A restoration project was undertaken in 1867.

== Exterior ==
San Sebastiano has a plain façade containing, on the pediment's apex, the figure of St. Sebastian wounded by arrows. Close to the door are small figures of St. Sebastian and St. Jerome, the two saints most closely associated with the church.

== Interior ==
Following a commission by Brother Bernardo Torlioni, the Verona-born painter Paolo Veronese spent three periods between 1555 and 1570 decorating various parts of the interior of San Sebastiano. This included paintings, ceiling canvases and frescoes on the nave and altar walls. Veronese also decorated parts of the sacristy and choir, as well as completing the organ decorations and a large altar piece.

The nave's sectioned ceiling contains three paintings depicting episodes from the Book of Esther which Veronese completed in 1556. The paintings behind the choir depict the life of St Sebastian to whom the church is dedicated. The organ doors and frontal contain three pieces: The Presentation of Jesus in the Temple; The Washing of Sacrificial Animals in the Temple; and The Nativity. Veronese also painted an Assumption of the Virgin in the cupola but this was destroyed in the 18th century.

The painting standing behind the high altar was the last work completed by Veronese in the church. It is a scene depicting Madonna in Glory with St Sebastian and other Saints and was completed in 1570. The painting is enclosed in a multi-coloured marble frame of the artist's own design which was commissioned by a Venetian noblewoman, Lise Querini, in 1559. The conception and execution of the painting by Veronese would have coincided with the final sessions of the Council of Trent which published a series of decrees in 1564. These decrees condemned Protestant iconoclasm and renewed earlier emphasis on the inspirational value (namely through scenes of martyrdom) of saints' images.

Following his decades of work within the church, on his death, Veronese was entombed there in 1588. The tomb is located to the left of the sanctuary.

Other notable works found in the church include Titian's St Nicolas (1563) and works by Paris Bordone, Jacopo Sansovino, Palma il Giovane and Alessandro Vittoria. In the sacristy there are works by Jacopo Tintoretto and Bonifacio de' Pitati.

Veronese paintings in San Sebastiano

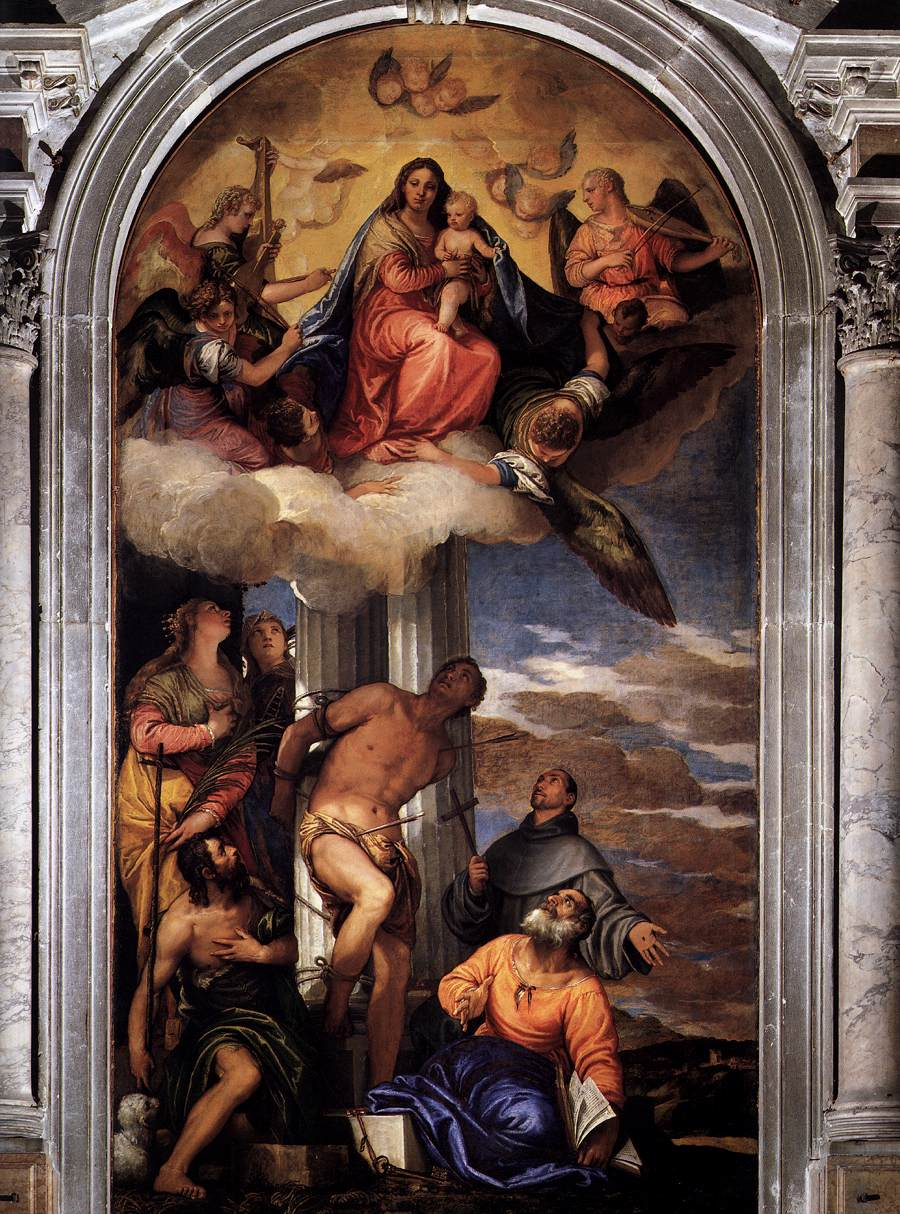
Virgin Assumed with Saints

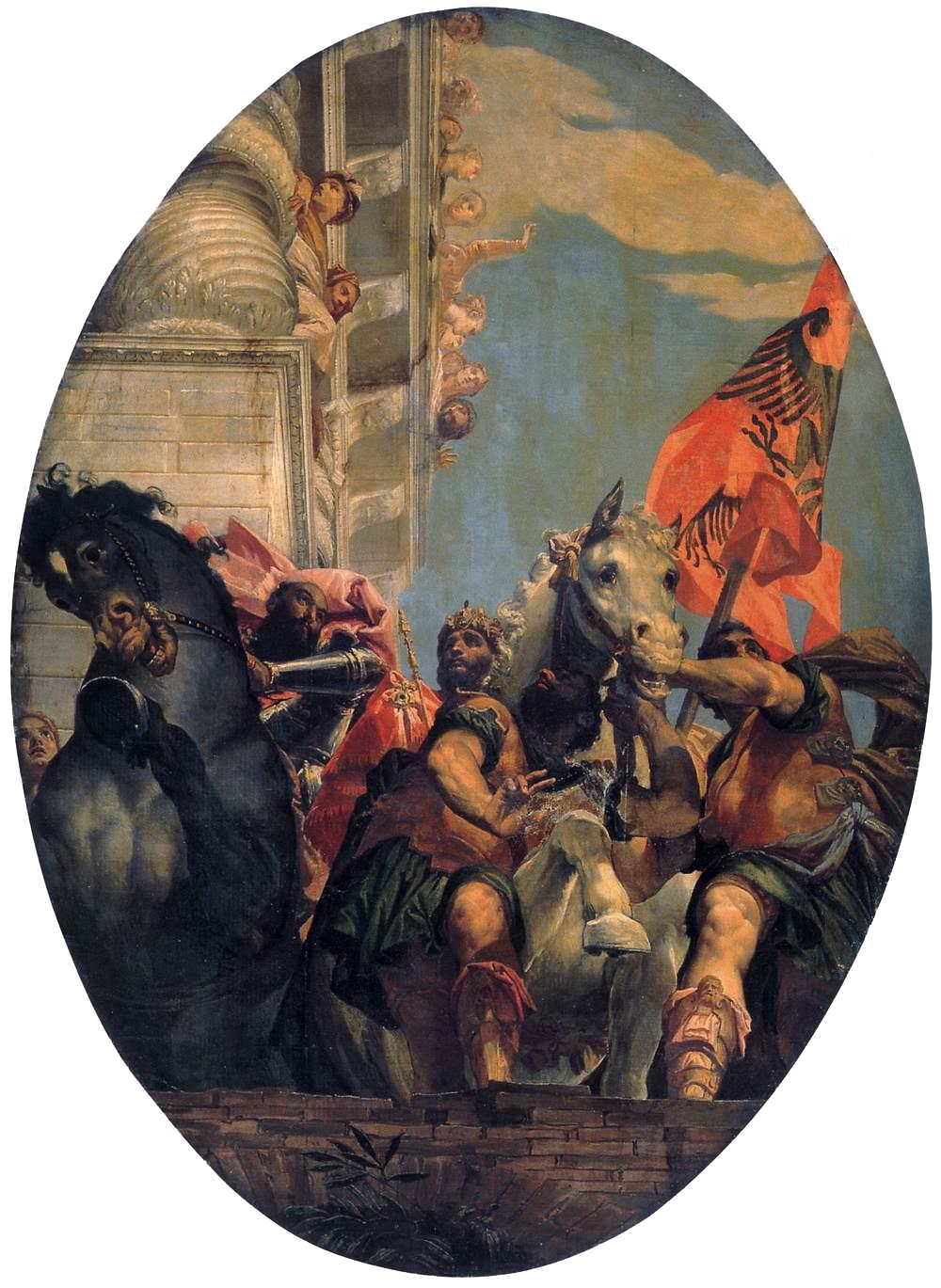
Triumph of Mordecai

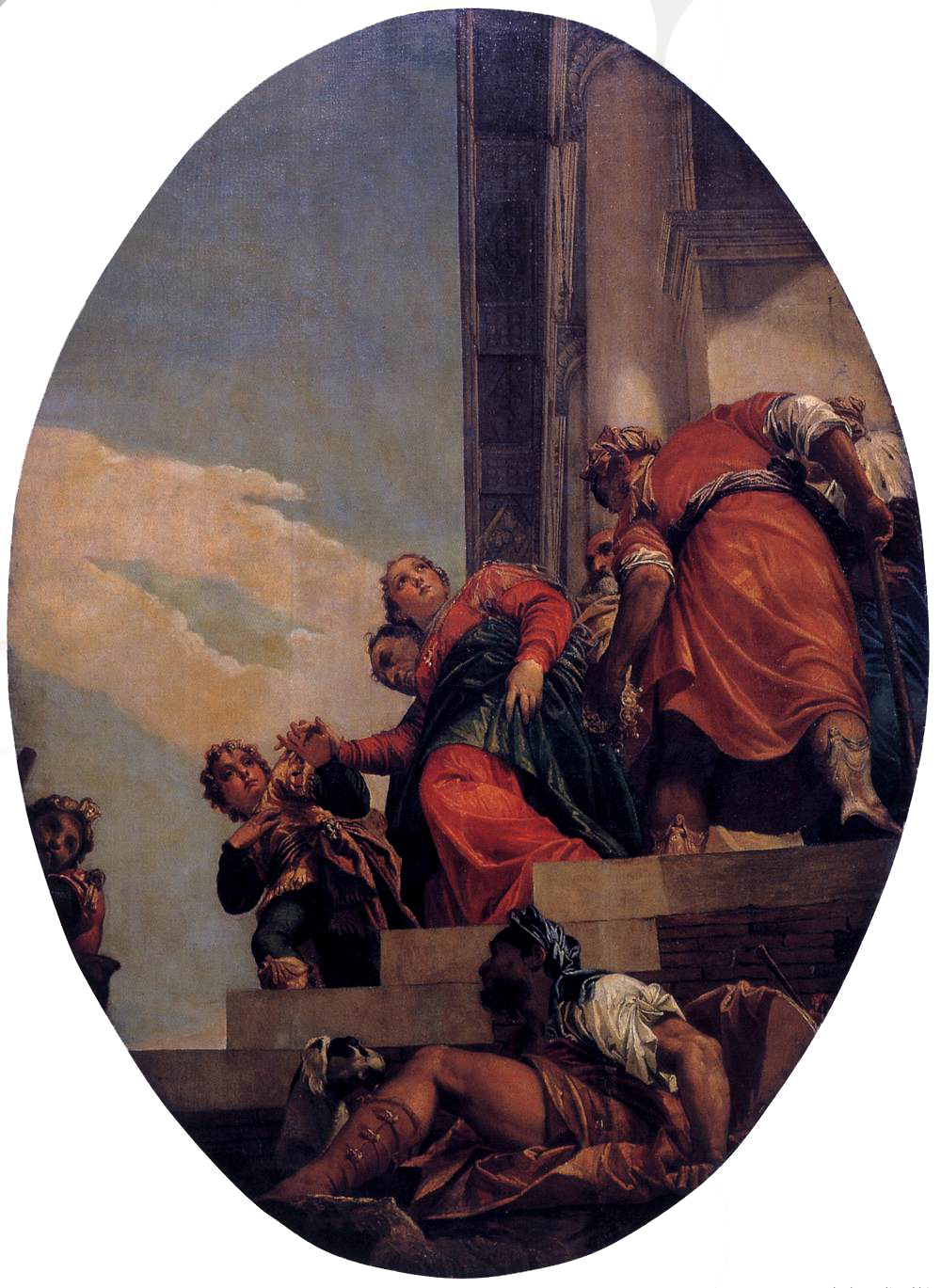
Banishment of Vashti

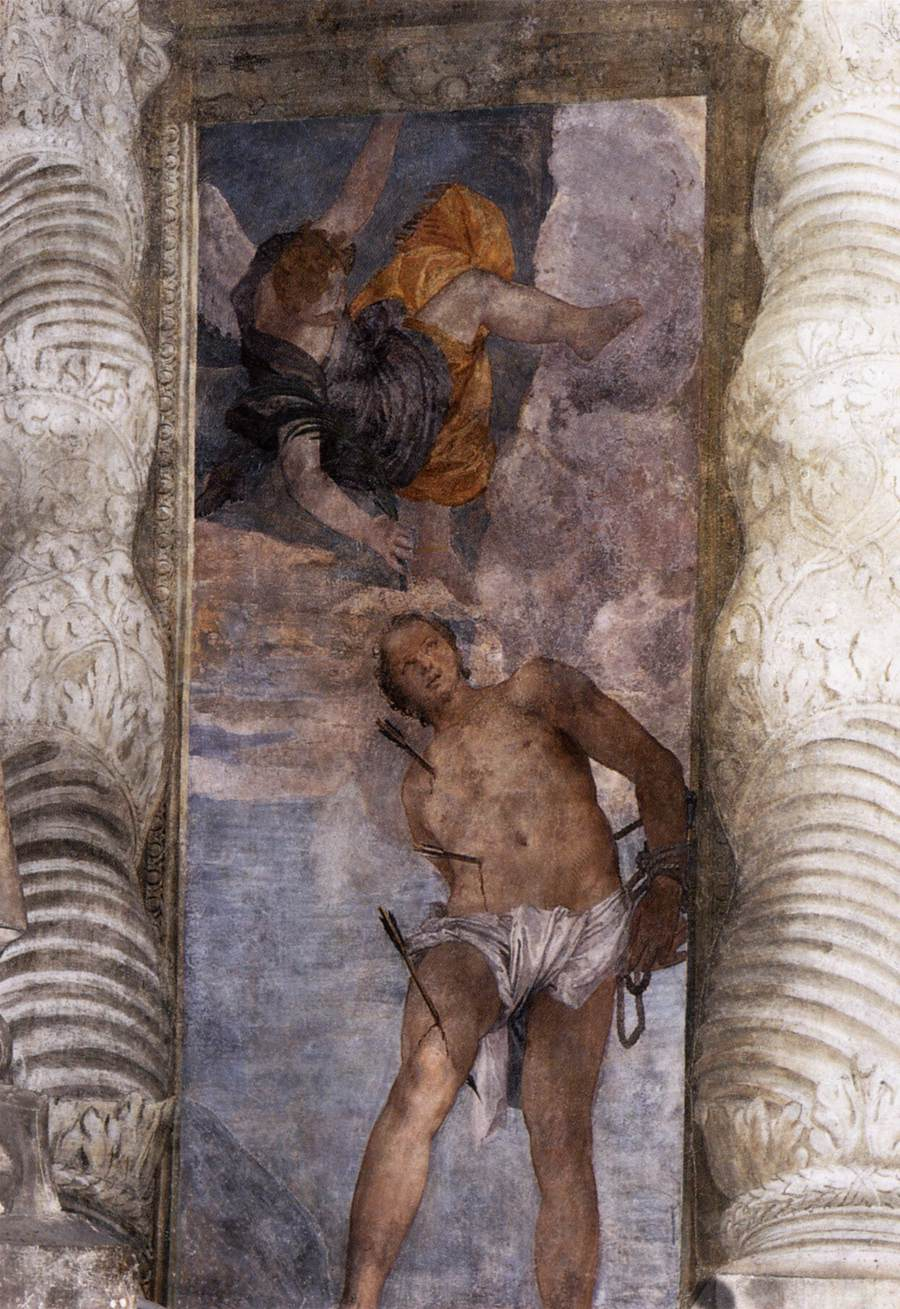
St Sebastian Martyr

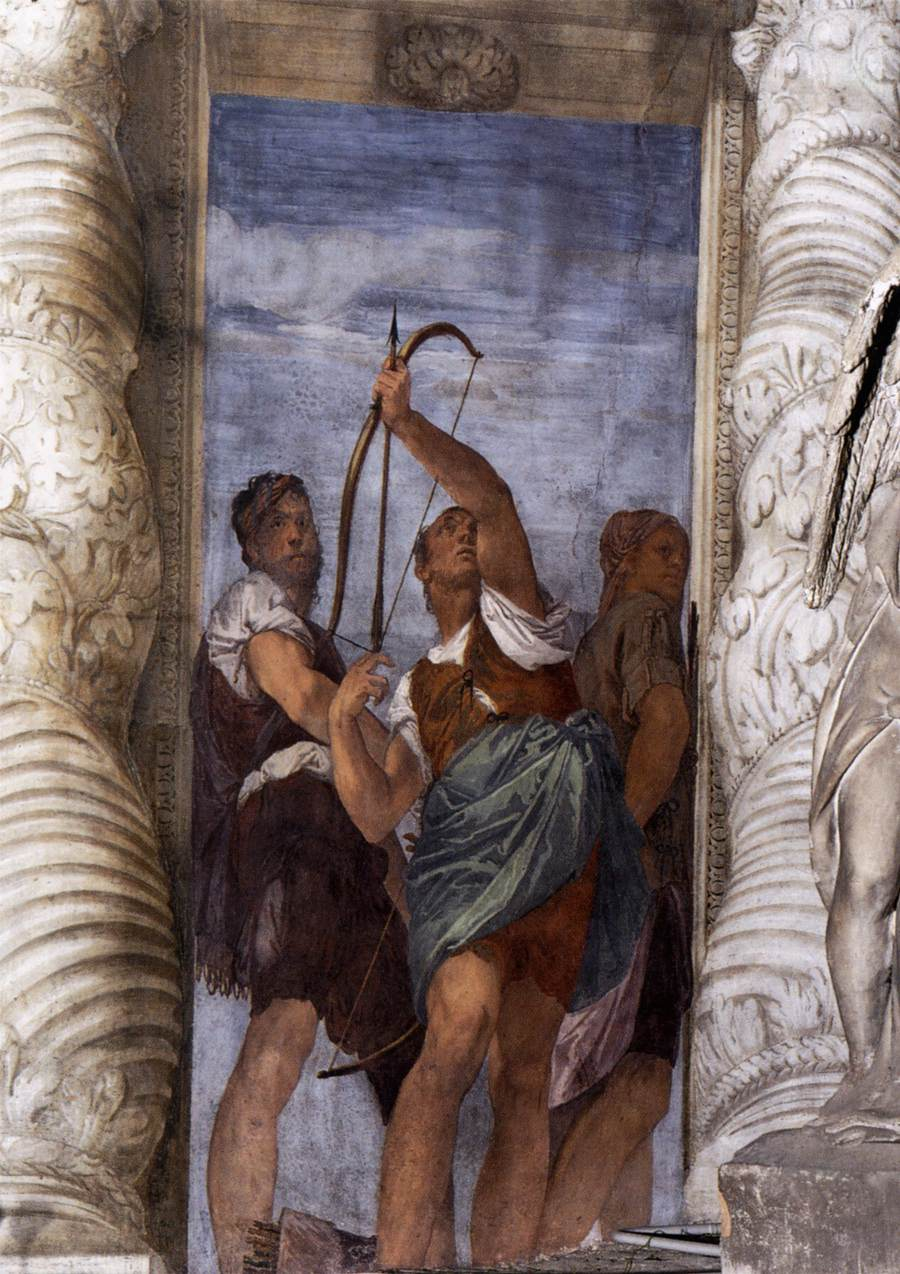
Archers for St Sebastian

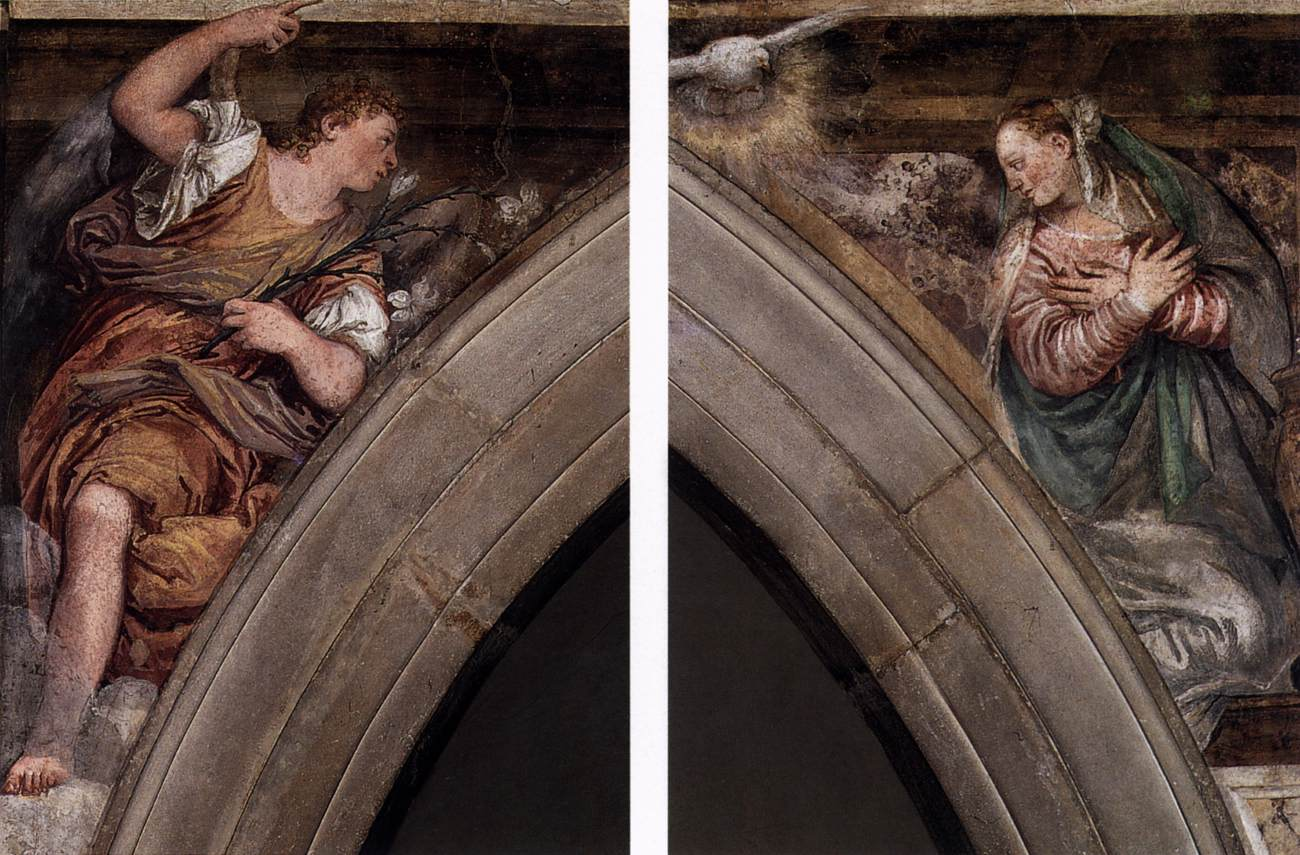
Annunciation (1558)

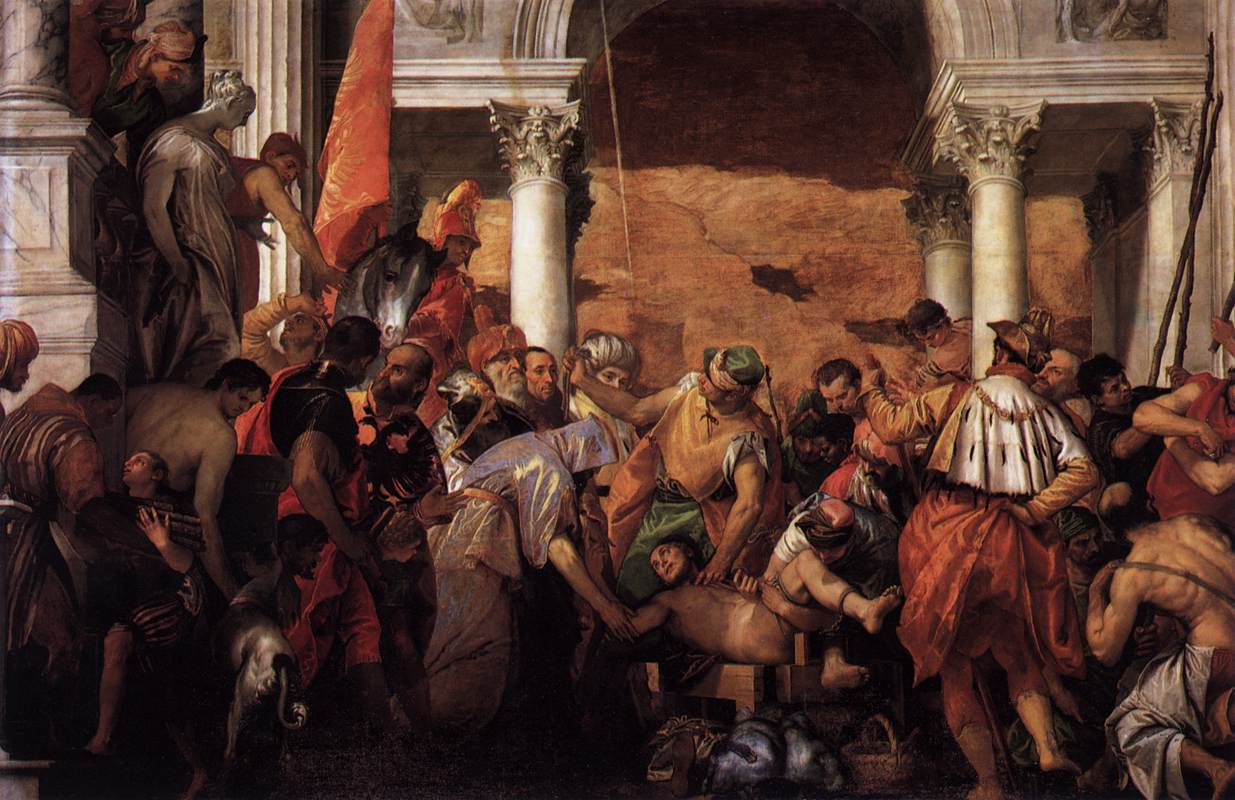
Martyrdom of St Lawrence (c. 1565)

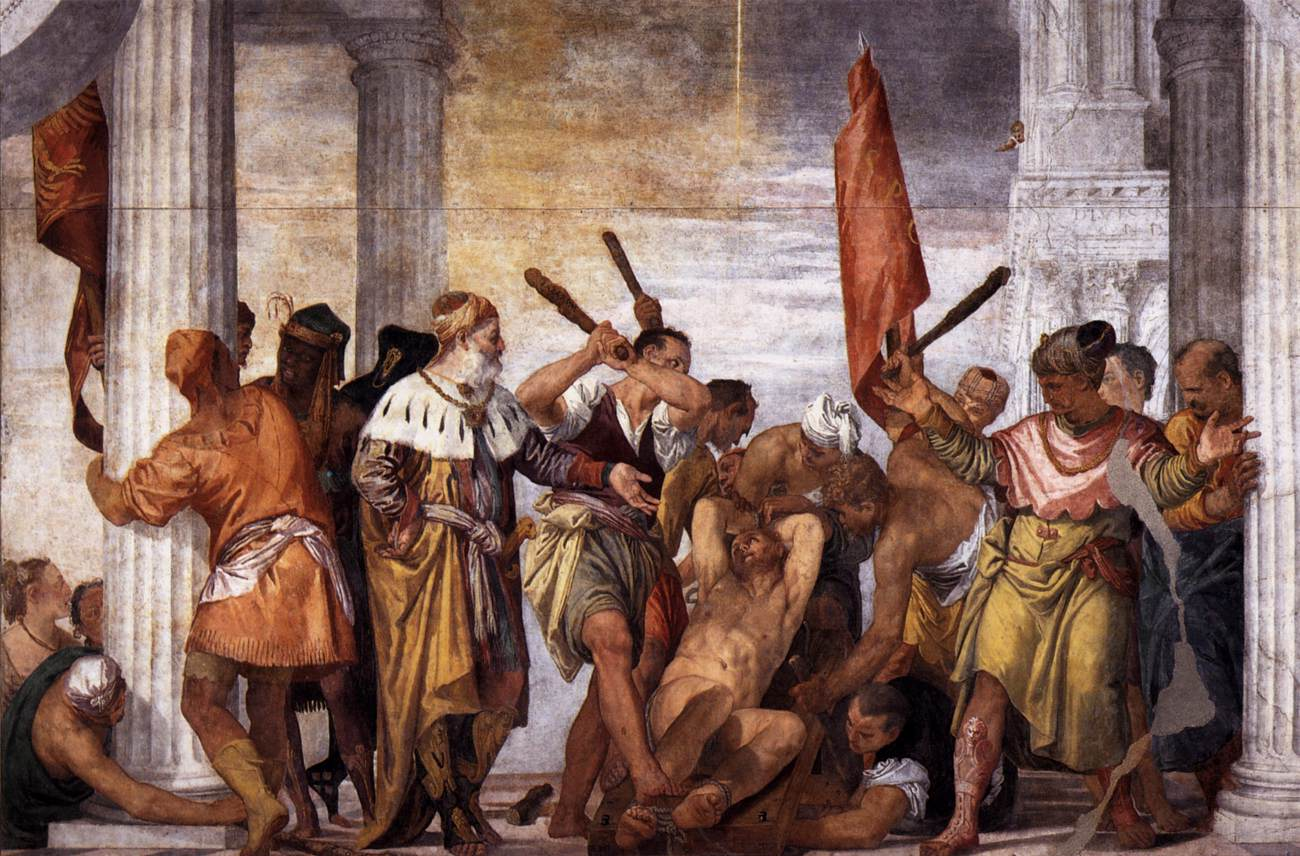
Martyrdom of St Sebastian (1558)

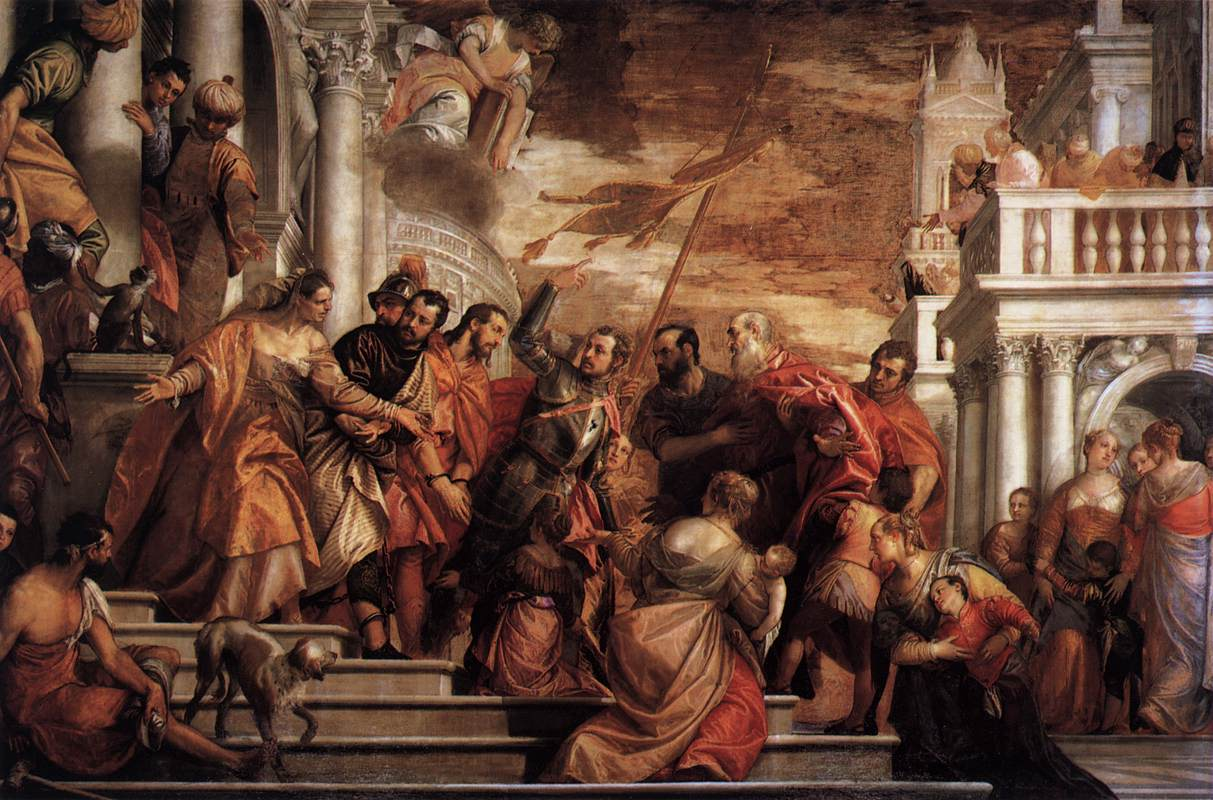
Martyrdom of Sts Mark & Marcellinus (c. 1565)

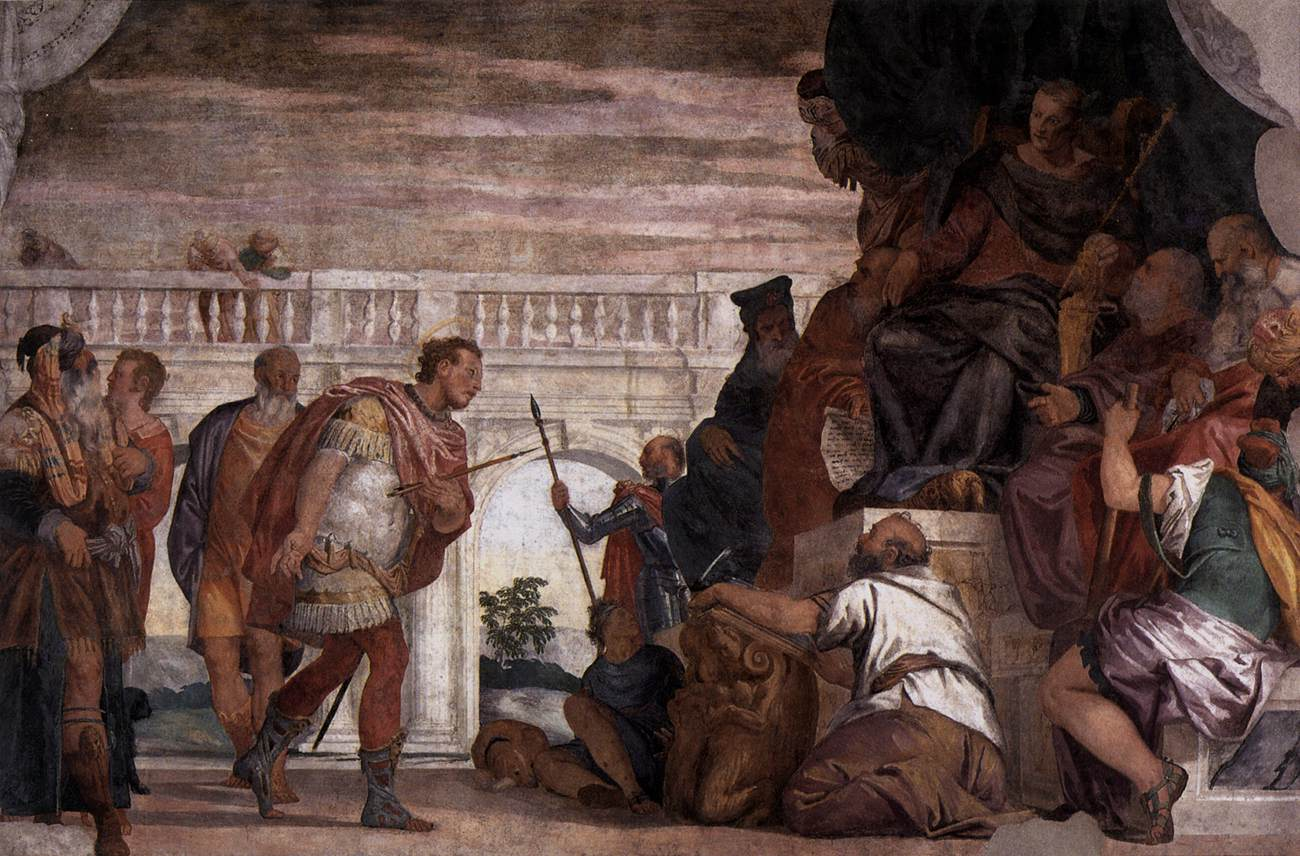
St Sebastian reproving Diocletian (1558)

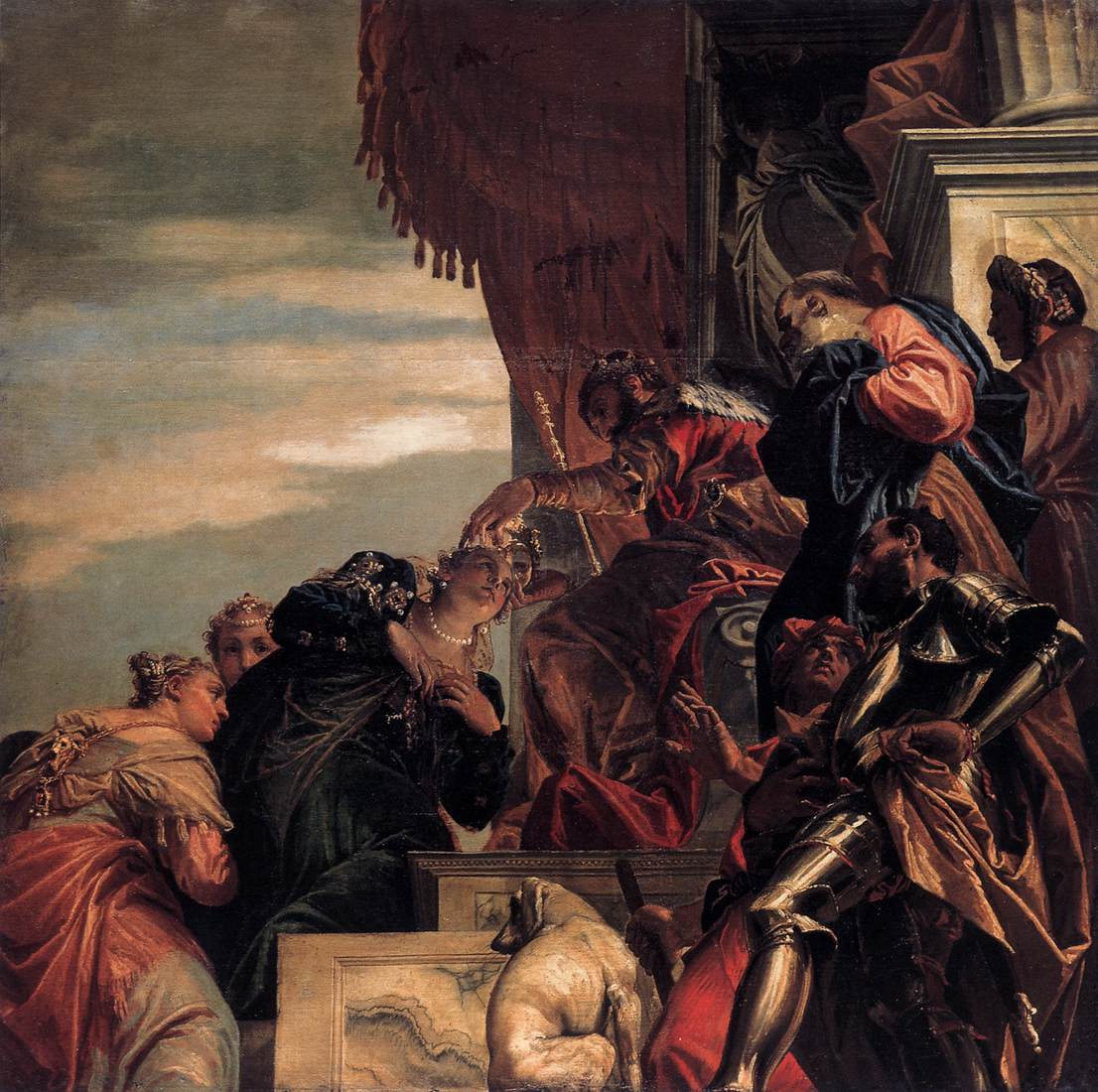
Esther Crowned by Ahasuerus

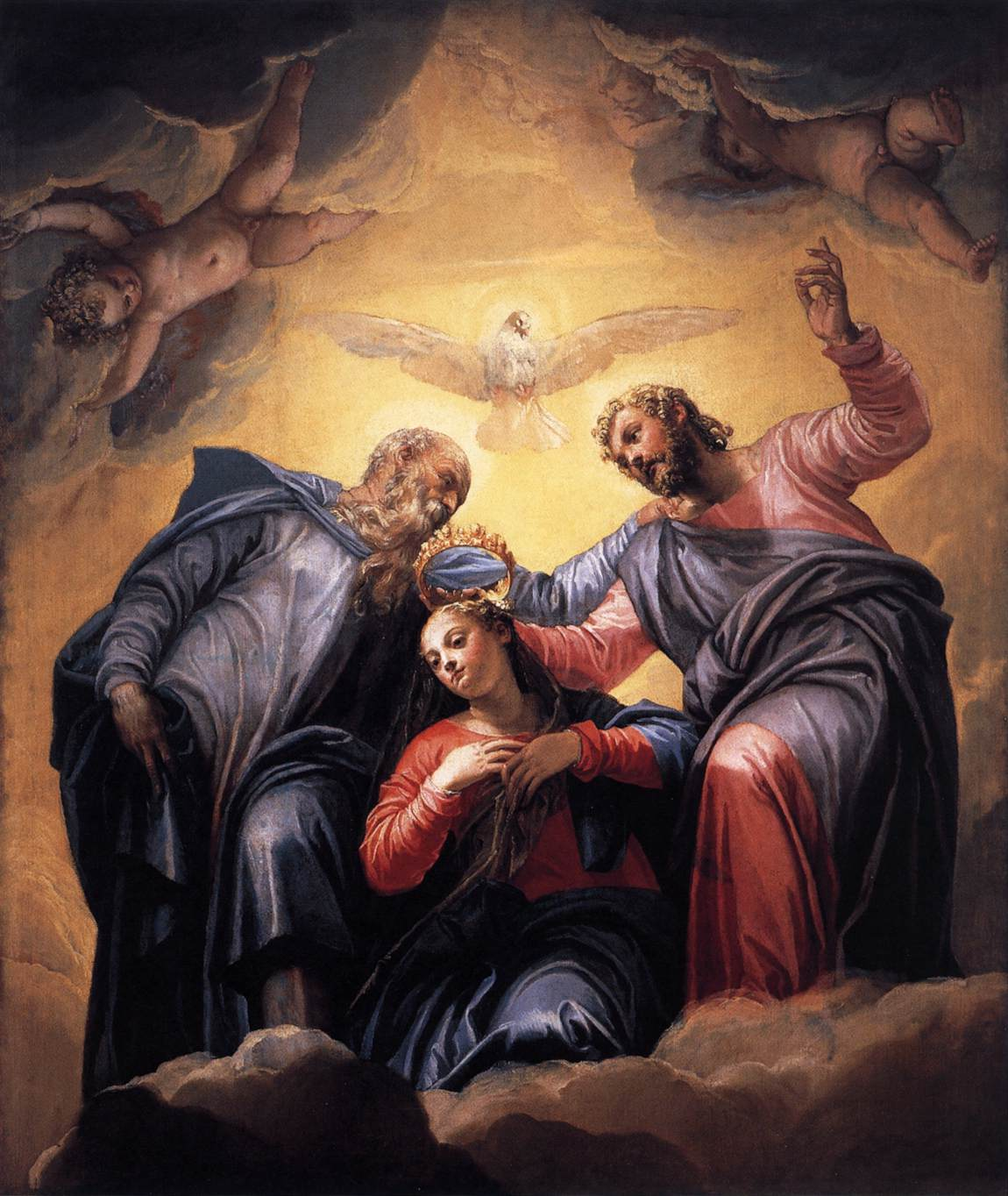
Coronation of Virgin

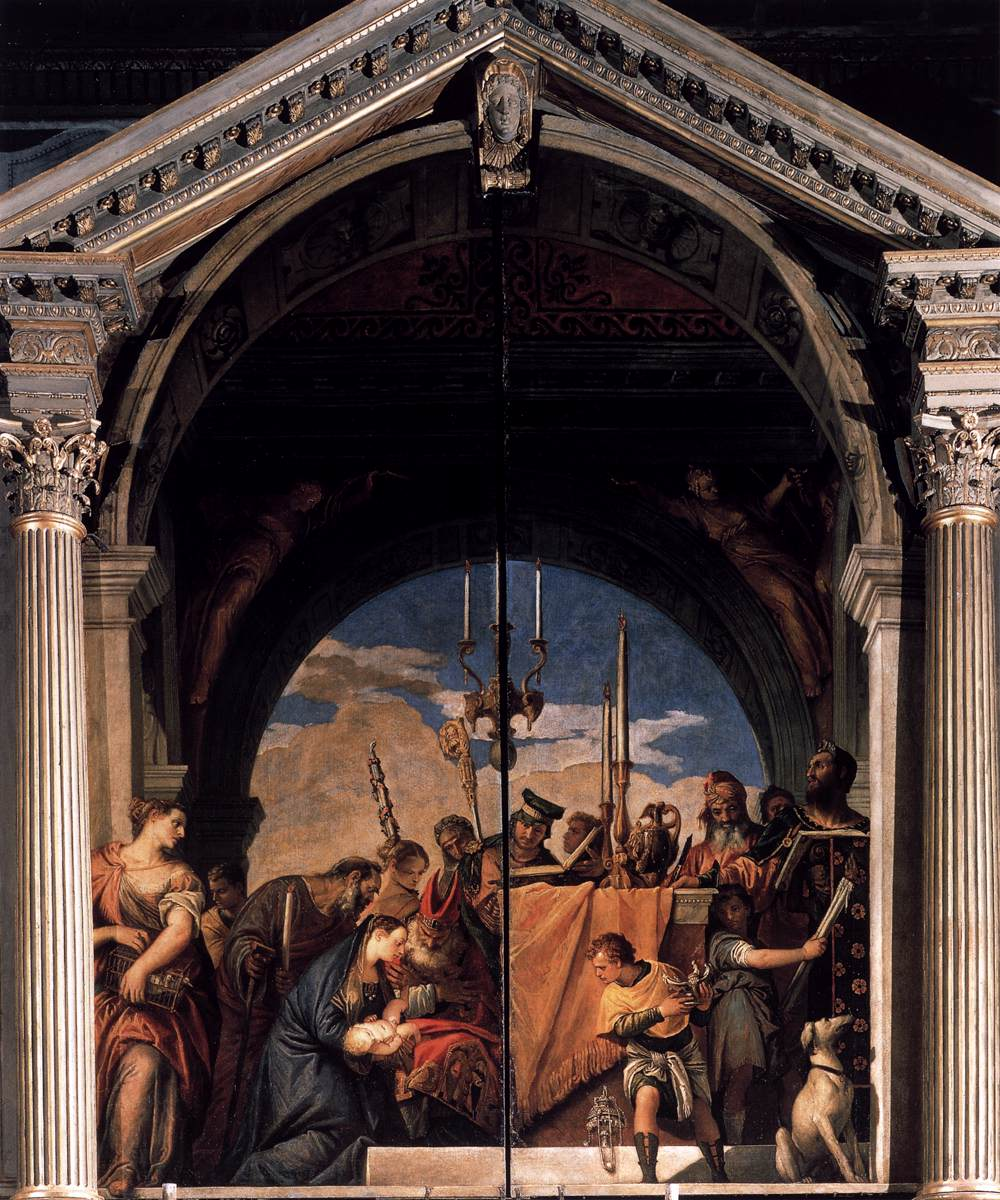
Presentation in the Temple (1560)

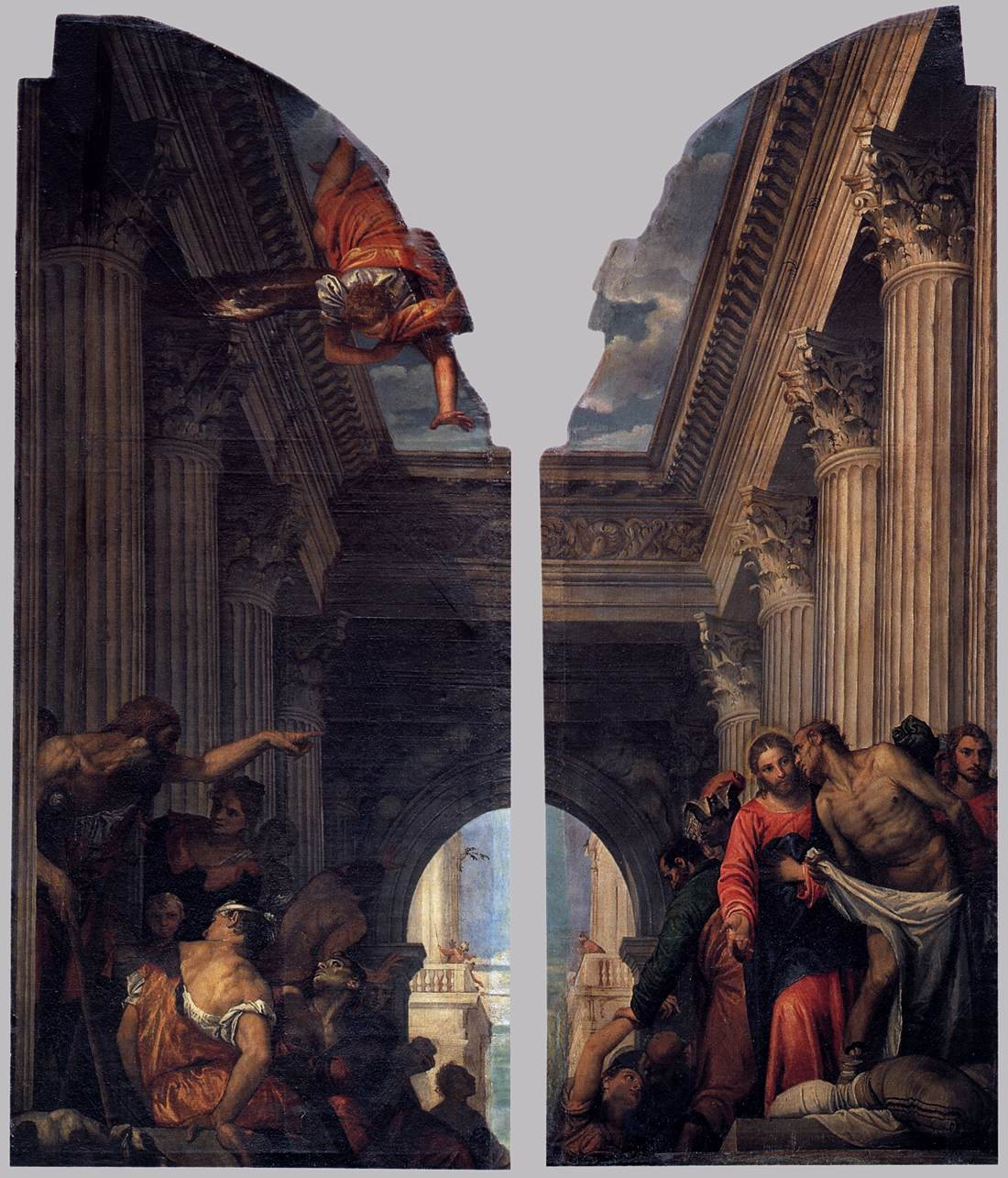
Miracle at Pool of Bethesda (organ panels)

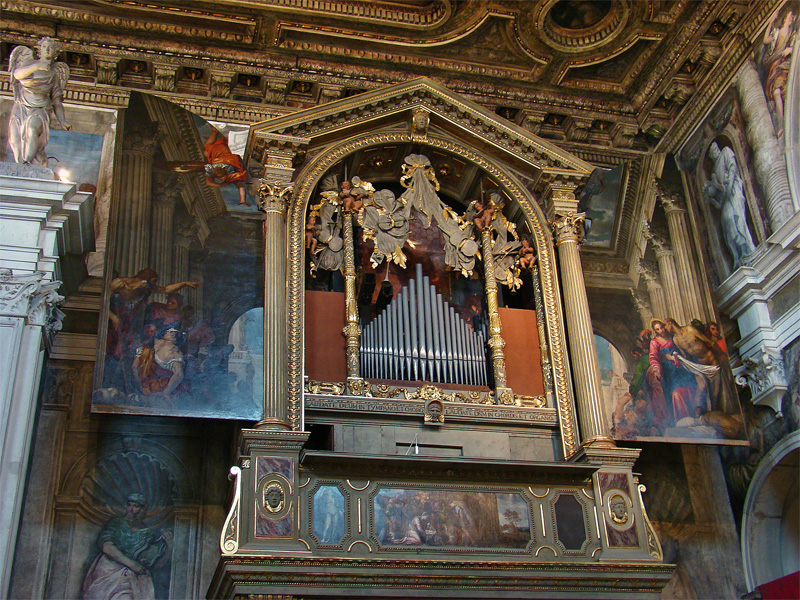
Organ with panels

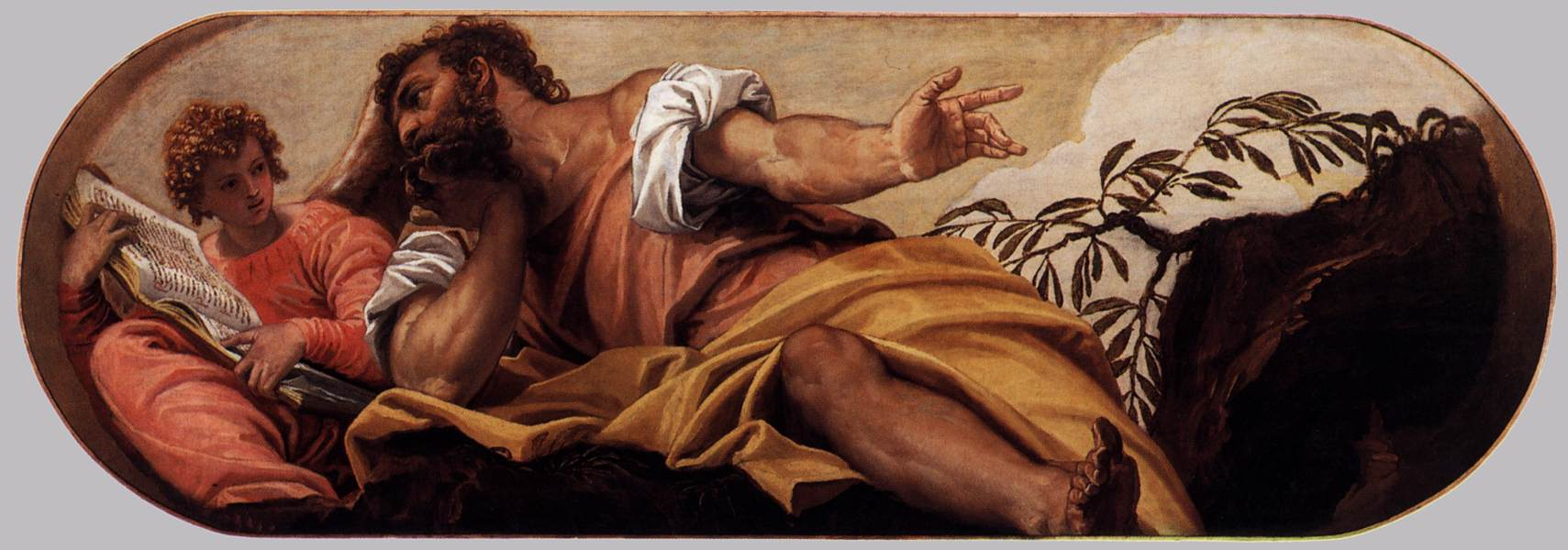
St Matthew

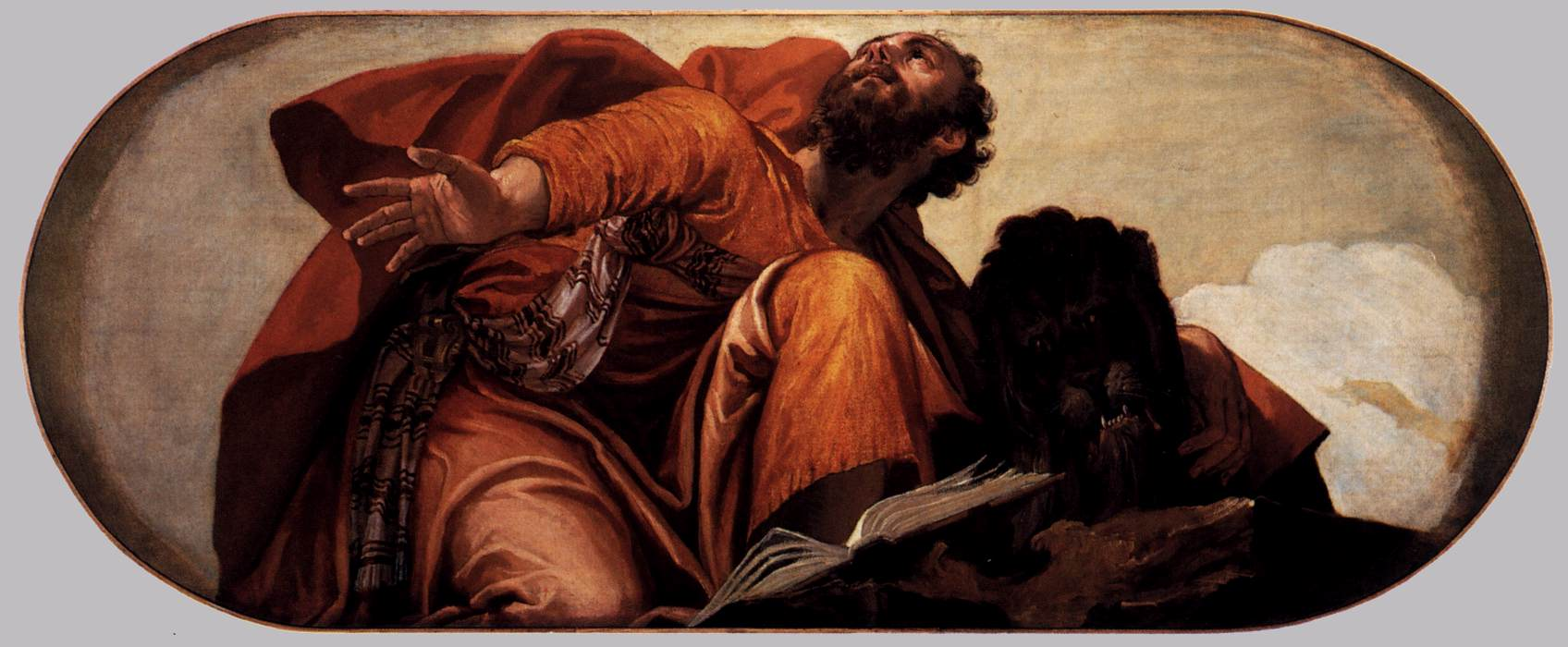
St Mark

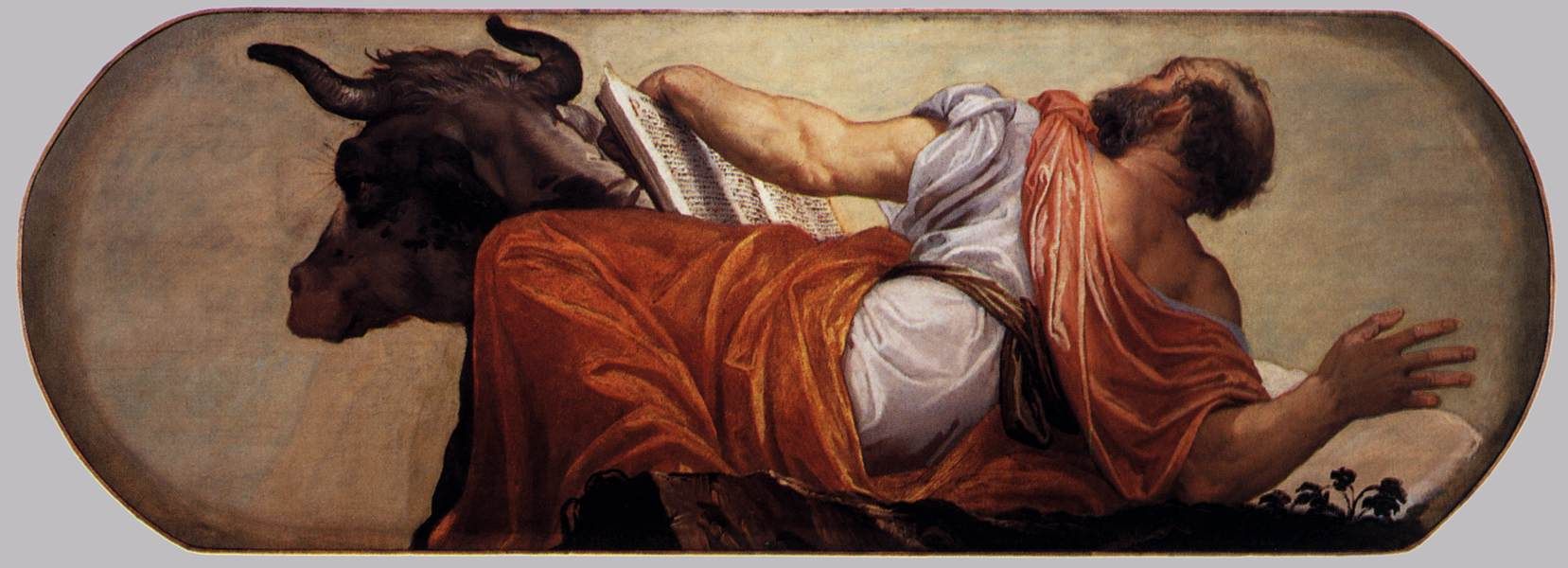
St Luke

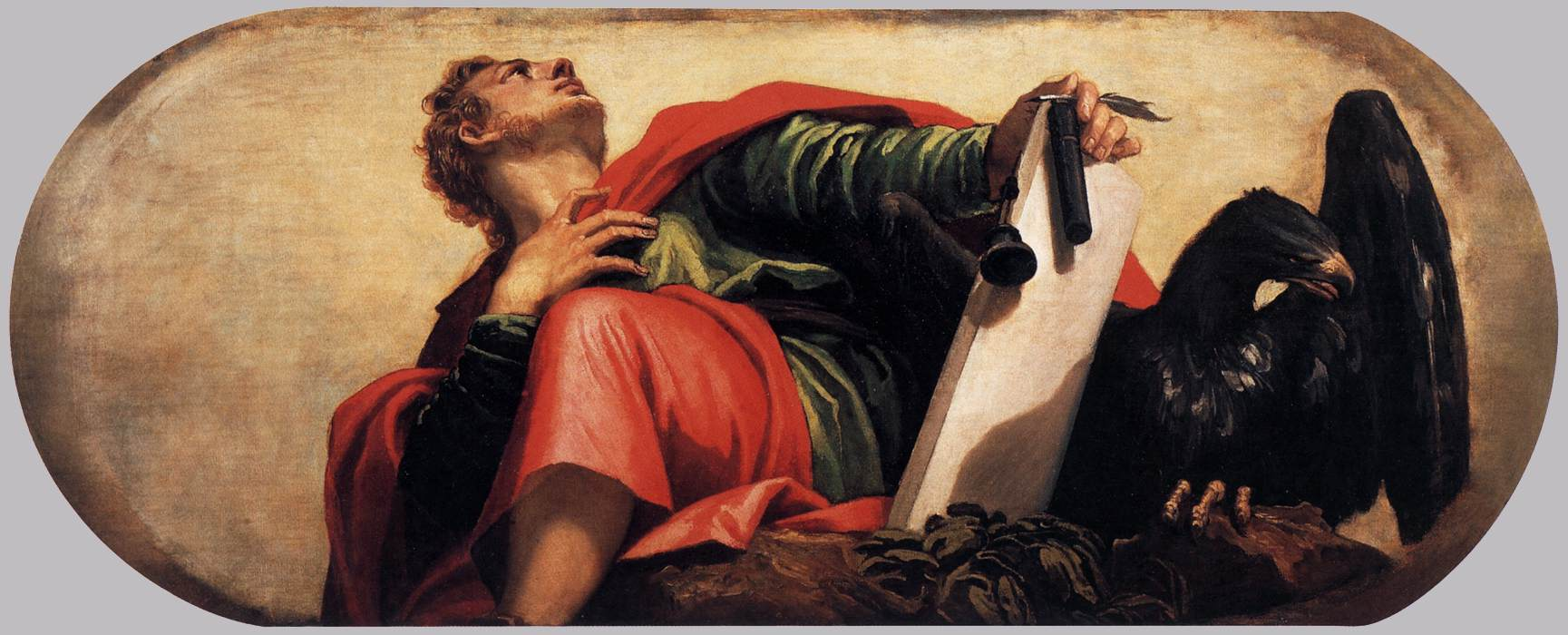
St John

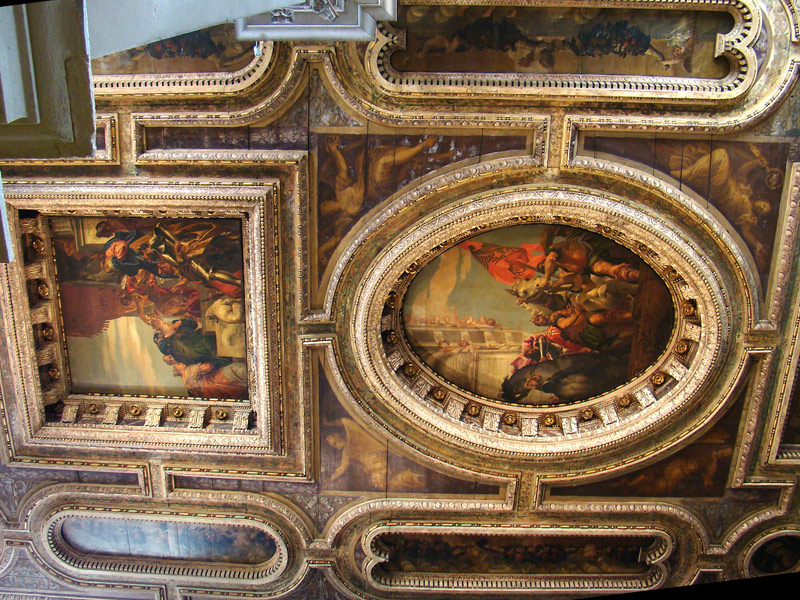
Coffered Ceiling with Veronese canvases
