= Medieval Royal Palace (Buda Castle) =

Buda Castle in the Middle Ages, from the Chronicles of Hartmann Schedel. The medieval palace wing which now belongs to the Budapest History Museum is indicated with a blue square. Next to it the Palace Chapel, dedicated to St. John the Almoner.

The Medieval Royal Palace of Buda Castle is a series of rooms from the old palace of the Hungarian kings, destroyed after 1686. Some rooms were unearthed and reconstructed during the postwar rebuilding of Buda Castle in 1958–62. The palace is now part of the permanent exhibition of the Budapest History Museum in "Building E" of Buda Castle.

== Historical background ==
The oldest part of the present-day palace was built in the 14th century by Prince Stephen, Duke of Slavonia, the younger brother of King Louis I of Hungary. The Gothic palace of King Louis I was arranged around a narrow courtyard next to Stephen's Tower (Budapest).

King Sigismund Luxemburg of Hungary greatly enlarged the palace. During his long reign it became probably the largest Gothic palace of the late Middle Ages. Buda was also an important artistic centre of the International Gothic style.

The last phase of grand-scale building activity happened under King Matthias Corvinus when Italian artists and craftsmen arrived at Buda. The Hungarian capital became the first centre of Renaissance north of the Alps.

On 29 August 1541 Buda was occupied by the Ottomans without any resistance. It became part of Ottoman Empire as the seat of the Eyalet of Budin.

The Ottoman government left the palace decaying. It was partially used as barracks, storage place and stables, otherwise it stood empty.

The medieval palace was destroyed in the great siege of 1686 when Buda was captured by the allied Christian forces. In the heavy artillery bombardment many buildings collapsed and burned out.

In 1715 King Charles III ordered the demolition of the ruins. Luckily the southern fortifications, zwingers and rooms were only buried under tons of rubbish and earth.

After the Baroque and turn of the 20th century Royal Palace of the Habsburgs was damaged in World War II archeological research was begun to unearth the remains of the medieval castle. It came out that important parts of the former Sigismund and Matthias palace survived under the thick level of earth fill.

The medieval rooms were reconstructed after 1952 according to the plans of László Gerő and they were converted into museum space. The most important archeological finds from the palace are displayed in the Budapest History Museum.

== Architectural context ==
Only a fragment of the medieval palace survived the destruction of 1686-1715 and the surviving rooms were not the most important ones of the original building. On the contrary, none of the more famous rooms and buildings, which were mentioned in the medieval sources, exist today. The rooms which were unearthed after 1946 were only saved by the chances of destruction and their geographical position, situated on a lower level then the newly created Baroque terrace. Both the Gothic Hall and the Palace Chapel were built by King Sigismund Luxemburg in the beginning of the 15th century. The Stephen's Castle is the oldest part of the palace from the 14th century.

The palace wing is surrounded with a complex system of medieval fortifications.

== The palace wing ==
Architect László Gerő in 1958–1962 partially recreated the façades of the Gothic castle facing the narrow southern, western and eastern courts. Only the ground and first floors were reconstructed although the castle was originally much higher. The unfinished state of the façade is indicated by the fact that roof is flat – the castle is simply cut in the line of the Baroque terrace above it. There are two windows opening towards the southern and another two openings towards the eastern court. The four windows are almost identical and all belong to the Gothic Hall behind them. They are square, four-panel stone windows of very fine Gothic craftmanship. Their outer frame is decorated with small columns. One window which had been walled up was discovered in situ during the archeological research, and the others were reconstructed from fragments by sculptor Ernő Szakál by means of anastylosis. The ground floor openings are more simple. An arched stone doorway gives access to the southern court from the cellar under the Gothic Hall.

The façade was originally plastered. The whitewashed surface was decorated with a painted pattern in rusty hue, resembling to rustication. Painted geometrical decoration was common feature on the medieval buildings of Buda. Fragments of the decoration were discovered on the eastern façade but it wasn't restored.

There is a Gothic balcony tower projecting from the wall at the end of the eastern façade. It is the only second floor part of the medieval palace which was recreated in 1958–62. Its reconstruction was a much debated issue because the balcony tower goes above the level of the Baroque terrace, disturbing the harmonious panorama of the palace. On the other hand, it clearly indicates the existence of the missing higher floors.

The balcony tower is a two-storey high structure that stands on a wide stone basement. The first floor is made up of a solid stone wall without any openings. The niche behind it belongs to the Gothic Hall. The second floor is a closed balcony with three windows. Originally it must have been part of an important ceremonial room. Now there is no room behind the façade, which was closed off with a glass wall from behind. The ground plan of the balcony shows the half of an octagon. The three Gothic double lancet windows are the most important architectural elements of the tower. The profiles, frames and mullions were restored in a simplified form but many original stones were also built in. The tower is covered with a flat metal roof.

The building of the Gothic Hall is connected to the Stephen's Castle (István vár) on the western side. It is the oldest part of the medieval royal palace which was built in the 1340s-1370s. It was named after Prince Stephen, Duke of Slavonia, the younger brother of King Louis I of Hungary. Only the foundation of the so-called Stephen's Tower and three interconnected, barrel-vaulted rooms survived from the original castle.

The Stephen's Tower (István torony) was the keep of Stephen's Castle. It was a huge building which was shown in every old picture of Buda Castle with its typical turreted spire. It was destroyed by an explosion in 1686. Only the ground floor walls were discovered after 1946. It was a square building (11,7 x 11,1 m), built upon the natural rock surface of Castle Hill. The walls are 2,31-2,7 m thick. There are narrow loopholes on the southern, western and northern sides. The original doorway on the eastern side was walled up after the Gothic Hall was built in the 15th century.

The siting of the tower was different from the later buildings and the triangle in front of it was walled up to create a continuous southern façade for the palace. During the post-war reconstruction this part of the façade (with a broken stone doorway) was not reconstructed to make it obvious that the Stephen's Tower was originally a free-standing structure. On the ground floor of the tower there was a vaulted room (6,2 x 6,3 m) which was still intact in 1820 according to a contemporary drawing. Although the ribs, corbels and the key stone was discovered during the archeological research, this room wasn't reconstructed. A spiral stairway had connected the room with the missing higher floors.

The remaining part of the Stephen's Castle (with the barrel-vaulted rooms behind) has a simple stone façade with a Gothic doorway. The pointed arch was restored.

== Interiors ==
=== Gothic Hall ===
The Gothic Hall is one of the most important surviving example of secular Gothic architecture in Central Europe. It was built by King Sigismund Luxemburg of Hungary in the early 15th century as an extension of the earlier Anjou palace. It was built on the southern edge of the natural rock plateau of Castle Hill. The level difference between the plateau and the southern court was about 2.79 m. A vaulted cellar was built under the hall to span this difference.

The Gothic Hall is an irregular rectangle of 20.2 x 11.55 m with a closed niche on the eastern side (the inside of the balcony tower mentioned above). It is divided into two naves which are covered with Gothic rib vaults. The vaults are supported by two massive pillars which come up uninterruptedly from the cellar beneath the room through the floor. There are half-pillars in the corners supporting the ribs. The very low pillars are creating a distinct space effect. All six vaults are fourpartite, and the two on the inner side are irregularly shaped.

The hall has four windows, two on the southern and two on the eastern side. There are stone benches in the window niches. The Hall is connected to the palace through a new door in the northern wall, supposedly on the place of the original doorway. The northern section of the floor is on a bit higher level (three steps higher).

All the newly built side walls are plastered and painted white while the original stone surfaces were left uncovered. The ribs, pillars, arches and window niches were restored by sculptor Ernő Szakál in 1961–62. These pieces supposedly belonged to another stately hall situated above the room but they were built into the reconstructed vaults by 20th-century restorers.

It is an interesting fact that the northern pillar of the Gothic Hall was already discovered by Alajos Hauszmann in the beginning of the 20th century. That time the remains were buried under the outbuildings of the Royal Gardens but Hauszmann protected the medieval pillar by means of building a brick shaft around it.

=== Barrel-vaulted rooms ===
The three interconnected, barrel-vaulted rooms belong to the oldest part of the palace, the Stephen's Castle which was built by Prince Stephen, Duke of Slavonia in the 14th century. The northern room is larger (6.62 × 9.42 m) than the southern ones (5 x 4.55 m). Another important difference is that the northern room is covered with an east–west axial vault while the southern rooms have north–south axial vaults.

The southern room is connected to the inner courtyard with a doorway. There is a small window high above the western wall. The middle room has a similar window while the larger northern room has three slit windows, one towards the western side and two northwards (proving the existence of a northern courtyard). All the windows had iron rails. The rooms are connected to each other with carved Gothic corbel doors. The walls were originally plastered.

An interesting feature of the southern room is the medieval stairway which led to a trapdoor and a medieval toilet above which were hidden in the empty space between the walls of the castle and the keep.

The barrel-vaulted rooms were supposedly used as a prison in the Middle Ages. Later the southern vaults collapsed. The intact barrel vault of the northern room was broken by Alajos Hauszmann in the beginning of the 20th century when he filled the cellar with rubble. The barrel-vaulted rooms were restored in 1958–1962.

=== Albrecht Cellar ===
There is a huge medieval cellar north of the barrel-vaulted rooms which was later called Albrecht Cellar (Albrecht pince). It is covered with a huge Gothic brick barrel vault and its walls are blackened from burning. The cellar was probably built by King Sigismund of Luxemburg as the Cisterna Regia i.e. the great underground cistern of the palace.

The Cisterna Regia was situated under the former northern zwinger (courtyard) of the palace. This small rectangular courtyard became a private royal garden during the reign of King Matthias Corvinus. The private garden was an early Renaissance giardino segreto or "hidden garden". It was designed by architect Chimenti Camicia in the 1470s. There was a well in the middle of the garden which was fed by the cistern underneath.

The hidden garden, the well and the cistern survived the 1686 siege of Buda. They were indicated on the plans of the area drawn by military architect Joseph de Haüy in 1687. In 1715-1724 the former Cisterna Regia became the cellar of the new Baroque palace. A section of this room was later used as ice-chamber.

=== King's Cellar ===
The King's Cellar (Király pince) is not a medieval structure but a huge Baroque-era brick cellar under the Danube side of "Building E". It was filled with tons of earth and rubble but the original eastern façade of the medieval royal palace survived under the fill. The inner walls of the Baroque palace were actually built upon the old façade. Only the 7 m high basement section of the original façade remained.

This wing was built by King Sigismund of Luxenburg in the early 15th century but it was rebuilt by King Matthias Corvinus 50 years later. The surviving eastern façade was built from large, finely carved blocks of stone. It followed the contour of Castle Hill with a break in the middle. A huge buttress was added and a rectangular tower with two buttresses on its corners. It was possible to reconstruct the lower part of a balcony on the tower with three elegant Gothic corbels decorated with cusps.

It was not possible to demolish the King's Cellar because of structural reasons (the whole Baroque palace was resting upon it) but the inner fill was removed in 1961. The medieval façade was reconstructed inside the cellar space between 1961 and 1965. Now the architectural history of the palace is readable from the interwoven layers of the past. The outer wall of the cellar was broken through with large windows to let in the daylight.

On 25 July 2007 Prime Minister Ferenc Gyurcsány chose the King's Cellar as the place to announce the list of the "most important public works projects", financed by European Union funds between 2007 and 2013.

== See also ==
- Palace Chapel (Buda Castle)
- Interiors of Buda Castle
- Works of art in Buda Castle
