= Palace Chapel (Buda Castle) =

Chapel, Budapest, Hungary

Coordinates: 47.49570°N 19.04076°E

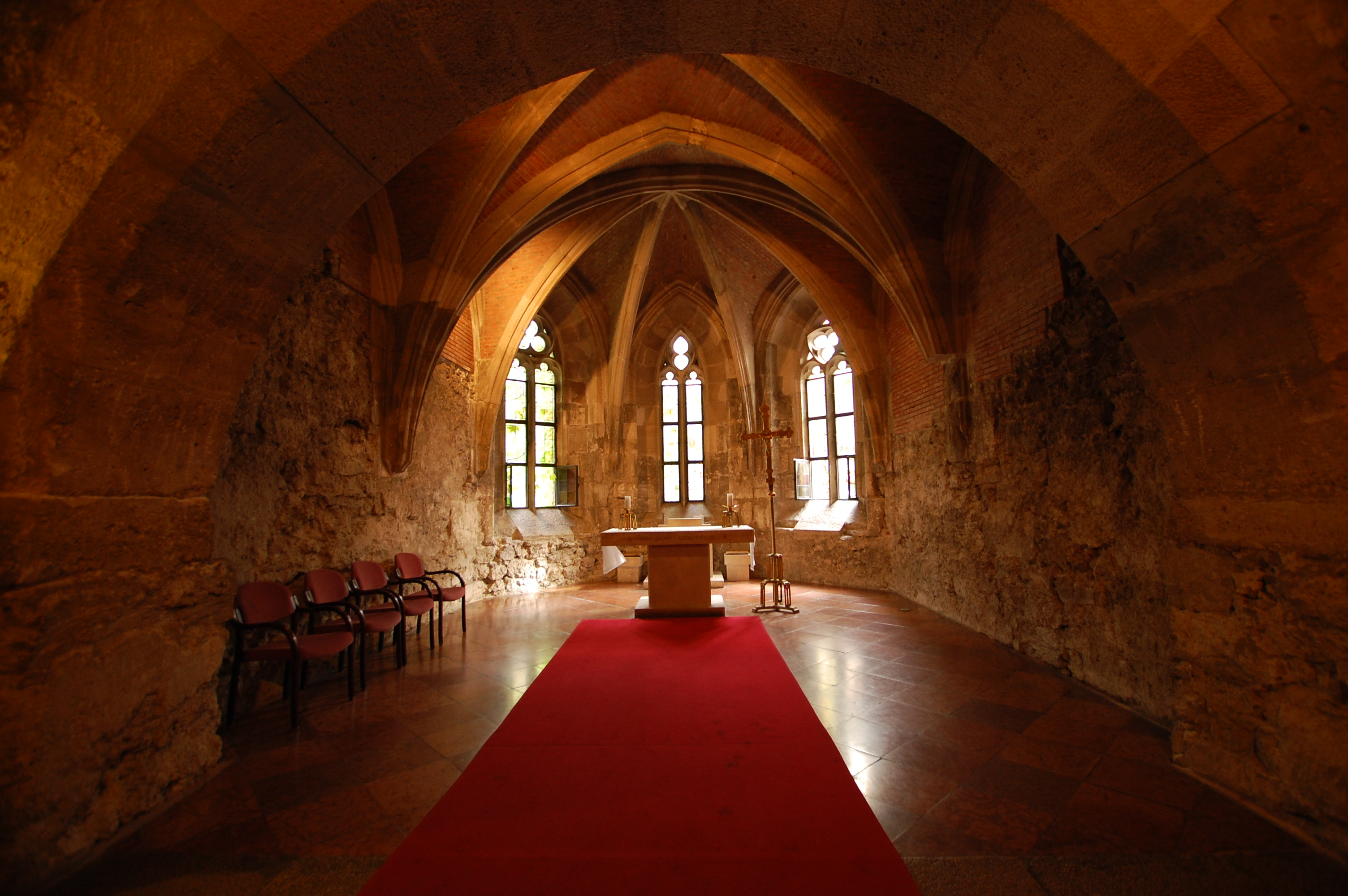
Medieval Palace Chapel

The medieval Palace Chapel (Hungarian: Várkápolna; formerly Alamizsnás Szent János-kápolna) in Buda Castle was built in the 15th century by King Sigismund as the lower chapel of the former Castle Church. The Gothic chapel, which survived the destruction of the 1686 siege, was buried under a Baroque terrace for centuries. After its reconstruction in 1963 became part of the exhibition of the Budapest History Museum.

== History ==
The first chapel in Buda Castle was probably built in the 14th century during the reign of Louis I of Hungary. The chapel was mentioned in the Chronicle of Eberhard Windecke. Windecke claimed that Charles II of Hungary was attacked by his murderers in 1386 in a room from which the royal chapel could be seen: "konig Karle von Nopols erslagen zü Ofen in der vesten in der stuben, do man sicht in die capell." The chapel was also mentioned in the Chronicle of Lorenzo de Monacis, written around 1390.

King Sigismund thoroughly rebuilt the old Anjou palace during the first decades of the 15th century. He erected a splendid Gothic church in place of the former chapel. Its façade was facing towards the inner palace courtyard, and the long chancel was projecting from the eastern side of the palace. The chancel was built upon a lower church, a solution which was necessitated by the lack of space on the narrow plateau. It had a 21 m (69 ft)-long nave and an 11 m (36 ft)-long chancel. Two-storeyed royal chapels were not uncommon in medieval Europe. The flamboyant Royal Church of Buda Castle was similar to the more famous Sainte-Chapelle in Paris.

Buda Castle in the Middle Ages, from the Chronicles of Hartmann Schedel. The Palace Church, dedicated to St. John the Almoner, is indicated by the blue rectangle.

The archeological research proved the dating of the church, because 15th century strata were discovered under the intact brick floor of the lower church.

In November 1489 Sultan Bayezid II sent the relics of John the Almoner to King Matthias Corvinus. The King placed the relics in the Royal Chapel which was re-dedicated and embellished with Renaissance furniture.

In 1526 Buda was plundered by the Ottoman Turks after the Battle of Mohács. The relics were rescued in time and carried to Pressburg where they are still kept today. A surviving church inventory from 1530 still shows the wealth of furnishings. Later King John Zápolya converted the lower church into a bastion. The large Gothic windows were walled up, only the new, rectangular loopholes were left open.

In 1541 the Ottoman Turks captured Buda without fight and the Royal Church ceased to be a place of Christian worship. The upper church was destroyed in the 1686 siege of Buda and the ruins were demolished in 1715. The vault of the lower church fell down and the interior was filled with rubbish. The remains were buried under the new Baroque terrace for two centuries.

The ruins of the lower church were discovered by archeologists in 1949-50. The remains were buried in 1953 because of conceptional disputes about the possible reconstruction. The chapel was finally reconstructed by 1963. It was re-consecrated in 1990.

== See also ==
- History of Buda Castle
- Medieval Royal Palace (Buda Castle)
