= San Giovanni Elemosinario =

Church in Venice, Italy

Coordinates: 45°26′19.57″N 12°20′2.09″E

Church of San Giovanni Elemosinario
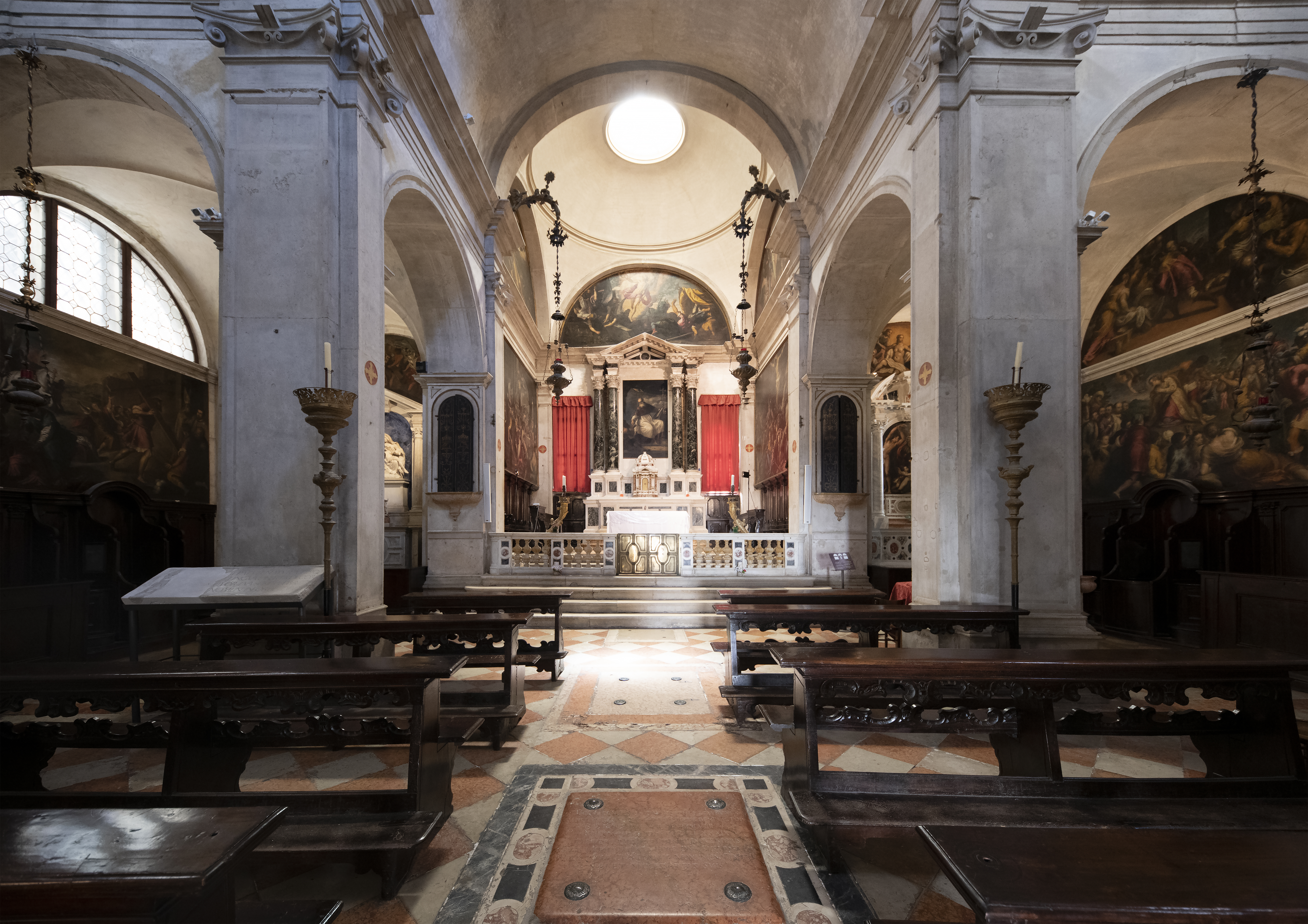
- Interior

- Location within Venice Location within Italy

Religion
- Affiliation: Roman Catholic
- Province: Venice

Location
- Location: Venice, Italy

Architecture
- Architect: Antonio Abbondi
- Type: Church
- Style: Renaissance
- Completed: 16th Century

San Giovanni Elemosinario is a church of Venice, northern Italy, dedicated to Saint John the Almsgiver.

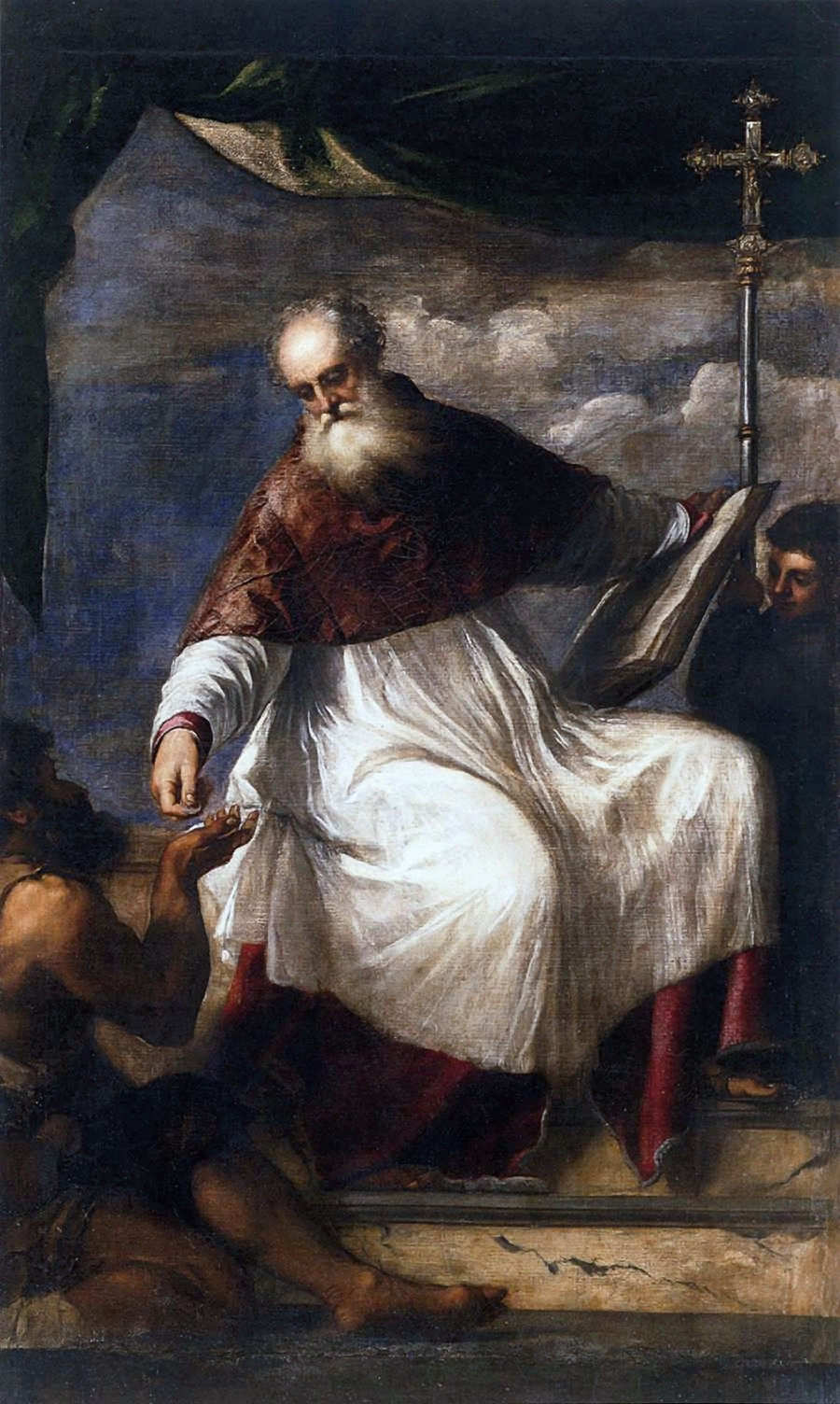
St. John the Almsgiver, by Titian.

This church was founded in 1071, and was completely destroyed by the disastrous Rialto fire in 1514. The church was rebuilt by Antonio Abbondi called Scarpagnino. The painter Antonio Vassilacchi worked here in the 16th century. Nestled into the dense area near the Rialto Market (with your back to the Bridge on the San Polo side, turn left just past the flea market booths; the entrance will be through the frescoed arch behind iron gates on your left).

The altarpiece on the high altar depicts St. John the Almsgiver (1545-1550) by Titian; the right apse chapel houses Saints Catherine, Sebastian and Roch (c. 1533) by il Pordenone.

== See also ==
- 16th-century Western domes

== Sources ==
- Brusegan, Marcello (2008). Le chiese di Venezia. Newton Compton.
- Vasari, Giorgio (1568) [1550]. Vite de' più eccellenti architetti, pittori, et scultori italiani, da Cimabue insino a' tempi nostri.
- Fiocco, G. (1939). Giovanni Antonio Pordenone. Udine.
- Die Kirchen Venedigs - ein Museum in der Stadt. Venice: Marsilio. 2002.
- DuMont visuell Reiseführer Venedig. Cologne: DuMont. 1993.
