= Patriarch Theodore I of Alexandria =

7th-century Greek Patriarch of Alexandria

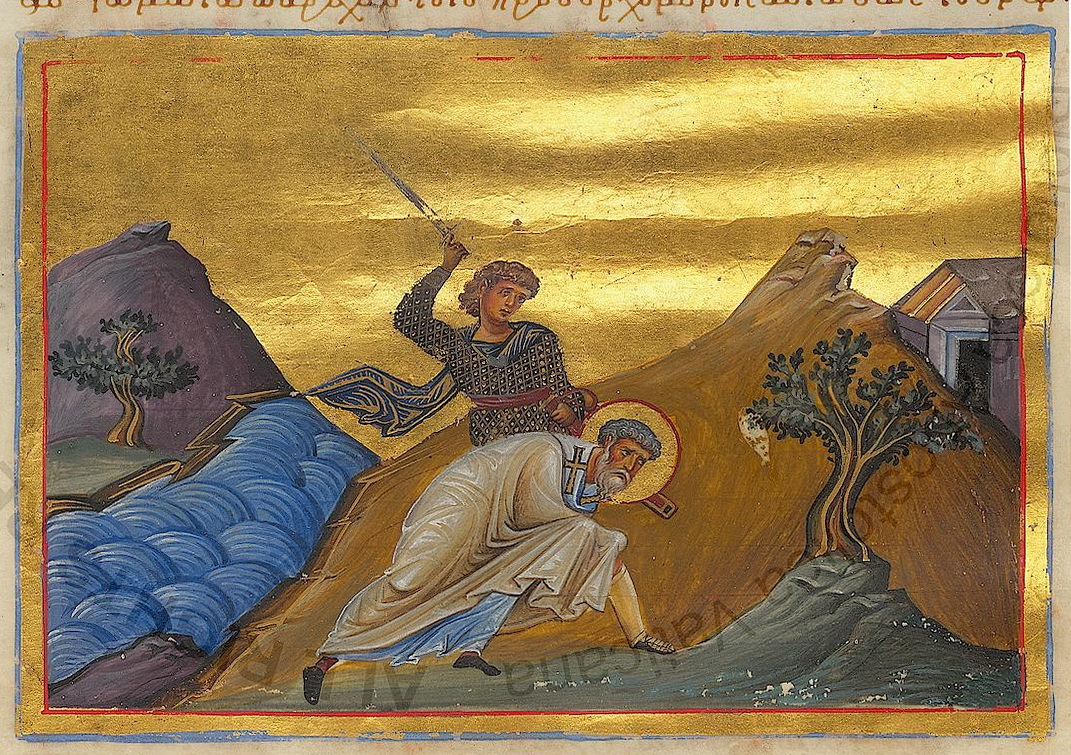

Theodore I, also known as Theodore Scribo, served as Greek Patriarch of Alexandria between 607 and 609. Having been appointed by Phocas, he opposed the Heraclian revolt and was killed in the conflict.

Preceded by Eulogius I	Greek Patriarch of Alexandria; 607–609	Succeeded by John V
