= The Castle of Buda (online database) =

Buda Castle website and database

- Available in: English, Hungarian
- Website: budavar.btk.mta.hu/en/
- Launched: 2013

The Castle of Buda is an online database and article collection about the history, monuments, streets, and squares of the Buda Castle Quarter. The website was started in 2013, and it is edited by the researchers of the Budapest History Museum and the Research Centre for the Humanities of the Hungarian Academy of Sciences.

The site, based on The Castle of Buda. Monuments of History and Architecture, uses the latest research to present the Buda Castle and its vicinity. Besides the texts on architectural and municipal history, the site contains a gallery with archive photos, paintings, drawings, and the detailed map of the Buda Castle Quarter with house numbers. The researcher choose the online publication because of the vitality of open access to knowledge.
