= List of consorts of Löwenstein-Wertheim =

This page contains all consorts of the Central European land of Löwenstein-Wertheim, in its various incarnations, from the establishment of the title until the modern day.

== Countess of Löwenstein (1494–1611) ==
Picture	Name	Father	Birth	Marriage	Became Countess	Ceased to be Countess	Death	Spouse
	Elisabeth of Montfort	Hugo XI, Graf von Montfort in Tettnang (Montfort)	1465	5 March 1488		13 January 1503		Louis I
	Sophia Böcklin	Wilhelm Böcklin	1460	1509		28 March 1523 husband's death	1536	Louis I
	Anna Schenk of Limpurg	Gottfried Schenk of Limpurg	1499	16 December 1525		1536	1536	Louis II
	Helene of Königsegg	Johann, Freiherr von Königsegg zu Aulendorf (Koenigsegg)	1509	16 June 1524	1536 husband's accession	3 February 1541 husband's death	20 April 1566	Frederick I
	Anna of Stolberg	Ludwig, Graf zu Stolberg-Königstein und Rochefort (Stolberg)	1531	1580		1580; Name changed in Löwenstein-Wertheim	1599	Louis III

== Countess of Löwenstein-Scharfeneck (1552?–1633) ==
Picture	Name	Father	Birth	Marriage	Became Countess	Ceased to be Countess	Death	Spouse
	Rosalie von Hewen	Georg, Freiherr von Höwen auf Hohentrins (Hewen)	1 January 1530	10 December 1551	1552	27 November 1571 husband's death	13 October 1581	Wolfgang I
	Catherine Anastasia of Waldeck	Wolrad II, Count of Waldeck-Eisenberg (Waldeck)	20 March 1566	18 October 1585		29 November 1596 husband's death	18 February 1635	Wolfgang II
	Elisabeth Juliane of Erbach	George III, Count of Erbach-Breuberg (Erbach)	13 January 1600	6 November 1621		3 January 1633 husband's death	27 May 1640	George Louis

== Countess of Löwenstein-Wertheim (1580-1665) ==
Picture	Name	Father	Birth	Marriage	Became Countess	Ceased to be Countess	Death	Spouse
	Anna of Stolberg	Ludwig, Graf zu Stolberg-Königstein und Rochefort (Stolberg)	1531	1580	1580; Name changed	1599		Louis III
	Gertrude of Schutzbar genannt Milchling	(Schutzbar genannt Milchling)		1605	13 March 1611 husband's accession			Louis IV
	Juliana of Wied	Wilhelm IV, Graf zu Wied (Wied)	c.1580	18 May 1634		24 August 1635 husband's death		Louis IV
	Barbara of Hohenlohe-Waldenburg	George Frederick I, Count of Hohenlohe-Waldenburg (Hohenlohe)	22 June 1592	9 March 1625	24 August 1635 husband's accession	26 May 1636 husband's death	March 1665	Wolfgang Ernest
The other two sons of Louis III, Christoph Ludwig and Johann Dietrich, formed the two branches of the family still existing

=== Countess of Löwenstein-Wertheim-Virneburg (1611–1812) ===
Picture	Name	Father	Birth	Marriage	Became Countess	Ceased to be Countess	Death	Spouse
	Countess Elisabeth of Manderscheid-Schleiden, Heiress of Virneburg	Joachim, Graf von Manderscheid in Neuerburg und Virneburg (Manderscheid)	27 July 1569	27 Apr 1592	1611; County divided	17 February 1618 husband's death	26 October 1621	Christopher Louis
	Countess Anna Hedwig of Stolberg-Ortenburg	Ludwig Georg, Count of Stolberg-Ortenburg (Stolberg)	1599	29 Sep 1622		1634		Frederick Louis
	Countess Agnes Maria von Tubingen	Eberhard, Count of Tübingen-Lichteneck (Tübingen)	1599	1636		5 July 1638		Frederick Louis
	Baroness Anna Sidonia of Teuffenbach		1623	1644		1657	1657	Frederick Louis
	Countess Katharina of Sayn-Wittgenstein-Homburg	Ernest of Sayn-Wittgenstein-Homborg (Sayn-Wittgenstein)	23 June 1639	16 June 1661		13 December 1671		Louis Ernest
	Countess Juliana Dorothea of Limpurg-Gaildorf	Wilhelm Heinrich von Limpurg Gaildorf	10 May 1677	1 May 1693		1 January 1698 husband's death	4 October 1734	Eucharius Kasimir
	Countess Amöne Sophie of Limpurg-Speckfeld	Vollrath, Reichserbschenk und Graf zu Limpurg in Speckfeld	24 August 1684	7 May 1703		31 March 1721 husband's death	20 February 1746	Heinrich Friedrich
	Countesse Friederike Charlotte of Erbach-Erbach	Friedrich Karl, Count of Erbach-Erbach (Erbach-Erbach)	July 1722	7 December 1738		29 December 1786		Johann Ludwig Vollrath
	Landgravine Dorothea Maria of Hesse-Philippsthal-Barchfeld	William, Landgrave of Hesse-Philippsthal-Barchfeld (Hesse-Philippsthal-Barchfeld)	30 December 1738	6 July 1764	4 February 1790 husband's accession	26 September 1799		Johann Karl Ludwig

=== Countess of Löwenstein-Wertheim-Rochefort (1611–1712) ===
Picture	Name	Father	Birth	Marriage	Became Countess	Ceased to be Countess	Death	Spouse
	Countess Josina de la Marck	Philipp von der Marck (House of La Marck)	3 January 1583	6 November 1610	1611; County divided	26 February 1626		Johann Dietrich
	Countess Anna Maria of Fürstenberg-Heiligenberg	Egon VIII of Fürstenberg-Heiligenberg (Fürstenberg)	12 September 1634	16 March 1651		27 January 1672 husband's death	1 January 1705	Ferdinand Karl
	Countess Maria Polyxena Khuen von Lichtenberg und Belasi	Mathias, Graf Khuen von Belasi (Khuen von Belasi)	14 July 1658	26 Aug 1678		1712 husband raised to Prince	12 November 1712	Maximilian Karl

== Princess of Löwenstein-Wertheim ==
=== Löwenstein-Wertheim-Freudenberg (1812–present) ===
Picture	Name	Father	Birth	Marriage	Became Princess	Ceased to be Princess	Death	Spouse
	Countess Ernestine of Pückler-Limpurg	Friedrich Philipp Karl, Graf von Pückler in Limpurg-Sontheim-Speckfeld (Pückler)	24 June 1784	26 August 1800	16 February 1816 husband's accession	26 June 1824		Georg
	Countess Charlotte of Isenburg-Büdingen-Philippseich	Heinrich, Count of Isenburg-Büdingen-Philippseich (Isenburg-Philippseich)	25 Jun 1803	22 January 1827		26 July 1855 husband's death	11 March 1874	Georg
	Countess Olga Clara of Schönburg-Glauchau	Alban, Count of Schönburg-Glauchau (Schönburg)	28 January 1831	20 April 1852	9 August 1861 husband's accession	16 March 1868		Wilhelm
	Countess Wanda of Wylich und Lottum	Wilhelm, 2.Fürst & Herr zu Putbus, Graf von Wylich und Lottum (Wylich und Lottum)	2 December 1867	17 June 1886	10 March 1887 husband's accession	10 March 1930		Ernst
	Countess Margarete of Castell-Castell	Friedrich Carl, 1.Fürst zu Castell-Castell (Castell-Castell)	27 October 1899	3 May 1922	20 April 1931 husband's accession	24 December 1969		Udo
	Ruth Erika von Buggenhagen	Johann Detlof von Buggenhagen	25 June 1922	9 September 1950	26 December 1980 husband's accession	15 October 2009		Alfred-Ernst

=== Löwenstein-Wertheim-Rochefort (1712–1803) ===
Picture	Name	Father	Birth	Marriage	Became Princess	Ceased to be Princess	Death	Spouse
	Countess Maria Polyxena Khuen von Lichtenberg und Belasi	Mathias, Graf Khuen von Belasi (Khuen von Belasi)	14 July 1658	26 August 1678	1712 husband raised to Prince	12 November 1712		Maximilian Karl
	Landgravine Christine of Hesse-Wanfried	Charles, Landgrave of Hesse-Wanfried (Hesse-Wanfried)	23 May 1688	28 February 1712	26 December 1718 husband's accession	17 July 1728		Dominic Marquard
	Princess Maria Charlotte of Schleswig-Holstein-Sonderburg-Wiesenburg	Leopold, Duke of Schleswig-Holstein-Sonderburg-Wiesenburg (Oldenburg)	18 February 1718	7 July 1736		4 June 1765		Karl Thomas
	Princess Leopoldine of Hohenlohe-Waldenburg-Bartenstein	Louis, Prince of Hohenlohe-Waldenburg-Bartenstein (Hohenlohe)	16 May 1762	9 May 1780	6 June 1789 husband's accession	1783; Princely title changed	15 febbraio 1807	Dominic Constantine

=== Löwenstein-Wertheim-Rosenberg (1803–present) ===
Picture	Name	Father	Birth	Marriage	Became Princess	Ceased to be Princess	Death	Spouse
	Princess Leopoldine of Hohenlohe-Waldenburg-Bartenstein	Louis, Prince of Hohenlohe-Waldenburg-Bartenstein (Hohenlohe)	16 May 1762	9 May 1780	1783; Princely title changed	15 February 1807		Dominic Constantine
	Countess Maria Kreszentia of Königsegg-Rothenfels	Franz Fidelis, Count of Königsegg-Rothenfels (Königsegg)	30 January 1786	15 April 1807		18 April 1814 husband's death	13 December 1821	Dominic Constantine
	Countess Sophie of Windisch-Grätz	Joseph Nicholas of Windisch-Graetz (Windisch-Graetz)	21 June 1784	29 September 1799	18 April 1814 husband's accession	7 July 1848		Charles Thomas
	Princess Adelheid of Isenburg-Büdingen-Birstein	Prince Victor Alexander of Isenburg-Büdingen (Isenburg-Büdingen-Birstein)	10 February 1841	18 October 1859		2 March 1861		Charles
	Princess Sophie of Liechtenstein	Aloys II, Prince of Liechtenstein (Liechtenstein)	11 July 1837	4 May 1863		25 September 1899		Charles
	Countess Josephine Kinsky of Wchinitz and Tettau	Count Friedrich Karl Kinsky of Wchinitz und Tettau (Kinsky)	23 August 1874	27 September 1898	1908 husband's accession	23 April 1946		Aloys
	Carolina dei Conti Rignon	Eduardo, Conte Rignon	17 February 1904	7 January 1935	25 January 1952 husband's accession	20 September 1975		Karl II
	Princess Anastasia of Prussia	Prince Hubertus of Prussia (Hohenzollern)	14 February 1944	8 October 1965	23 August 1990 husband's accession	16 August 2026		Alois-Konstantin
