= Constantine, Hereditary Prince of Löwenstein-Wertheim-Rosenberg =

Hereditary Prince of Löwenstein-Wertheim-Rosenberg (1802–1838)

Constantine
- Hereditary Prince of Löwenstein-Wertheim-Rosenberg
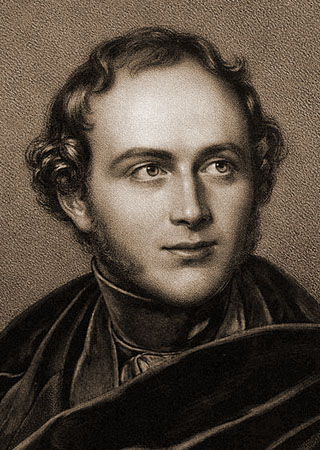
- Constantine, Hereditary Prince of Löwenstein-Wertheim-Rosenberg
- Born: 28 September 1802; Kleinheubach, near Miltenberg
- Died: 27 December 1838 (aged 36); Kleinheubach, near Miltenberg
- Spouse: Princess Agnes of Hohenlohe-Langenburg (m. 1829, died 1835)
- Issue: Adelaide, Queen of Portugal; Charles, Prince of Löwenstein-Wertheim-Rosenberg
- House: Löwenstein-Wertheim-Rosenberg
- Father: Charles Thomas, Prince of Löwenstein-Wertheim-Rosenberg
- Mother: Countess Sophie of Windisch-Grätz

Constantine Joseph, Hereditary Prince of Löwenstein-Wertheim-Rosenberg (in the original German, Konstantin Joseph, 28 September 1802, in Kleinheubach, near Miltenberg – 27 December 1838, in Kleinheubach), was the eldest son and heir of Charles Thomas, Prince of Löwenstein-Wertheim-Rosenberg, and Sophie of Windisch-Graetz. He died before his father.

== Family ==
His paternal grandparents were Dominic Constantine, Prince of Löwenstein-Wertheim-Rochefort (1762–1814) and his first wife Princess Marie Leopoldine of Hohenlohe-Bartenstein. Dominic had inherited the title "Löwenstein-Wertheim-Rochefort" in 1780 but modified it to "Löwenstein-Wertheim-Rosenberg" in 1789. His maternal grandparents were Joseph Nicholas, Count of Windisch-Graetz and his second wife Duchess Leopoldine of Arenberg (1751–1812).

Dominic Constantine was the eldest son of Theodore Alexander, Prince of Löwenstein-Wertheim-Rochefort (1722–1780) and his wife Catharine Louise Eleonore, Countess of Leiningen-Dagsburg-Hartenburg.

Theodore Alexander was a son of Dominic Marquard, Prince of Löwenstein-Wertheim-Rochefort (1690–1735) and his wife Princess Christina of Hesse-Wanfried. Christina was a daughter of Charles, Landgrave of Hesse-Wanfried. Charles was the second son of Ernest, Landgrave of Hesse-Rheinfels.

Dominic Marquard was a son of Maximilian Karl Albert, Prince of Löwenstein-Wertheim-Rochefort (1656–1718) and his wife Polyxena Maria, Countess Khuen von Lichtenberg und Belasi. His father had served as governor of Milan, representing Charles VI, Holy Roman Emperor until his own death.

Maximilian was a son of Ferdinand Karl, Count of Löwenstein-Wertheim-Rochefort (1616–1672) and his wife Anna Maria, Countess of Fürstenberg.

Ferdinand Karl was a son of Johann Dietrich, Count of Löwenstein-Wertheim-Rochefort (1585–1644) and his first wife Josina von der Marck.

Johann Dietrich was a younger son of Louis III, Count of Löwenstein-Wertheim (1530–1611) and his wife Anna, Countess of Stolberg. His father had served as governor of Styria, Carinthia and Carniola, representing rulers of the House of Habsburg.

Louis was a younger son of Frederick I, Count of Löwenstein (1502–1541) and his wife Countess Helene of Königsegg.

Frederick was a son of Louis I, Count of Löwenstein and his first wife Elisabeth, Countess of Montfort.

Louis was a son of Frederick I, Count Palatine of the Rhine and his morganatic wife Clara Tott. Children from this marriage had no right to the throne of the Palatinate but represented a secondary line of the Wittelsbach.

== Marriage and children ==
On 31 May 1829, Constantine married Princess Agnes of Hohenlohe-Langenburg. She was a daughter of Charles Louis, Prince of Hohenlohe-Langenburg (1762–1825) and Amalia, Countess of Solms-Baruth. They had two children:

- Adelaide of Löwenstein-Wertheim-Rosenberg (3 April 1831 – 16 December 1909). In 1851, she married the former King Miguel of Braganza, who reigned in Portugal from 1828 to 1834.
- Charles, Prince of Löwenstein-Wertheim-Rosenberg (21 May 1834 – 8 November 1921). Married Princess Sophie of Liechtenstein. She was a daughter of Alois II, Prince of Liechtenstein and Countess Franziska Kinsky of Wchinitz and Tettau.

== Ancestry ==
Ancestors of Constantine, Hereditary Prince of Löwenstein-Wertheim-Rosenberg

16. Dominic Marquard, Prince of Löwenstein-Wertheim-Rochefort
8. Prince Theodor Alexander of Löwenstein-Wertheim-Rochefort
17. Landgravine Christine of Hesse-Rheinfels-Wanfried
4. Dominic Constantine, Prince of Löwenstein-Wertheim-Rochefort
18. Karl Ludwig, Count of Leiningen-Dagsburg-Hartenburg
9. Countess Catharine Louise Eleonore of Leiningen-Dagsburg-Hartenburg
19. Karoline, Wild- and Rhingravine of Salm-Dhaun
2. Charles Thomas, Prince of Löwenstein-Wertheim-Rosenberg
20. Karl Philipp, Prince of Hohenlohe-Bartenstein
10. Ludwig Leopold, Prince of Hohenlohe-Bartenstein
21. Landgravine Sophie of Hesse-Homburg
5. Princess Leopoldine of Hohenlohe-Bartenstein
22. Christian Otto, Count of Limburg-Stirum
11. Countess Polyxene of Limburg-Stirum
23. Princess Karoline Juliane Sophie of Hohenlohe-Waldenburg-Schillingsfürst
1. Constantine, Hereditary Prince of Löwenstein-Wertheim-Rosenberg
24. Leopold Johann, Count of Windisch-Grätz
12. Leopold Karl, Count of Windisch-Grätz
25. Countess Maria Ernesta of Strassoldo
6. Joseph Nikolaus, Count of Windisch-Grätz
26. Ludwig Andreas of Khevenhüller, Count of Frankenburg
13. Countess Maria Antonia of Khevenhüller
27. Countess Philippina Maria of Lamberg
3. Countess Sophie of Windisch-Grätz
28. Léopold-Philippe, Duke of Arenberg
14. Charles Marie Raymond of Arenberg
29. Maria Francesca Pignatelli, Duchess of Bisaccia
7. Princess and Duchess Léopoldine of Arenberg
30. Louis Engelbert, Duke de La Marck
15. Countess Louise-Marguerite de La Marck-Schleiden
31. Marie Anne de Visdelou de Bienassis

== Sources ==
- "Lines of Succession: Heraldry of the Royal Families of Europe" by Jirí Louda and Michael MacLagan.
