= Charles Albert II of Hohenlohe-Waldenburg-Schillingsfürst =

Charles Albert II
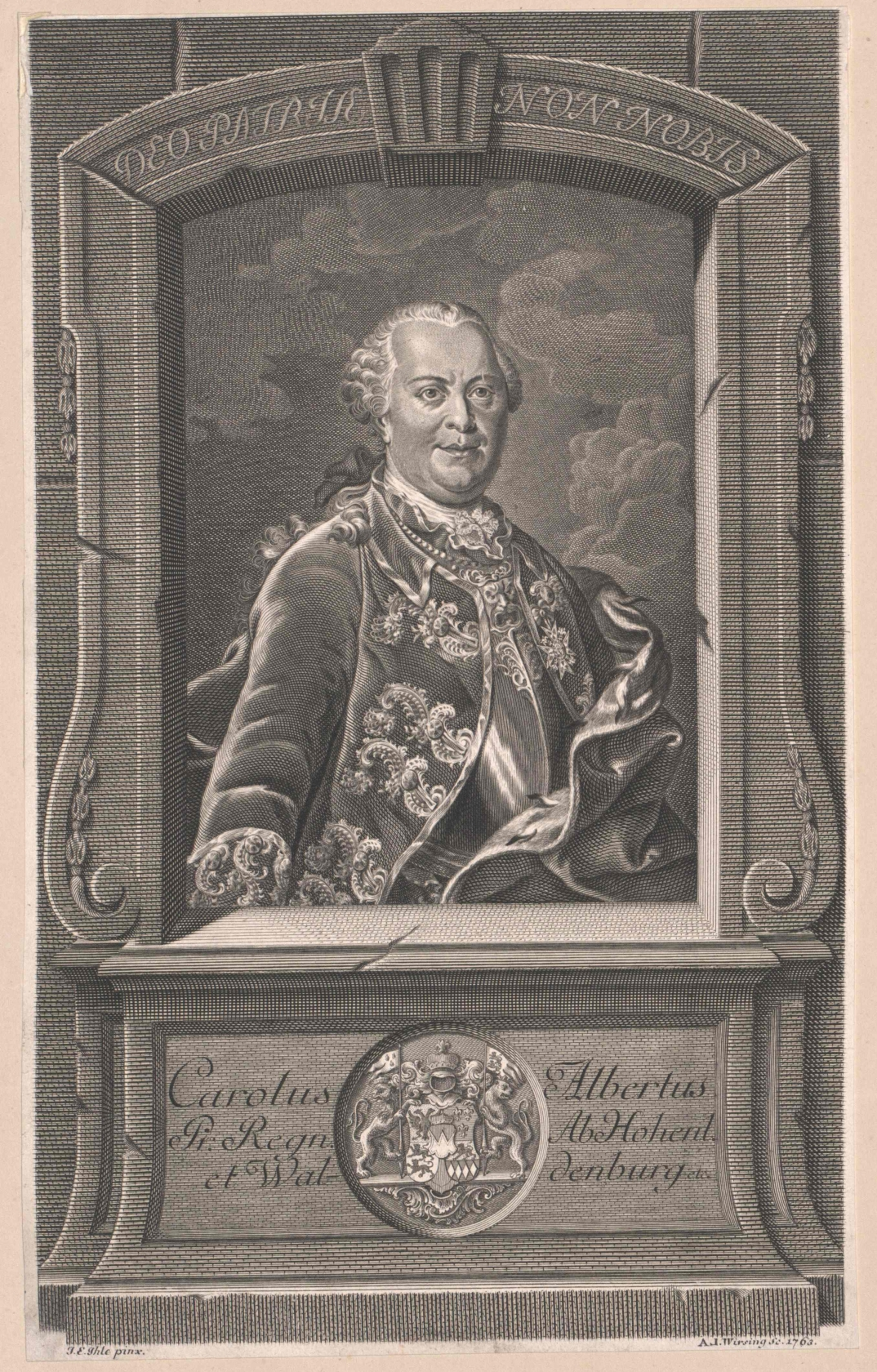

Prince of Hohenlohe-Waldenburg-Schillingsfürst
- Period: 25 January 1793 – 14 June 1796
- Born: 21 February 1742; Schillingsfürst
- Died: 14 June 1796 (aged 54); Schillingsfürst
- Spouse: Princess Leopodine of Löwenstein-Wertheim-Rochefort; Baroness Judith Reviczky de Revisnye
- Issue: Charles Albert III, Prince of Hohenlohe-Waldenburg-Schillingsfürst; Franz Joseph, Prince of Hohenlohe-Schillingsfürst; Prince Alexander
Names
- German: Karl Albrecht Philipp Ludwig Franz de Paula
- House: House of Hohenlohe-Waldenburg-Schillingsfürst
- Father: Charles Albert I, Prince of Hohenlohe-Waldenburg-Schillingsfürst
- Mother: Princess Sophie Wilhelmine of Löwenstein-Wertheim-Rochefort

Charles Albert II, Prince of Hohenlohe-Waldenburg-Schillingsfürst (21 February 1742 – 14 June 1796) was the 3rd Prince of Hohenlohe-Waldenburg-Schillingsfürst from 1793 to 1796.

== Early life ==
Born as a member of the House of Hohenlohe, Charles Albert II was the only child of Charles Albert I, Prince of Hohenlohe-Waldenburg-Schillingsfürst (1719–1793) and his first wife Princess Sophie Wilhelmine of Löwenstein-Wertheim-Rochefort (1721–1749), a daughter of Dominic Marquard, Prince of Löwenstein-Wertheim-Rochefort.

== Personal life ==
On 19 May 1761, he married as his first wife his cousin Princess Leopodine of Löwenstein-Wertheim-Rochefort (1739–1765), daughter of his mother's brother Charles Thomas, 3rd Prince of Löwenstein-Wertheim-Rochefort, by who he had two children:

- Prince Franz of Hohenlohe-Waldenburg-Schillingsfürst, died at the age of two months
- A Princess who was born and died on 2 June 1765

Princess Leopodine died a week later from complications of childbirth.

On 15 August 1773 he married his second wife the Hungarian Baroness Judith Reviczky de Revisnye (1751–1836) by whom he had the following children:

- Princess Maria Josepha of Hohenlohe-Waldenburg-Schillingsfürst (1774–1824) married Count Maximilian Joseph von Holnstein, a grandchild of Charles VII, Holy Roman Emperor by his mistress Maria Caroline Charlotte von Ingenheim and had issue
- Charles Albert III, 4th Prince of Hohenlohe-Waldenburg-Schillingsfürst (1776–1843) successor to his father, married twice, first time to Princess Auguste von Isenburg-Büdingen-Birstein (1779–1803), second time to Princess Leopoldine zu Fürstenberg (1791–1844) and had issue from both marriages
- Prince Joseph of Hohenlohe-Waldenburg-Schillingsfürst (1777–1800)
- Princess Maria Theresia of Hohenlohe-Waldenburg-Schillingsfürst (1779–1819) married Count Moritz von Fries and had issue
- Princess Franziska of Hohenlohe-Waldenburg-Schillingsfürst (1780–1783)
- Prince Albert of Hohenlohe-Waldenburg-Schillingsfürst (1781–1805)
- Princess Antoinette of Hohenlohe-Waldenburg-Schillingsfürst (1783–1803)
- Princess Friederike of Hohenlohe-Waldenburg-Schillingsfürst (born and died in June 1785)
- Princess Eleonore of Hohenlohe-Waldenburg-Schillingsfürst (1786–1849) unmarried
- Franz Joseph, 1st Prince of Hohenlohe-Schillingsfürst (1787–1841) founder of the branch of the Dukes of Ratibor and Princes of Corvey, married Princess Konstanze of Hohenlohe-Langenburg
- Princess Karoline of Hohenlohe-Waldenburg-Schillingsfürst (1789–1799)
- Princess Gabriele of Hohenlohe-Waldenburg-Schillingsfürst (1791–1863) married Baron Karl von Brinkmann (1789-1859)
- Prince Alexander of Hohenlohe-Waldenburg-Schillingsfürst (1794–1849) a Roman Catholic priest

== Ancestry ==
Ancestors of Charles Albert II of Hohenlohe-Waldenburg-Schillingsfürst

8. Ludwig Gustav, Count of Hohenlohe-Waldenburg-Schillingsfurst
4. Philipp Ernst, 1st Prince of Hohenlohe-Waldenburg-Schillingsfürst
9. Countess Maria Eleonore of Hatzfeld-Gleichen
2. Charles Albert I, 2nd Prince of Hohenlohe-Waldenburg-Schillingsfürst
10. Count Philipp Karl of Oettingen-Wallerstein
5. Countess Maria Anna of Oettingen-Wallerstein
11. Countess Sophie Juliane of Oettingen-Oettingen
1. Charles Albert II, 3rd Prince of Hohenlohe-Waldenburg-Schillingsfürst
12. Maximilian Karl, Prince of Löwenstein-Wertheim-Rochefort
6. Dominic Marquard, Prince of Löwenstein-Wertheim-Rochefort
13. Maria Polyxena of Khuen-Belasi-Lichtenberg
3. Countess Sophie Wilhelmine of Löwenstein-Wertheim-Rochefort
14. Charles, Landgrave of Hesse-Wanfried
7. Landgravine Christine of Hesse-Wanfried
15. Countess Alexandrine Juliane of Leiningen-Dagsburg-Falkenburg

== Sources ==
- Karl Albrecht II, Fürst zu Hohenlohe-Waldenburg in Schillingsfürst
