= Charles Albert III of Hohenlohe-Waldenburg-Schillingsfürst =

Charles Albert III
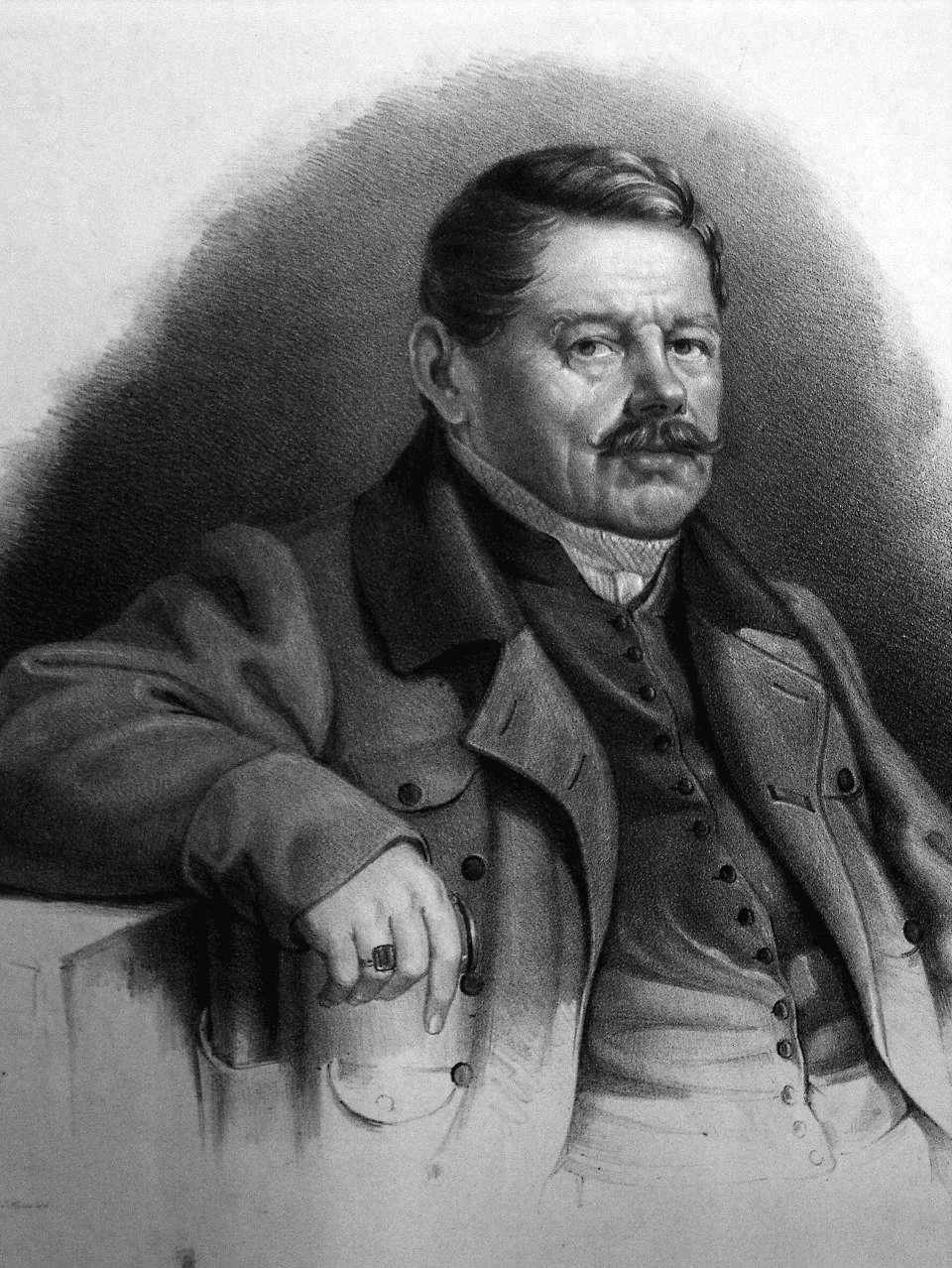
- Lithograph by Bonaventura Weiss, c. 1840

Prince of Hohenlohe-Waldenburg-Schillingsfürst
- Period: 14 June 1796 - 15 June 1843
- Born: 28 February 1776; Vienna
- Died: 15 June 1843 (aged 67); Bad Mergentheim
- Spouse: Princess Auguste of Isenburg and Büdingen in Birstein; Princess Leopodine of Fürstenberg
- Issue: Katharina, Princess of Hohenzollern-Sigmaringen
Names
- German: Karl Albrecht Philipp Joseph
- House: Hohenlohe-Waldenburg-Schillingsfürst
- Father: Charles Albert II, Prince of Hohenlohe-Waldenburg-Schillingsfürst
- Mother: Baroness Judith Reviczky de Revisnye

Charles Albert III, Prince of Hohenlohe-Waldenburg-Schillingsfürst (28 February 1776 – 15 June 1843) was the 4th Prince of Hohenlohe-Waldenburg-Schillingsfürst from 1796 to 1843.

== Early life ==
Charles Albert III was the second child, and first son, of Charles Albert II, Prince of Hohenlohe-Waldenburg-Schillingsfürst (1742–1796), by his second wife, the Hungarian Baroness Judith Reviczky de Revisnye (1751–1836). His brother, Franz Joseph, was the founder of the branch of the Dukes of Ratibor and Princes of Corvey.

His paternal grandparents were Charles Albert I, 2nd Prince of Hohenlohe-Waldenburg-Schillingsfürst and Countess Sophie Wilhelmine of Löwenstein-Wertheim-Rochefort (a daughter of Dominic Marquard, Prince of Löwenstein-Wertheim-Rochefort). His maternal grandparents were Baron Johann Kazimir Reviczky de Revisnye and Baroness Rosalie Perényi de Perény.

== Personal life ==
On 11 July 1797 in Munich, he married his first wife, Princess Auguste of Isenburg and Büdingen in Birstein, a granddaughter of Wolfgang Ernst I of Isenburg-Birstein from his third marriage. Before her death in 1803, they had three children, only one of whom lived to adulthood:

- Prince(ss) of Hohenlohe-Waldenburg-Schillingsfürst (1798–1798), who died at birth.
- Princess Karoline of Hohenlohe-Waldenburg-Schillingsfürst (1800–1857)
- Prince(ss) of Hohenlohe-Waldenburg-Schillingsfürst (1802–1802), who died at birth.

He married again on 30 May 1813 in Heiligenberg to Princess Leopodine of Fürstenberg (1791–1844), a daughter of Karl Aloys zu Fürstenberg and Princess Elisabeth of Thurn and Taxis (a daughter of Alexander Ferdinand, 3rd Prince of Thurn and Taxis). Together, they had four children:

- Friedrich Karl, 5th Prince of Hohenlohe-Waldenburg-Schillingsfürst (1814–1884), who married his first cousin, Princess Theresa of Hohenlohe-Schillingsfürst, a daughter of Franz Joseph, Prince of Hohenlohe-Schillingsfürst.
- Princess Katharina of Hohenlohe-Waldenburg-Schillingsfürst (1817–1893), who married twice, her second marriage was with Karl, Prince of Hohenzollern-Sigmaringen, both marriages were childless.
- Prince Karl of Hohenlohe-Waldenburg-Schillingsfürst (1818–1875), who married Countess Theresa Meraviglia-Crivelli and had issue.
- Prince Egon of Hohenlohe-Waldenburg-Schillingsfürst (1819–1865), who married Countess Therese Thurn-Hofer und Valsassina and had issue.

Prince Charles Albert and Princess Leopoldine separated few years later, with the Prince withdrawing to live in his Hohenlohe estates.

=== Descendants ===
Through his eldest son Friedrich Karl, he was a grandfather of Chlodwig Karl Joseph Maria, Prince of Hohenlohe-Waldenburg-Schillingsfürst, and great-grandfather of Friedrich Franz von Hohenlohe-Waldenburg-Schillingsfürst,

Through his youngest son Egon, he was a grandfather of Princess Marie of Hohenlohe-Waldenburg-Schillingsfürst, who married Prince Alexander Johann of Thurn and Taxis and was the mother of Alessandro, 1st Duke of Castel Duino.

== Ancestry ==
Ancestors of Charles Albert III of Hohenlohe-Waldenburg-Schillingsfürst

16. Ludwig Gustav, Count of Hohenlohe-Waldenburg-Schillingsfurst
8. Philipp Ernst, 1st Prince of Hohenlohe-Waldenburg-Schillingsfürst
17. Countess Maria Eleonore of Hatzfeld-Gleichen
4. Charles Albert I, 2nd Prince of Hohenlohe-Waldenburg-Schillingsfürst
18. Count Philipp Karl of Oettingen-Wallerstein
9. Countess Maria Anna of Oettingen-Wallerstein
19. Countess Sophie Juliane of Oettingen-Oettingen
2. Charles Albert II, 3rd Prince of Hohenlohe-Waldenburg-Schillingsfürst
20. Maximilian Karl, Prince of Löwenstein-Wertheim-Rochefort
10. Dominic Marquard, Prince of Löwenstein-Wertheim-Rochefort
21. Maria Polyxena of Khuen-Belasi-Lichtenberg
5. Countess Sophie Wilhelmine of Löwenstein-Wertheim-Rochefort
22. Charles, Landgrave of Hesse-Wanfried
11. Landgravine Christine of Hesse-Wanfried
23. Countess Alexandrine Juliane of Leiningen-Dagsburg-Falkenburg
1. Charles Albert III, 4th Prince of Hohenlohe-Waldenburg-Schillingsfürst
24. Mátyás Reviczky de Revisnye
12. Baron András Reviczky de Revisnye
25. Ilona Okolicsányi
6. Baron Johann Kazimir Reviczky de Revisnye
26. János Nedeczky de Nedecze
13. Julianna Nedeczky de Nedecze
27. Zsuzsanna Ordódy de Ordód et Alsólieszkó
3. Baroness Judith Reviczky de Revisnye
28. Baron Ádám Perényi de Perény
14. Baron Adám Perényi de Perény
29. Éva Pethő de Gerse
7. Baroness Rosalie Perényi de Perény
30. György IV Fráter
15. Erzsébet Fráter
31. Zsófia Balló de Diod

== Sources ==
- Karl Albrecht III, Fürst zu Hohenlohe-Waldenburg in Schillingsfürst
