= Charles Thomas, Prince of Löwenstein-Wertheim-Rosenberg =

Prince of Löwenstein-Wertheim-Rosenberg (1783–1849)

Charles Thomas
- Prince of Löwenstein-Wertheim-Rosenberg
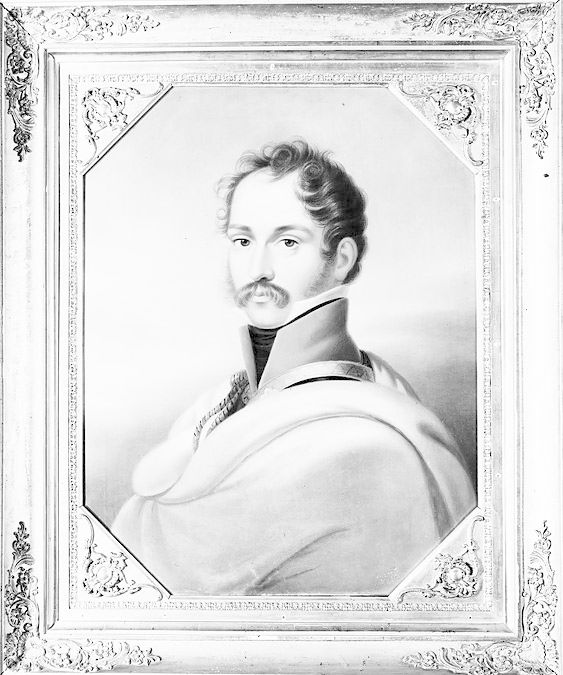

Prince of Löwenstein-Wertheim-Rosenberg
- Reign: 18 April 1814 – 3 November 1849
- Predecessor: Dominic Constantine
- Successor: Charles Henry
- Born: 18 July 1783; Bartenstein (today part of Schrozberg)
- Died: 3 November 1849 (aged 66); Heidelberg
- Spouse: Countess Sophie of Windisch-Grätz (m. 1799; died 1848)
- Issue: Constantine, Hereditary Prince of Löwenstein-Wertheim-Rosenberg; Marie Leopoldine; Marie Louise Adelaide; Sophia Maria Theresa; Maria Kreszentia; Aegidia Eulalie
Names
- German: Karl Thomas Albrecht Ludwig Joseph Constantin
- House: House of Löwenstein-Wertheim-Rosenberg
- Father: Dominic Constantine, Prince of Löwenstein-Wertheim-Rochefort
- Mother: Princess Leopoldine of Hohenlohe-Bartenstein

Charles Thomas Albert Louis Joseph Constantine, 5th Prince of Löwenstein-Wertheim-Rosenberg (in the original German, Karl (or Carl) Thomas Albrecht Ludwig Joseph Konstantin, 18 July 1783 in Bartenstein (today part of Schrozberg) – 3 November 1849 in Heidelberg) was an Austrian officer during the Napoleonic Wars and from 1814 onwards, a member of the landless high nobility.

== Background ==
The noble zu Löwenstein family dates back to the days of Elector Palatine Frederick the Victorious (1425–1476). His children from his morganatic marriage with Clara Tott were not able to inherit the Wittelsbach properties, so they formed a separate noble family. After the death of Count Louis III in 1611, the family was split into two main lines, the Protestant Löwenstein-Wertheim-Virneburg line (later Freudenberg) and the Catholic Löwenstein-Wertheim-Rochefort line.

== Life ==
Prince Charles Thomas was the first-born son from the marriage of Prince Dominic Constantine, Prince of Löwenstein-Wertheim-Rochefort (1762–1814) with Maria Leopoldine, Princess of Hohenlohe-Bartenstein (1761–1807). Prince Charles had six sisters and three half siblings from his father's second marriage. He and his younger brother Constantine were raised during the final years of the Holy Roman Empire. They were very aware of the privileges of the class of Imperial Princes. They were educated at court in Würzburg and later at the court of Prince Clemens Wenceslaus of Saxony, the Prince-Elector of Trier. Nothing is known about any higher education that Charles Thomas may have enjoyed. In 1802, he participated in a diplomatic mission of the Löwenstein-Wertheim-Rosenberg family to Paris.

His father's territory was mediatized during the events following the French Revolution. The Löwenstein territories were divided between the newly elevated Grand Duchies of Baden and Hesse and the Kingdoms of Bavaria and Württemberg. Charles Thomas joined the Austrian army and fought in several battles of the Napoleonic Wars. Most recently, he served as major in the Galician Ulanes Regiment "Prince of Schwarzenberg" No. 2. In 1812 and 1813, the family lost its territory on the left bank of the Rhine, including Rochefort. This led to a name change: the House of Löwenstein-Wertheim-Rochefort changed its name to Löwenstein-Wertheim-Rosenberg.

In 1814, Charles Thomas's father died. He resigned from the military and took up administration of the family possessions. As a member of the high nobility, he held a seat in the First Chamber in Baden, Bavaria, Hesse and Württemberg. However, he had little interest in the political issues of those four states. Initially, his senior officials concerned themselves with the interests of the high nobility. From the early 1830s, his son Constatine did the same. After Constantine died in 1838, the senior officials took over again. Throughout his life, Charles Thomas felt a strong bond with the Austrian Empire and its ruling Habsburg dynasty. He married an Austrian wife and took up permanent residence in Vienna in the 1840s. As he grew older, he devoted more and more time to his Catholic faith and developed a devotion, which served as a model for his grandson and successor Charles Henry.

== Marriage and issue ==
Thomas Charles married on 29 September 1799 in Ellwangen to Countess Sophie of Windisch-Grätz (1784–1848), a daughter of Count Joseph Nicholas of Windisch-Graetz by his second wife, Duchess Maria Leopoldine Franziska of Arenberg (1751–1812). They had the following children:

- Constantine (1802–1838), married to Princess Agnes of Hohenlohe-Langenburg (1804–1835);
- Marie Leopoldine, (1804–1869), married to her uncle, Prince Constantine of Löwenstein-Wertheim-Rosenberg (1786–1844);
- Marie Louise Adelaide Eulalia (1806–1884), married to Prince Camille of Rohan (1800–1892);
- Sophia Maria Theresa (1809–1838), married to Prince Heinrich XX of Reuss-Greiz;
- Maria Kreszentia Octavie (1813–1878), married to Prince Victor Alexander of Isenburg und Büdingen zu Birnstein;
- Aegidia Eulalie (1820–1895)

== Footnotes ==
Charles Thomas, 5th Prince of Löwenstein-Wertheim-Rosenberg House of Löwenstein-Wertheim-Rosenberg Cadet branch of the House of Löwenstein-Wertheim Born: 18 July 1783 Died: 3 November 1849
German nobility
Preceded by Dominic Constantine	Prince of Löwenstein-Wertheim-Rosenberg; 18 April 1814 – 3 November 1849	Succeeded by Charles Henry
