= Charles Thomas, Prince of Löwenstein-Wertheim-Rochefort =

Charles Thomas
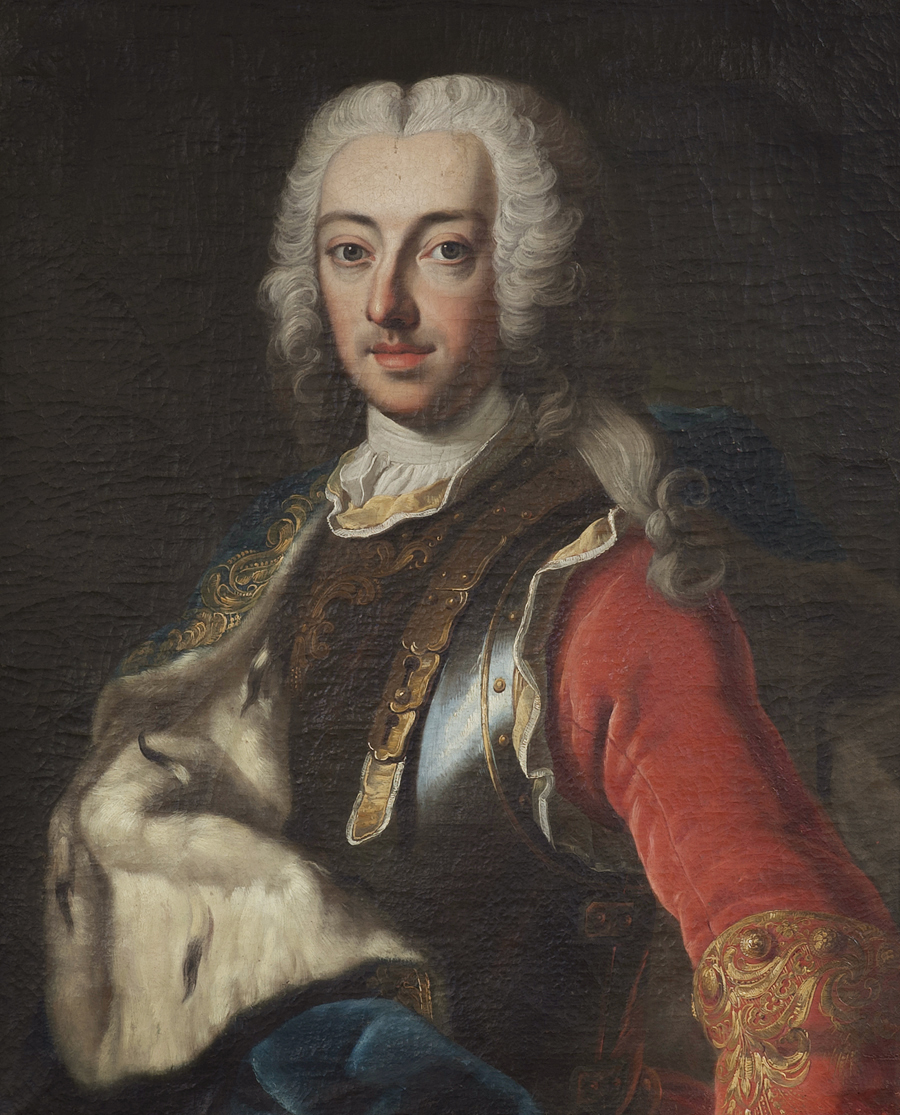

Prince of Löwenstein-Wertheim-Rochefort
- Period: 11 March 1735 – 6 June 1789
- Predecessor: Dominic Marquard
- Successor: Dominic Constantine
- Born: 7 March 1714; Augsburg
- Died: 6 June 1789 (aged 75); Kleinheubach
- Spouse: Princess Maria Charlotte of Schleswig-Holstein-Sonderburg-Wiesenburg; Maria Josepha von Stipplin (morganatic)
- Issue: Leopoldine, Princess of Hohenlohe-Waldenburg-Schillingsfürst
Names
- German: Karl Thomas
- House: House of Löwenstein-Wertheim-Rochefort
- Father: Dominic Marquard, Prince of Löwenstein-Wertheim-Rochefort
- Mother: Landgravine Christine of Hesse-Wanfried

Charles Thomas, 3rd Prince of Löwenstein-Wertheim-Rochefort (in the original German, Karl Thomas, 7 March 1714 – 6 June 1789) was from 1735 to 1789 the third Prince of Löwenstein-Wertheim-Rochefort.

== Family ==
Charles Thomas was the eldest son and second children of Dominic Marquard, 2nd Prince of Löwenstein-Wertheim-Rochefort and his wife Landravine Christine Franziska Polyxena of Hesse-Wanfried, a daughter of Charles, Landgrave of Hesse-Wanfried and his second wife Countess Juliane Alexandrine of Leiningen-Dagsburg.

On 7 July 1736 in Vienna he married Princess Maria Charlotte of Holstein-Wiesenburg, daughter of Leopold, Duke of Schleswig-Holstein-Sonderburg-Wiesenburg. Their only child and daughter Leopoldine was born in 1739, and married in 1761 her cousin, Charles Albert II, Prince of Hohenlohe-Waldenburg-Schillingsfürst. After the death of his first wife, he married morganatically on 4 February 1770 Maria Josepha von Stipplin. This marriage was without issue.

== Study ==
Charles Thomas studied in Prague and in Paris. From 1735 he was a corresponding member of the Académie Française and during his life he hold a large library.

== Military career ==
On 4 May 1758 he was made a Palatine Lieutenant General and on 31 December 1769 imperial Lieutenant Fieldmarshal.

== Reign ==
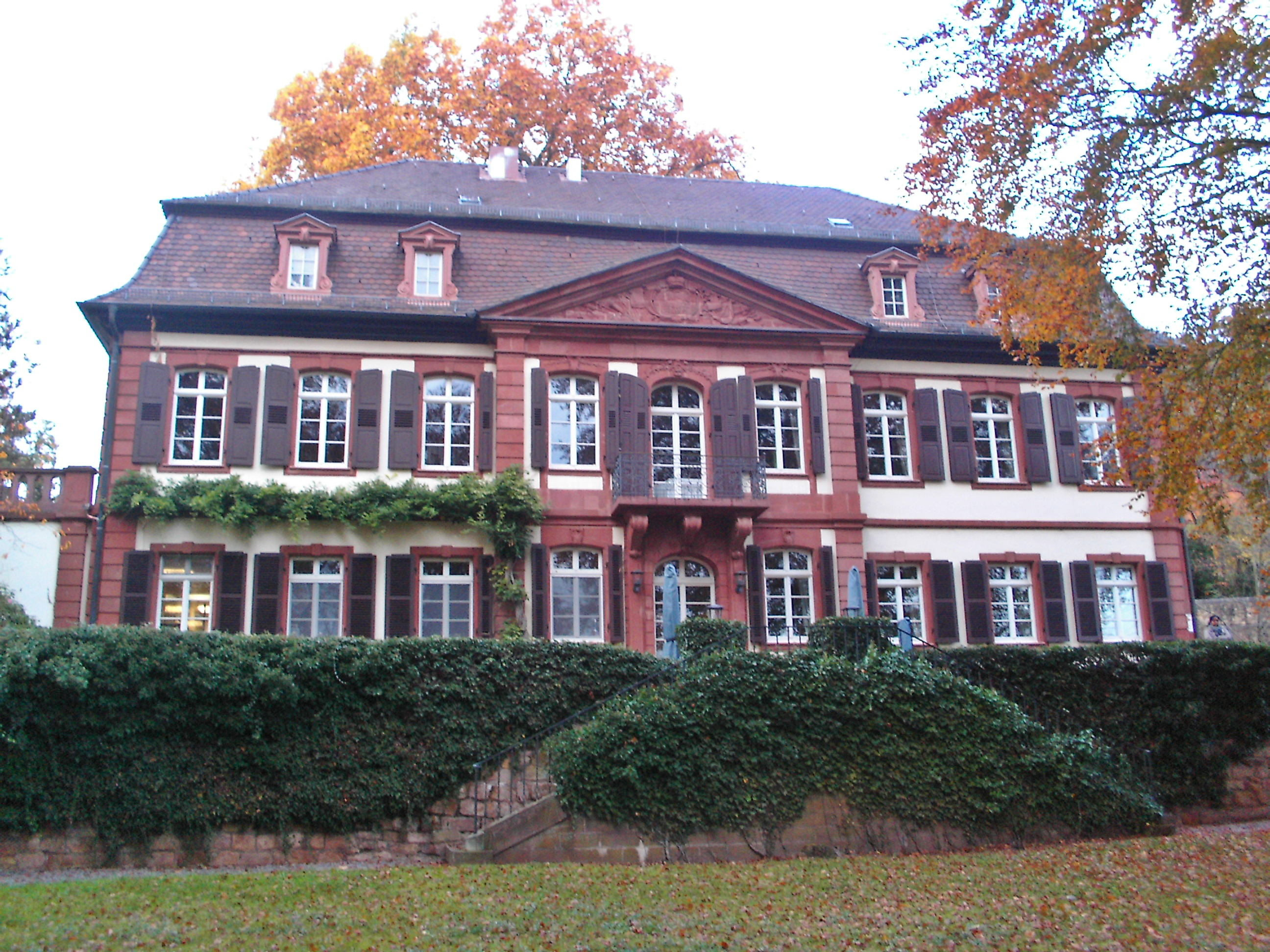
Schloss Löwensteiner, in Albersweiler-St. Johann

== Successor ==
After more than fifty years as reigning prince and without legitimate male heirs, Charles Thomas was succeeded after his death by his nephew, Dominic Constantine, son of his youngest brother Prince Theodor Alexander of Löwenstein-Wertheim-Rochefort.

== Bibliography ==
- Harald Stockert: Adel im Übergang. Die Fürsten und Grafen von Löwenstein-Wertheim zwischen Landesherrschaft und Standesherrschaft 1780-1850, Kohlhammer Verlag, Stuttgart 2000, ISBN 3-17-016605-0
- Christian Schreck: Hofstaat und Verwaltung der Fürsten von Löwenstein-Wertheim-Rochefort im 18. Jahrhundert. Leidorf, Rahden/Westfalen, 2006

Charles Thomas, Prince of Löwenstein-Wertheim-Rochefort House of Löwenstein Born: 7 March 1714 Died: 6 June 1789
Preceded by Dominic Marquard	Prince of Löwenstein-Wertheim-Rochefort; 1735–1789	Succeeded by Dominic Constantine
