= Louis III of Löwenstein =

Louis III, Count of Löwenstein
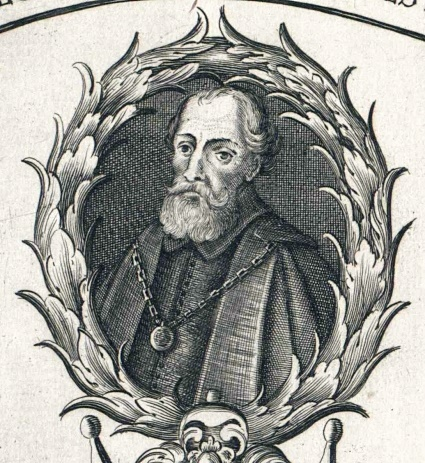
- Born: 17 February 1530; Vaihingen
- Died: 13 March 1611 (aged 81); Wertheim
- Noble family: House of Löwenstein
- Spouse: Anna of Stolberg
- Father: Frederick I of Löwenstein
- Mother: Helene of Königsegg

Louis III, Count of Löwenstein (17 February 1530 in Vaihingen † 13 March 1611 in Wertheim) was the ruling Count of Löwenstein-Wertheim from 1571 until his death.

== Life ==
Louis III was a son of Count Frederick I of Löwenstein (1502–1541) (a son of Count Louis I) and his wife Helene of Königsegg (1509–1566).

At the age of 18 he arrived at the imperial court in Vienna, where he was given command of a cavalry regiment with 1000 horses. A short time later he went to Burgundy, where he worked for the Elector Palatine Frederick II as ambassador to various courts. In 1557, he was sent to the Diet of Regensburg, where he acted as imperial councillor to King Ferdinand I, despite being a Protestant himself. He later represented Emperor Maximilian II at several diets. In 1559, he was appointed as president of the Aulic Council. Archduke Charles II of Styria appointed him governor of Carinthia, Carniola and Styria.

Louis possessed the County of Löwenstein, which was under the sovereignty of the Duchy of Württemberg. On 3 September 1566, he married Countess Anna of Stolberg (1548–1599), the daughter of Count Louis of Stolberg. He had originally sought to marry Anna's older sister Catherine, who was married to Michael III, the last count of Wertheim. After Michael III died in 1566, Louis of Stolberg inherited Wertheim. When he died in 1574 without a male heir, the Lordship of Rochefort fell to his daughter Anna. A dispute broke out between his sons-in-law over the County of Wertheim. Louis III styled himself Count of Löwenstein-Wertheim from 1580 onwards, however, it took 1598 until he could actually secure possession of Wertheim.

Louis of Stolberg's sons-in-law took turns governing the County of Stolberg. These sons-in-law were Louis III, who was married to Anna, the youngest sister, and Count Philip of Eberstein, who had married Catherine, the eldest sister, and Count Dietrich of Manderscheid, who had married, Elisabeth the second sister. After Philip died in 1589 in Remlingen and Dietrich died in 1593 in Schleiden, Louis hoped to rule Stolberg alone. However, Elisabeth then married William of Krichingen, who was a Catholic and who disputed Louis III claims on Stolberg until he died in 1610.

== Issue ==
Louis III and Anna had four sons and seven daughters. Their sons were:

- Christopher Louis (3 May 1568 – 17 February 1618), married in 1592 to Countess Elisabeth Amalie of Manderscheid-Schleiden (27 July 1569 – 26 October 1621), the heiress of the County of Virneburg. Christopher Louis and Elisabeth Amalie founded the Protestant Löwenstein-Wertheim-Virneburg line, which was raised to Princes of Loewenstein-Wertheim-Freudenberg in 1812
- Louis IV (30 May 1569 – 24 August 1635), married:
  1. in 1605 Gertrude of Schutzbar genannt Milchling
  2. in 1634 Countess Juliana of Wied-Runkel (b. c. 1580, the daughter of Count William IV of Wied-Runkel (1560–1612) and Johanna Sibylla of Hanau-Lichtenberg (1564–1636)
- Wolfgang Ernest (5 August 1578 – 26 May 1636), married in 1625 to Countess Barbara of Hohenlohe-Waldenburg (22 June 1592 – March 1665)
- Johann Dietrich, Count of Löwenstein-Wertheim-Rochefort (31 January 1585 – 6 March 1644), married in 1610 to Josina de la Marck (3 January 1583 – 26 February 1626). He was the founder of the Catholic line of Löwenstein-Wertheim-Rosenberg.

== Legacy ==
Louis III tried to regulate the succession after his death in the Statutum gentilicium of 1597. However, after his death, his four sons disputed their inheritance and divided the county in 1611 and 1613.
