= Dominic Constantine, Prince of Löwenstein-Wertheim-Rochefort =

Prince of Löwenstein-Wertheim-Rosenberg (1762–1814)

Dominic Constantine
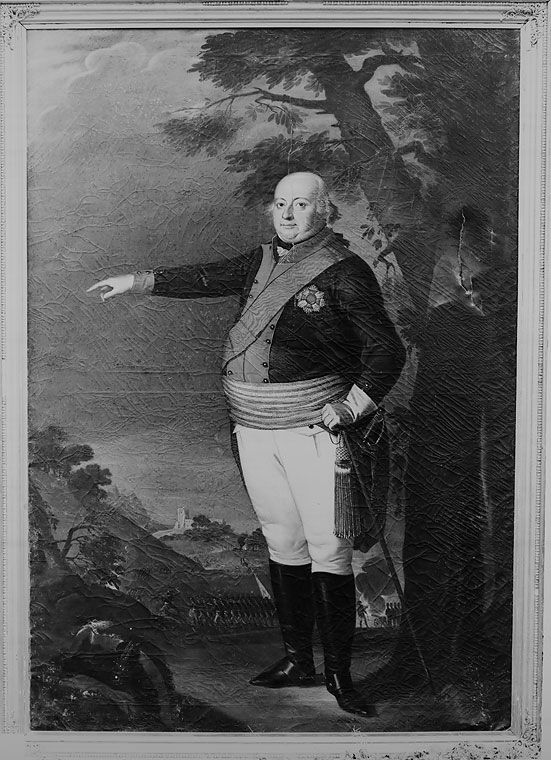

Prince of Löwenstein-Wertheim-Rosenberg
- Reign: 25 February 1803 – 18 April 1814
- Predecessor: Himself as Prince of Löwenstein-Wertheim-Rochefort
- Successor: Charles Thomas

Prince of Löwenstein-Wertheim-Rochefort
- Reign: 6 June 1789 – 25 February 1803
- Predecessor: Charles Thomas
- Successor: Title Changed
- Born: 16 May 1762; Nancy
- Died: 18 April 1814 (aged 51); Frankfurt
- Spouse: Princess Leopoldine of Hohenlohe-Waldenburg-Bartenstein (m. 1780; died 1807) Countess Maria Kreszentia of Königsegg-Rothenfels (died 1814)
- Issue: Charles Thomas, Prince of Löwenstein-Wertheim-Rosenberg
Names
- German: Dominik Constantin
- House: House of Löwenstein-Wertheim-Rosenberg
- Father: Prince Theodor Alexander of Löwenstein-Wertheim-Rochefort
- Mother: Countess Luise of Leiningen-Dachsburg-Hartenburg

Dominic Constantine, Prince of Löwenstein-Wertheim-Rochefort (in the original German, Dominik Constantin, 16 May 1762 – 18 April 1814) was the fourth and last reigning Prince of the Rochefort line of the House of Löwenstein-Wertheim.

== Early life ==
Dominic Constantine was born in Nancy on 16 May 1762. He was baptized on the same day of his birth in the parish church of San Rocco in Nancy. He was the third child, and first son, of Prince Theodor Alexander of Löwenstein-Wertheim-Rochefort (1722–1780), and Countess Luise of Leiningen-Dachsburg-Hartenburg (1735–1805). Though he was one of six children, only two reached adulthood.

His father was the seventh and youngest son of Dominic Marquard, 3rd Prince of Löwenstein-Wertheim-Rochefort. His mother was a granddaughter of Johann Friedrich, Count of Leiningen-Hartenburg.

== Career ==
He grew up in Strasbourg, where he also attended the military school. In Fulda he began a serious course of study under the supervision of a tutor, and since it was foreseeable that he would be the successor to his uncle Charles Thomas, he settled in Wertheim in 1783.

== Personal life ==
On 5 May 1780 in Nancy, he married Princess Leopoldine of Hohenlohe-Bartenstein (1761–1807). Before her death, they were the parents of seven children:

- Princess Luise Josepha of Löwenstein-Wertheim-Rochefort (1781–1785), who died young.
- Princess Christiane Henriette Polyxena of Löwenstein-Wertheim-Rosenberg (1782–1811), who married Franz, 2nd Prince of Waldburg-Zeil-Trauchburg, in 1805.
- Charles Thomas, 5th Prince of Löwenstein-Wertheim-Rosenberg (1783–1849), who married Countess Sophie of Windisch-Grätz in 1799.
- Princess Josepha Luise of Löwenstein-Wertheim-Rochefort (1784–1789), who died young.
- Prince Constantin Ludwig Carl Franz di Löwenstein-Wertheim-Rosenberg (1786–1844), who married his niece Leopoldine, daughter of his brother Charles Thomas, without issue
- Princess Louise Christiane Charlotte of Löwenstein-Wertheim-Rochefort (1788–1799), who died young.
- Prince Wilhelm Theodor Ludwig Constantin of Löwenstein-Wertheim-Rosenberg (1795–1838), who married, morganatically, Emilie David, in 1833; she was created Baroness von Habitzheim by Louis II, Grand Duke of Hesse in 1838.

After the death of his first wife he married Countess Maria Kreszentia of Königsegg-Rothenfels (1786–1821). Together, they had three more children:

- Prince August Chrisostomus Carl of Löwenstein-Wertheim-Rosenberg (1808–1874), who died unmarried
- Prince Maximilian Franz of Löwenstein-Wertheim-Rosenberg (1810–1884), who died unmarried
- Princess Maria Josefine Sophie of Löwenstein-Wertheim-Rosenberg (1814–1876), who married Prince Franz Joseph of Salm-Salm in 1841. After his death, she married Prince Carl of Solms-Braunfels, a son of Prince Friedrich Wilhelm of Solms-Braunfels and Princess Friederike of Mecklenburg-Strelitz, in 1845.

== Bibliography ==
- Martina Heine: Der letzte Fürst des Alten Reiches. In: Wertheimer Zeitung. vom 16. Mai 2012.
