= Löwenstein =

- Town
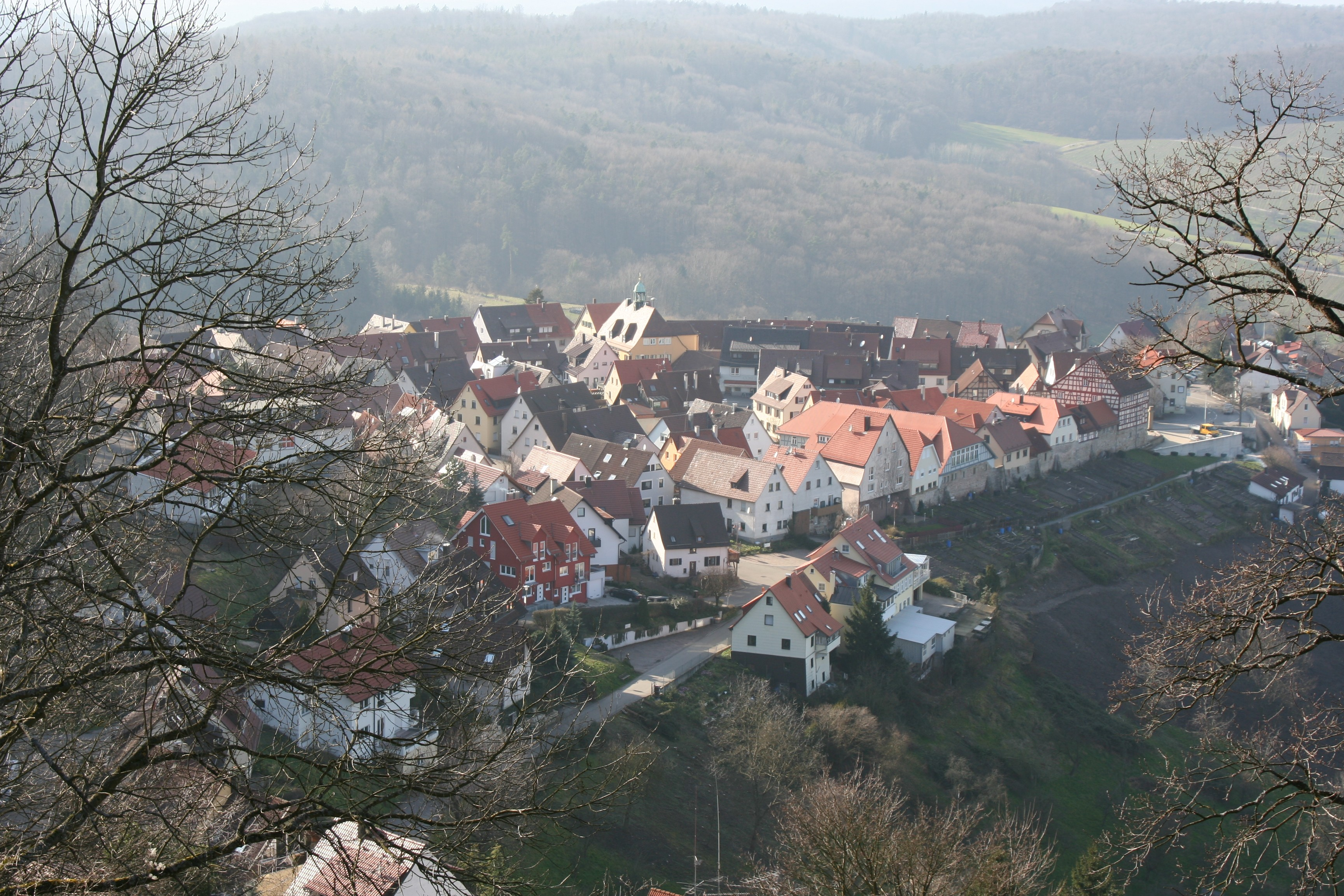
- View from East

- Coat of arms

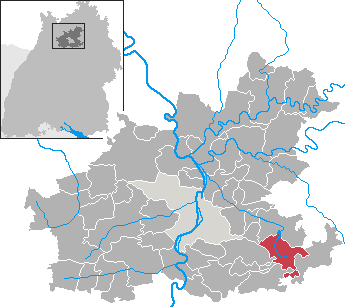
- Location of Löwenstein within Heilbronn district
- Interactive map of Löwenstein
- Location within Germany Location within Baden-Württemberg
- Coordinates: 49°6′N 9°23′E
- Country: Germany
- State: Baden-Württemberg
- Admin. region: Stuttgart
- District: Heilbronn
- Subdivisions: 7

Government
  - Mayor (2024–32): Eberhard Birk

Area
  - Total: 23.46 km^{2} (9.06 sq mi)
- Elevation: 385 m (1,263 ft)

Population (2025-12-31)
  - Total: 3,406
  - Density: 145.2/km^{2} (376.0/sq mi)
- Time zone: UTC+01:00 (CET)
  - Summer (DST): UTC+02:00 (CEST)
- Postal codes: 74245
- Dialling codes: 07130
- Vehicle registration: HN
- Website: www.stadt-loewenstein.de

Löwenstein (German: [ˈløːvn̩ʃtaɪn]) is a town in the district of Heilbronn in Baden-Württemberg, Germany. It was first mentioned in 1123. The castle of Löwenstein served as a residence for the counts of Löwenstein-Wertheim. In 1634 the castle was destroyed by the imperial forces.
