= Dominic Marquard, Prince of Löwenstein-Wertheim-Rochefort =

Dominic Marquard

Prince of Löwenstein-Wertheim-Rochefort
- Period: 26 December 1718 – 11 March 1735
- Predecessor: Maximilian Karl
- Successor: Charles Thomas
- Born: 7 November 1690; Wertheim
- Died: 11 March 1735 (aged 44); Venice
- Spouse: Landgravine Christine of Hesse-Wanfried
- Issue: Charles Thomas, Prince of Löwenstein-Wertheim-Rochefort
Names
- German: Dominik Marquard
- House: House of Löwenstein-Wertheim-Rosenberg
- Father: Maximilian Karl, Prince of Löwenstein-Wertheim-Rochefort
- Mother: Countess Maria Polyxena Khuen von Lichtenberg und Belasi

Dominic Marquard, Prince of Löwenstein-Wertheim-Rochefort (in the original German, Dominik Marquard, 7 November 1690 – 11 March 1735) was the second Prince of Löwenstein-Wertheim-Rochefort.

== Early life and ancestry ==
He was the sixth son and ninth child of Maximilian Karl Albert, last Count and first Prince of Löwenstein-Wertheim-Rochefort (1656 - 1718), and his wife Countess Maria Polyxena Khuen von Lichtenberg und Belasi (1658 - 1712). He was named after Marquard Sebastian von Schenk von Stauffenberg, (1644–1693) Prince-Bishop of Bamberg, who was his godfather.

== Personal life ==
On 28 February 1712, he married Landgravine Christine of Hesse-Wanfried (1688 - 1728) a daughter of Charles, Landgrave of Hesse-Wanfried by his second wife, Countess Juliane Alexandrine of Leiningen-Dagsburg. Since his older brother had already died, unmarried and without children, at that time he was already Hereditary Prince. Dominic Marquard and Christine had thirteen children, nine of whom survived to adulthood:

- Princess Marie Christine (born and died in 1713)
- Prince Charles Thomas (1714 - 1789) married Princess Maria Charlotte von Schleswig-Holstein-Sonderburg-Wiesenburg and had only a daughter Princess Leopoldine of Löwenstein-Wertheim-Rochefort who married her cousin, Charles Albert II, Prince of Hohenlohe-Waldenburg-Schillingsfürst; as widower he married morganatically Maria Josephine von Stipplin
- Prince Johann Philipp Ernst Karl (1715 - 1734) unmarred
- Prince Leopold Constantin (1716 - 1770) unmarried
- Prince Franz Carl Wilhelm Konrad (1717 - 1750) married Baroness Josepha Schirndinger von Schirnding and had one son
- Prince Christian Philipp Josef Alexander (1719 - 1781), married in 1773 Baronesse Franziska d'Humbert without issue
- Prince Johann Joseph Wenzel (1720 - 1788) married Baroness Dorothea von Hausen und Gleichenstorff and had a son
- Princess Sophie Wilhelmine Marie (1721-1749) married Charles Albert I, Prince of Hohenlohe-Waldenburg-Schillingsfürst (1719-1793)
- Prince Theodor Alexander (1722 - 1780) married in 1751 Countess Luise of Leiningen-Dachsburg-Hartenburg, father of Dominic Constantine
- A daughter
- A son
- Princess Maria Leopoldina (1726 - 1759) married Conte Johann Josef Thomas de Joannis Verclos
- A son

== Reign ==
In 1718, he succeeded his father, and acquired various possessions that should influence the history of the House of Löwenstein-Wertheim; in 1720 the Lordship of Haid and its castle in Bohemia, in 1721 the small market town Kleinheubach from the possession of the Counts of Erbach and 1730 the Lordship of Rosenberg in Baden, which derived the Catholic line of the family.

== Death ==
Prince Dominic died in 1735, in Venice, where he had gone to attend the Carnival in disguise, and was buried there, but his heart was moved to the church of Wertheim. His wife Christina died on 17 July 1728, at childbirth, and was buried in the Abbey Engelberg, Grossheubach.

== Sources ==
- Martina Heine: Dominik Marquard heiratete Hessin. In: Wertheimer Zeitung vom 28. Februar 2012

Dominic Marquard, Prince of Löwenstein-Wertheim-Rochefort House of Löwenstein-Wertheim-Rochefort Cadet branch of the House of Löwenstein-Rochefort Born: 7 November 1790 Died: 3 March 1738
German nobility
Preceded by Maximilian Karl Albert	Prince of Löwenstein-Wertheim-Rochefort; 1718–1738	Succeeded by Charles Thomas
