= Löwenstein-Wertheim =

County in the Holy Roman Empire

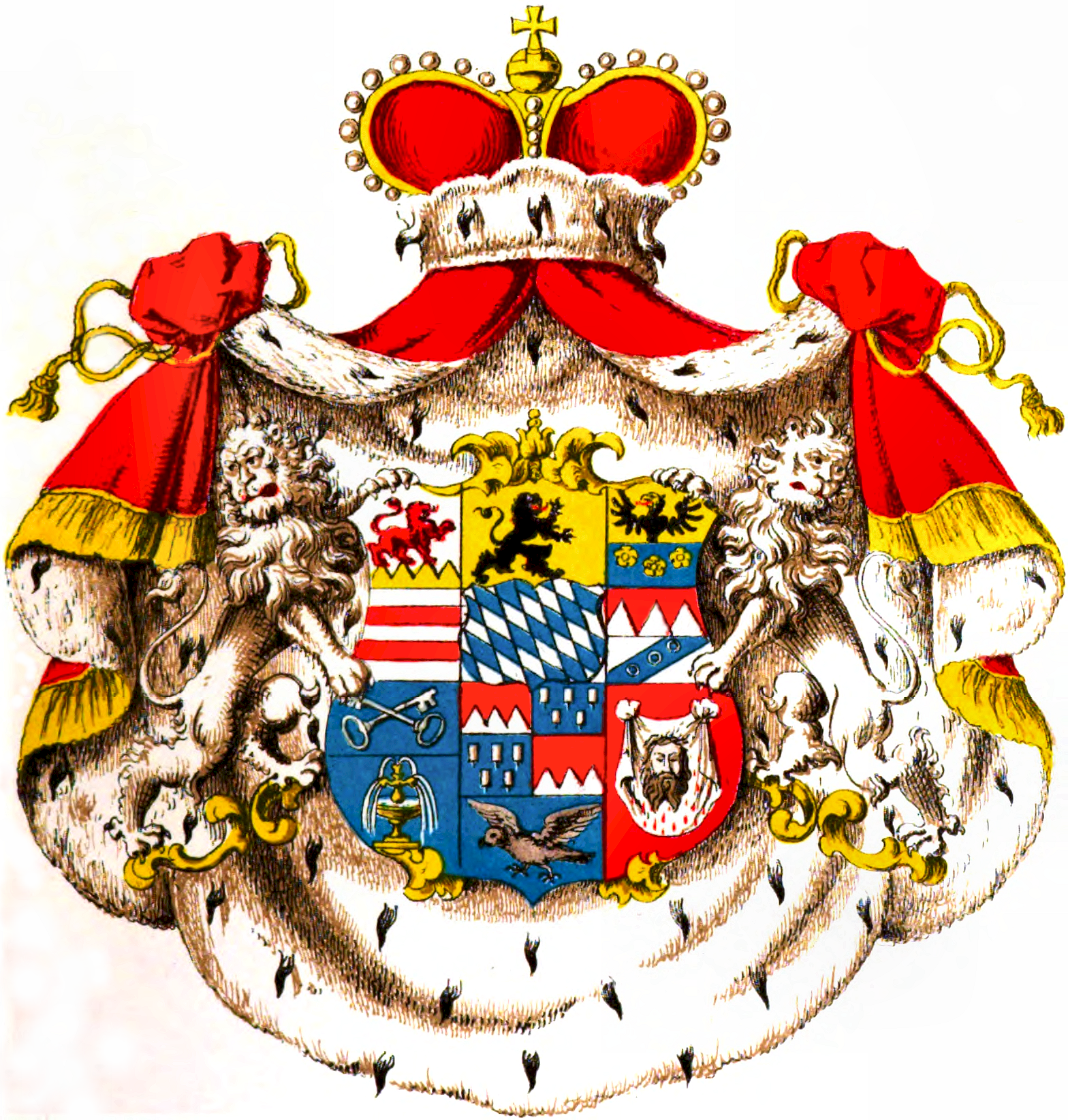
Arms of Löwenstein-Wertheim-Freudenberg

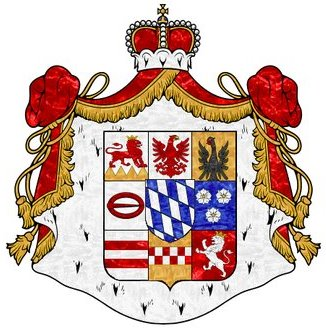
Arms of Löwenstein-Wertheim-Rosenberg

Löwenstein-Wertheim was a county of the Holy Roman Empire, part of the Franconian Circle. It was formed from the counties of Löwenstein (based in the town of Löwenstein) and Wertheim (based in the town of Wertheim am Main) and from 1488 until 1806 ruled by the House of Löwenstein-Wertheim who are morganatic descendants (and the most senior line) of the Palatinate branch of the House of Wittelsbach.

== History ==
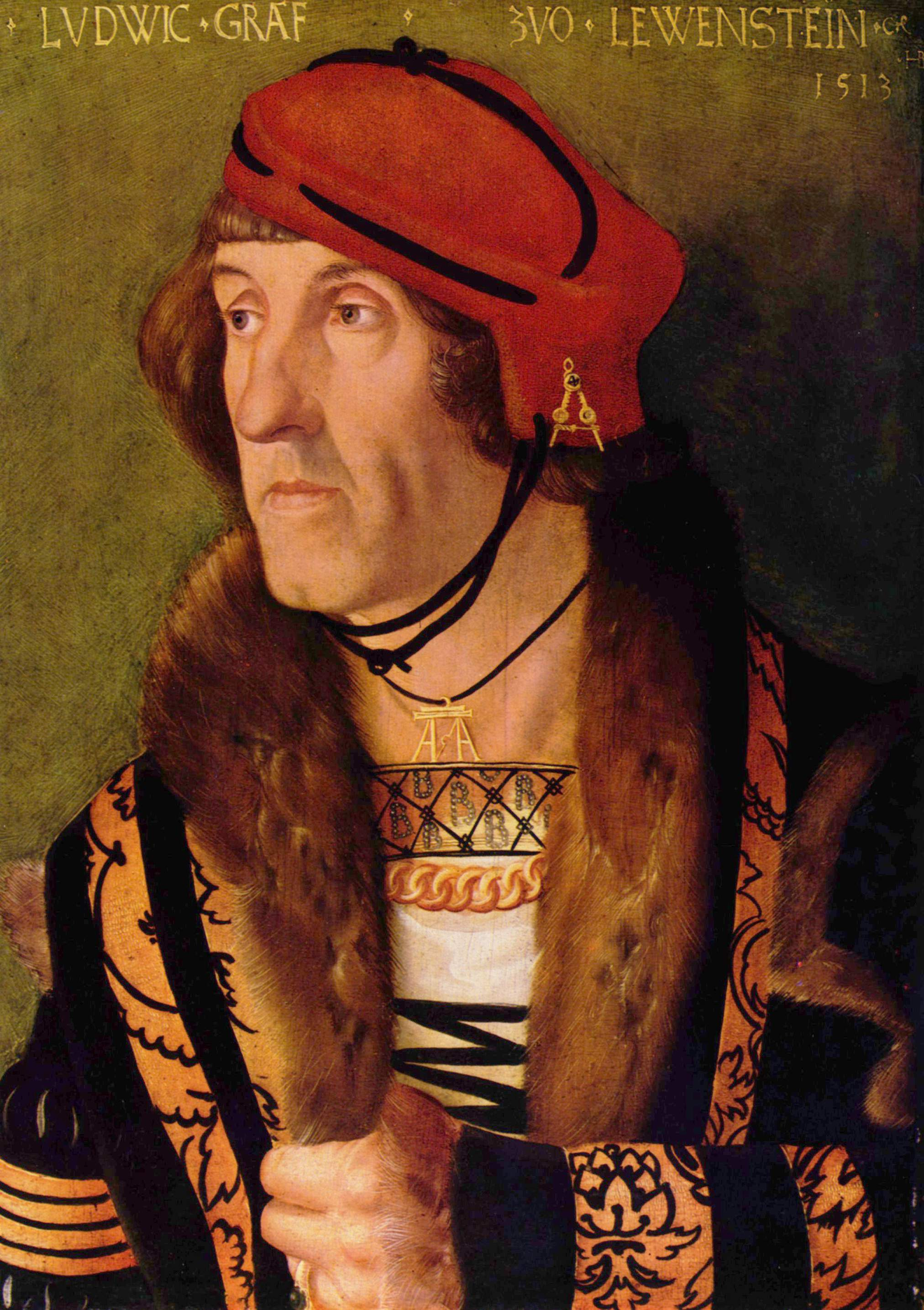
Louis I, Count of Löwenstein (1494–1524), morganatic son of Frederick I, Elector Palatine

The County of Löwenstein belonged to a branch of the family of the counts of Calw before 1281, when it was purchased by the German King Rudolph I of Habsburg, who presented it to his natural son Albert. In 1441 Henry, one of Albert's descendants, sold it to Frederick I, Count Palatine of the Rhine, head of the Palatine branch of the House of Wittelsbach, and later it served as a portion for Louis (1494-1524), a son of the elector by a morganatic marriage, who became a count of the Empire in 1494. Louis obtained Löwenstein in Swabia and received from Maximilian I, Holy Roman Emperor the title of Count of Löwenstein.

The family lost Löwenstein to Ulrich, Duke of Württemberg, but Louis III, Count of Löwenstein, through his marriage to Anna, heiress of the Count of Wertheim, obtained that territory. Louis III left two sons: Christopher Louis, a Lutheran, and John Dietrich, who remained a Catholic, so the family was divided in two: Löwenstein-Wertheim-Freudenberg, a Lutheran branch, and Löwenstein-Wertheim-Rosenberg, a Catholic one. The heads of the two branches, into which the older and Protestant line was afterwards divided, were made princes by the king of Bavaria in 1812 and by the king of Württemberg in 1813; the head of the younger, or Roman Catholic line, was made a prince of the Empire in 1711.

With the dissolution of the Holy Roman Empire in 1806, the county was mediatized and its territory was split among Bavaria, Baden, Württemberg, and Hesse. Under the protocol of Frankfurt on 20 July 1819 all the family lands were mediatised. The area of the County of Löwenstein was about 140 square kilometres (53 sq mi).

The current monarchs of Belgium, Luxembourg, and Liechtenstein, as well as the pretenders to the thrones of Portugal, the Two Sicilies, Bavaria, and Austria-Hungary are descended (not in the male line) from the Rosenberg branch. Rupert zu Löwenstein, the longtime financial manager of the Rolling Stones, was a member of the Freudenberg branch.

== Rulers of Löwenstein ==
House of Löwenstein
- Parent house: Wittelsbach
- Country: Germany
- Founded: 1488
- Founder: Louis I
- Current head: Alois-Konstantin, Prince of Löwenstein-Wertheim-Rosenberg
- Final ruler: Dominic Constantine
- Titles: Count of Löwenstein; Count of Löwenstein-Scharffeneck; Count of Löwenstein-Wertheim; Count of Löwenstein-Wertheim-Virneburg; Count of Löwenstein-Wertheim-Rochefort; Prince of Löwenstein-Wertheim-Rochefort; Prince of Löwenstein-Wertheim-Rosenberg; Prince of Löwenstein-Wertheim-Freudenberg
- Deposition: 1806
- Cadet branches: Löwenstein-Scharffeneck; Löwenstein-Wertheim; Löwenstein-Wertheim-Rosenberg; Löwenstein-Wertheim-Freudenberg

Counts of Löwenstein (1494–1571)

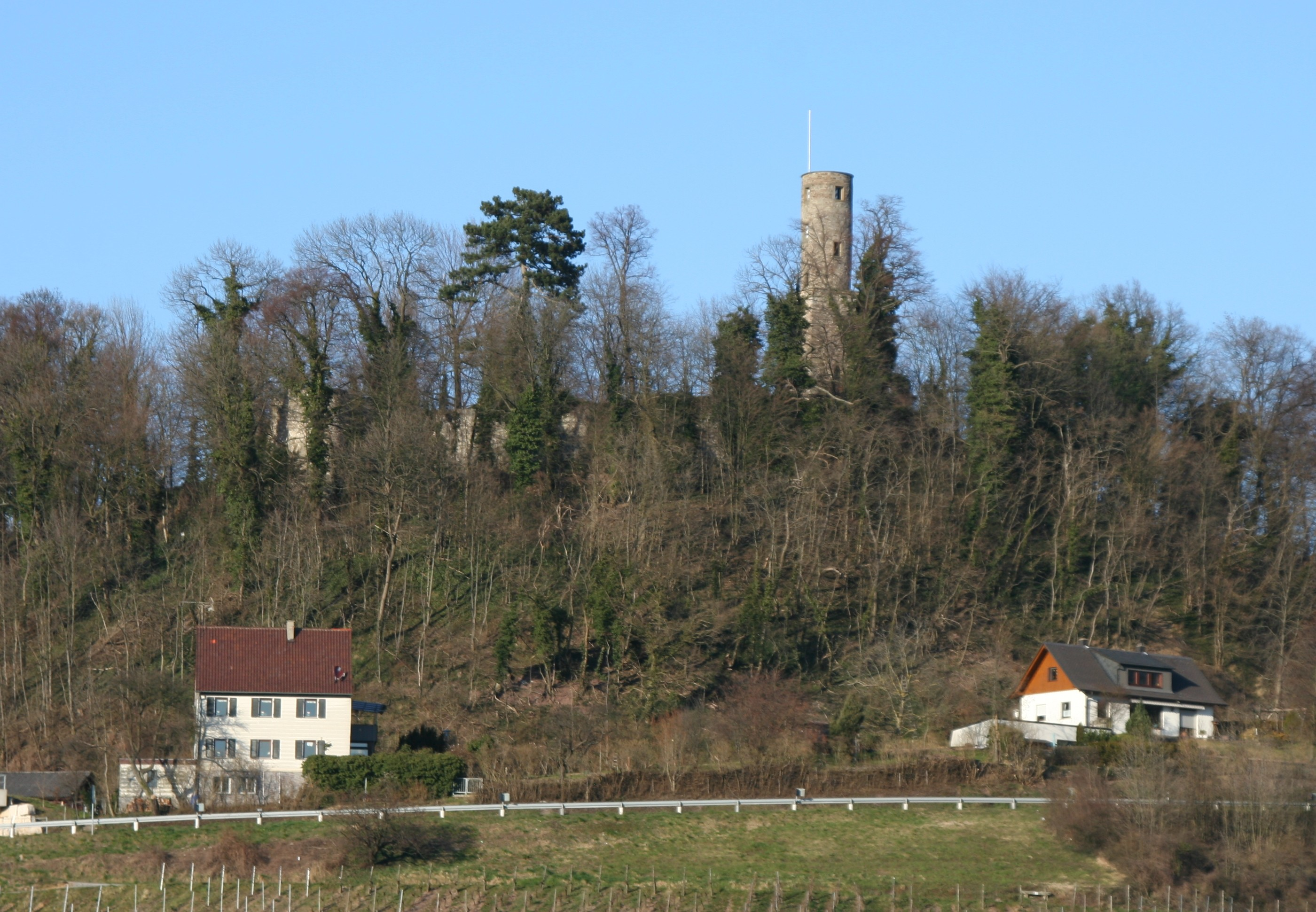
Ruins of Löwenstein Castle

- Ludwig I, Count 1494–1523 (1463-1523), only surviving son of Friedrich I, Elector Palatine by his morganatic marriage
  - Ludwig II, Count 1523–1536 (1498-1536)
  - Friedrich I, Count 1536–1541 (1502-1541)
    - Wolfgang I, Count 1541–1571 (1527-1571), eldest son

=== Counts of Löwenstein-Scharffeneck (1571–1633) ===
- Wolfgang II, Count 1571–1596 (1555-1596), eldest son of Wolfgang I, Count of Löwenstein
  - Georg Ludwig, Count 1596–1633 (1587-1633)

Georg Ludwig survived his only son, with this line becoming extinct. His daughter and heiress Maria Christina of Löwenstein-Scharffeneck (1625–1673) married Gabriel Oxenstierna, Count of Korsholm and Vaasa (1619–1673). The further Counts of Korsholm and Vaasa were their descendants.

=== Counts of Löwenstein-Wertheim (1571–1636) ===
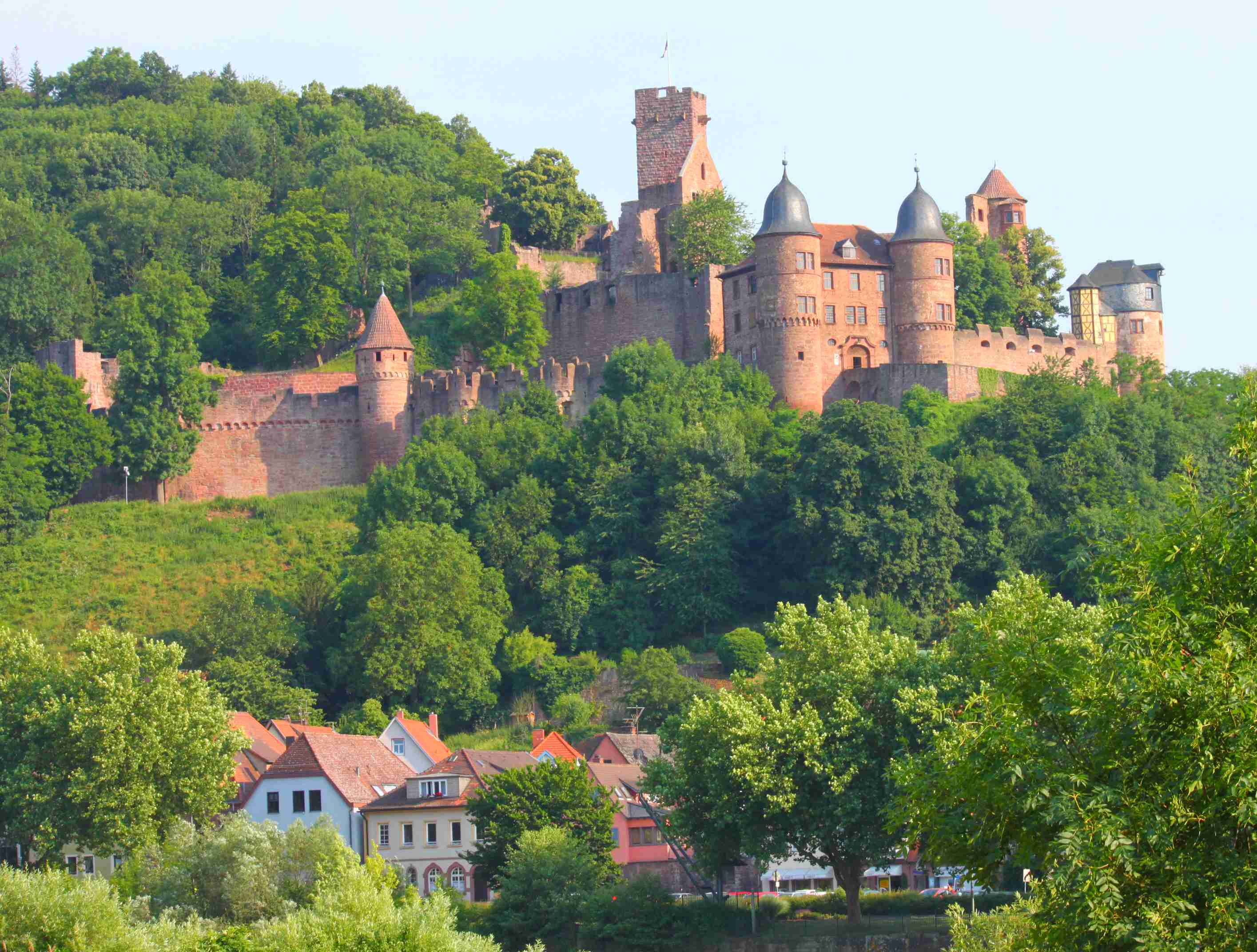
Wertheim am Main Castle

- Ludwig III, Count 1571–1611 (1530-1611), third surviving son of Friedrich I, Count of Löwenstein, married heiress of Wertheim am Main.
  - Ludwig IV, Count 1611–1635 (1569-1635), second son, co-heir with his brothers
  - Wolfgang Ernst, Count 1611–1636 (1578-1636), third son, co-heir with his brothers

Ludwig IV has no known descendants. Wolfgang Ernst only had one daughter, Dorothea Walpurga of Löwenstein-Wertheim (1628–1634) who predeceased him. Their lines were extinct with their own deaths.

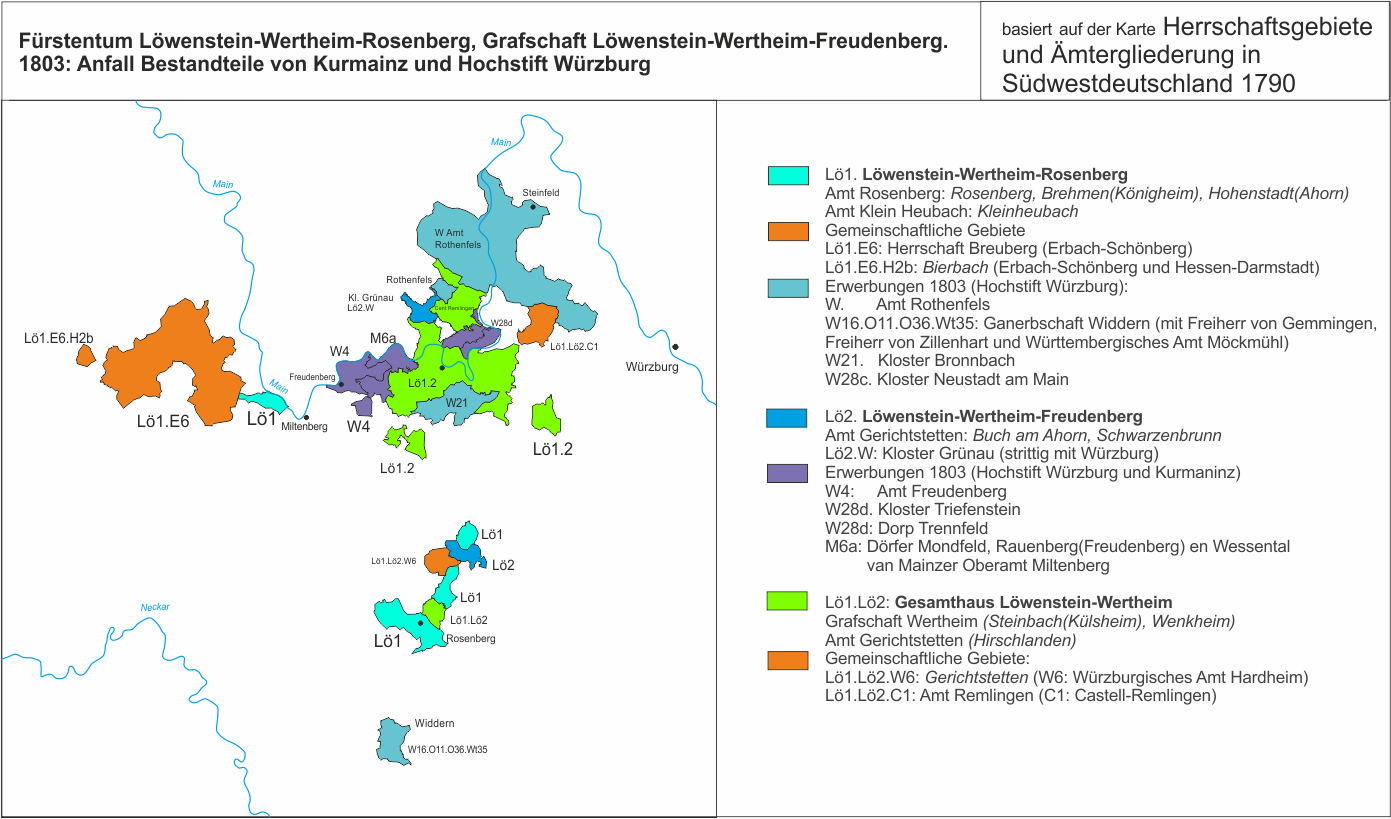
map of the principality of Löwenstein-Wertheim-Rosenberg and the county of Löwenstein-Wertheim-Freudenberg in 1803

=== Counts of Löwenstein-Wertheim-Virneburg (1611–1812) ===
- Christof Ludwig, Count 1611–1618 (1568-1618), eldest son of Ludwig III, Count of Löwenstein-Wertheim, co-heir with his brothers, married the heiress of Virneburg
  - Friedrich Ludwig, Count 1618–1657 (1598-1657)
    - Ludwig Ernst, Count 1657–1681 (1627-1681)
      - Joachim Friedrich, Count 1681–1689 (1666-1689)
      - Eucharius Kasimir, Count 1689–1698 (1668-1698)
    - Count Friedrich Eberhard of Löwenstein-Wertheim-Virneburg (1629-1683) married Otillie, daughter of Otto, Count of Lippe-Brake
      - Heinrich Friedrich, Count 1698–1721 (1682-1721)
        - Johann Ludwig Vollrath, Count 1721–1790 (1705-1790)
          - Johann Karl Ludwig, Count 1790–1812 (1740-1816), raised to Prince of Löwenstein-Wertheim-Freudenberg

=== Counts of Löwenstein-Wertheim-Rochefort (1611–1712) ===
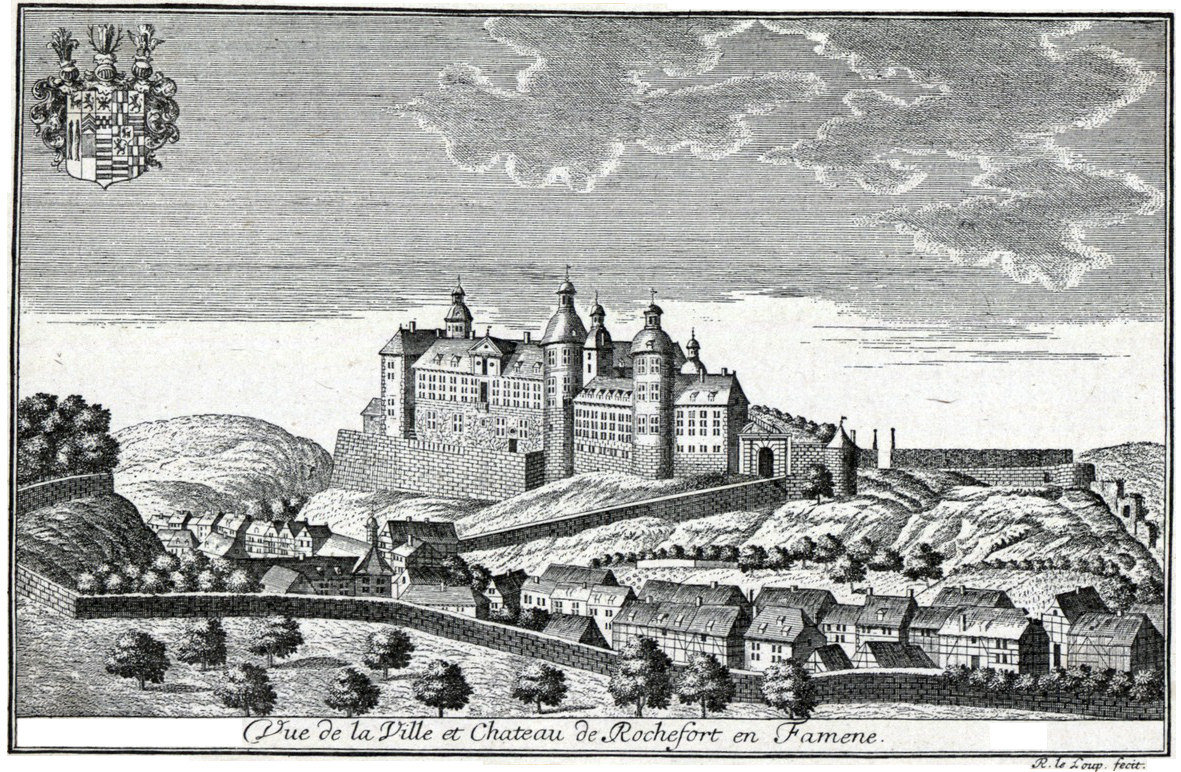
Rochefort, Belgium

- John Dietrich, Count 1611–1644 (1585-1644), fourth son of Ludwig III, Count of Löwenstein-Wertheim, co-heir with his brothers
  - Ferdinand Karl, Count 1644–1672 (1616-1672)
    - Maximilian Karl, Count 1672–1712 (1656-1718), raised to Prince 1712

=== Princes of Löwenstein-Wertheim-Rochefort (1712–1803) ===
- Maximilian Karl, 1st Prince 1712–1718 (1656-1718), the last Count of Löwenstein-Wertheim-Rochefort
  - Dominikus Marquard, 2nd Prince 1718–1735 (1690-1735)
    - Karl Thomas, 3rd Prince 1735–1789 (1714-1789)
    - Prince Theodor Alexander (1722-1780)
      - Dominik Konstantin, 4th Prince 1789–1803 (1762-1814), Princely title changed 1803

=== Princes of Löwenstein-Wertheim-Rosenberg (1803–present) ===
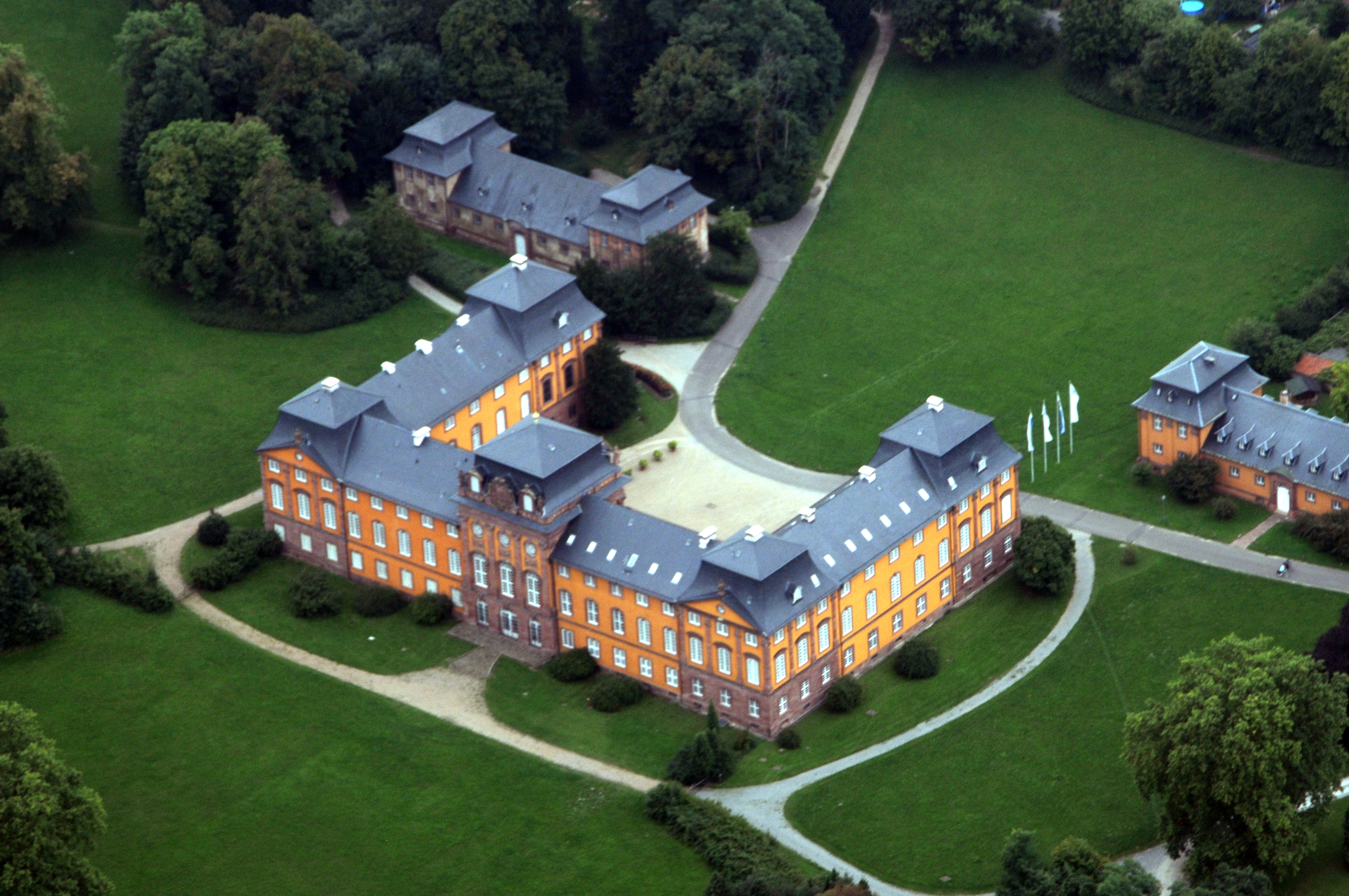
Kleinheubach Palace, residence of the princes of Löwenstein-Wertheim-Rosenberg since 1720

- Dominik Konstantin, 4th Prince of Löwenstein-Wertheim-Rosenberg 1803–1814, previously Prince of Löwenstein-Wertheim-Rochefort
  - Karl Thomas, 5th Prince 1814–1849 (1783-1849)
    - Constantine, Hereditary Prince of Löwenstein-Wertheim-Rosenberg (1802-1838)
      - Karl, 6th Prince 1849–1908, abdicated to take Roman Catholic orders (1834-1921)
        - Aloys, 7th Prince 1908–1952 (1871-1952)
          - Karl, 8th Prince 1952–1990 (1904-1990)
            - Alois-Konstantin, 9th Prince 1990–present (born 1941)
              - Carl Friedrich, Hereditary Prince of Löwenstein-Wertheim-Rosenberg (1966–2010)
                - Nicodemus, Hereditary Prince of Löwenstein-Wertheim-Rosenberg (born 2001)
                - Prince Laurentius (born 2006)
              - Prince Hubertus (born 1968)
              - Prince Dominik (born 1983)
          - Prince Johannes of Löwenstein-Wertheim-Rosenberg (1919–2000)
            - Prince Michael (born 1950)
              - Prince Konstantin (born 1995)
            - Prince Karl (born 1952)
              - Prince Philipp (born 1979)
              - Prince Felix (born 1984)
            - Prince Felix (born 1954)
            - Prince Martin (born 1961)
            - Prince Stephan (born 1968)
              - Prince Nikolaus (born 2004)

=== Princes of Löwenstein-Wertheim-Freudenberg (1812–present) ===
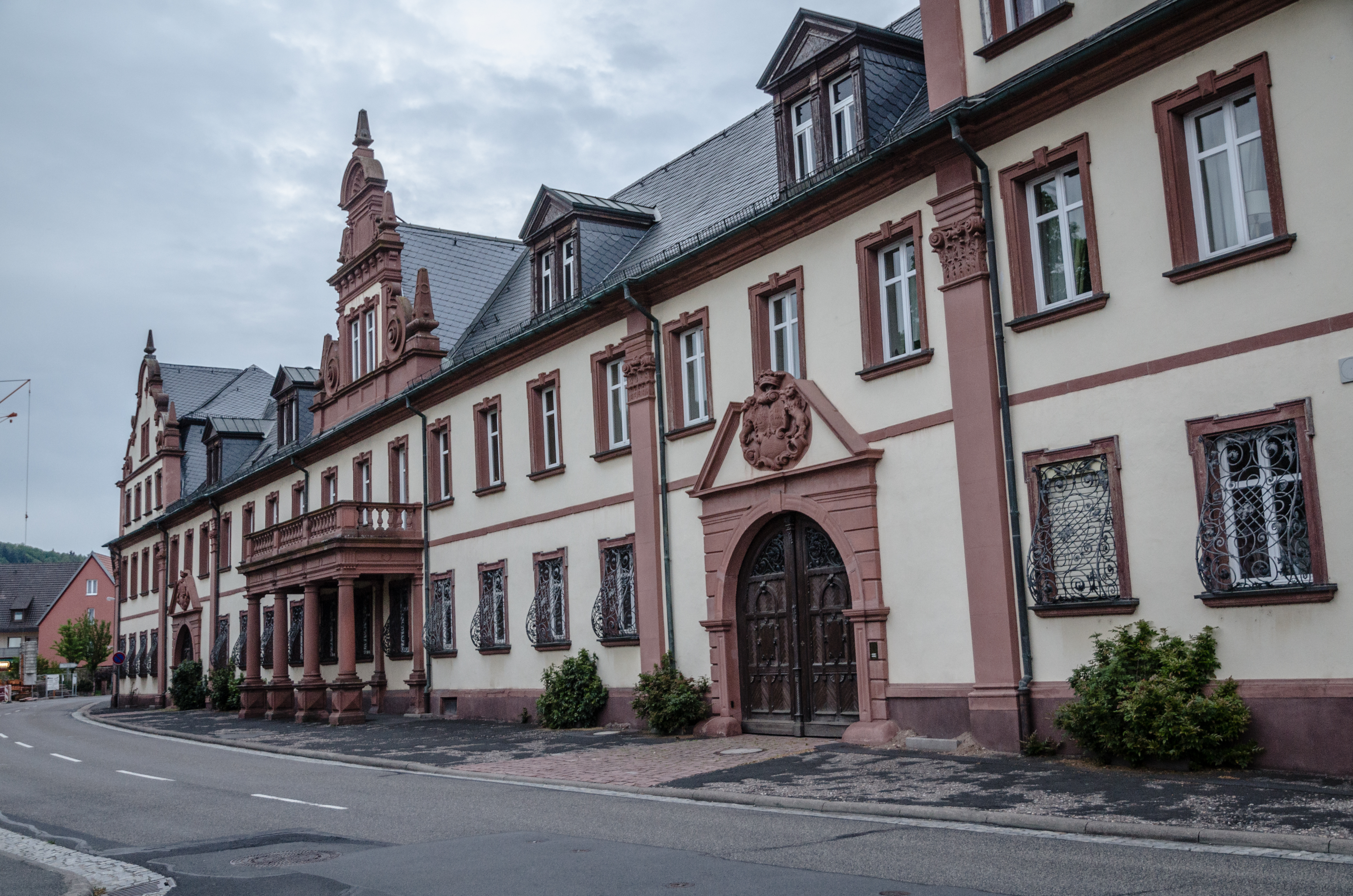
Schloss Kreuzwertheim, residence of the princes of Löwenstein-Wertheim-Freudenberg since 1736

- Johann Karl, 1st Prince 1812–1816 (1740-1816), the last Count of Löwenstein-Wertheim-Virneburg
  - Georg Wilhelm Ludwig, 2nd Prince 1816–1855 (1775-1855)
    - Adolf, 3rd Prince 1855–1861 (1805-1861)
  - Prince Wilhelm Ernst (1783-1847)
    - Wilhelm, 4th Prince 1861–1887 (1817-1887)
      - Ernst Alban Ludwig, 5th Prince 1887–1931 (1854-1931), abdicated 1918
      - Prince Alfred (1855-1925)
        - Udo, 6th Prince 1931–1980 (1896-1980)
          - Alfred-Ernst, 7th Prince 1980–2010 (1924-2010)
            - Ludwig, 8th Prince 2010–present (born 1951)
              - Ludwig, Hereditary Prince of Löwenstein-Wertheim-Freudenberg (born 1994)
            - Prince Udo (born 1957)
              - Prince Georg (born 1993)
              - Prince Philipp (born 1998)
      - Prince Wilhelm Gustav Ludwig (1863-1915)
        - Prince Wolfgang Wilhelm Gustav Karl Ludwig (1890-1945)
          - Prince Wolfram Hubertus Wilhelm Heinrich (born 1941)
            - Prince Wolfram Michael Nikolaus Friedrich Jakob (born 1980)
      - Prince Ludwig Karl (1864-1899)

== See also ==
- Hubertus, Prince of Löwenstein-Wertheim-Freudenberg (1906–1984), German historian and political figure
