= Maximilian Karl, Prince of Löwenstein-Wertheim-Rochefort =

Maximilian Karl
- Count and then Prince of Löwenstein-Wertheim-Rochefort
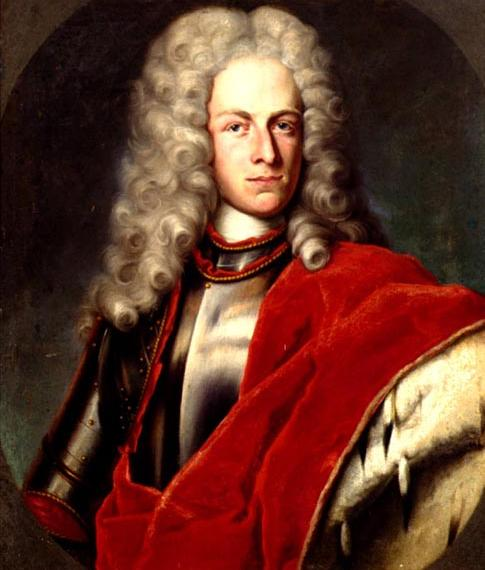

Prince of Löwenstein-Wertheim-Rochefort
- Period: 1672–1718
- Born: 14 July 1656; Rochefort
- Died: 26 December 1718 (aged 62); Milan
- Spouse: Countess Maria Polyxena Khuen of Lichtenberg and Belasi
- Issue: Eleonore, Landgravine of Hesse-Rotenburg; Dominic Marquard, Prince of Löwenstein-Wertheim-Rochefort
- House: House of Löwenstein-Wertheim
- Father: Ferdinand Karl, Count of Löwenstein-Wertheim-Rochefort
- Mother: Countess Anna Maria of Fürstenberg

Maximilian Karl Albert, Prince of Löwenstein-Wertheim-Rochefort (in the original German, Maximilian Karl Albrecht, 14 July 1656 – 26 December 1718) was a military officer in the service of the Holy Roman Empire and the first Prince of Löwenstein-Wertheim-Rochefort.

== Early life ==
Maximilian Karl Albert was the fourth child and the first son of Ferdinand Karl, Count of Löwenstein-Wertheim-Rochefort (1616-1672) and his wife, Landgravine Anna Maria of Fürstenberg-Heiligenberg (1634-1705), daughter of Landgrave Egon VIII of Fürstenberg-Heiligenberg and Countess Anna Maria of Hohenzollern-Hechingen (1605–1652). He was followed by ten siblings.

== Biography ==
Maximilian Karl, entered the emperor's service at an early age, was an acting imperial advisor since 1684 and was named privy councilor of the empire in 1699. After Prince Elector Max Emanuel of Bavaria was forced into exile in 1704, Maximilian Karl became the imperial administrator of Bavaria and, in his new rank as a prince, assumed the honorable position of a principle commissioner, the permanent representative of the emperor in the imperial diet from 1712 on.

On 3 April 1711 he was elevated to the status of a prince by Emperor Joseph I. He was granted princely rank for all his legitimate descendants by the emperor's brother and successor, Emperor Karl VI, on 8 January 1712.

His last office in the imperial service, which he held from 1717 until his death, was the governorship of the Duchy of Milan, which Prince Eugene of Savoy had conquered for the House of Habsburg.

Maximilian Karl died and was buried in Milan; his heart was transferred and buried in the crypt of the collegiate church of Wertheim.

== Marriage and issue ==
On 26 August 1678, Maximilian Karl married the Countess Maria Polyxena Khuen von Belasi (1658-1712), daughter of Count Mathias Khuen von Belasi (d. 1678) and his wife, Countess Anna Susanna Apollonia von Meggau (1617-1689). The marriage produced ten children:

- Princess Maria Theresia Franziska zu Löwenstein-Wertheim-Rochefort (1679 - 1718)
- Wilhelm Karl Magnus Anton, Erbgraf zu Löwenstein-Wertheim-Rochefort (born and died in 1680)
- Maximilian Karl Anton, Erbgraf zu Löwenstein-Wertheim-Rochefort (1681 - 1710)
- Count Wolfgang Philipp Eberhard Joseph zu Löwenstein-Wertheim-Rochefort (born and died in 1683)
- Count Felix Albert zu Löwenstein-Wertheim-Rochefort (1684 - 1685)
- Princess Eleonore Maria Anna zu Löwenstein-Wertheim-Rochefort (1686 - 1753) married in Frankfurt on 9 November 1704 Ernest Leopold, Landgrave of Hesse-Rotenburg and had issue
- Count Franz Joseph zu Löwenstein-Wertheim-Rochefort (1687 - 1688)
- Princess Maria Leopoldine Theresia Renata Dorothea zu Löwenstein-Wertheim-Rochefort (1689 - 1763) married in Alt-Otting on 1 September 1710 Conrad Sigismund, Count von Starhemberg (1689-1727) and had issue
- Dominik Marquard Sebastian Christian Ernst, 2.Fürst zu Löwenstein-Wertheim-Rochefort (1690 - 1735) married Landgravine Christine of Hesse-Wanfried (1688 - 1728) a daughter of Charles, Landgrave of Hesse-Wanfried and had issue
- Count Franz Carl zu Löwenstein-Wertheim-Rochefort (1693 - 1697)

== Notes ==
Maximilian Karl, Prince of Löwenstein-Wertheim-Rochefort House of Löwenstein-Wertheim-Rochefort Cadet branch of the House of Löwenstein-Rochefort Born: 14 July 1756 Died: 26 December 1718
German nobility
Preceded by Ferdinand Karl	Count of Löwenstein-Wertheim-Rochefort; 1672–1718	Succeeded by Dominik Marquard as Prince of Löwenstein-Wertheim-Rochefort
