= Khuen von Belasi =

Austrian noble family

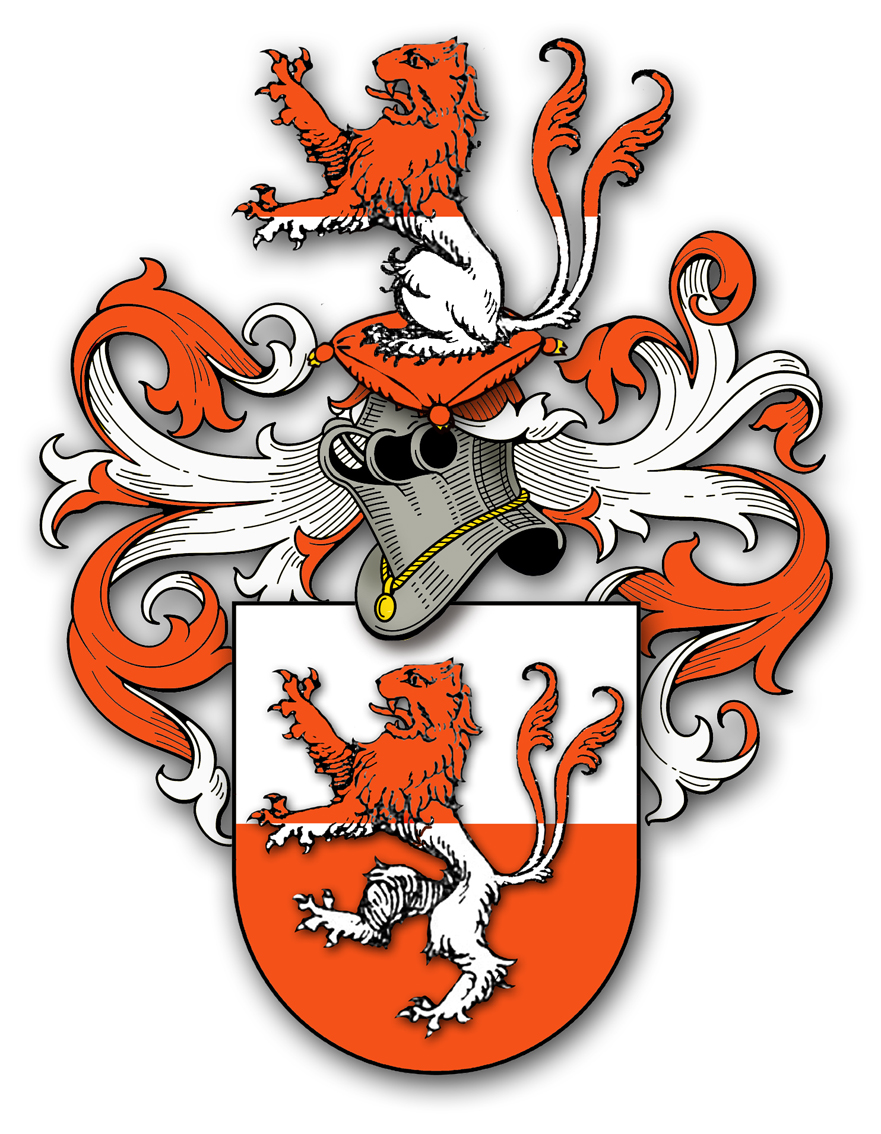
Coat of arms of the Khuen von Belasi family

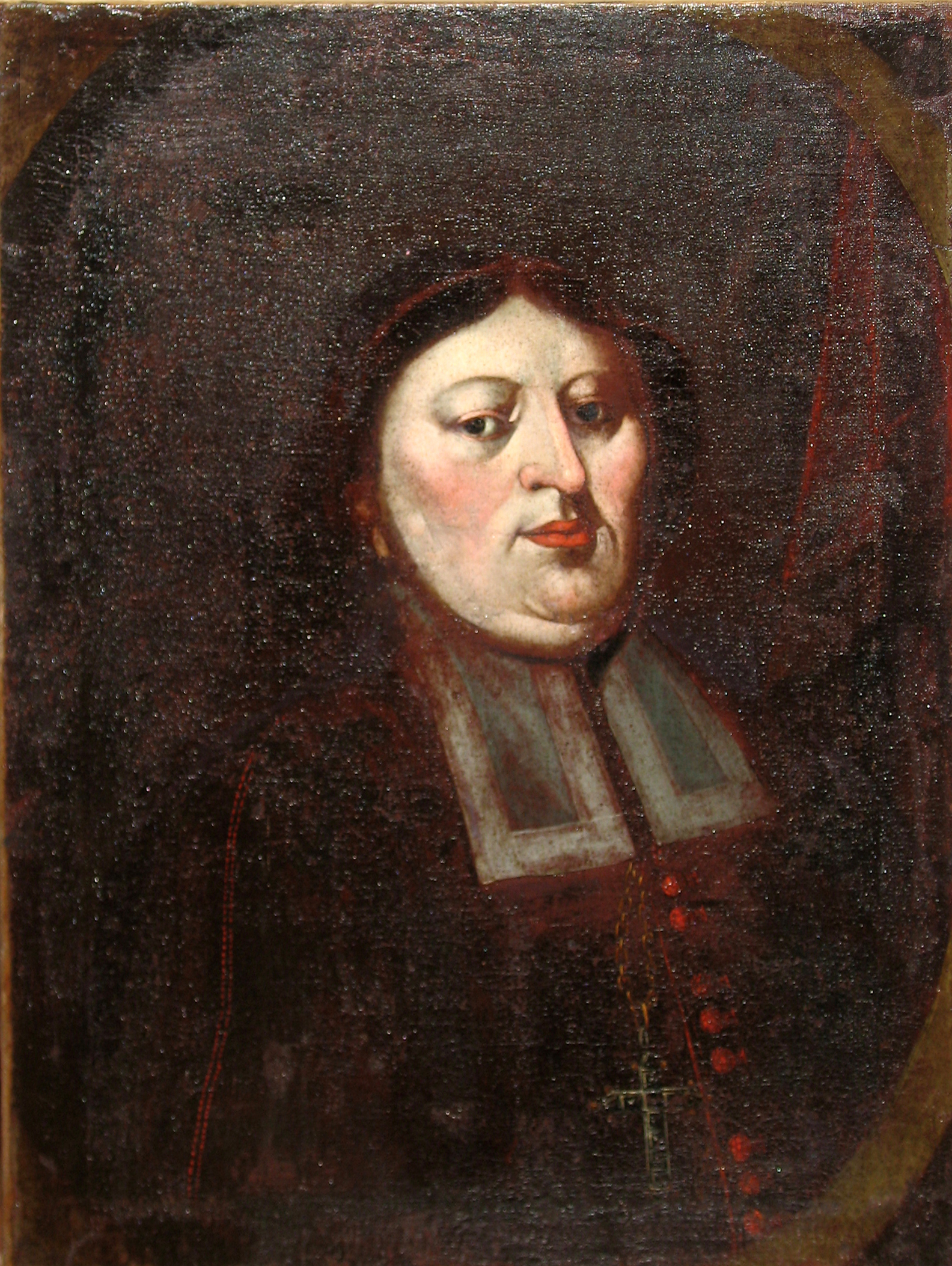
Bishop Johann Franz Khuen von Belasi

The House of Khuen von Belasi (older spelling: Khuen von Belasy) is an Austrian aristocratic family originating from the County of Tyrol, first documented in 1111. Over time, the family established itself in Lower Austria and Bohemia, branching into several lines. In 1630, they were elevated to the rank of Counts. The family remains present in South Tyrol and in Austria to this day.

== History ==
The family was first documented on July 13 and 14, 1111, in Bolzano, when Egeno and Otto in der Grube von Tramin were mentioned. The verified lineage of the Khuen family (also spelled Khuon, Khun, and others) begins with Egeno in the Grube of Tramin, who is recorded in sources between 1209 and 1229. The family first appeared as a knightly lineage in 1311, when they served in the martial duties of the village community of Tramin.

Egeno’s great-grandson, Dominus Chuonradus of Tramin, documented between 1342 and 1372, bore the epithet "Chuon" (the Bold). This name later evolved into "Khuen," which was adopted by his descendants. Around 1380, Arnold, a son of Cuanus of Tramin, acquired Belasi Castle in the Non Valley of Trentino. The acquisition occurred through his marriage to Elisabeth von Belasi, the last member of that noble lineage.

In 1422, Hans Jakob, governor of the Etsch region, married Margarethe von Niederthor, an heiress from a Bolzano noble family that resided, among other places, at Neuhaus Castle. This union significantly expanded the Khuen family's estates. Their coat of arms, a standing lion, was combined with that of the Niederthor family—a tower with an open gate.

The Khuen family gained greater prominence in the 16th century: Pankraz Khuen became an advisor to the future Emperor Maximilian I in 1496 and was granted the fiefdom of Lichtenberg Castle in Vinschgau by him in 1513. The castle remains in their possession to this day.

In 1541, Blasius Khuen was appointed as a councilor of the Lower Austrian regiment, later serving as an imperial privy councilor. From 1560 to around 1568, he held the position of Chamber President for Upper Austria in Tyrol. In 1573, Rudolf Khuen was granted the title "Khuen von Belasy von Gandeck, also Liechtenberg and Aur, Baron of Neu-Lempach," formally elevating the family to the rank of barons. By 1537, he had acquired the lordship of Gandegg in Eppan, where he constructed the present-day Gandegg Castle in 1550. In 1565, he purchased the lordship and castle of Neulengbach in Lower Austria, which remained in the family's possession until 1646. In 1571, the Ansitz Thurn in Bolzano also came into the hands of the Khuen family, remaining under their ownership until 1637.

In 1621, the family acquired Englar Castle, located above Gandegg, which they had already leased since 1530. The castle remains in the family's possession to this day, as do the Kallmünz residence in Merano and the Festenstein castle ruins.

In 1619, Johann Eusebius was elevated to the rank of Imperial Count. His male line ended, as his sole descendant, Maria Franziska, married Count Paul Pálffy von Erdöd. On October 30, 1630, Emperor Ferdinand II elevated the entire family to the rank of Counts. On July 27, 1640, Eusebius' nephews Matthias, Karl Balthasar, and Leopold were also granted the title of Imperial Count.

=== Family Lines ===
The family established itself in Bohemia in 1378, when Emperor Charles IV pledged a portion of the South Bohemian Frauenberg estate, including the town of Lišov, Oselno, and other surrounding villages, to Johann Khuen. Later, the family also settled in South Moravia, acquiring Svídnice in 1621 and Týnec in 1633. Through various branches, the Khuen family spread across the Habsburg Monarchy: the Khuen-Lützow in Moravia, the Khuen-Nuštar in Slavonia/Croatia, and the Khuen-Héderváry in Hungary (from 1873 onward as heirs of the Viczay-Héderváry family).

In 1880, the family came into possession of the Grusbach estate and castle in South Moravia through marriage. Both Hédervár and Grusbach remained in their ownership until they were confiscated in 1945. In the Salzburg region, the family also temporarily held extensive properties, thanks to Archbishop Johann Jakob Khuen von Belasi and his brother. Between 1568 and 1626, they owned Gartenau castle; Weißpriach castle belonged to them from 1587 to 1717, and Kammer Castle from 1610 to 1722.

== Notable members of the Barons of Khuen von Belasi before 1622 ==
- Rudolf Khuen von Belasi († 1581 Vienna, since 1559 Prosector of Ferdinand I of Austria, later Geheimrat of Maximilian II. of Austria and Rudolf II. Titled to a Freiherr May, 8th of 1573
- His son Johann Eusebius Freiherr Khuen von Belasi († 6. November 1622)
- Johann Jakob Khuen von Belasi, * about 1515; † 15. Mai 1586) Archbishop of Salzburg

== Notable members of the Counts of Khuen von Belasi since 1622 ==
- Jakob Freiherr Khuen von Belasi zu Lichtenberg and Gandeck (†21. September 1639) nobled to Reichsgraf in 1640
- Johann Franz Reichsgraf Khuen von Belasi (12. August 1649; †3. April 1702 Brixen), Prince-Bishop of Brixen

For the Val di Non, the best known personage was ‘dominus’ Pancrazio Khuen-Belasi (Pankraz Khuen von Belasi) for being captain of Tenno and vicar general of the Valli di Non and Valli di Sole at the turn of the 15th-16th century. In 1496, with the title of baron, he became councillor to Emperor Maximilian, and in 1503 he was invested by the emperor with the Lichtenberg castle in the upper Vinschgau, in the district of Glorenza, curator of Naudersberg (over the Resia pass). Consequently, the predicate ‘zu Lichtenberg’ was added to the family surname. Another very important member in the history of the Tyrol is Blasius KhuenBelasi, who moved from the Tyrol to Austria. Blasius, born around 1525, son of the Chancellor of Tyrol Matthias von Khuen and Susanna née Firmian, was an administrator of King Ferdinand I, from 13 June 1541 an advisor to the government of Lower Austria until October 1647. From then on he became a special councillor and in the years from 1560 until about 1568 president of the Tyrolean Chamber in Upper Austria; then court chamberlain to Emperor Leopold I and designated chamberlain and guardian for Philippine Welser's children. In 1555 he married Regina von Lamberg; and around the year 1557 he acquired the castle and lordship of Gandegg. On 21 July 1573, he received the title of Baron of the Empire. He was one of the most influential men of the title under Archduke Ferdinand II and died on 20 July 1578 in St Paul's near Eppan. The southern wall of the chapel of the St. Paul's cemetery is covered with sixteen tombstones of Khuen ancestors, men and women from the year 1593, as a mural.

Johann Jakob, born in 1520, son of Jakob, was canon of Brixen, became a member of the Salzburg cathedral chapter and was finally elected Archbishop of Salzburg on 28 November 1560 and died there on 11 May 1586. He was considered a man of unconditional devotion, religious zeal, personal integrity and impeccable living. This election ushered in an almost two-century-long era of the dominance of South Tyrolean nobility in the Salzburg cathedral chapter. (Khuen of Belasy, Welsperg-Raitenau, Selva, Lichtenstein, Lodron, Spaur, Thun-Hohenstein, Firmian and others). Pangraz II Khuen von Belasy (1548 - 1586), was the son of Georg Khuen von Belasi and Barbara Künigl. He held important positions including captain of Trento. He was an imperial councillor and sent on various assignments. Rudolph Khuen von Belasy and Lichtenberg, Baron in Neuen Lenbach (Lengbach), eldest son of Jakob Khuen senior and Magdalenen Fuchs von Fuchsberg, in 1559 was already an escort of Ferdinand I, then chamberlain, private councillor to Emperors Maximilian II and Rudolph II, colonel of the stables. He was ambassador to the court of France. With two diplomas from Emperor Maximilian II dated 8 May 1573, he and his brothers and relatives, Johann, Jacob, Blaise, Caspar etc., together with all their descendants, were elevated to the noble rank of barons and on 21 June 1573 baron of Lenbach. He bought the fort and lordship of Neuen Lenbach together with the markets and all the assets from Christoph Tannhausen first as administration and pledge for about 15,000 guilders with a letter of pledge dated Pressburg 12 July 1567. Emperor Rudolf II on 15 May left him with the fief, taxes from urbars, forests, and other property as free hereditary property for about 24480 florins and then on 15 October 1577 in Vienna confirmed it to him (K. K. Hofkammer-Archiv). Already earlier, in 1754, he had bought the castle and estate of Erla in Lower Austria from Marx von Gienger. In 1573, he was bound to the lordship as a member of the territory in Lower Austria. He had a house built in Vienna on the corner of Dorotheergasse, opposite the Augustinian Church: he partly bought Count Eko Salm's house together with the garden at two burgher houses and renovated them into one large house (today's Palffysches House. He had as his wife Maria Magdalena Baroness von Palffy, daughter of Peter Palffy Baron and Sophia Baroness von Dersffy, who was widowed and still living in 1590. Rudolf died in Vienna on 29 June 1581 and was buried in the collegiate church of St Dorothea's Convent where he had prepared the grave for himself and his descendants. The inscription on the tomb is: Here lies buried the noble Lord Rudolph Khuen von Belasy and Litchtenberg and Gandegg, Baron of Neu Lengbach, who during his life was administrator, treasurer and colonel of the stables of Maximilian II, and lately private councillor to his majesty Emperor Rudolf II, here on 9 June 1581 he fell asleep in God's good grace. Johann Eusebius Khuen von Belasy in Lichtenberg and Gandegg, baron of Neuen Lenbach, lord in Paumgarten, Rainpollenbach, Waasen und Judeman, knight of the Spanish Order of St James, was imperial treasurer and chief official. In 1596, he was a stable councillor in Bohemia, court councillor for war, private councillor and general commissioner for war in Bohemia, and from 1605 to 1610 inspector for the title of Freiherren of Lower Austria. He was solemnly married, letter of invitation dated 26 October 1595, to Maria Baroness von Berkha, posthumous daughter of Zdenko Lord of Berkha Baron of Duba and Leippa, formerly imperial secret councillor and chief chamberlain of the Bohemian crown, and Veronika Poplin Lady von Lobkowiz, and was married to her the following Sunday, 12 November 1595 in Vienna. On 12 May 1612 R. Mathias appointed him secret councillor, as well as commander of the Comorn Fortress; in 1613 he went with others to the Ottoman Porte in Constantinople as ambassador: immediately after the start of the Bohemian War in 1620 he was general commissar of the war of the Imperial Armies in Bohemia. He drew up his will on 22 April 1622 and ordered in it, among other things, the foundation of a Franciscan monastery in Neu-Lengbach and left his domains and property in Neu-Lenbach, Paumgarten etc. in common to his widow and his only daughter Maria Franziska. He died in Swietla in Bohemia on 6 November 1622 in his 48th year, but his body was taken to Vienna and buried in the family tomb in St Dorothea Church Vienna. His widow Baroness Maria Berkha had the Franciscan monastery built and, according to the letter of 18 April 1623, confirmed the foundation of the Franciscan monastery in Langenbach. She and her daughter were still in possession of Neuenlenbach, Paumgarten, Waasen etc. in 1636. Her only daughter and heiress, Baroness Maria Franziska married Count Paul Palffy Erdöd, heir to the estates in Bibersburg, Stamfen and Marchegg, imperial privy councillor, judex curiae and in 1649 Palatinus of the Kingdom of Hungary, and in a will of 1656 bequeathed her possessions in Neuenlenbach to her son Count Johann Karl von Pailfy. Ratupoltenbach, Besten Leitten etc., together with the Khuen house in Vienna on the corner of Dorothea Alley. With her, the branch of the noble Khuen family in Austria became extinct. Another important member of the family is Hans Jacob (Johann Jakob III) Khuen von Belasi and Naudersberg Baron in Lichtenberg und Gandegg, etc. (1545–1608). He was chamberlain to Archduke Ferdinand in Tyrol, governor of the Etsch district, Burgrave in Meran. Already in 1579 he was married to Margaretha von Niederthor, daughter and heiress of George Niederthor zu Neuhaus, who died in 1556 as the last man of this noble Niederthor family, and Katharina Tänzl von Trazberg, who was a very rich lady in the Tyrol in her time. She brought him as a dowry her father's domains and the fort of Neuhauß near Terlan in Tirol, as well as other small businesses and more than 30,000 gulden of gold in cash, and most of her possessions. Margaretha bequeathed her property to her children together with the Niederthor family coat of arms. She became the mother of 18 children, 13 boys and 5 girls. Hans Jakob was commander of Castle Tyrol from 1592 to 1605, governor of the Etsch and died on 26 March 1608. Margaretha followed him to the grave 12 August 1610 in Lichtenberg. She was thus the wealthy heiress of the powerful family, characterised by the coat of arms of a tower with an open gateway, and she carried the tower coat of arms in addition to that of the lion. The Khuen Belasi coat of arms thus became a quartered shield with a standing lion and a tower with an open gate. Then Jakob Freiherr Khuen von Belasy zu Liechtenberg und Gandegg, son of Johann Jakobs und Margaretha von Niederthor, lord of Liechtenberg, Gandegg, Teutschen, Offen, Eläß, Paumgarten, as well as Landstein in Bohemia, was at first advisor to the regiment in Innsbruck, then special chamberlain to Emperor Matthias and Ferdinand II, also advisor to the royal stable in Bohemia, finally secret advisor and ambassador to the court of Chur in Bavaria. He bought substantial estates in Landstein in Bohemia from the imperial chamber in 1623 and in 1636 in Lower Austria in Paumgarten issued to him by Franziska Gräfin von Palffy born Baroness von Khuen. He married Siguna Margaretha von Annenberg, daughter of Mathias and Maximiliana Lamberg, court maid to Empress Anne, wife of Emperor Matthias. With her he contracted marriage in the Annenberg village of Lätsch in the Tyrol on 31 August 1614, where Jakob Andreas Freiherr von Brandis, representative of both imperial majesties, brought the wedding gift. He was governor of the Etsch, etc. He had three sons and two daughters with Eleonora, died on 22 September 1639, and was buried in Neuen Lenbach in the Franciscan church. The daughters are Anna Maria and Katherina. Their sons are Mathias, Karl Balthasar and Leopold Khuen von Belasy Freiherren, who together with their father Jakob von Khuen and descendants were raised to the status of counts by Emperor Ferdinand III on 27 July 1640. The youngest of them Count Leopold Khuen von Belasi and Lichtenberg was canon in Passau and Brixen, and later in 1679 Dean and eventually provost in Passau. Edmund Leonhard Khuen von Belasi (1698 - 1777) from 1728 was canon of Brixen and from 1729, parish priest of St. Paul, then from 5 February 1747 generous provost of Bozen, called ‘the pious provost’, and died on 28 November 1777 in Bozen. Many males of this family served in the imperial army with high ranks. Johann Ernst (also: Josef Ernst) Warmund Graf Khuen von Belasy (died 26 August 1709) was from 1702 to 1709 commander of the Knights of St. Rupert. He fell in a battle fought on the Rhine between imperial and French troops during the War of Succession. Count Joseph Anton Johann Nepomuk Khuen von Belasi zu Lichtenberg und Gandegg, Herr zu Nemilkan, Chamutiz und Lautschowa in Bohemia, the eldest son of Joseph Karl Ferdinand Imperial Bavarian Chamberlain in Chur - Pfalz, was in the Bavarian war services, became a lieutenant major, colonel and eventually a battlefield instructor; in 1789 he fell in the Turkish wars at Sabacs. Joseph Edmund Johann Adam Alois Kajetan Leopold Khuen von Belasi At the time of the Napoleonic Wars, Count Joseph Khuen von Belasi took part in them from the year 1796 to 1809. Born on 6 August 1766 in Innsbruck, he was the son of Franz Josef, a councillor for land rights. He did his military service from 1784; he took part in the assault against the Turks in Dubica near Agram (Zagreb) on 25. 4. 1788, but then devoted himself to academic studies. As a captain of the Schützen he fought at Faedo (Lavis), and was taken prisoner, despite his steadfastness and courage, but released after a short time. The battle is depicted in a vivid painting by Plazidus Altmutter. For his bravery on 28 5 1798, he was awarded the great scenic medal. In 1808, he retired to devote himself to managing his properties in Eppan. In 1809, Count Josef Khuen played an unclear role in Andreas Hofer's fight against the Bavarians for the freedom of the Tyrol. When on 13 4 1809, due to the announced arrival of the Austrian army (battle of the Isel mountain favourable to the Tyroleans), the French left the town of Bozen, which they had occupied, Count Khuen, suspected by the peasants of being favourable to the Bavarians, quickly took his Austrian uniform and put it on. But the Lagundo peasants stopped him in the street, grabbed him and put him under arrest in Gries near Bozen in the Badl inn. The Austrian major, Baron von Walterkirchen, who had recently entered Bozen with his dragoons, had the Count taken to his lodgings ‘Zum goldenen Schlüssel’ and treated him well there. But Khuen's ordeal soon began, because the Austrian intendant, Josef Baron von Hormayr, who arrived in Bozen the same evening at his lodgings in the house of Josef von Giovanelli Senator at Erzherzog-Rainer-Straße 11, near ‘Kaiserkron’ (today's Musterplatz/Piazza della Mostra) accused the count of being a spy and, although an Austrian veteran, of having kept friendly relations with Bavarian officials and agents. As the count rejected the accusations, a storm of insults rained down on him, the peasants tore his uniform from his body, he had to fall to his knees and pray for his safety to the peasants who beat him with their weapons. The count, pale as death, made atonement. In the morning, after this eventful night (15. 4. 1809), Hormayr drove Count Khuen to Brixen on the front of a wagon protected by a heavy escort; the excited crowd still hurled curses at him during this involuntary journey. The journey continued on 25 4 via Klagenfurt, Graz, (Agram) Zagreb to Pecs (Fünfkirchen) in Hungary, where Khuen was treated as a hostage. Only on 15. August 1809, he was released by express order of the emperor (4. 6. 1809), and went to Munich via Passau. From there, he sent a petition to the then ruler of Tyrol as King Maximilian of Bavaria, in which he explained his attachment to Bavaria and attached to the petition a detailed ‘History of my expulsion’ (reprinted in Historisches Jahrbuch der österr. Görres-Gesellschaft, 1909, S. 571). In it, the count expresses himself angrily against the Austrian government. Count Josef, who belonged to line 4 of the Counts Khuen-Belasi and owned the castles Altenburg and Gandegg in Eppan, married Countess Teresa Welsperg, who was born Primör (Primiero) on 2 October 1773 and died in Bozen 28 February 1840, on 29 April 1794 (Innsbruck). She was the sister of the Bavarian commissar-general for the Etsch district, Johann Nepomuck Count Welsperg, who was born 16. 2. 1765 in Primör and died on 29. 2. 1840 in Bozen, i.e. one day after his sister's death. He too was deported to Pecs (Fünfkirchen). Count Josef Khuen died on 30. January 1819 in Bozen, his son Gabriel continued the still flourishing line.
