= Descendants of John VI of Portugal =

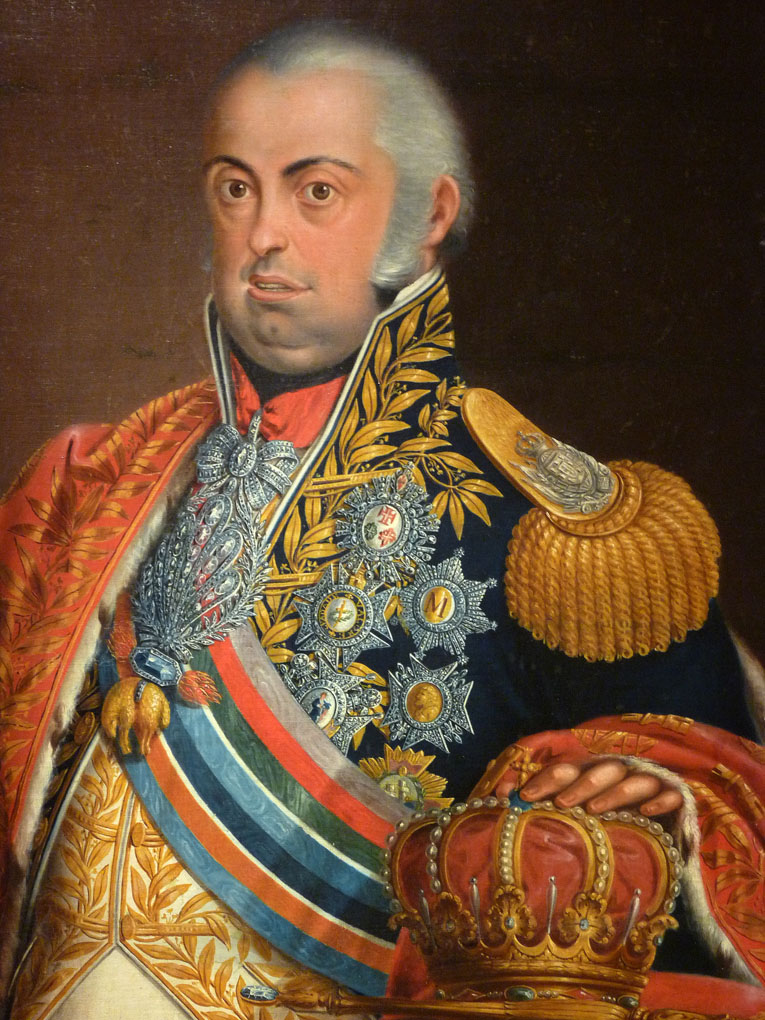
King John VI of Portugal, Brazil, and the Algarves.

The descendants of John VI of Portugal, from the main branch of the House of Braganza, are present in several royal families across Europe and Brazil. Through his second son, Miguel I, some of his descendants have become rulers in Belgium, Luxembourg, and Liechtenstein, while others have been claimants to the thrones of Portugal, Austria-Hungary, and the former Duchy of Parma. Constitutional amendments regarding succession led to disputes throughout the nation following John VI's death.

== Background ==
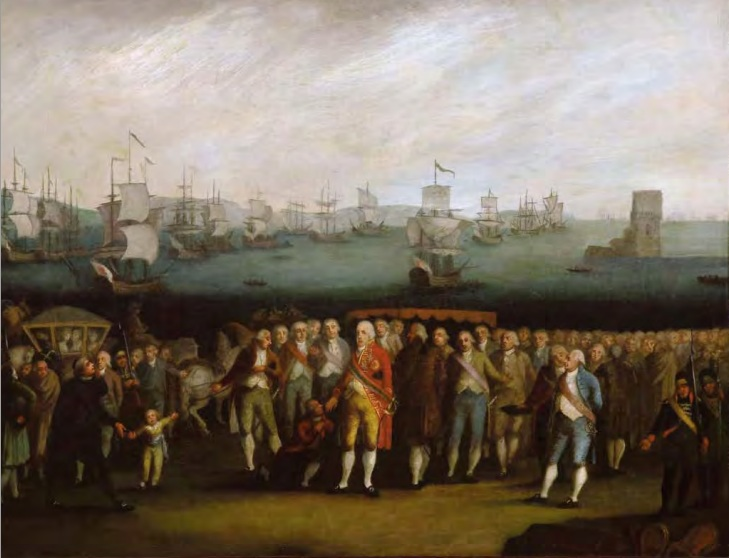
The Family of John VI Embarking from Belém, Lisbon; 1810.

John VI was born on May 13, 1767 in Lisbon, as the second son of Maria I and Pedro III. On May 8, 1785, John VI married Carlota Joaquina of Spain. They remained married until his death, and had nine children.

=== Throne of Portugal ===
John VI became heir to the Portuguese throne in 1788, after his brother, José, Prince of Brazil, died of smallpox.

In 1799, John VI became the prince regent for his mother, Maria I. Spain and France soon declared war and invaded Portugal under Napoleon Bonaparte, initiating the War of the Oranges. Although peace was attained, the Portuguese Empire suffered major territorial losses as a result.

=== Court in Rio de Janeiro ===
In 1807, the French Army invaded Portugal during the War of the Fourth Coalition. To avoid conflict, John VI relocated the Portuguese court and capital to colonial Brazil. John VI then elevated Brazil to the status of a kingdom to form the United Kingdom of Portugal, Brazil, and the Algarves.

John VI established his court in the city of Rio de Janeiro. When his mother, Maria I of Portugal, died in 1816, John VI was named king of the United Kingdom of Portugal, Brazil, and the Algarves. By that time, Napoleon had been defeated at the Battle of Waterloo, and the European courts demanded the return of the Portuguese court to Europe. John VI complied with the demands, leaving his son Pedro, later Pedro I of Brazil, as regent. Pedro later declared the independence of Brazil.

=== Division of House of Braganza ===
John VI's death in 1826 triggered a succession crisis over the Portuguese throne, with succession disputed among John VI's eldest sons and his granddaughter. This resulted in a split of the House of Braganza into three branches: the Portuguese House of Braganza, the Brazilian House of Braganza, and the Miguelist House of Braganza.

== Descendants ==
=== Maria Teresa of Braganza, Princess of Beira ===
Descendant	Image	Birth	Marriages	Death
Maria Teresa of Braganza, Princess of Beira; 1793–1874		April 29, 1793; Palace of Ajuda; Daughter of John VI and Carlota Joaquina of Spain	Infante Pedro Carlos of Spain and Portugal; May 13, 1810; 1 child Carlos V of Spain (Carlist); June 1838; No children	January 17, 1874; Trieste; Aged 80
Infante Sebastian of Portugal and Spain; 1811–1875		November 4, 1811; Rio de Janeiro; Son of Maria Teresa, Princess of Beira and Infante Pedro Carlos of Spain and Portugal	Maria Amalia of Bourbon-Two Sicilies May 25, 1832; No children Maria Cristina of Spain; November 19, 1860; 5 children	January 13, 1875; Pau; Aged 63
Francisco María, Duke of Marchena; 1861–1923		August 20, 1861; Madrid; Son of Infante Sebastian of Portugal and Spain and Maria Cristina of Spain	María del Pilar of Muguiro and Beruete; January 7, 1886; 3 children	November 17, 1923; Neuilly-sur-Seine; Aged 62
María Cristina, Duchess of Marchena; 1889–1981		July 27, 1889; Paris; Daughter of Francisco María, Duke of Marchena and María del Pilar of Muguiro and Beruete	Leopold Walford; November 11, 1911; 2 children	October 3, 1981; London; Aged 92
Juan Jorge, Duke of Ansola and Marchena; 1912–1999		August 20, 1912; Paris; Son of María Cristina, Duchess of Marchena and Leopold Walford	Emanuela Hawkins; 1935; 7 children	February 22, 1999; London; Aged 87
Juan Jacobo, former Duke of Marchena; 1941–present		July 27, 1941; London; Son of Juan Jorge, Duke of Ansola and Marchena and Emanuela Hawkins	Not married	

=== Francisco António of Braganza, Prince of Beira ===
Descendant	Image	Birth	Marriages	Death
Francisco António of Braganza, Prince of Beira; 1795–1801		March 21, 1795; Queluz Palace; Son of John VI and Carlota Joaquina of Spain	Never married	June 11, 1801; Queluz Palace; Aged 6

=== Maria Isabel of Braganza ===
Descendant	Image	Birth	Marriages	Death
Maria Isabel of Braganza; 1797–1818		May 19, 1797; Queluz Palace; Daughter of John VI and Carlota Joaquina of Spain	Ferdinand VII of Spain; September 29, 1816; 1 child	December 26, 1818; Royal Palace of Aranjuez; Aged 21

=== Pedro I & IV ===
==== As Pedro IV of Portugal (senior branch) ====
Descendant	Portrait	Birth	Marriages	Death
Pedro IV of Portugal; 1826–1826		October 12, 1798; Queluz, Sintra son of John VI of Portugal and Charlotte of Spain	Maria Leopoldina of Austria; 1817; 7 children Amélie of Leuchtenberg; 1829; 1 child	September 24, 1834; Queluz, Sintra; Aged 35
Maria II of Portugal; 1826-1853		April 4, 1819; Rio de Janeiro daughter of Pedro I and IV of Brazil and Portugal and Maria Leopoldina of Austria	Auguste de Beauharnais, 2nd Duke of Leuchtenberg; 1834; No children Fernando of Saxe-Coburg-Gotha; 1837; 11 children	November 15, 1853; Lisbon; Aged 34
Pedro V of Portugal; 1853–1861		September 16, 1837; Lisbon son of Maria II of Portugal and Fernando II of Portugal	Stephanie of Hohenzollern-Sigmaringen; 1858; No children	November 11, 1861; Lisbon; Aged 24
Luís I of Portugal; 1861–1889		October 31, 1838; Lisbon son of Maria II of Portugal and Fernando II of Portugal brother of Pedro V of Portugal	Maria Pia of Savoy; 1863; 2 children	October 19, 1889; Lisbon; Aged 50
Carlos I of Portugal; 1889–1908		September 28, 1863; Lisbon son of Luís I of Portugal and Maria Pia of Savoy	Amélie of Orléans; 1886; 3 children	February 1, 1908; Lisbon; Aged 44
Luís Filipe, Prince Royal of Portugal; 1908–1908		March 21, 1887; Lisbon son of Carlos I of Portugal and Amélie of Orléans	Never married	February 1, 1908; Lisbon; Aged 20
Manuel II of Portugal; 1908–1910		March 19, 1889; Lisbon son of Carlos I of Portugal and Amélie of Orléans brother of Luís Filipe, Prince Royal of Portugal	Augusta Victoria of Hohenzollern-Sigmaringen; 1913 No children	July 2, 1932; Fulwell, London; Aged 42

==== As Pedro I of Brazil (junior branch) ====
Descendant	Portrait	Birth	Marriages	Death
Pedro I of Brazil; 1821–1831		October 12, 1798; Queluz, Sintra son of John VI of Portugal and Charlotte of Spain	Maria Leopoldina of Austria; 1817; 7 children Amélie of Leuchtenberg; 1829; 1 child	September 24, 1834; Queluz, Sintra; Aged 35
Pedro II of Brazil; 1831–1891		December 2, 1825; Rio de Janeiro son of Pedro I of Brazil and Maria Leopoldina of Austria	Teresa of the Two Sicilies; September 17, 1842; 4 children	December 5, 1891; Paris; Aged 66
Isabel, Princess Imperial of Brazil; 1891–1921		July 29, 1846; Rio de Janeiro daughter of Pedro II of Brazil and Teresa of the Two Sicilies	Gaston, Count of Eu; October 15, 1864; 3 children	November 14, 1921; Eu, Seine-Maritime; Aged 75
Pedro Henrique of Orléans-Braganza; 1921–1981		September 13, 1909; Boulogne-Billancourt son of Prince Luís of Orléans-Braganza and Princess Maria di Grazia of Bourbon-Two Sicilies	Princess Maria Elisabeth of Bavaria; August 19, 1937; 12 children	July 5, 1981; Vassouras; Aged 71
Prince Luiz of Orléans-Braganza; 1981–2022	Prince Luiz Gastão d'Orléans-Bragance	June 6, 1938; Mandelieu-la-Napoule son of Pedro Henrique of Orléans-Braganza and Princess Maria Elisabeth of Bavaria	Never married	July 15, 2022; São Paulo; Aged 84
Prince Bertrand of Orléans-Braganza; 1941–present		February 2, 1941; Mandelieu-la-Napoule son of Pedro Henrique of Orléans-Braganza and Princess Maria Elisabeth of Bavaria	Not married	

=== Maria Francisca of Braganza ===
Descendant	Image	Birth	Marriages	Death
Maria Francisca of Braganza; 1800–1834		April 22, 1800; Queluz Palace daughter of John VI and Carlota Joaquina of Spain	Infante Carlos, Count of Molina; September 22, 1816; 3 children	September 4, 1834; Alverstoke; Aged 34
Infante Carlos, Count of Montemolin; 1818–1861		January 31, 1818; Madrid son of Maria Francisca of Portugal and Infante Carlos, Count of Molina	Maria Carolina of Bourbon-Two Sicilies; July 10, 1850; No children	January 13, 1861; Trieste; Aged 43
Juan, Count of Montizón; 1822–1887		May 15, 1822; Royal Palace of Aranjuez son of Maria Francisca of Portugal and Infante Carlos, Count of Molina	Maria Beatrix of Austria-Este; February 6, 1847; 2 children	November 18, 1887; Hove; Aged 65
Carlos, Duke of Madrid; 1848–1909		March 30, 1848; Ljubljana son of Juan, Count of Montizón and Maria Beatrix of Austria-Este	Margherita of Bourbon-Parma; February 4, 1867; 5 children Berthe de Rohan; April 28, 1894; No children	July 18, 1909; Varese; Aged 61
Jaime, Duke of Madrid; 1870–1931		June 27, 1870; Vevey son of Carlos, Duke of Madrid and Margherita of Bourbon-Parma	Never married	October 2, 1931; Paris; Aged 61
Infanta Blanca of Spain; 1868–1949		September 7, 1868; Graz daughter of Carlos, Duke of Madrid and Margherita of Bourbon-Parma	Leopold Salvator, Prince of Tuscany; October 24, 1889; 10 children	October 25, 1949; Viareggio; Aged 81
Anton, Prince of Tuscany; 1901–1987		March 20, 1901; Vienna son of Blanca of Spain and Leopold Salvator, Prince of Tuscany	Ileana of Romania; July 26, 1931; 6 children	October 22, 1987; Salzburg; Aged 86
Archduke Stefan of Austria; 1932–1998		August 15, 1932; Mödling son of Anton, Prince of Tuscany and Ileana of Romania	Mary Jerrine Soper; August 26, 1954; 5 children	November 12, 1998; Brighton; Aged 66
Christopher Habsburg-Lothringen; 1957–present		January 26, 1957; Boston son of Archduke Stefan of Austria and Mary Jerrine Soper	Elizabeth Ann Blanchette; May 2, 1987; 2 children	
Saygan Genevieve Habsburg-Lothringen; 1987–present		October 31, 1987; Mill Valley son of Christopher Habsburg-Lothringen and Elizabeth Ann Blanchette	Not married	

=== Isabel Maria of Braganza ===
Descendant	Image	Birth	Marriages	Death
Isabel Maria of Braganza; 1801–1876		July 4, 1801; Queluz Palace daughter of John VI and Carlota Joaquina of Spain	Never married	April 22, 1876; Belém; Aged 74

=== Miguel I of Portugal ===
Descendant	Image	Birth	Marriages	Death
Miguel I of Portugal; 1802–1866		October 26, 1802; Queluz Palace son of John VI and Carlota Joaquina of Spain	Adelaide of Löwenstein-Wertheim-Rosenberg; September 24, 1851; 7 children	November 14, 1866; Esselbach; Aged 64
Miguel, Duke of Braganza; 1853–1927		September 19, 1853; Kleinheubach son of Miguel I and Adelaide of Löwenstein-Wertheim-Rosenberg	Elisabeth of Thurn and Taxis; October 17, 1877; 3 children Maria Theresa of Löwenstein-Wertheim-Rosenberg; November 8, 1893; 8 children	October 11, 1927; Seebenstein; Aged 74
Miguel, Duke of Viseu; 1878–1923		September 22, 1878; Reichenau an der Rax son of Miguel, Duke of Braganza and Elisabeth of Thurn and Taxis	Anita Stewart Morris; September 15, 1909; 3 children (declared morganatic)	February 21, 1923; New York City; Aged 44
Duarte Nuno, Duke of Braganza; 1907–1976		September 23, 1907; Seebenstein son of Miguel, Duke of Braganza and Maria Theresa of Löwenstein-Wertheim-Rosenberg	Francisca of Orléans-Braganza; October 15, 1942; 3 children	December 24, 1976; Seebenstein; Aged 69
Duarte Pio, Duke of Braganza; 1945–present		May 15, 1945; Bern son of Duarte Nuno, Duke of Braganza and Francisca of Orléans-Braganza	Isabel Inês de Castro Curvelo de Herédia; May 13, 1995; 3 children	
Afonso, Prince of Beira; 1996–present		March 25, 1996; Lisbon son of Duarte Pio, Duke of Braganza and Isabel Inês de Castro Curvelo de Herédia	Not married	

=== Maria da Assunção of Braganza ===
Descendant	Image	Birth	Marriages	Death
Maria da Assunção of Braganza; 1805–1834		June 25, 1805; Queluz Palace daughter of John VI and Carlota Joaquina of Spain	Never married	January 7, 1834; Santarém; Aged 29

=== Ana de Jesus Maria of Braganza ===
Descendant	Image	Birth	Marriages	Death
Ana de Jesus Maria of Braganza; 1806–1834		October 23, 1806; Mafra Palace daughter of John VI and Carlota Joaquina of Spain	Nuno de Mendoça Rolim de Moura Barreto, Duke of Loulé; December 5, 1827; 5 children	June 22, 1857; Rome; Aged 50
Pedro de Mendoça Rolim de Moura Barreto, Duke of Loulé; 1830–1909		October 7, 1830; Paris son of Ana de Jesus Maria of Portugal and Nuno de Mendoça Rolim de Moura Barreto, Duke of Loulé	Constança Maria de Figueiredo Cabral da Camara; April 19, 1852; 2 children	March 2, 1909; Belém; Aged 79
Maria de Mendoça Rolim de Moura Barreto, Duchess of Loulé; 1853–1928		March 3, 1853; Belém daughter of Pedro de Mendoça Rolim de Moura Barreto, Duke of Loulé and Constança Maria de Figueiredo Cabral da Camara	João Maria dos Enfermos da Camara Berquó; June 18, 1887; 1 child	September 12, 1928; Belém; Aged 75
Constança de Mendoça Rolim de Moura Barreto, Duchess of Loulé; 1889–1967		August 18, 1889; Belém daughter of Maria de Mendoça Rolim de Moura Barreto, Duchess of Loulé and João Maria dos Enfermos da Camara Berquó	José Pedro de Basto Feio Folque; May 22, 1921; 5 children	December 14, 1967; Belém; Aged 79
Alberto de Mendoça Rolim de Moura Barreto, Duke of Loulé; 1923–2003		July 10, 1923; Belém son of Constança de Mendoça Rolim de Moura Barreto, Duchess of Loulé and José Pedro de Basto Feio Folque	Maria Augusta Amélia de Morais Cardoso de Menezes; July 8, 1953; 8 children	September 24, 2003; Cascais; Aged 80
Pedro de Mendoça Rolim de Moura Barreto, Duke of Loulé; 1958–present		March 9, 1958; Lisbon son of Alberto de Mendoça Rolim de Moura Barreto, Duke of Loulé and Maria Augusta Amélia de Morais Cardoso de Menezes	Margarida Corrêa de Barros Vaz Pinto; 1997; 2 children	
D. Henrique Nuno de Mendoça Rolim de Moura Barreto; 1997–present		August 21, 1997; Lisbon son of Pedro de Mendoça Rolim de Moura Barreto, Duke of Loulé and Margarida Corrêa de Barros Vaz Pinto	Not married	

== See also ==
- Descendants of Manuel I of Portugal
- Descendants of Miguel I of Portugal
