= Descendants of Miguel I of Portugal =

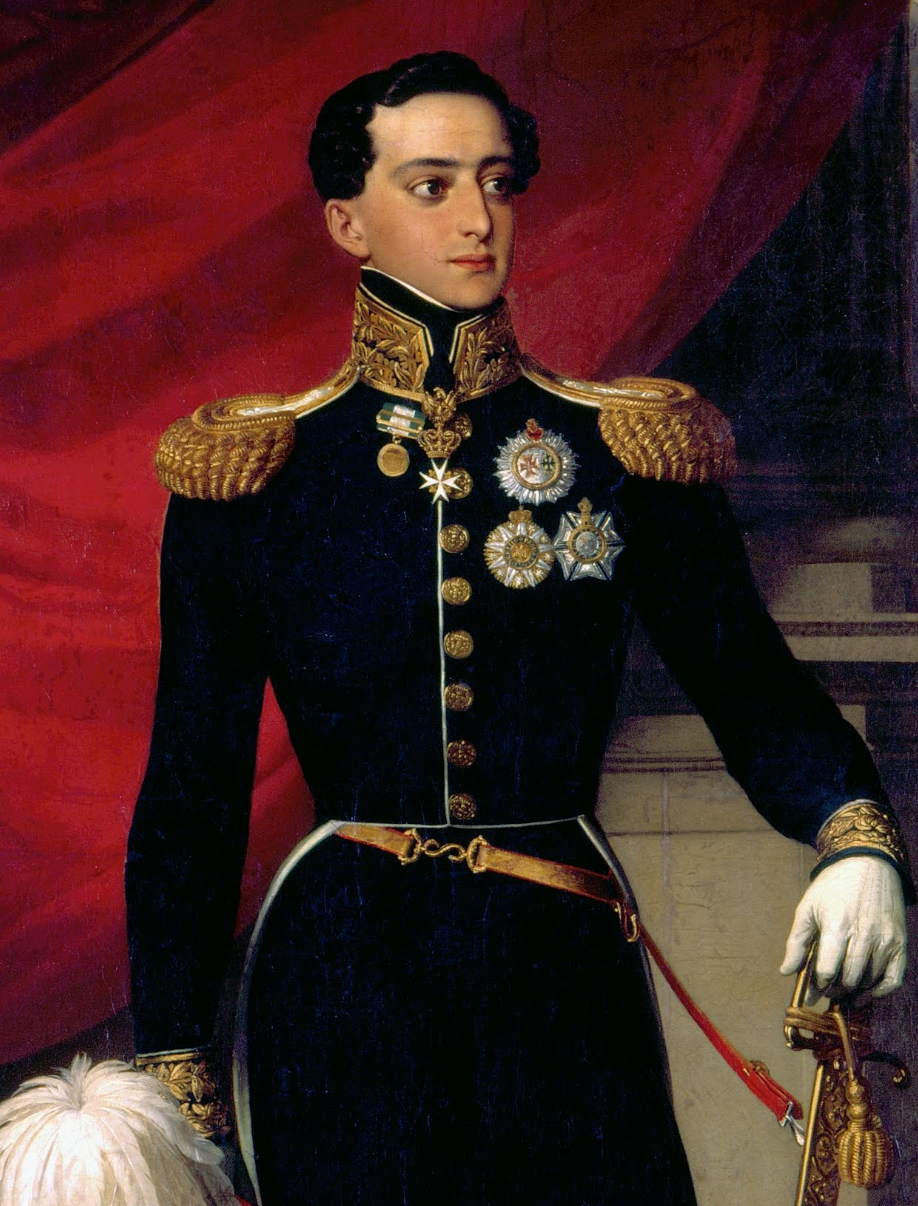
King Miguel I of Portugal and the Algarves

The descendants of Miguel I of Portugal, of the House of Braganza, were numerous and left a lasting mark on European royalty. Miguel married Princess Adelaide of Löwenstein and the strategic marriages for all of their children into various European royalties would earn Miguel the nickname of Grandfather of Europe.

His descendants can be found in both reigning and non-reigning royal families all over Europe.

This article deals with the children of Miguel I and in turn their senior heirs.

== Background on Miguel I ==
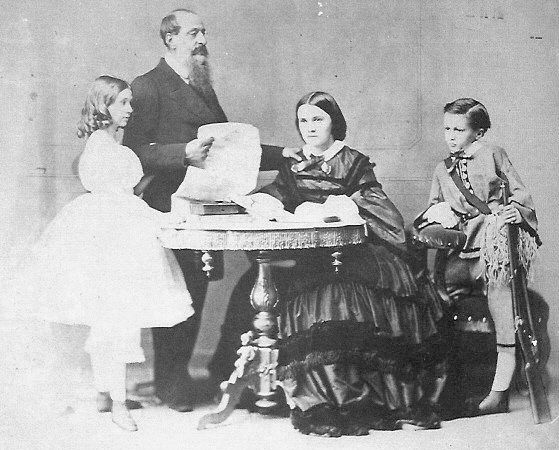
King Miguel I, his wife and two eldest children; c. 1865

Miguel, born on 26 October 1802 at Queluz Royal Palace, was the second son of King João VI and Carlota Joaquina of Spain.

=== Throne of Portugal ===
In 1823, Miguel led a coup in an attempt to place himself on the throne and restore the absolutist regime to Portugal. The coup, known as the Vilafrancada, took place on 27 May 1823, in Vila Franca de Xira.

The coup was unsuccessful and Miguel was forgiven and made chief of the army. This would not play out well, as Miguel would use his forces in the April Revolt. Following the eventual demise of the April Revolt, Miguel was exiled from Portugal.

Miguel returned to Portugal, as regent to his niece Queen Maria II of Portugal and also a potential royal consort. While regent, he seized the Portuguese throne in accordance with the so-called Fundamental Laws of the Kingdom and reigned for six years. His older brother Pedro IV of Portugal, Maria II's father, lost his, and therefore her, rights from the moment that Pedro had made war on Portugal and become the sovereign of a foreign state (the Brazilian Empire). This led to a difficult political situation which culminated in the Portuguese Liberal Wars between the absolutist Miguelists and constitutionalist liberals.

Pedro, Duke of Braganza (former Pedro IV of Portugal and I of Brazil) launched a campaign from the Azores which would eventually topple Miguel. The Miguelite War, one of the many names given to the civil war, would last throughout the six-year duration of Miguel's reign and would end with the Concession of Evoramonte, when Miguel renounced his claims to the throne, recognized Maria II as queen, and was exiled from Portugal.

Miguel would spend his exiled years in the Grand Duchy of Baden, where he would have seven children, with his wife Princess Adelaide of Löwenstein. He and his wife would spend a great deal of their resources seeking to establish their family, through advantageous marriages of their children. Their descendants include the reigning sovereigns of Belgium, Liechtenstein, and Luxembourg.

== Descendants ==
On 24 September 1851, Miguel I married Princess Adelaide of Löwenstein. The couple had 7 children:

=== Maria das Neves of Braganza ===
Descendant	Image	Birth	Marriages	Death
Maria das Neves of Braganza; 1852–1941		5 August 1852; Kleinheubach daughter of Miguel I and Adelaide of Löwenstein	Alfonso Carlos of Bourbon; April 26, 1871 no children	14 February 1941; Vienna aged 88

=== Miguel Januário of Braganza ===
Descendant	Image	Birth	Marriages	Death
Miguel Januário of Braganza; 1853–1927		19 September 1853; Kleinheubach son of Miguel I and Adelaide of Löwenstein	Elisabeth of Thurn and Taxis; 17 October 1877; 3 children Maria Theresa of Löwenstein-Wertheim-Rosenberg; 8 November 1893; 8 children	11 October 1927; Seebenstein aged 74
Miguel Maria Maximiliano of Braganza; 1878–1923		22 September 1878; Reichenau an der Rax son of Miguel Januário of Braganza and Elisabeth of Thurn and Taxis	Anita Stewart Morris; 15 September 1909; 3 children (renounced rights to the Throne July 1920)	21 February 1923; New York City aged 44
Duarte Nuno of Braganza; 1907–1976		23 September 1907; Seebenstein son of Miguel Januário of Braganza and Maria Theresa of Löwenstein	Maria Francisca of Orléans-Braganza; 15 October 1942; 3 children	24 December 1976; Seebenstein aged 69
Duarte Pio of Braganza; 1945–present		15 May 1945; Bern son of Duarte Nuno of Braganza and Maria Francisca of Orléans-Braganza	Isabel Inês de Castro Curvelo de Herédia; 13 May 1995; 3 children	
Afonso of Santa Maria of Braganza; 1996–present		25 March 1996; Lisbon son of Duarte Pio of Braganza and Isabel Inês de Castro Curvelo de Herédia	not married	

=== Maria Teresa of Braganza ===
Descendant	Image	Birth	Marriages	Death
Maria Teresa of Braganza; 1855–1944		24 August 1855; Kleinheubach daughter of Miguel I and Adelaide of Löwenstein	Archduke Karl Ludwig of Austria; 23 July 1873; 2 children	12 February 1944; Vienna aged 88
Archduchess Maria Annunciata of Austria; 1876–1961		31 July 1876; Reichenau an der Rax daughter of Maria Teresa of Braganza and Archduke Karl Ludwig of Austria	never married	8 April 1961; Vienna aged 84
Archduchess Elisabeth Amalie of Austria; 1878–1960		7 July 1878; Reichenau an der Rax daughter of Maria Teresa of Braganza and Archduke Karl Ludwig of Austria	Prince Aloys of Liechtenstein; 20 April 1903; 8 children	13 March 1960; Liechtenstein aged 81
Franz Joseph II of Liechtenstein; 1906–1989		16 August 1906; Styria son of Archduchess Elisabeth Amalie of Austria and Prince Aloys of Liechtenstein	Countess Georgina von Wilczek; 7 March 1943; 5 children	13 November 1989; Grabs aged 81
Hans-Adam II of Liechtenstein; 1945–present		14 February 1945; Zurich son of Franz Joseph II of Liechtenstein and Countess Georgina von Wilczek	Countess Marie Kinsky von Wchinitz und Tettau; 30 July 1967; 4 children	
Alois, Hereditary Prince of Liechtenstein; 1968–present		11 June 1968; Zurich son of Hans-Adam II of Liechtenstein and Countess Marie Kinsky von Wchinitz und Tettau	Princess Sophie, Duchess in Bavaria; 3 July 1993; 4 children	
Prince Joseph Wenzel of Liechtenstein; 1995–present		24 May 1995; London son of Alois, Hereditary Prince of Liechtenstein and Princess Sophie, Duchess in Bavaria	not married	

=== Maria José of Braganza ===
Descendant	Image	Birth	Marriages	Death
Maria José of Braganza; 1857–1943		19 March 1857; Wertheim am Main daughter of Miguel I and Adelaide of Löwenstein	Karl Theodor, Duke in Bavaria; 29 April 1874; 5 children	11 March 1943; Munich aged 85
Ludwig Wilhelm, Duke in Bavaria; 1884–1968		17 January 1884; Schloss Tegernsee son of Maria José of Braganza and Karl Theodor, Duke in Bavaria	Eleonore Anna Lucie of Sayn-Wittgenstein-Berleburg; 19 March 1917 no children	5 November 1968; Wildbad Kreuth aged 84
Elisabeth of Bavaria; 1876–1965		25 July 1876; Possenhofen Castle daughter of Maria José of Braganza and Duke Karl Theodor in Bavaria	Albert I of Belgium; 2 October 1900; 3 children	23 November 1965; Brussels aged 89
Leopold III, King of the Belgians; 1901–1983		3 November 1901; Brussels son of Elisabeth of Bavaria and Albert I of Belgium	Astrid of Sweden; 4 November 1926; 3 children Lilian Baels; 11 September 1941; 3 children	25 September 1983; Woluwe-Saint-Lambert aged 81
Baudouin, King of the Belgians; 1930–1993		7 September 1930; Laeken son of Leopold III of Belgium and Astrid of Sweden	Fabiola de Mora y Aragón; 15 December 1960 no children	31 July 1993; Villa Astrida, Motril aged 62
Albert II, King of the Belgians; 1934–present		6 June 1934; Laeken son of Leopold III of Belgium and Astrid of Sweden	Paola Ruffo di Calabria; 2 July 1959; 3 children	
Philippe, King of the Belgians; 1960–present		15 April 1960; Laeken son of Albert II of Belgium and Paola Ruffo di Calabria	Mathilde d'Udekem d'Acoz; 4 December 1999; 4 children	
Princess Elisabeth, Duchess of Brabant; 2001–present		25 October 2001; Anderlecht daughter of Prince Philippe, Duke of Brabant and Mathilde d'Udekem d'Acoz	not married	

=== Adelgundes de Jesus of Braganza ===
Descendant	Image	Birth	Marriages	Death
Adelgundes de Jesus of Braganza; 1858–1946		10 November 1858; Wertheim am Main daughter of Miguel I and Adelaide of Löwenstein	Prince Henry, Count of Bardi; 15 October 1876 no children	15 April 1946; Bern aged 87

=== Maria Ana of Braganza ===
Descendant	Image	Birth	Marriages	Death
Maria Ana of Braganza; 1861–1942		13 July 1861; Wertheim am Main daughter of Miguel I and Adelaide of Löwenstein	William IV of Luxembourg; 21 June 1893; 6 children	31 July 1942; New York City aged 81
Marie-Adélaïde, Grand Duchess of Luxembourg; 1894–1924		14 June 1894; Berg Castle daughter of Maria Ana of Braganza and William IV of Luxembourg	never married	24 January 1924; Schloss Hohenburg aged 29
Charlotte, Grand Duchess of Luxembourg; 1896–1985		23 January 1896; Berg Castle daughter of Maria Ana of Braganza and William IV of Luxembourg	Prince Felix of Bourbon-Parma; 6 November 1919; 6 children	9 July 1985; Schloss Fischbach aged 89
Jean, Grand Duke of Luxembourg; 1921–2019		5 January 1921; Berg Castle son of Charlotte, Grand Duchess of Luxembourg and Prince Felix of Bourbon-Parma	Princess Joséphine Charlotte of Belgium; 9 April 1953; 5 children	23 April 2019; Luxembourg City, Luxembourg aged 98
Henri, Grand Duke of Luxembourg; 1955–present		16 April 1955; Betzdorf Castle son of Jean, Grand Duke of Luxembourg and Princess Joséphine Charlotte of Belgium	Maria Teresa Mestre y Batista-Falla; 7 November 1980; 5 children	
Guillaume V, Grand Duke of Luxembourg; 1981–present		11 November 1981; Luxembourg son of Henri, Grand Duke of Luxembourg and Maria Teresa Mestre y Batista-Falla	Countess Stéphanie de Lannoy; 20 October 2012; 2 sons	
Prince Charles of Luxembourg; 2020–present		10 May 2020; Luxembourg son of Guillaume, Hereditary Grand Duke of Luxembourg and Countess Stéphanie de Lannoy	not married	

=== Maria Antónia of Braganza ===
Descendant	Image	Birth	Marriages	Death
Maria Antónia of Braganza; 1862–1959		28 November 1862; Wertheim am Main daughter of Miguel I and Adelaide of Löwenstein	Robert I, Duke of Parma; 15 October 1884; 12 children	14 May 1959; Berg Castle aged 96
Prince Sixtus of Bourbon-Parma; 1886–1934		1 August 1886; Canton of St. Gallen son of Maria Antónia of Braganza and Robert I, Duke of Parma	Princess Hedwig de la Rochefoucauld; 14 March 1919; 1 child	14 March 1934; Paris aged 47 (pre-succession death)
Xavier, Duke of Parma; 1889–1977		25 May 1889; Camaiore son of Maria Antónia of Braganza and Robert I, Duke of Parma	Madeleine de Bourbon; 12 November 1927; 6 children	7 May 1977; Zizers aged 87
Carlos Hugo, Duke of Parma; 1930–2010		8 April 1930; Paris son of Xavier, Duke of Parma and Madeleine de Bourbon	Princess Irene of the Netherlands; 29 April 1964; 4 children	18 August 2010; Barcelona aged 80
Carlos, Duke of Parma; 1970–present		27 January 1970; Nijmegen son of Carlos Hugo, Duke of Parma and Princess Irene of the Netherlands	Annemarie Gualthérie van Weezel; 28 August 2010; 3 children	

== See also ==
- Descendants of Christian IX of Denmark – Describes progeny of another European king whose descendants married into multiple royal families
- Descendants of Queen Victoria
- Descendants of John VI of Portugal
- Descendants of Manuel I of Portugal
