= Princess Maria Antónia of Bragança =

Portuguese royal (1903–1973)

Maria Antónia de Bragança
- Mrs. Chanler
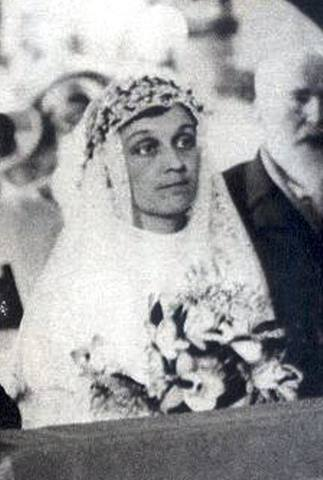
- Maria Antónia on her wedding day
- Born: 12 March 1903; Villa Arciducale, Viareggio, Kingdom of Italy
- Died: February 6, 1973 (aged 69); Water Mill, New York
- Spouse: Sidney Ashley Chanler (m. 1934; div. 1948)
- Issue: Maria Mafalda Teresa de Bragança Chanler; Antony Ashley de Bragança Chanler; Robert Alain de Bragança Chanler
Names
- Maria Antónia Micaela Rafaela Gabriela Adelaide Xavier Josefa Expedita Gregoria de Bragança
- House: Braganza
- Father: Miguel Januário, Duke of Braganza
- Mother: Princess Maria Theresa of Löwenstein

Princess Maria Antónia of Braganza (Maria Antónia Micaela Rafaela Gabriela Adelaide Xavier Josefa Expedita Gregoria) (12 March 1903, Viareggio, Lucca, Toscana, Italy – 6 February 1973, Water Mill, Suffolk, New York) was a member of the House of Braganca. She married Sidney Ashley Chanler, the grandson of John Winthrop Chanler and Margaret Astor Ward.

== Family ==
Maria Antónia was born at the Villa Arciducale in Viareggio, a Tuscan commune. Her namesake, the Duchess of Parma, was sister-in-law to the Villa's owner, Infanta Blanca of Spain, Archduchess of Austria. This hospitality was likely why Maria Antónia was named after her father's sister. Her parents, Miguel Januário, Duke of Braganza, and Princess Maria Theresa of Löwenstein, were the Miguelist claimants to the deposed Portuguese throne. Maria Antónia was thus an aunt to Johannes, 11th Prince of Thurn and Taxis and Duarte Pio, Duke of Braganza, as well as a first cousin, twice removed to Hans-Adam II, Prince of Liechtenstein, King Albert II of Belgium and Henri, Grand Duke of Luxembourg.

== Marriage and issue ==
Maria Antónia married American heir Sidney Ashley Chanler on June 13, 1934, at Burg Seebenstein. Chanler was the son of novelist, politician, and explorer Rep. William A. Chanler and stage actress Minnie Ashley, thus making him a relative of the Stuyvesant family, the Astor family, the Livingston family, the Schuyler family, and the Dudley-Winthrop family, as well as a descendant of John Jacob Astor, Samuel Ward, Jr., Gen. John Armstrong, Gov. William Greene, Gov. William Greene Jr., Samuel Gorton, Robert Livingston, Gov. Richard Ward, Peter Stuyvesant, and others. They later divorced in December 1948. She never remarried, though he remarried twice.

During her marriage, Maria Antónia used the title and style of: Her Royal Highness Princess Maria Antónia of Braganza, Mrs. Chanler.

- Maria Mafalda Teresa de Bragança Chanler (1 Apr 1935 in Barrytown, New York), who married and divorced Baron Emanuel von Pereira-Arnstein (1931-1976) in 1962. She later wed Count Andrei Ivanovich Stenbock-Fermor on November 24, 1967. From this marriage, they had two children
  - Count Alexis Stenbock-Fermor (born 1968)
  - Countess Xenia Stenbock-Fermor (born 1969). Xenia and Camillo Costa have three children.
    - Alexandre Costa (born 21 September 1997)
    - Emanuele Costa (born 2000)
    - Sophia Costa (born 2003)
- Antony Ashley de Bragança Chanler (21 Feb 1938 in New York City – 23 Dec 2016), died unmarried and without issue.
- Robert Alain de Bragança Chanler (12 May 1941 in New York City – 2014 at the Casa Da Infanta in Ferragudo, Portugal), died unmarried.

== Later life and death ==
After her divorce, Princess Maria Antónia spent her summers at her home on Cobb Road in Water Mill, New York, part of The Hamptons summer colony. She spent her winters at the Casa da Infanta in Ferragudo, Portugal. The primary resident of the home at this time was her younger sister, Princess Filipa de Bragança (1905-1990), with whom she had a close relationship.

== Ancestry ==
Ancestors of Princess Maria Antónia of Bragança

8. John VI of Portugal
4. Miguel I of Portugal
9. Infanta Carlota Joaquina of Spain
2. Miguel Januário, Duke of Braganza
10. Constantine, Hereditary Prince of Löwenstein
5. Princess Adelaide of Löwenstein
11. Princess Agnes of Hohenlohe-Langenburg
1. Princess Maria Antónia of Braganza
12. Constantine, Hereditary Prince of Löwenstein (= 10)
6. Charles, Prince of Löwenstein
13. Princess Agnes of Hohenlohe-Langenburg (= 11)
3. Princess Maria Theresa of Löwenstein
14. Alois II, Prince of Liechtenstein
7. Princess Sophie of Liechtenstein
15. Countess Franziska Kinsky of Wchinitz and Tettau
