= Infanta Maria Benedicta of Braganza =

Portuguese infanta (1896–1971)

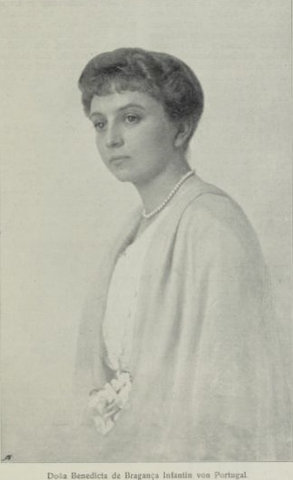
- Maria Benedicta in 1916
- Born: 12 August 1896; Kleinheubach, Kingdom of Bavaria, German Empire
- Died: 6 April 1971 (aged 74); Seebenstein, Austria
- Burial: Friedhof Seebenstein, Lower Austria, Austria
Names
- Maria Benedicta Clara Sofia Aloisia Micaela Gabriela Rafaela de Bragança
- House: House of Braganza
- Father: Miguel Januário, Duke of Braganza
- Mother: Princess Maria Theresa of Löwenstein-Wertheim-Rosenberg
- Religion: Roman Catholicism

Infanta Maria Benedicta of Portugal (Portuguese: Maria Benedicta Clara Sofia Aloísia Micaela Gabriela Rafaela de Bragança; 12 August 1896 – 6 April 1971) was a member of the Miguelist branch of the House of Braganza.

== Early life ==
Infanta Maria Benedicta was born on 12 August 1896 at Schloss Löwenstein in Kleinheubach, Kingdom of Bavaria, she was the second daughter of Miguel Januário, Duke of Braganza, the Miguelist claimant to the Portuguese throne, and his second wife Princess Maria Theresa of Löwenstein-Wertheim-Rosenberg. Due to the political exile of her branch of the royal family under the Portuguese law of banishment of 1834, her family was forced to reside permanently within the German and Austrian empires. She was raised alongside her siblings primarily at the family's seasonal residences in Bavaria and Austria-Hungary, where she received a private education conducted by tutors.

== Later life and death ==
Prior to the outbreak of World War I, Maria Benedicta was recorded as an unmarried daughter residing within her father's household registries. Following the geopolitical transitions in Central Europe after the war, she did not assume any public political or royal duties. She spent her later decades engaged in private family and religious life at the Braganza properties in Lower Austria, and died without issue on 6 April 1971 at the age of 74 in Seebenstein, Austria.

== Ancestry ==
Ancestors of Infanta Maria Benedicta of Braganza

8. John VI of Portugal
4. Miguel I of Portugal
9. Carlota Joaquina of Spain
2. Miguel Januário, Duke of Braganza
10. Constantine, Hereditary Prince of Löwenstein-Wertheim-Rosenberg
5. Princess Adelaide of Löwenstein-Wertheim-Rosenberg
11. Princess Agnes of Hohenlohe-Langenburg
1. Infanta Maria Benedicta of Braganza
12. Constantine, Hereditary Prince of Löwenstein-Wertheim-Rosenberg (= 10)
6. Charles, Prince of Löwenstein-Wertheim-Rosenberg
13. Princess Agnes of Hohenlohe-Langenburg (= 11)
3. Princess Maria Theresa of Löwenstein-Wertheim-Rosenberg
14. Alois II, Prince of Liechtenstein
7. Princess Sophie of Liechtenstein
15. Countess Franziska Kinsky of Wchinitz and Tettau

== Bibliography ==
- Hof- og Statskalender (1909). Kongelig Dansk Hof- og Statskalender (PDF) (in Danish). Copenhagen: H. H. Thiele.
