= Prince Miguel, Duke of Braganza =

Claimant to the throne of Portugal (1853–1927)

Miguel Januário de Bragança
- Duke of Braganza (Miguelist)
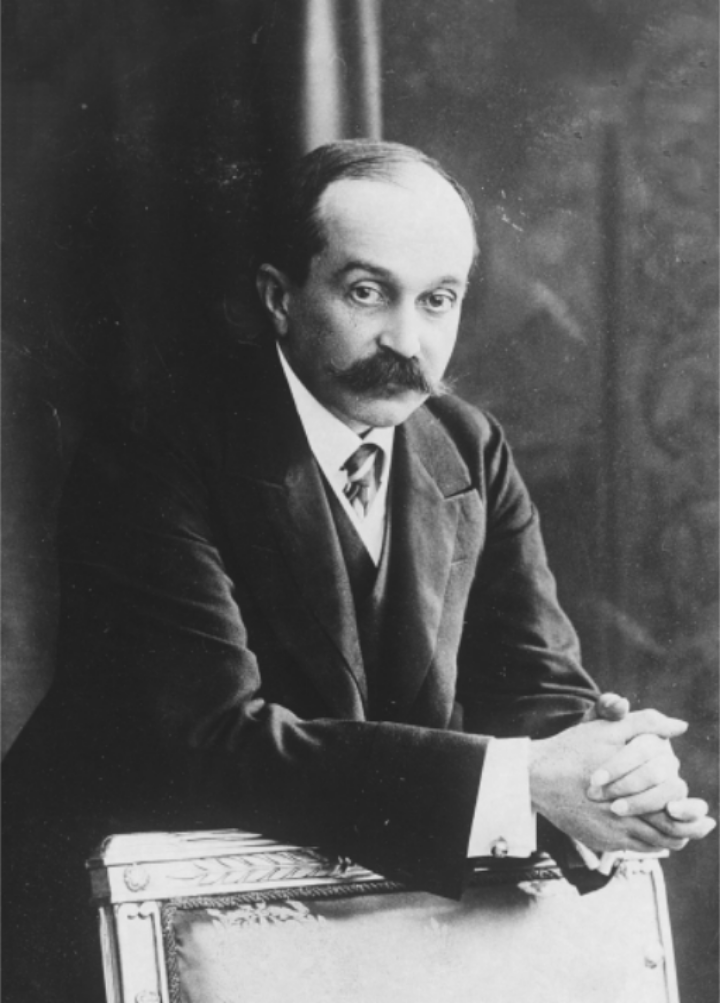
- 1907 portrait

Miguelist pretender to the Portuguese throne
- Tenure: 14 November 1866 – 31 July 1920
- Predecessor: Miguel I
- Successor: Duarte II
- Born: 19 September 1853; Kleinheubach, Bavaria, German Confederation
- Died: 11 October 1927 (aged 74); Seebenstein, Austria
- Spouses: Princess Elisabeth of Thurn and Taxis (m. 1877; died 1881) Princess Maria Theresa of Löwenstein-Wertheim-Rosenberg (m. 1893)
- Issue: Prince Miguel, Duke of Viseu; Prince Francisco José; Maria Teresa, Princess Karl Ludwig of Thurn and Taxis; Isabel Maria, Princess of Thurn and Taxis; Princess Maria Benedita; Princess Mafalda; Maria Ana, Princess Karl August of Thurn and Taxis; Princess Maria Antónia of Braganza, Mrs. Chanler; Princess Filipa Maria; Prince Duarte Nuno, Duke of Braganza; Princess Maria Adelaide, Mrs. van Uden
Names
- Miguel Maria Carlos Egídio Constantino Gabriel Rafael Gonzaga Francisco de Paula e de Assis Januário de Bragança
- House: Braganza
- Father: Miguel I of Portugal
- Mother: Adelaide of Löwenstein-Wertheim-Rosenberg
- Religion: Catholic

Prince Miguel, Duke of Braganza (19 September 1853 – 11 October 1927) was the Miguelist claimant to the throne of Portugal from 1866 to 1920. He used the title Duke of Braganza.

== Early life ==
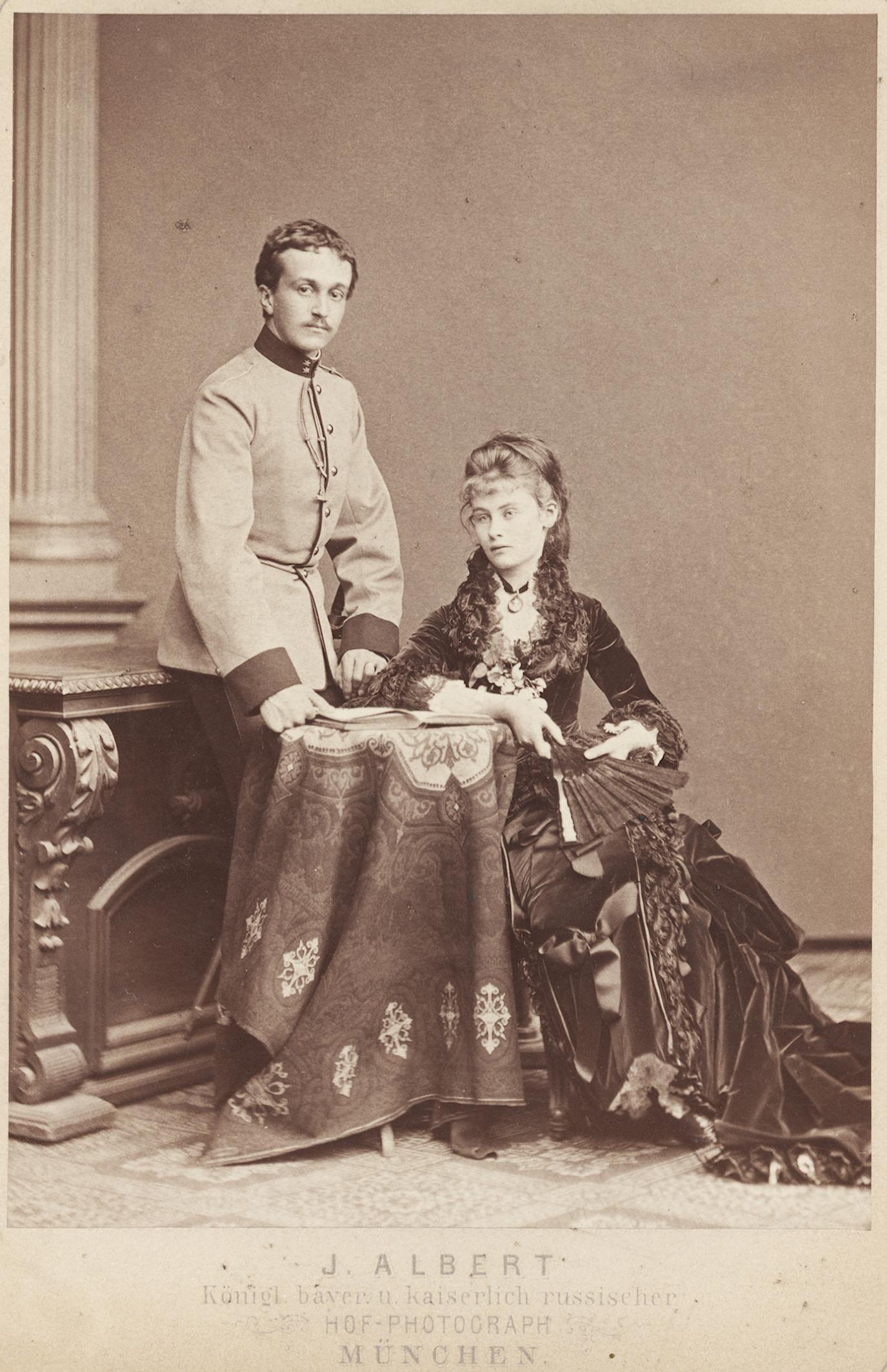
Miguel Januário with his first wife Princess Elisabeth of Thurn and Taxis, 1877.

Miguel Januário was born in Castle Kleinheubach, near Miltenberg, Kingdom of Bavaria, on 19 September 1853 during the exile in Germany of his father, former King Miguel I of Portugal and the Algarves. His mother was Princess Adelaide of Löwenstein-Wertheim-Rosenberg. He was a grandson of King John VI of Portugal, Brazil and the Algarves and his wife, Queen Carlota Joaquina.

By the Portuguese law of banishment of 1834 and the constitution of 1838, King Miguel was forbidden to enter Portugal. Therefore, he was educated in the German Confederation and in Austria-Hungary.

== Career ==
He was a member of the staff of Emperor Franz Joseph I of Austria and took part in the Austro-Hungarian campaign in Bosnia and Herzegovina in 1878. It is said that the Emperor liked Miguel Januário immensely and granted him the privilege of extraterritoriality that allowed him to remain Portuguese, despite the rejection of Portugal. His second son, Prince Francisco José of Braganza, was named after the Austrian Emperor, who was his godfather.

Miguel Januário held the rank of a colonel in the 7th Austrian Regiment of Hussars. During World War I, he held the rank of Lieutenant General (Feldmarschalleutnant) in the Austro-Hungarian Army. He resigned in 1917 when Portugal entered the conflict on the opposite side, and spent the rest of the war as a civilian in the Order of Malta. After the end of Austria-Hungary, Miguel Januário and his family were thrown into relative poverty.

On 31 July 1920, after quarrels with his eldest son (who contracted a controversial marriage to an American heiress), Miguel Januário renounced his claims as King of Portugal in favour of his third son, Duarte Nuno, who was 12 years old at the time.

== Marriages and children ==
Miguel Januário was first married to Princess Elisabeth of Thurn and Taxis, the niece of Empress Elisabeth of Austria, on 17 October 1877 in Regensburg. They had three children:

- Dom Miguel, Duke of Viseu (1878–1923), married Anita Stewart and had issue.
- Dom Francisco José de Bragança (1879–1919), died unmarried and without issue.
- Dona Maria Teresa de Bragança (1881–1945), married Prince Karl Ludwig of Thurn und Taxis and had issue.

After the death of his first wife in 1881, he married for a second time to his first cousin Princess Maria Theresa of Löwenstein-Wertheim-Rosenberg, on 8 November 1893 at Kleinheubach. They had eight children:

- Dona Isabel Maria de Bragança (1894–1970), married Franz Joseph, 9th Prince of Thurn and Taxis and had issue.
- Dona Maria Benedita de Bragança (1896–1971), died unmarried and without issue.
- Dona Mafalda de Bragança (1898–1918), died unmarried and without issue.
- Dona Maria Ana de Bragança (1899–1971), married the future Karl August, 10th Prince of Thurn and Taxis and had issue.
- Dona Maria Antónia de Bragança (1903–1973), married Sidney Ashley Chanler (son of William Astor Chanler) and had issue.
- Dona Filipa Maria de Bragança (1905–1990), died unmarried and without issue.
- Dom Duarte Nuno, Duke of Braganza (1907–1976), married Princess Maria Francisca de Orléans e Bragança and had issue.
- Dona Maria Adelaide de Bragança (1912–2012), married Nicolaas van Uden and had issue.

Miguel Januário died in Seebenstein, on October 11, 1927. He is buried at Kloster Maria Himmelfahrt in Bronnbach.

== Honours ==
- Kingdom of Portugal: Grand Master of the Order of St. Michael of the Wing
- Austria-Hungary: Knight of the Golden Fleece, 1881
- Kingdom of Bavaria: Knight of St. Hubert, 1900

== In film ==
In the 1968 film Mayerling, "Michel de Bragance" is a minor character played by Jean-Claude Bercq.

== See also ==
- Descendants of Miguel I of Portugal

== Ancestry ==
Ancestors of Prince Miguel, Duke of Braganza

8. Peter III of Portugal
4. John VI of Portugal and Brazil
9. Maria I of Portugal and Brazil
2. Miguel I of Portugal
10. Charles IV of Spain
5. Infanta Carlota Joaquina of Spain
11. Princess Maria Luisa of Parma
1. Miguel Januário, Duke of Braganza
12. Charles Thomas, Prince of Löwenstein-Wertheim-Rosenberg
6. Constantine, Hereditary Prince of Löwenstein-Wertheim-Rosenberg
13. Countess Sophie of Windisch-Graetz
3. Princess Adelaide of Löwenstein-Wertheim-Rosenberg
14. Karl Ludwig, Prince of Hohenlohe-Langenburg
7. Princess Agnes of Hohenlohe-Langenburg
15. Countess Amalie Henriette of Solms-Baruth

Prince Miguel, Duke of Braganza House of Braganza Cadet branch of the House of Aviz Born: 19 September 1853 Died: 11 October 1927
Portuguese nobility
Preceded by Miguel	Duke of Braganza; Miguelist line 14 November 1866 – 31 July 1920	Succeeded by Duarte Nuno
Titles in pretence
Preceded by Miguel I	— TITULAR — King of Portugal; Miguelist line 14 November 1866 – 31 July 1920	Succeeded by Duarte II
