= Princess Maria Theresa of Löwenstein-Wertheim-Rosenberg =

Princess Maria Theresa
- Duchess of Braganza (Miguelist)
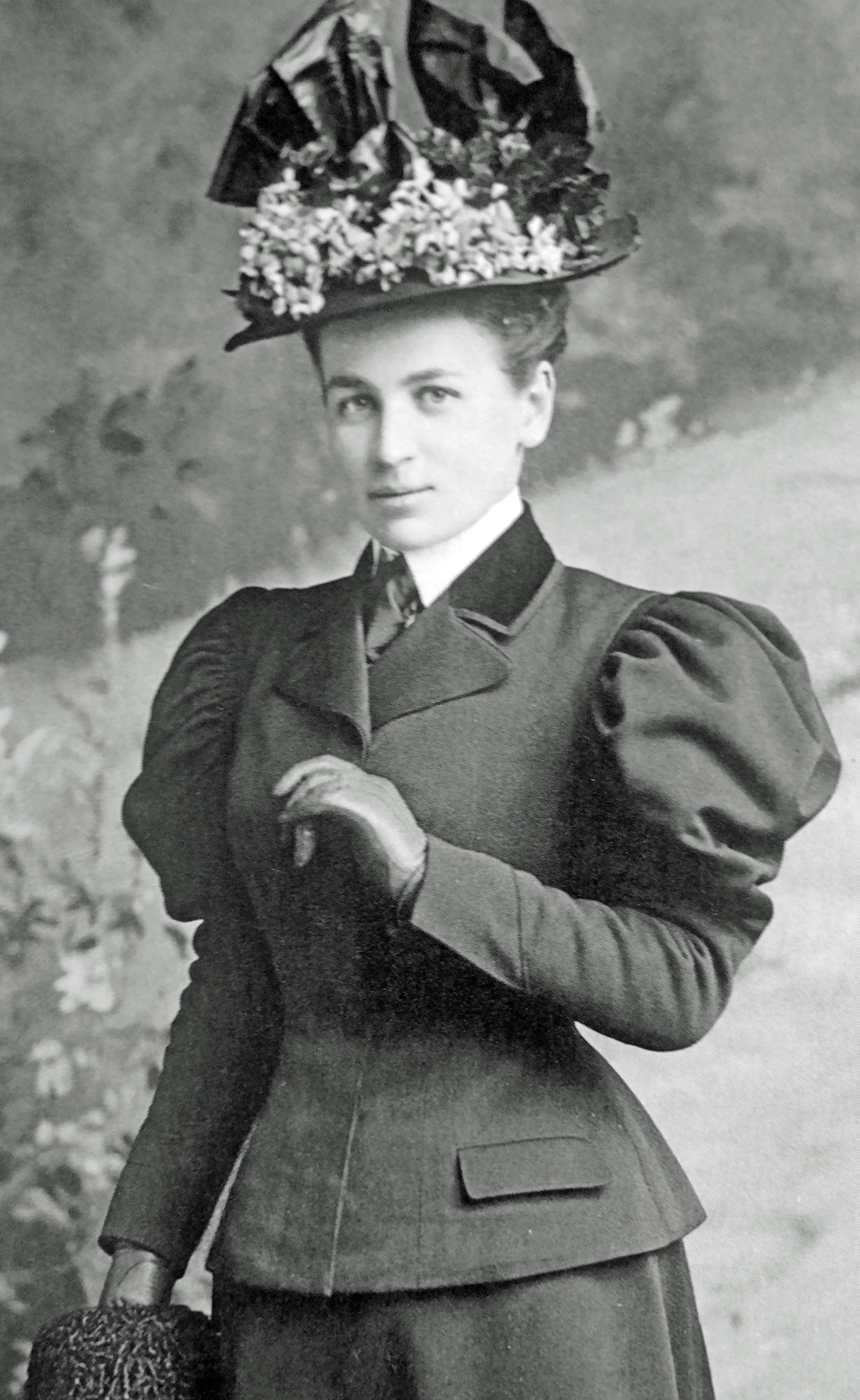
- Born: 4 January 1870; Rome, Papal States
- Died: 17 January 1935 (aged 65); Vienna, Austria
- Spouse: Miguel Januário, Duke of Braganza (m. 1893; died 1927)
- Issue: Isabel Maria, Princess of Thurn and Taxis; Princess Maria Benedita; Princess Mafalda; Maria Ana, Princess Karl August of Thurn and Taxis; Princess Maria Antónia, Mrs. Chanler; Princess Filipa; Prince Duarte Nuno, Duke of Braganza; Princess Maria Adelaide, Mrs. van Uden
- House: Löwenstein-Wertheim-Rosenberg
- Father: Charles, Prince of Löwenstein
- Mother: Princess Sophie of Liechtenstein

Princess Maria Theresa of Löwenstein-Wertheim-Rosenberg (German: Maria Theresa, Prinzessin von Löwenstein-Wertheim-Rosenberg) (4 January 1870, Rome, Papal States – 17 January 1935, Vienna, Federal State of Austria) was a Princess of Löwenstein-Wertheim-Rosenberg and a member of the House of Löwenstein-Wertheim-Rosenberg by birth and an Infanta of Portugal, Duchess consort of Braganza, and titular queen consort of Portugal through her marriage to Miguel Januário, Duke of Braganza, Miguelist claimant to the throne of Portugal from 1866 to 1920.

== Family ==
Maria Theresa was the fifth child and fourth daughter of Charles, Prince of Löwenstein, brother of titular queen consort of Portugal Adelaide of Löwenstein, and his wife Princess Sophie of Liechtenstein. Maria Theresa was an elder sister of Aloys, Prince of Löwenstein.

== Marriage and issue ==
Maria Theresa married her first cousin Miguel Januário, Duke of Braganza, only son and second eldest child of former King Miguel of Portugal and his wife Adelaide of Löwenstein, on 8 November 1893 in Kleinheubach, Kingdom of Bavaria. Maria Theresa and Miguel had eight children:

- Dona Isabel Maria de Bragança (1894–1970), married Franz Joseph, 9th Prince of Thurn and Taxis and had issue
- Dona Maria Benedita de Bragança (1896–1971), died unmarried and without issue
- Dona Mafalda de Bragança (1898–1918), died unmarried and without issue
- Dona Maria Ana of Braganza (1899–1971), married Karl August, 10th Prince of Thurn and Taxis and had issue
- Dona Maria Antónia of Braganza (1903–1973), married Sidney Ashley Chanler (son of William Astor Chanler) and had issue
- Dona Filipa de Bragança (1905–1990), died unmarried and without issue
- Dom Duarte Nuno, Duke of Braganza (1907–1976), married Dona Maria Francisca of Orléans and Braganza and had issue
- Dona Maria Adelaide de Bragança (1912–2012), married Nicolaas van Uden and had issue

== Ancestry ==
Ancestors of Princess Maria Theresa of Löwenstein-Wertheim-Rosenberg

8. Charles Thomas, Prince of Löwenstein-Wertheim-Rosenberg
4. Constantine, Hereditary Prince of Löwenstein-Wertheim-Rosenberg
9. Countess Sophie of Windisch-Graetz
2. Charles, Prince of Löwenstein-Wertheim-Rosenberg
10. Karl Ludwig, Prince of Hohenlohe-Langenburg
5. Princess Agnes of Hohenlohe-Langenburg
11. Countess Amalie Henriette of Solms-Baruth
1. Princess Maria Theresa of Löwenstein-Wertheim-Rosenberg
12. Johann I Josef, Prince of Liechtenstein
6. Alois II, Prince of Liechtenstein
13. Landgravine Josefa of Fürstenberg-Weitra
3. Princess Sophie of Liechtenstein
14. Count Franz de Paula Joseph Kinsky of Wchinitz and Tettau
7. Countess Franziska Kinsky of Wchinitz and Tettau
15. Countess Therese of Wrbna and Freudenthal

== Bibliography ==
- Louda, Jiřı́ (1999). Lines of Succession. Little, Brown and Company. ISBN 9781856054690 – via Internet Archive.
- Nemec, Norbert (2020). Erzherzogin Maria Annunziata (1876-1961): die unbekannte Nichte Kaiser Franz Josephs I [Archduchess Maria Annunziata (1876-1961) : the unknown niece of Emperor Franz Joseph I] (in German). Böhlau Verlag Vienna. ISBN 9783205784562 – via Google Books.

Princess Maria Theresa of Löwenstein-Wertheim-Rosenberg House of Löwenstein-Wertheim-Rosenberg Born: 4 January 1870 Died: 17 January 1935
Titles in pretence
| Vacant Title last held by Elisabeth of Thurn and Taxis | — TITULAR — Queen consort of Portugal and the Algarves (Miguelist line); 8 November 1893 – 31 July 1920 | Vacant Title next held by Maria Francisca of Orléans-Braganza |
