= Infanta Adelgundes, Duchess of Guimarães =

Portuguese infanta (1858–1946)

Infanta Adelgundes
- Countess of Bardi; Duchess of Guimarães
- Born: 10 November 1858; Bronnbach, Wertheim, Germany
- Died: 15 April 1946 (aged 87); Gunten, Bern, Switzerland
- Spouse: Prince Henry, Count of Bardi (m. 1876; died 1905)
Names
- Portuguese: Adelgundes de Jesus Maria Francisca de Assis e de Paula Adelaide Eulália Leopoldina Carlota Micaela Rafaela Gabriela Gonzaga Inês Isabel Avelina Ana Estanislau Sofia Bernardina
- House: Braganza
- Father: Miguel I of Portugal
- Mother: Adelaide of Löwenstein-Wertheim-Rosenberg

Infanta Adelgundes, Duchess of Guimarães (10 November 1858 – 15 April 1946) was the fifth child and fourth daughter of Miguel of Portugal and his wife Adelaide of Löwenstein-Wertheim-Rosenberg. A member of the House of Braganza by birth, Adelgundes became a member of the House of Bourbon-Parma through her marriage to Prince Henry of Bourbon-Parma, Count of Bardi. She was also the Regent of the Monarchic Representation of Portugal and for that reason assumed the title of Duchess of Guimarães, usually reserved for the Head of the House.

== Early life ==
Adelgundes de Jesus Maria Francisca de Assis e de Paula Adelaide Eulália Leopoldina Carlota Micaela Rafaela Gabriela Gonzaga Inês Isabel Avelina Ana Estanislau Sofia Bernardina, Infanta de Portugal, Duquesa de Guimarães, was born in Bronnbach, Wertheim, Germany. Her father died on November 14, 1866, a few days after her eighth birthday, and Adelgundes and her siblings were educated in a Catholic and conservative environment by their mother. Her maternal uncle, Prince Carl zu Löwenstein-Wertheim-Rosenberg, was like a second father to the children. Out of all her sisters, she was the only fair-haired one.

== Marriage ==
Adelgundes married Prince Henry of Bourbon-Parma, Count of Bardi, fourth child and youngest son of Charles III, Duke of Parma and his wife Princess Louise Marie Thérèse of France, on 15 October 1876 in Salzburg, Austria-Hungary. Her younger sister, Maria Antónia, married with Henry's widowed brother, Robert I, Duke of Parma. Henry, who was 25 years old, had been previously married to Princess Luisa Immacolata of the Two Sicilies, who had died eight months after their marriage at the age of 19 in 1874. Henry had taken part in the Carlist war and fought in the Battle of Lacar. War wounds turned him into an invalid.

Their union produced no issue, as her nine pregnancies all ended in miscarriages. The failed pregnancies, the last of which she suffered in 1890, were a source of great grief to the couple. They divided their time between the Castle of Seebenstein in Austria and the Ca' Vendramin Calergi in Venice. After almost 30 years of marriage, Adelgundes became a widow in 1905. She was close to her many nephews and nieces, particularly Grand Duchess Marie-Adélaïde of Luxembourg, from the time of her abdication to her early death.. The composer, Richard Wagner died of a heart attack at the age of 69 on 13 February 1883 at Ca' Vendramin Calergi, a 16th-century palazzo on the Grand Canal as a guest of Prince Henry, Count of Bardi and Infanta Adelgundes.

== Regent-in-absentia ==
Between 1920 and 1928, Adelgundes acted as the regent-in-absentia on behalf of her nephew and Miguelist claimant to the Portuguese throne, Duarte Nuno, Duke of Braganza, who was only twelve years old when his father Miguel Januário, Duke of Braganza renounced his claim to the throne in his favor. At the beginning of her regency in 1920, Adelgundes assumed the title of Duchess of Guimarães. In 1921 she authored a manifesto outlining the House of Braganza's goals for the restoration of the Portuguese monarchy. During her regency, the ex-King Manuel II of Portugal agreed that owing to an heir, the rights of succession could pass to Duarte Nuno (although Duarte Nuno's grandfather Miguel I of Portugal was excluded from the throne and the Miguelist line deprived of its dynastic rights of succession). But Infanta Adelgundes failing to get an agreement mentioning the reestablishment of a traditional monarchy, the Integralists withheld their support to an accord, and in September 1925, Adelgundes, in a letter to King Manuel, repudiated the incomplete agreement. Since any pact resolved the issue of succession (former Dover Pact and Paris Pact having been both repudiated) and without known documents, there was no direct heir to the defunct throne, but at the death of King Manuel, however, the monarchist Integralismo Lusitano movement acclaimed Duarte Nuno, Duke of Braganza as King of Portugal. Duarte Nuno lived with Adelgundes at Seebenstein until the German occupation of Austria when the whole family relocated to Bern, Switzerland, where she died in Gunten on 15 April 1946 at age 87.

== Ancestry ==
Ancestors of Infanta Adelgundes, Duchess of Guimarães

8. Peter III of Portugal
4. John VI of Portugal and Brazil
9. Maria I of Portugal and Brazil
2. Miguel I of Portugal
10. Charles IV of Spain
5. Infanta Carlota Joaquina of Spain
11. Princess Maria Luisa of Parma
1. Infanta Aldegundes, Duchess of Guimarães
12. Charles Thomas, Prince of Löwenstein-Wertheim-Rosenberg
6. Constantine, Hereditary Prince of Löwenstein-Wertheim-Rosenberg
13. Countess Sophie of Windisch-Graetz
3. Princess Adelaide of Löwenstein-Wertheim-Rosenberg
14. Karl Ludwig, Prince of Hohenlohe-Langenburg
7. Princess Agnes of Hohenlohe-Langenburg
15. Countess Amalie Henriette of Solms-Baruth

== Bibliography ==
- William Mead Lalor, Six Braganza Sisters, in Royalty History Digest.
- Newman, Ernest (1976). The Life of Richard Wagner (4 vols.). Cambridge: Cambridge University Press.
