= Maria Adelaide de Bragança =

Portuguese princess (1912–2012)

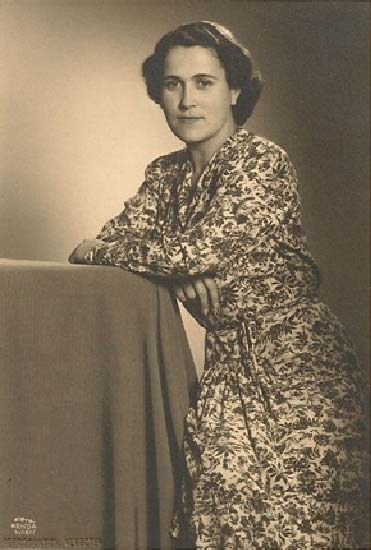
- Born: 31 January 1912; Saint-Jean-de-Luz, Third French Republic
- Died: 24 February 2012 (aged 100); Lisbon, Portugal
- Spouse: Dr. Nicolaas van Uden (m. 1945; died 1991)
- Issue: Adriano Sérgio de Bragança van Uden; Nuno Miguel de Bragança van Uden; Francisco Xavier Damiano de Bragança van Uden; Filipa Teodora de Bragança van Uden; Miguel Inácio de Bragança van Uden; Maria Teresa de Bragança van Uden
Names
- Maria Adelaide Manuela Amélia Micaela Rafaela
- House: Braganza
- Father: Miguel Januário, Duke of Braganza
- Mother: Princess Maria Theresa of Löwenstein

Infanta Maria Adelaide of Portugal, Princess of Braganza GOM (31 January 1912 – 24 February 2012) was a member of the royal house of Braganza, daughter of Miguel Januário, Duke of Braganza and Princess Maria Theresa of Löwenstein.

== Life ==
Princess Maria Adelaide was born in Saint-Jean-de-Luz, France. Her godparents were King Manuel II, the last reigning king of Portugal (deposed in 1910), and his mother Queen Amélie. She was educated at the Sacre Coeur College in Riedenburg, Germany.

She was married in Vienna, 13 October 1945, to Dr. Nicolaas van Uden (Venlo, 5 March 1921 – Lisbon, 5 February 1991) who was Dutch and who became a naturalized Portuguese citizen in 1975. Son of Adrian van Uden (Gerwen, 7 May 1893 – 24 December 1959) and wife Cornelia Antonia Baaijeens (Gorinchem, 7 September 1897 – 15 June 1979), daughter of Nicolaas Baaijeens and wife Helena Dam, Nicolaas van Uden was a medical biochemist and a great scientific authority in the field of yeast development.

Princess Maria Adelaide lived in Vienna, Austria, working as a nurse and social assistant. During World War II, when there were bombardments, she travelled at night to the place to provide aid to the victims. She was part of the Nazi resistance movement, and the Gestapo sentenced her to death. The Portuguese President of the Council of Ministers, António de Oliveira Salazar intervened with the Germans, claiming that Princess Maria Adelaide was a national heritage. This intervention of the Portuguese diplomacy resulted in the release and her immediate deportation, after which she settled in Switzerland. It was there that her brother Dom Duarte Nuno, Duke of Braganza lived with his wife Francisca. After the war, the family finally returned to Austria.

In 1949, Princess Maria Adelaide settled in Portugal. Meanwhile, her husband graduated in medicine from the University of Vienna and specialized in diseases of the skin. But when Dr. Nicolaas van Uden arrived in Portugal his qualifications were not recognised as equivalent to the Portuguese ones, and therefore he could not practice medicine. As there was no other solution, he went to work for a small research laboratory at the Faculty of Science and stayed there for several years, until the opportunity to work in partnership with the Calouste Gulbenkian Foundation arose. Due to such a collaboration the Gulbenkian Science Institute was born and it promotes scientific research in various areas since the 1950s to date.

The van Uden family originally lived in the Quinta do Carmo, in Almada. Princess Maria Adelaide began working as a social assistant in some initiatives, because that area of Trafaria in Monte da Caparica, was very poor. She developed an intensive career, especially in the area whereby newborn poor or orphaned children were collected and then taken to the D. Nunes Alvares Pereira Foundation, of which she was President.

Her nephew D. Duarte Pio, Duke of Braganza, is the present head of the House of Braganza and, therefore, a claimant to the former Portuguese throne. She was the last surviving grandchild of Miguel I of Portugal and last surviving great-grandchild of John VI of Portugal.

== Issue ==
Name	Birth	Notes
Adriano Sérgio de Bragança van Uden	9 April 1946 (age 80)	Married Maria de Jesus de Saldanha de Sousa e Menezes
Nuno Miguel de Bragança van Uden	2 September 1947 (age 79)	Married Maria do Rosário Cayolla Bonneville
Francisco Xavier Damiano de Bragança van Uden	8 September 1949 (age 77)	Married Maria Teresa Henriques Gil
Filipa Teodora de Bragança van Uden	22 June 1951 (age 75)	Married António Manuel d'Atouguia da Rocha Fontes
Miguel Inácio de Bragança van Uden	31 July 1953 (age 73)	Married Maria do Carmo Leão Ponce Dentinho
Maria Teresa de Bragança van Uden	24 June 1956 (age 70)	Married João Ricardo da Câmara Chaves

== Honours ==
- (Kingdom of Portugal) Portuguese Royal Family: Dame Grand Cross of the Order of Saint Isabel
- Portuguese Republic: Grand Officer of the Order of Merit (31 January 2012)

== Bibliography ==
- Ochoa, Raquel, A Infanta Rebelde, Oficina do Livro, 2011.
