= Miguelist =

Denotes support for Miguel I's claim to the Portuguese throne

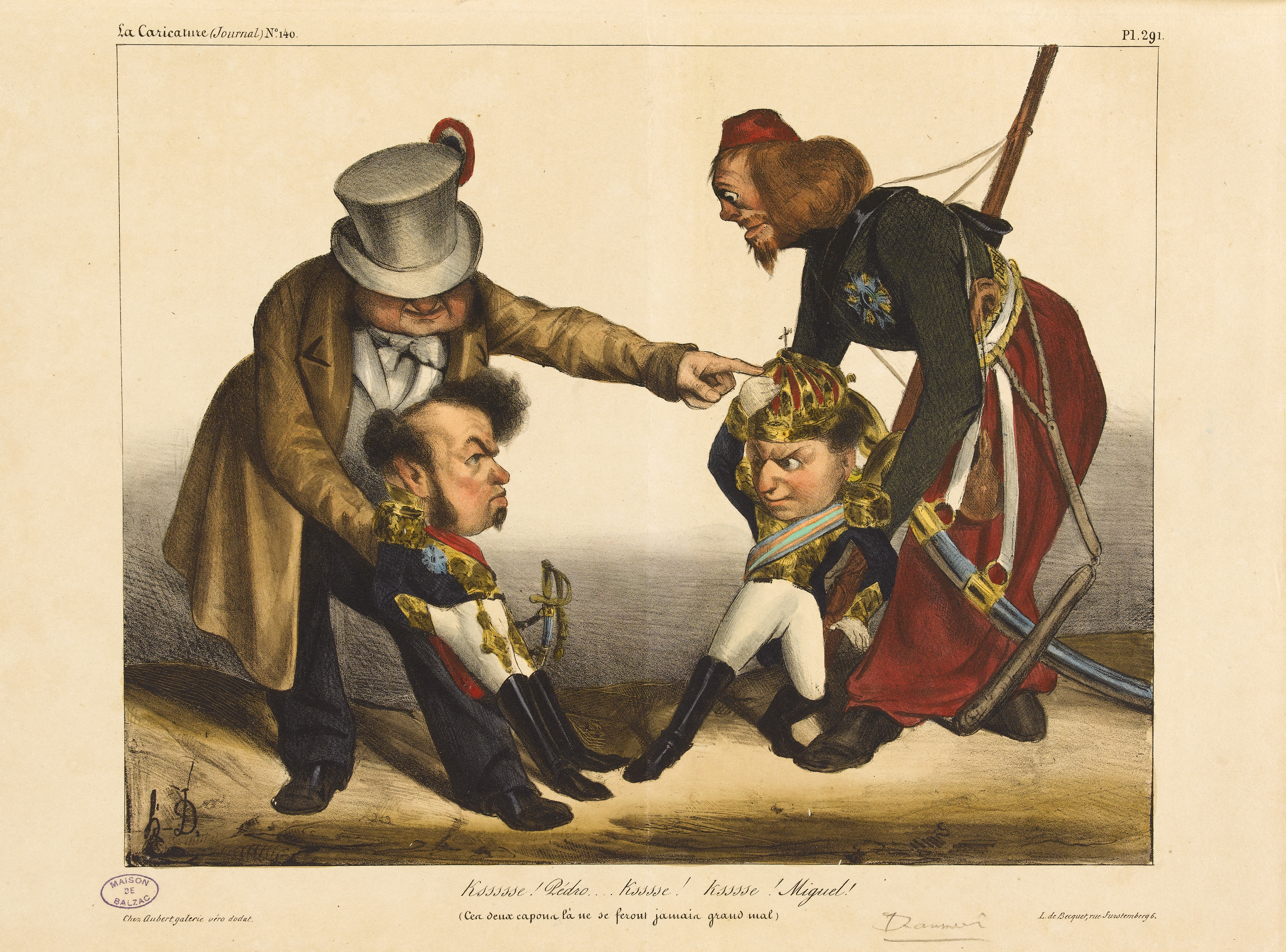
A period cartoon, showing the conflict between the Two Brothers, as children, supported and instigated, respectively, by the French King Louis Philippe I, representing the liberal side, and Czar Nicholas I of Russia, representing the anti-liberalist Holy Alliance

In the history of Portugal, a Miguelist or Miguelite (Portuguese: Miguelista) is a supporter of the legitimacy of the king Miguel I of Portugal and his descendants.

Miguel was regent for his niece Queen Maria II of Portugal, and potential royal consort. However, he claimed the Portuguese throne in his own right on the grounds that the "Fundamental Laws of the Kingdom" deprived his elder brother Pedro IV of his right to reign (and of any right of Pedro's daughter to inherit the kingdom from her father) when Pedro became sovereign of the former Portuguese colony of Brazil and launched war on Portugal to oust Miguel as a usurper.

This overall led to a political crisis, during which many people were killed, imprisoned, persecuted or sent into exile, culminating in the Portuguese Liberal Wars between authoritarian Miguelists (led by Miguel) and progressive Constitutionalists (led by Pedro).

In the end, Miguel was forced from the throne and lived the last 32 years of his life in exile.

Miguelism is based not only on the premise that Miguel and his line have legitimate right to the Portuguese throne, but also on defense of the principles of a monarchy based in Catholic values and in the power of the king above the Constitution, in contrast to the Enlightenment values.

== Miguelist Braganzas ==
King Miguel I was exiled following the Convention of Evora-Monte (1834), which put an end to the Liberal Wars. The throne was retaken by his niece, Queen Maria II, and a liberal regime was installed.

In exile, the former king married a wealthy Bavarian princess, Adelaide of Löwenstein-Wertheim-Rosenberg. This marriage was the origin of the new Miguelist branch of the Braganzas and their descendants include not only the current claimant to the Portuguese crown, as well as the monarchs of Belgium, Luxembourg, Liechtenstein, and other claimants to former European monarchies (Habsburg, Habsburg-Este, Savoy, Wittelsbach, Bourbon-Parma, Mecklenburg-Strelitz, Karađorđević).

Finally, this Miguelist branch became the sole Braganza representative when King Manuel II of Portugal (the last male Braganza from the senior liberal branch) died without issue, leaving his Miguelist cousin Duarte Nuno as his closest legitimate Portuguese relative. Also Maria Pia of Saxe-Coburg and Gotha Braganza, who claimed to be the illegitimate daughter of King Carlos I of Portugal, claimed the right to the titles of Duchess of Braganza and to be the rightful Queen of Portugal.

== Miguelist claimants to the throne ==
Claimant	Portrait	Birth	Marriages	Death
Miguel I 1834–1866		26 October 1802, Lisbon; Son of João VI and Carlota Joaquina of Spain	Adelaide of Löwenstein-Wertheim-Rosenberg; 24 September 1851; 7 children	14 November 1866; Esselbach aged 64
Miguel, Duke of Braganza; 1866–1920		19 September 1853, Kleinheubach; Son of Miguel I and Adelaide of Löwenstein-Wertheim-Rosenberg	Elisabeth of Thurn and Taxis; 17 October 1877; 3 children Maria Theresa of Löwenstein-Wertheim-Rosenberg; 8 November 1893; 8 children	11 October 1927; Seebenstein aged 74
Duarte Nuno, Duke of Braganza; 1920–1932 (Miguelist claimant); 1932–1976 (Royalist claimant)		23 September 1907, Seebenstein; Son of Miguel, Duke of Braganza and Maria Theresa of Löwenstein-Wertheim-Rosenberg	Maria Francisca of Orléans-Braganza; 15 October 1942; 3 children	24 December 1976; Lagoa aged 69
Duarte Pio, Duke of Braganza; 1976–present		15 May 1945; Bern; Son of Duarte Nuno, Duke of Braganza and Maria Francisca of Orléans-Braganza	Isabel de Herédia; 13 May 1995; 3 children	

== Genealogical chart ==
On the family tree below, the Miguelist branch is clearly identified on the right-hand side while the Liberal Branch from Maria II is on the left with the Brazilian Imperial branch descending from her brother Pedro II in the middle. In 1942 the Miguelist pretender Duarte Nuno of Braganza married Maria Francisca of Orléans-Braganza, a great-granddaughter of Pedro II of Brazil. The current pretender Duarte Pio, Duke of Braganza, is therefore descended from both of the feuding brothers Pedro IV of Portugal and Miguel I of Portugal.

John VI [1767–1826] King of the United Kingdom of Portugal, Brazil & the Algarves 1816–22; King of Portugal & the Algarves 1822–26; Titular Emperor of Brazil 1825–26
Pedro I of Brazil and IV of Portugal [1798–1834] Emp. of Brazil 1822–31; King of Portugal 1826	Miguel I [1802–1866] Regent (to his niece) 1828; King of Portugal 1828–34
Maria II [1819–1853] Queen of Portugal; 1826–28, 1834–53	Fernando II [1816–1885] Prince of Saxe-Coburg and Gotha; Prince Consort 1836–37; King Consort 1837–53	Pedro II [1825–1891] Emp. of Brazil 1831–89; Imperial claimant 1889-91 deposed (1889)
Pedro V [1837–1861] King of Portugal 1853–61	Luis I [1838–1889] King of Portugal 1861–89	Isabel, Princess Imperial [1846-1921] Imperial claimant 1891-1921	Miguel (II) [1853–1927]
Carlos I [1863–1908] King of Portugal 1889–1908	Luís, Prince Imperial [1878-1920]	Pedro de Alcântara [1875-1940] Petrópolis claimant 1921-40 (post mortem only)
Manuel II [1889–1932] last King of Portugal 1908–10 deposed (1910), without issue	Pedro Henrique [1909–1981] Vassouras claimant 1921-81	Pedro Gastão [1913–2007] Petrópolis claimant 1940-2007	Maria Francisca, Duchess of Braganza [1914-1968]	Duarte Nuno [1907–1976]
Brazilian; Imperial family (Vassouras)	Brazilian; Imperial family (Petrópolis)	Duarte Pio [born 1945] Duke of Braganza

== See also ==
- Descendants of Miguel I of Portugal
- Carlism
- Remexido
- Legitimists
- List of movements that dispute the legitimacy of a reigning monarch
