= Raquel Ochoa =

- Born: 21 January 1980 (age 46); Lisbon, Portugal
- Occupations: author, writer
- Writing career
- Notable awards: Prémio Agustina Bessa-Luís (2009)

Raquel Ochoa is a Portuguese author of novels, biographies and travel literature. In 2009 she was awarded the Prémio Agustina Bessa-Luís for the novel "A Casa-Comboio"., the story of an indo-Portuguese family from Damão and the untold history of Portuguese India, which was also translated and published in Italian. In 2023 her novel "Coração-Castelo" was select to the final list of Prémio-Leya.

== Life and career ==
She was born in Lisbon in 1980. and studied law.

Accounts of her travel to several corners of the world are published on her blog www.omundoleseaviajar.blogspot.com, and she is a regular contributor to various newspapers and magazine.

In 2008, she published two books, O Vento dos Outros – an account of her travels in South America and Bana – Uma vida a cantar Cabo Verde, the biography of Bana, a Cape Verdian singer.

In 2011, her fourth book was published, A Infanta Rebelde, a biography of Princess D. Maria Adelaide de Bragança, who was awarded the Order of Merit by the President of the Republic.

Her second novel, Sem Fim à Vista - a viagem, published in September 2012, is the story of a patient with serious heart problems travelling through Singapore, Malaysia, Indonesia, Australia, New Zealand, Hong Kong, Macau, Sri Lanka.

In May 2014, she published Mar Humano, a historical novel reflecting the journalism practised in Portugal today and in the past century, and at the same time joined the disparate themes of human longevity and the impact of science and evolution on human consciousness.

https://www.wook.pt/livro/mar-humano-raquel-ochoa/15767467

July 2015 saw, the publication of As Noivas do Sultão, a historical novel based on a series of true events from 1793 when, caught by a storm in the Atlantic, the ship carrying the family and harem of the Sultan Mohamed III of Morocco arrived in Lisbon.

https://www.wook.pt/livro/as-noivas-do-sultao-raquel-ochoa/16565502

In 2020 published another travel chronicles book "Pés na Terra". https://www.wook.pt/livro/pes-na-terra-raquel-ochoa/24259304

Her last work was published in 2024, Coração-Castelo, a historical novel about a siege in Japan, 1637, remembering the true history of the brave kirishitans, the Japanese Christians in the 17th century. https://www.wook.pt/livro/coracao-castelo-raquel-ochoa/29973039

== Published works ==
- " O Vento dos Outros", travel book, 2008.
- " Bana - Uma vida a cantar Cabo Verde", biography, 2008.
- " A Casa-Comboio", historical novel, 2010
- "A Infanta Rebelde", biographical novel, 2011
- "Sem Fim à Vista-a viagem", a novel, 2012
- "Mar Humano", historical novel, 2014
- "As Noivas do Sultão", historical novel, 2015
- "Manuel Vicente, a Desmontagem do Desconhecido", short biography, 2017
- "Pés na Terra", travel book, 2020

== Prizes ==
- 2008 - Agustina Bessa-Luís literary prize for a first novel, for A Casa Comboio

== Travel ==
A traveller for 16 years, after several journeys across Europe, she left for India and Nepal at 21. She returned, spending several months at a time in the years that followed. Since 2004, she spent long periods travelling in South America. At age 33 she went halfway around the world, visiting Singapore, Malaysia, Indonesia, Australia, New Zealand, Hong Kong and Macau, India, Sri Lanka, Morocco and 2013 travelled across South East Asia. She frequently returns to Cape Verde.

== Teaching ==
Since 2008 she has given creative writing classes to students of all ages.
