= Uden (surname) =

Uden or (usually) Van Uden is a Dutch toponymic surname meaning "(from/of) Uden", a town in North Brabant. Notable people with the surname include:

- Antonius van Uden (1912–2008), Dutch pedagogue and psychologist
- Lucas van Uden (1595–1672), Flemish landscape painter, draughtsman and engraver
- Martin Uden (born 1955), British diplomat
- Roman Van Uden (born 1988), New Zealand cyclist
