= Duarte Nuno, Duke of Braganza =

Duke of Braganza (1907–1976)

Duarte Nuno
- Duke of Braganza
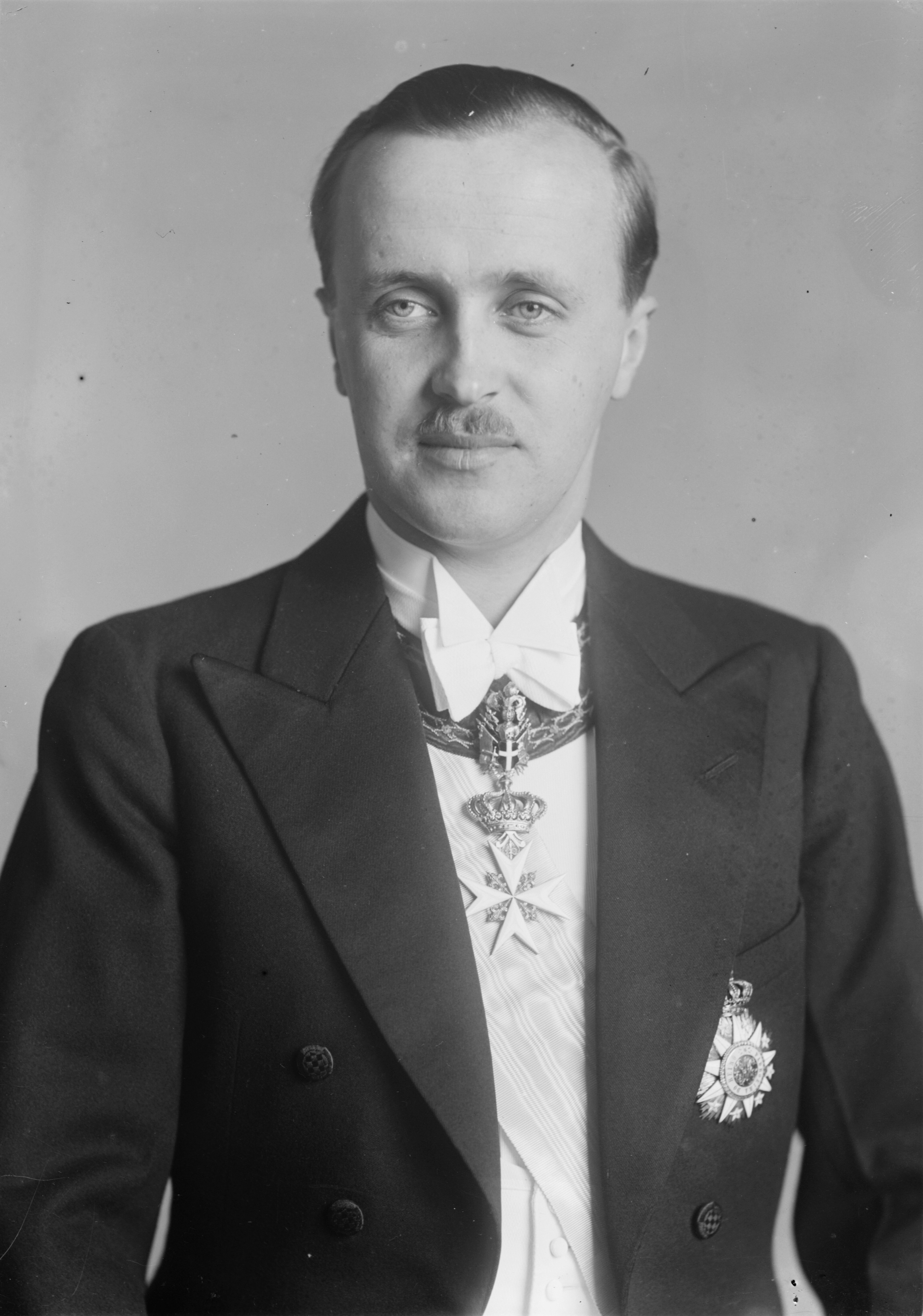
- Duarte Nuno in 1930

Miguelist claimant to the Portuguese throne
- Tenure: 31 July 1920 – 17 April 1922
- Predecessor: Miguel Januário, Duke of Braganza

Head of the House of Braganza
- Tenure: 2 July 1932 – 24 December 1976
- Predecessor: Manuel II
- Successor: Duarte Pio, Duke of Braganza
- Born: 23 September 1907; Seebenstein, Austria
- Died: 24 December 1976 (aged 69); Prazeres, Lisbon, Portugal
- Burial: Augustinian monastery in Vila Viçosa
- Spouse: Princess Maria Francisca of Orléans-Braganza (m. 1942; died 1968)
- Issue details...: Duarte Pio, Duke of Braganza; Miguel Rafael, Duke of Viseu; Henrique Nuno, Duke of Coimbra
Names
- Duarte Nuno Fernando Maria Miguel Gabriel Rafael Francisco Xavier Raimundo António
- House: Braganza
- Father: Miguel Januário, Duke of Braganza
- Mother: Princess Maria Theresa of Löwenstein-Wertheim-Rosenberg
- Religion: Roman Catholic

Dom Duarte Nuno, Duke of Braganza (23 September 1907 – 24 December 1976) was the claimant to the defunct Portuguese throne, as both the Miguelist successor of his father, Miguel Januário, Duke of Braganza, and later as the head of the only Brigantine house, after the death of the last ruling Braganza, King Manuel II of Portugal. In 1952, when the Portuguese Laws of Banishment were repealed (27 May 1950), the Duke moved his family to Portugal, thus returning the Miguelist Braganzas to their homeland and becoming the first of the former Portuguese royal dynasty to live in Portugal since the abolition of the monarchy in 1910.

Once established in Portugal, the Duke was granted a pension and residence by the Fundação da Casa de Bragança. The organization has owned and managed all the private assets of the House of Braganza, since the death of King Manuel II, in 1932. Duarte Nuno spent the rest of his life attempting, without success, the restoration of all Brigantine assets to his family and recreating the image of the Miguelist Braganzas in Portuguese society, all under the goal of the restoration of the Portuguese monarchy, under the Braganzas.

In 1942, the Duarte Nuno married Princess Maria Francisca of Orléans-Braganza, daughter of Pedro de Alcântara, Prince of Grão-Pará. Their marriage reconciled two branches of the House of Braganza, the Portuguese and Brazilian Brigantine houses, which had been estranged since 1828, when the War of Two Brothers was waged between King-Emperor Pedro IV & I, founder of the Liberal Braganzas, and King Miguel I, founder of the Miguelist Braganzas. The couple had three sons, the eldest of whom is Duarte Pio de Bragança, the current pretender to the defunct Portuguese throne.

== Early life ==
Duarte Nuno Fernando Maria Miguel Gabriel Rafael Francisco Xavier Raimundo António was born on 23 September 1907 at Seebenstein Castle in Austria-Hungary, the son of Miguel Januário, Duke of Braganza and of his second wife, Princess Maria Theresa of Löwenstein-Wertheim-Rosenberg. Duarte Nuno had two older half-brothers, one older half-sister and eight sisters.

His paternal grandparents were Miguel I of Portugal and Princess Adelaide of Löwenstein-Wertheim-Rosenberg. His maternal grandparents were Charles, Prince of Löwenstein-Wertheim-Rosenberg, and Princess Sophie of Liechtenstein.

Duarte Nuno's father was the Miguelist claimant to the throne of Portugal who opposed his cousins, the reigning line of the House of Braganza-Saxe-Coburg and Gotha descended from Queen Maria II. Duarte Nuno's family had been disinherited and banished by Maria II for rebellion.

The day after his birth, Duarte Nuno was baptised at Seebenstein. His godparents were his aunt the Infanta Aldegundes, Duchess of Guimarães and the husband of another aunt, the Infante Alfonso Carlos, Duke of San Jaime (both of whom were represented by proxies).

=== Succession as Miguelist claimant ===
Duarte Nuno's second brother, Prince Francis Joseph of Braganza, died in 1919, and on 21 July 1920 his eldest brother, Prince Miguel, Duke of Viseu, renounced his succession rights. Ten days later on 31 July 1920 Duarte Nuno's father, Miguel Januário, abdicated his claim to the Portuguese throne in favour of Duarte Nuno.

== Succession as Constitutional claimant ==
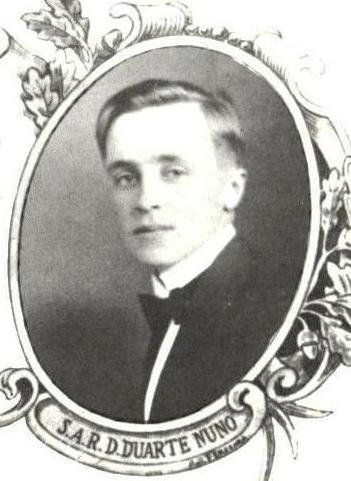
Portrait of the Duke in the Pact of Paris, which he signed with King Manuel II.

After the death of his uncle Afonso in 1920, ex-King Manuel II had no close relatives who could claim the throne according to the Constitutional Charter of 1826 (the constitution in force from 1842 until the overthrow of the monarchy in 1910). The conflict between the Miguelist line and the Braganza-Saxe-Coburg and Gotha's was not just about which person should be sovereign; it was also about how much power the sovereign should have. The Miguelists upheld Portugal's tradition of autocratic absolutism, while the Braganza-Saxe-Coburg and Gotha's adhered to constitutional monarchy.

In 1912, Duarte Nuno's father, Miguel Januário, met with Manuel II to try to come to some agreement so that there would not be two claimants to the Portuguese throne, both living in exile. Their representatives allegedly signed the Pact of Dover by which Miguel Januário recognised Manuel as king, while Manuel recognised the succession rights of Duarte Nuno should Manuel and his uncle Afonso die without children.

On 17 April 1922 a second agreement called the Pact of Paris was signed by the representatives of Duarte Nuno and Manuel in which Manuel agreed that the Cortes should select his heir if he died without descendants, while Duarte Nuno agreed to ask and recommend that his followers accept Manuel as king-in-exile.

Strictly speaking the Pact of Dover and the Pact of Paris were private agreements, legally unenforceable. Nor did King Manuel agree to any provision in the latter pact which contravened Portugal's last monarchist constitution. But the agreements were important steps in reconciling the Miguelist and the Braganza-Saxe-Coburg branches of Portugal's royal family, and helped move the supporters of each toward a united monarchist movement.

In 1927, Duarte Nuno's father died. On 2 July 1932 Manuel II died. Henceforth, the majority of monarchists, both Miguelist and constitutional, supported Duarte Nuno as claimant to the Portuguese throne. João António de Azevedo Coutinho, the head of Causa Monárquica and Manuel II's lieutenant while he was in exile, published a declaration in support of Duarte Nuno. Later Duarte Nuno was received in audience in Paris by Manuel's mother, Queen Amélia.

While Duarte Nuno was accepted by most monarchists, there were some constitutionalists who continued to contest his claim. Duarte Nuno was undisputed as the legal heir of his grandfather, Miguel I, but there were doubts about whether he was the legal heir of the last reigning king of Portugal, Manuel II. Articles 87 and 88 of the Constitutional Charter of 1826, in force when the monarchy was overthrown, stated that the throne passed first to the descendants of Queen Maria II (from whom Duarte Nuno was not descended), and only when they were extinct to collateral heirs. Maria II had living descendants in 1932, but none of these had Portuguese nationality. Article 89 of the 1826 Charter stipulated that "no foreigner may succeed to the crown of the kingdom of Portugal".

There was also some doubt about Duarte Nuno's nationality: Duarte Nuno's grandfather, D. Miguel I, had been sent into exile by the law of 19 December 1834, and neither Duarte Nuno nor his father were born in Portugal. Furthermore, the article 8 of the 1826 Charter stated that Portuguese citizenship is lost "by those who are banished by sentence". The fact that Duarte Nuno and his father had not been born in Portugal and that their family had been banished from Portugal left it unclear whether their branch's Portuguese citizenship had been preserved uninterruptedly. However, Dom Duarte's line was banished by law (of the Portuguese Cortes) rather than by judicial sentence (that, in addition, might have been changed by a new judicial sentence); but the 1838 Constitution, in force at the time of the banishment, established D. Miguel I's deprivation of citizenship, and consequently the loss of his hereditary rights to the throne of Portugal, as well as reinforced this 'ad hoc' law of exile, making it almost irrevocable. But when the Constitutional Charter of 1826 was re-instated in 1842, it cancelled the 1838 Constitution and its charter's clause depriving Miguel I and his heirs of succession rights as dynasts. Moreover, their banishment had not, however, been stipulated in that charter, but in the separate law of exile that was not repealed until 1950.

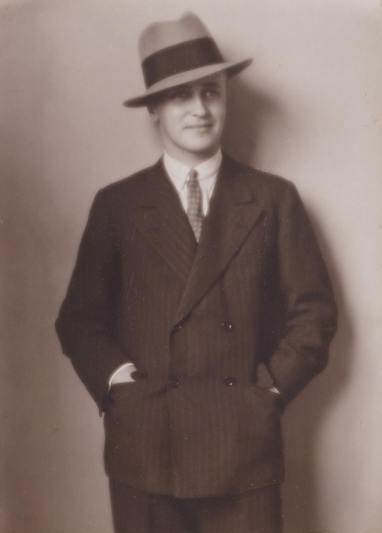
Duarte Nuno in 1930

A minority of monarchists considered a candidate other than Duarte Nuno. Manuel's genealogical heir at his death in 1932 was ex-Crown Prince George of Saxony (a great-grandson of Maria II), but he was not Portuguese; he was also a Catholic priest. George's siblings have descendants living, but none is known to have had Portuguese citizenship.

The genealogical heir of Maria II's younger brother Emperor Pedro II of Brazil was his great-grandson Prince Pedro Gastão of Orléans-Braganza; he too was not Portuguese, but the fact that he was Brazilian and therefore imbued with Portuguese culture made him a somewhat attractive candidate.

The closest heir who was undoubtedly Portuguese was Constança Berquó de Mendonça, 4th Duchess of Loulé (a great-great-granddaughter of King John VI), but her branch of the family put forth no claim at that time, nor did King Manuel II ever consider it. Many scholars claim the Dukes of Loulé do not have rights to the throne since the secret marriage of the Infanta Ana de Jesus Maria with the Marquis of Loulé (celebrated in December 1827, in a private ceremony, in the chapel of the Royal Ajuda Palace) had not been authorised by either the Cortes nor by the members of the Regency Council, although it had been approved by the Infanta-Regent herself – on behalf of the minor queen Maria II – and that nothing in Portugal's law required a cadet infanta to obtain royal or Cortes's permission to marry.

A woman calling herself Maria Pia de Saxe-Coburgo e Bragança claimed to be the bastard daughter of King Carlos I. She also claimed to have been recognised by the King as possessing succession rights. Her supporters played upon the traditional rivalry between the Miguelist line and the Braganza-Saxe-Coburg and Gotha line to advance her cause.

== Education ==
Duarte Nuno's first tutors were two Portuguese ladies, Maria Luisa Castelo and Maria das Dores de Sousa Prego. Later he was taught by the Benedictine monk Frei Estevao from the monastery of Cucujães. Duarte Nuno attended school at the Abbey of Ettal in Bavaria and the Abbey of Clairvaux in France and then completed his secondary education in Regensburg. He received a degree in agricultural sciences from the University of Toulouse.

== Marriage ==
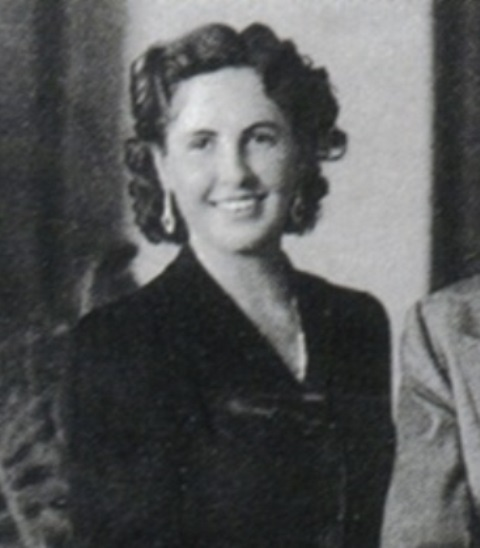
Duarte Nuno's wife, Maria Francisca of Orléans-Braganza.

On 15 October 1942, in the Cathedral of Petrópolis in Brazil, Duarte Nuno married Princess Maria Francisca of Orléans-Braganza (8 September 1914 – 15 January 1968), daughter of Pedro de Alcântara, Prince of Grão-Pará. The marriage united two lines of the Portuguese royal family because Maria Francisca was the great-granddaughter of Pedro II of Brazil, the younger brother of Queen Maria II.

== Return to Portugal ==
On 27 May 1950 the National Assembly repealed the laws of exile of 19 December 1834 and 15 October 1910. Duarte Nuno, however, did not return to Portugal until 1952 on account of a car accident in Thionville in which he was seriously injured. He was presented with a residence in Portugal by the Fundação Casa de Bragança.

Portuguese dictator António de Oliveira Salazar thought about restoring the monarchy in 1951, after the death of President Óscar Carmona, but he chose instead to hold the 1951 presidential election and maintain the post of President of Portugal as the country's head of state, as it had appeared in the republican Constitution of 1933.

In 1974, Duarte Nuno handed over his residence, the Palácio de São Marcos, to the University of Coimbra. From then until his death two years later, he lived in southern Portugal with his unmarried sister, Princess Filippa of Braganza. American author Walter J. P. Curley interviewed Duarte Nuno near the end of his life, and his book Monarchs in Waiting describes Duarte Nuno as suffering from "nervous depression" since the death of his wife in 1968. In his obituary, the New York Times wrote that "He had suffered from an unknown illness for a number of years and had requested before his death that an autopsy be performed “in the interest of science,” according to a member of his family."

Duarte Nuno was Grand Master of the Order of the Immaculate Conception of Vila Viçosa and Sovereign of the Order of Saint Isabel. He was a Bailiff Grand Cross of Honour and Devotion of the Sovereign Military Order of Malta and a Knight of the (Austrian) Order of the Golden Fleece.

Duarte Nuno is buried in the Augustinian monastery in Vila Viçosa, the traditional burial place of the Dukes of Braganza.

== Dynastic orders ==
- Knight Grand Cross of Justice of the Calabrian Two Sicilian Order of Saint George (Royal Family of the Two Sicilies)

== Genealogy ==
=== Ancestry ===
Ancestors of Duarte Nuno, Duke of Braganza

8. John VI of Portugal, Brazil and the Algarves
4. Miguel I of Portugal
9. Infanta Carlota Joaquina of Spain
2. Miguel Januário, Duke of Braganza
10. Constantine, Hereditary Prince of Löwenstein-Wertheim-Rosenberg
5. Princess Adelaide of Löwenstein-Wertheim-Rosenberg
11. Princess Agnes of Hohenlohe-Langenburg
1. Duarte Nuno, Duke of Braganza
12. Constantine, Hereditary Prince of Löwenstein-Wertheim-Rosenberg (= 10)
6. Charles, Prince of Löwenstein-Wertheim-Rosenberg
13. Princess Agnes of Hohenlohe-Langenburg (= 11)
3. Princess Maria Theresa of Löwenstein-Wertheim-Rosenberg
14. Aloys II, Prince of Liechtenstein
7. Princess Sophie of Liechtenstein
15. Countess Franziska Kinsky of Wchinitz and Tettau

=== Issue ===
Name	Portrait	Birth	Death	Notes
By Princess Maria Francisca of Orléans-Braganza (8 September 1914 – 15 January 1968; married 13 October 1942)
Duarte Pio, Duke of Braganza		15 May 1945		24th Duke of Braganza; pretender to the throne
Infante Miguel, Duke of Viseu		3 December 1946		8th Duke of Viseu, Infante of Portugal
Infante Henrique, Duke of Coimbra		6 November 1949	14 February 2017	4th Duke of Coimbra, Infante of Portugal

Duarte Nuno, Duke of Braganza House of Braganza Cadet branch of the House of Aviz Born: 23 September 1907 Died: 24 December 1976
Portuguese nobility
Preceded by Miguel	Duke of Braganza; 31 July 1920 – 24 December 1976	Succeeded by Duarte Pio
Titles in pretence
Preceded by Miguel II	— TITULAR — King of Portugal and the Algarves; Miguelist line 31 July 1920 – 17 April 1922; Reason for succession failure: Grandfather deposed in 1834	Succeeded by Claim ended
Preceded by King Manuel II	— TITULAR — King of Portugal and the Algarves; 2 July 1932 – 24 December 1976; Reason for succession failure: Monarchy abolished in 1910	Succeeded by Duarte Pio
