= Adelaide of Löwenstein-Wertheim-Rosenberg =

Wife of Miguel I of Portugal (1831–1909)

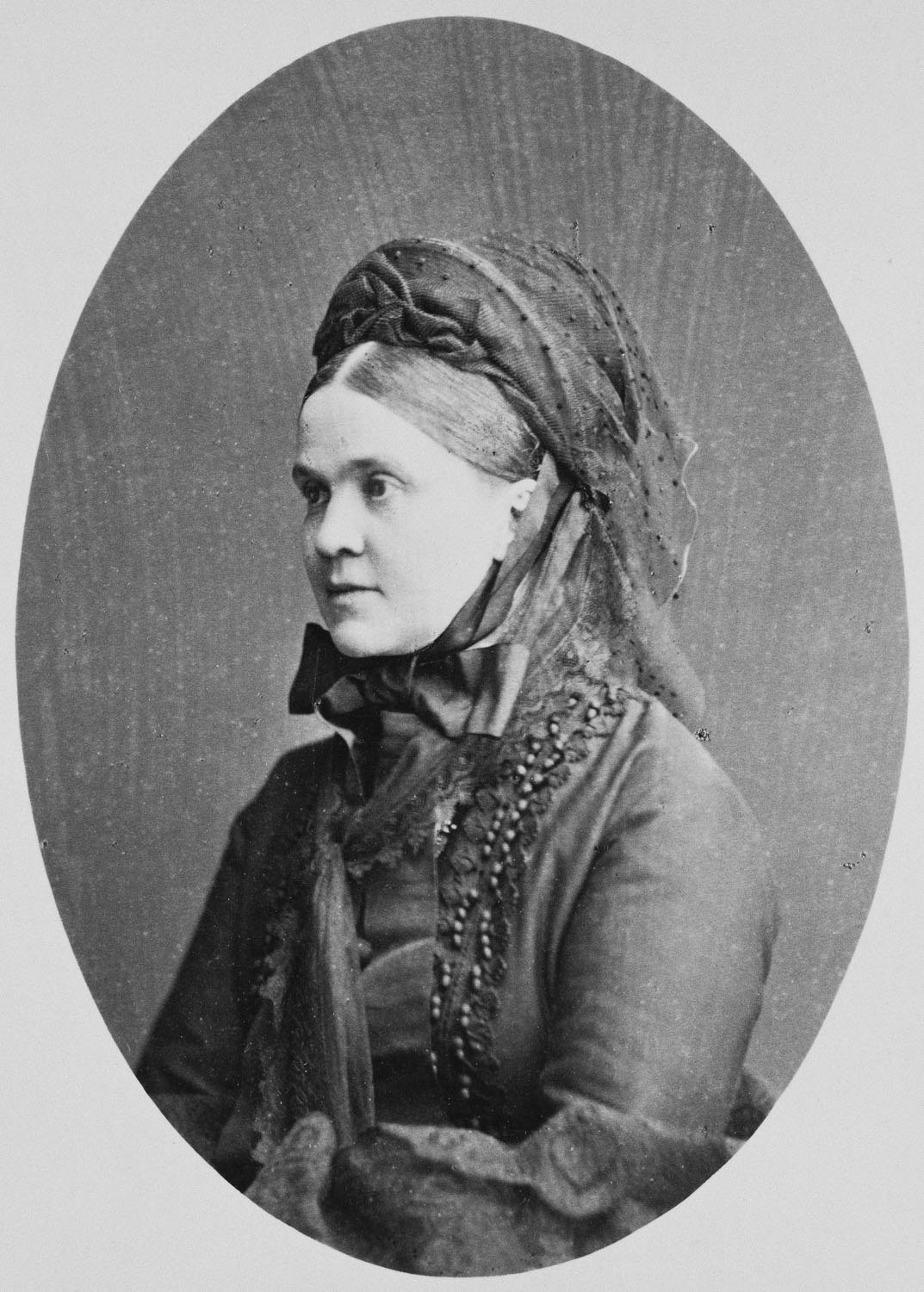
- Portrait of Duchess Adelaide as a widow (1885)
- Born: 3 April 1831; Kleinheubach, Kingdom of Bavaria, German Confederation
- Died: 16 December 1909 (aged 78); Ryde, Isle of Wight, United Kingdom
- Burial: 1967; Pantheon of the Braganças, Lisbon, Portugal
- Spouse: Miguel I of Portugal (m. 1851; died 1866)
- Issue: Infanta Maria das Neves, Duchess of San Jaime; Miguel Januário, Duke of Braganza; Maria Teresa, Archduchess of Austria; Maria José, Duchess in Bavaria; Infanta Adelgundes, Duchess of Guimarães; Maria Ana, Grand Duchess of Luxembourg; Maria Antónia, Duchess of Parma
Names
- German: Sophie Amelie Adelheid Louise Johanne Leopoldine
- House: Löwenstein-Wertheim-Rosenberg
- Father: Constantine, Hereditary Prince of Löwenstein
- Mother: Princess Agnes of Hohenlohe-Langenburg

Adelaide of Löwenstein-Wertheim-Rosenberg (in the original German and more fully, Sophie Amalie Adelheid Luise Johanne Leopoldine, 3 April 1831 – 16 December 1909) was the wife of the deposed king Miguel I of Portugal. As a widow, she secured advantageous marriages for their six daughters.

== Early life ==
Princess Adelaide Sofia Amelia of Löwenstein-Wertheim-Rosenberg was born in Kleinheubach, near Miltenberg, Bavaria, on 3 April 1831, Easter Sunday. She was a daughter of Constantine, Hereditary Prince of Löwenstein (1802–1838), and his wife, Princess Agnes of Hohenlohe-Langenburg. She was known as Ada to her family members. Adelaide was four and a half years old when her mother died and seven when she also lost her father. Adelaide and her brother, Charles, were brought up by their paternal grandparents, Charles Thomas, Prince of Löwenstein-Wertheim-Rosenberg (1783–1849) and his wife, Princess Sophie Luise of Windisch-Graetz (1784–1848). Her maternal grandparents were Karl Ludwig, Prince of Hohenlohe-Langenburg and Countess Amalie Henriette of Solms-Baruth.

Princess Adelaide belonged to the House of Löwenstein-Wertheim-Rosenberg, an originally morganatic branch of the House of Wittelsbach that was eventually elevated to princely status and then mediatised in 1819.

== Marriage ==
On 24 September 1851, Adelaide married Miguel de Bragança, the former occupant of the Portuguese throne. The bride was 20 years old while the groom was almost 49.

Miguel had at first served as regent in Portugal for his niece and betrothed Queen Maria II of Portugal but had seized the throne for himself on 23 June 1828. He was an avid conservative and admirer of Klemens von Metternich. He overturned the Constitutional Charter written by his brother, Pedro I of Brazil, and tried to rule as an absolute monarch. This resulted in the so-called Liberal Wars (1828–1834), a prolonged civil war between progressive constitutionalists and authoritarian absolutists.

The war ended in 1834 with the deposition of Miguel. He renounced all claims to the throne of Portugal in exchange for an annual pension. (Since he reneged on the terms of his deposition, he never collected the pension.) He was forced into a lifelong exile. He remained the senior male member of the Portuguese line of the House of Braganza. However, he was never restored to the throne and it is disputed whether his descendants' dynastic rights were restored. On 15 January 1837, his support of Infante Carlos, Count of Molina, the first Carlist pretender to the Spanish throne, resulted in the removal of his rights to the said throne.

=== Children ===
Adelaide and Miguel had seven children:

- Infanta Maria das Neves (5 August 1852 – 15 February 1941); married Infante Alfonso Carlos, Duke of San Jaime, Carlist claimant to the throne of Spain.
- Infante Miguel (19 September 1853 – 11 October 1927); paternal grandfather of the current pretender, Duarte Pio, Duke of Braganza.
- Infanta Maria Teresa (24 August 1855 – 12 February 1944); married Archduke Karl Ludwig of Austria. They had two daughters.
- Infanta Maria José (19 March 1857 – 11 March 1943); married Karl Theodor, Duke in Bavaria. They had five children, including Elisabeth of Bavaria, Queen of the Belgians.
- Infanta Adelgundes (10 November 1858 – 15 April 1946); married Prince Henry, Count of Bardi, son of Charles III, Duke of Parma.
- Infanta Maria Ana (13 July 1861 – 31 July 1942); married William IV, Grand Duke of Luxembourg. They had six daughters, including Marie-Adélaïde and Charlotte, Grand Duchess of Luxembourg.
- Infanta Maria Antónia (28 November 1862 – 14 May 1959); married Robert I, Duke of Parma. They had 12 children, including Zita, Empress of Austria.

In her memoirs, Princess Marie of Battenberg wrote, "Duchess Ada was an eminently interesting woman who, in Schloss Brombach, devoted herself entirely to the education of her numerous daughters." Princess Marie also wrote that "Aunt Jenny’s [Princess Johanna of Hohenlohe-Langenburg] favourite niece was Duchess Ada." She married Count Emil Christian of Erbach-Schönberg, Marie's aunt by alliance.

== Matchmaker and later life ==
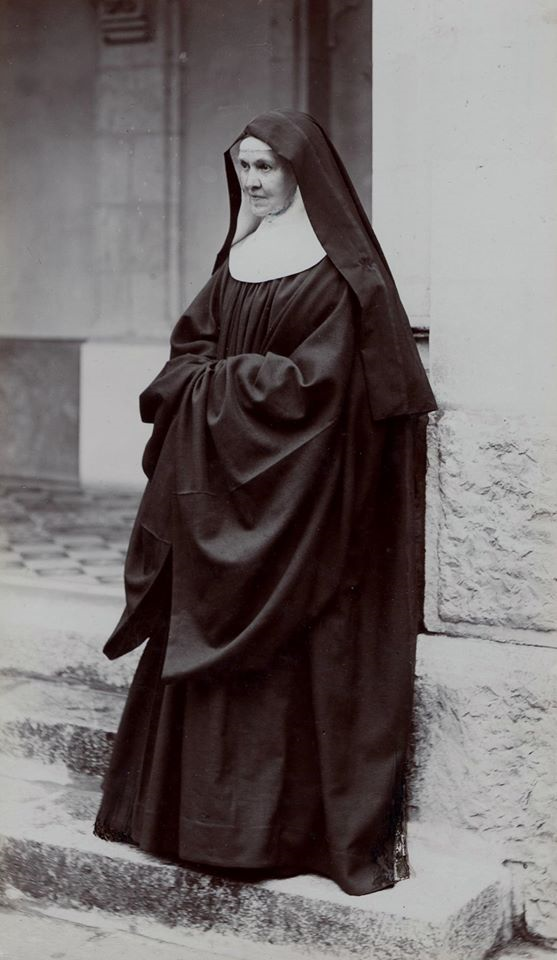
Adelaide as a nun (circa 1900)

Her husband, Miguel, died on 14 November 1866 before any of their children had reached adulthood. Adelaide, who was a very ambitious woman, would spend the next several decades attempting to secure prominent marriages for her children.

As a result of her largely successful attempts, her grandchildren would include (among others) Duarte Nuno, Duke of Braganza, Elisabeth Amalia, Princess of Liechtenstein, Elisabeth, Queen of the Belgians, Marie Gabrielle, Crown Princess of Bavaria, Marie-Adélaïde, Grand Duchess of Luxembourg, Charlotte, Grand Duchess of Luxembourg, Antoinette, Crown Princess of Bavaria, Xavier, Duke of Parma, Zita, Empress of Austria, Felix of Bourbon-Parma and Infanta Maria Adelaide of Portugal. Many of her descendants have inherited her longevity.

In 1895, Adelaide, a devout Catholic, some years after the marriage of her last daughter, retired to the abbey of Sainte-Cécile de Solesmes in north-western France. She professed as a nun there on 12 June 1897. The community later moved to Cowes and then to Ryde on the Isle of Wight, where Adelhaid died on 16 December 1909 at the age of 78. In 1967 both her body and that of her husband were moved to the Braganza mausoleum in the Monastery of São Vicente de Fora in Lisbon. During her life, she lived during the reign of 6 Portuguese kings: her future husband Miguel I until 1834; her niece Maria II until 1853 (from 1837 along with her consort Fernando II); her grandnephews Pedro V until 1861 and Luís I until 1889; her great-grandnephew Carlos I until 1908 and her great-great-grandnephew Manuel II from 1908.

== Ancestry ==
Ancestors of Adelaide of Löwenstein-Wertheim-Rosenberg

8. Dominic Constantine, Prince of Löwenstein
4. Charles Thomas, Prince of Löwenstein
9. Princess Leopoldine of Hohenlohe-Bartenstein
2. Constantine, Hereditary Prince of Löwenstein
10. Count Joseph Nicholas of Windisch-Graetz
5. Countess Sophie of Windisch-Graetz
11. Princess Léopoldine of Arenberg
1. Adelaide of Löwenstein
12. Christian Albrecht, Prince of Hohenlohe-Langenburg
6. Karl Ludwig, Prince of Hohenlohe-Langenburg
13. Princess Caroline of Stolberg-Gedern
3. Princess Agnes of Hohenlohe-Langenburg
14. Johann Christian II, Count of Solms-Baruth
7. Countess Amalie Henriette of Solms-Baruth
15. Countess Friederike Reuss of Köstritz

== Sources ==
- "The Book of Kings: A Royal Genealogy" by C. Arnold McNaughton.
- "Burke's Royal Families of the World", edited by Hugh Montgomery-Massingberd.

Adelaide of Löwenstein-Wertheim-Rosenberg House of Löwenstein-Wertheim-Rosenberg Cadet branch of the House of Löwenstein-Wertheim Born: 3 April 1831 Died: 16 December 1909
Titles in pretence
Vacant Title last held by Carlota Joaquina of Spain	— TITULAR — Queen consort of Portugal and the Algarves; Miguelist line 24 September 1851 – 14 November 1866	Vacant Title next held by Elisabeth of Thurn and Taxis
