= Seebenstein =

- Municipality
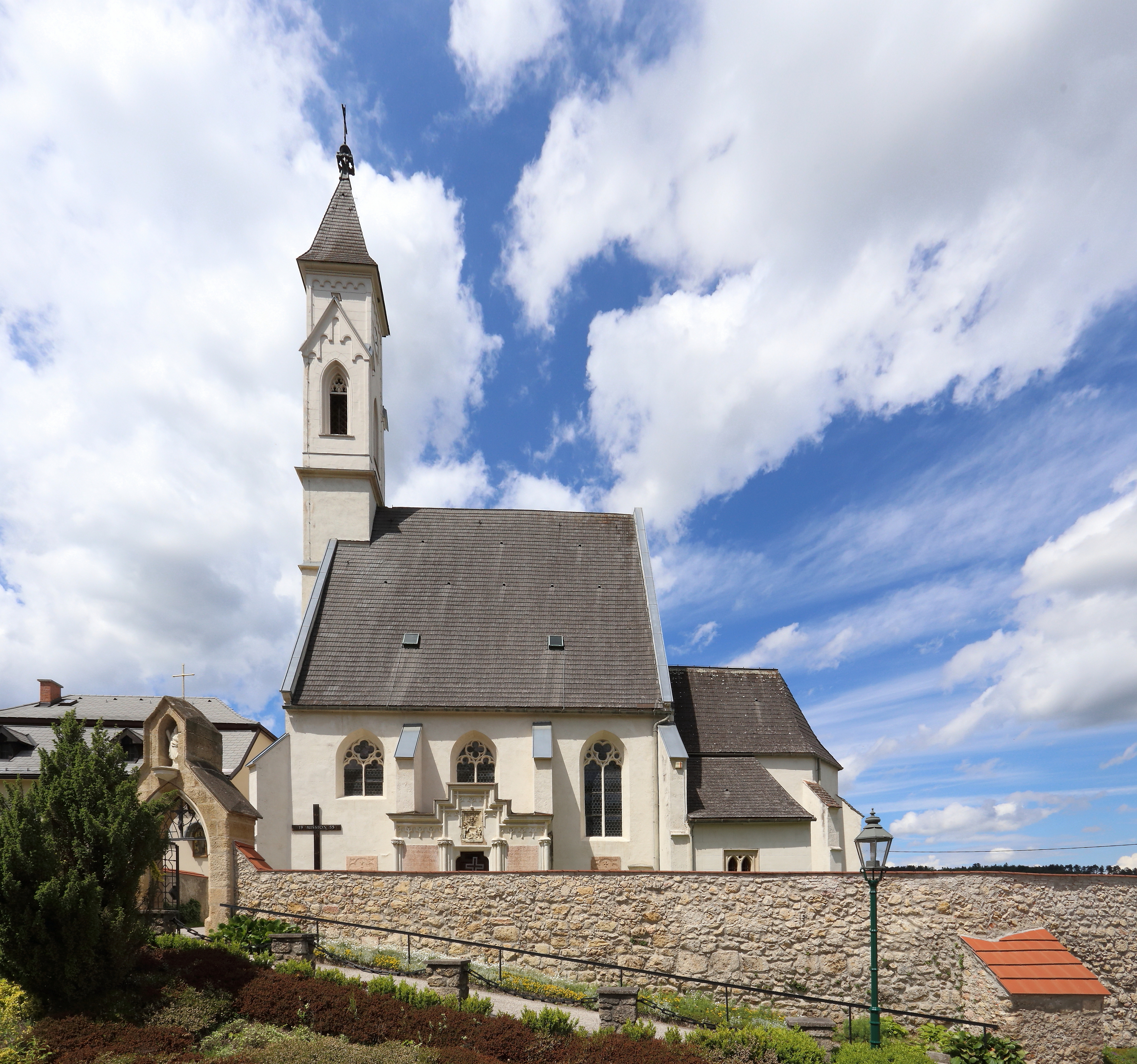

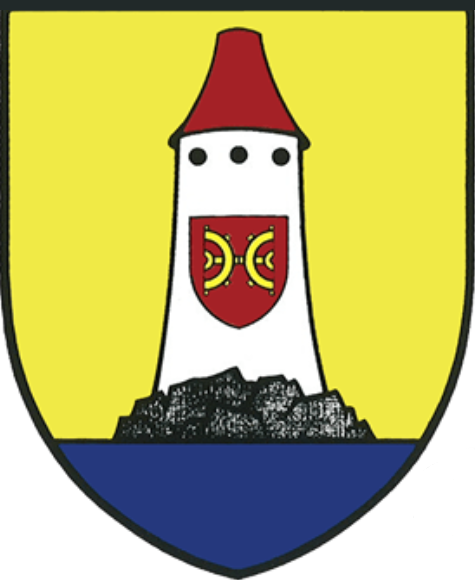
- Coat of arms

- Location within Austria
- Coordinates: 47°42′00″N 16°08′55″E
- Country: Austria
- State: Lower Austria
- District: Neunkirchen

Government
  - Mayor: Marion Wedl

Area
  - Total: 9.09 km^{2} (3.51 sq mi)
- Elevation: 348 m (1,142 ft)

Population (2018-01-01)
  - Total: 1,401
  - Density: 154/km^{2} (399/sq mi)
- Time zone: UTC+1 (CET)
  - Summer (DST): UTC+2 (CEST)
- Postal code: 2824
- Area code: 02627
- Website: www.seebenstein.at

Seebenstein is a town in the district of Neunkirchen in the Austrian state of Lower Austria. It is often called the "Pearl of the Pitten valley" ("Perle des Pittentals") due to its preserved nature.

== Geography ==
Seebenstein is in the industrial quarter of Lower Austria. The town covers 9.09 square kilometers and is 62.71 percent forested. The town includes the Seebenstein nature park and it borders the historic ruin of the Türkensturz. The town is overlooked by the medieval castle Burg Seebenstein.

== History ==
In ancient times, Seebenstein was part of the Celtic kingdom of Noricum.

On April 16, 1972, Seebenstein was the center of a magnitude 5.3 earthquake

=== Historical population ===
Historical population
Year	Pop.	±%
1869	587	—
1880	700	+19.3%
1890	768	+9.7%
1900	872	+13.5%
1910	979	+12.3%
1923	1,049	+7.2%
1934	952	−9.2%
1939	967	+1.6%
1951	1,075	+11.2%
1961	1,033	−3.9%
1971	1,088	+5.3%
1981	1,040	−4.4%
1991	1,139	+9.5%
2001	1,196	+5.0%
2011	1,326	+10.9%
2021	1,470	+10.9%

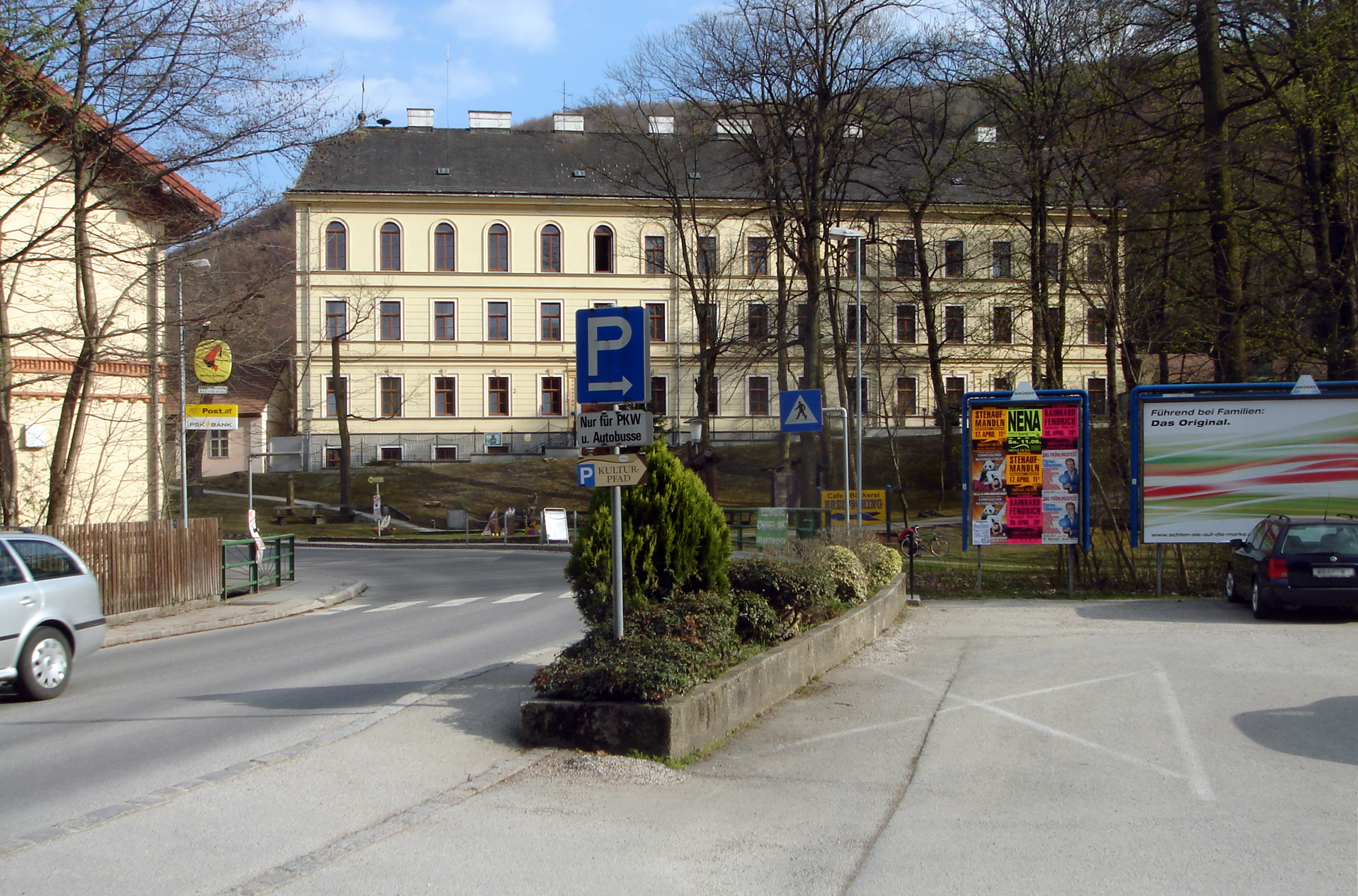
Building from carpark

== Demographics ==
In the 2001 census the population was described as 84.4% Roman Catholic, 3.8% evangelical, 0.5% Muslim, 0.3% Orthodox Christian, and 9.4% with no religion. Additional to the current population of 1470, around 500 people have a summer house in Seebenstein.
