= Princess Agnes of Hohenlohe-Langenburg =

Hereditary Princess of Löwenstein-Wertheim-Rosenberg (1804–1835)

Princess Agnes
- Hereditary Princess of Löwenstein-Wertheim-Rosenberg
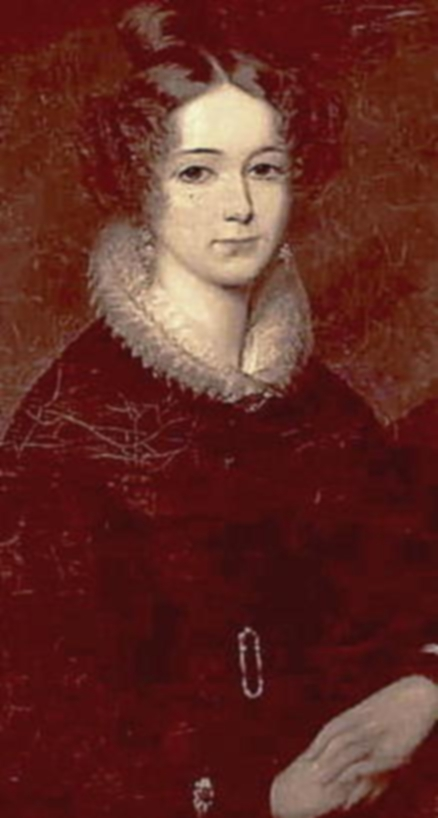
- Born: 5 December 1804; Langenburg, Principality of Hohenlohe-Langenburg
- Died: 9 September 1835 (aged 30); Haid, Kingdom of Bohemia, Austrian Empire
- Burial: Engelberg Monastery, Großheubach, Bavaria
- Spouse: Constantine, Hereditary Prince of Löwenstein-Wertheim-Rosenberg (m. 1829)
- Issue: Adelaide, Queen of Portugal; Charles, Prince of Löwenstein-Wertheim-Rosenberg
Names
- German: Marie Agnes Henriette
- House: Hohenlohe-Langenburg
- Father: Karl Ludwig, Prince of Hohenlohe-Langenburg
- Mother: Countess Amalie Henriette of Solms-Baruth

Princess Marie Agnes Henriette of Hohenlohe-Langenburg, full German name: Marie Agnes Henriette, Prinzessin zu Hohenlohe-Langenburg (5 December 1804 – 9 September 1835) was a member of the House of Hohenlohe-Langenburg and a Princess of Hohenlohe-Langenburg by birth. Through her marriage to Constantine, Hereditary Prince of Löwenstein, Agnes was also a member of the House of Löwenstein and Hereditary Princess of Löwenstein. Through her daughter Adelaide of Löwenstein, Agnes is an ancestor to numerous Roman Catholic European royal families.

== Family ==
Agnes was the eleventh child of Karl Ludwig III, Prince von Hohenlohe-Langenburg and his wife Countess Amalie Henriette of Solms-Baruth.

== Marriage and issue ==
Agnes married Constantine, Hereditary Prince of Löwenstein, eldest child and only son of Charles Thomas, Prince of Löwenstein and Countess Sophie of Windisch-Grätz, on 31 May 1829 at Schloss Wildeck in Zschopau, Kingdom of Saxony. They had two children:

- Adelaide of Löwenstein (3 April 1831 – 16 December 1909). Married former king Miguel I of Portugal.
- Charles, Prince of Löwenstein (21 May 1834 – 8 November 1921). Married Princess Sophie of Liechtenstein, daughter of Alois II, Prince of Liechtenstein and Countess Franziska Kinsky of Wchinitz and Tettau.

== Ancestry ==
Ancestors of Princess Agnes of Hohenlohe-Langenburg

8. Ludwig, Prince of Hohenlohe-Langenburg
4. Christian Albrecht, Prince of Hohenlohe-Langenburg
9. Countess Eleonore of Nassau-Saarbrücken
2. Karl Ludwig, Prince of Hohenlohe-Langenburg
10. Frederick Charles, Prince of Stolberg-Gedern
5. Princess Caroline of Stolberg-Gedern
11. Countess Louise of Nassau-Saarbrücken
1. Princess Agnes of Hohenlohe-Langenburg
12. Johann Karl, Count of Solms-Baruth
6. Johann Christian II, Count of Solms-Baruth
13. Countess Henriette of Lippe-Biesterfeld
3. Countess Amalie Henriette of Solms-Baruth
14. Heinrich VI, Count Reuss of Köstritz
7. Countess Friederike Reuss of Köstritz
15. Enriqueta Casado y Huguetan, 4th Marquise of Monteleone
