= Princess Maria Francisca of Orléans-Braganza =

Duchess of Braganza (1914–1968)

Maria Francisca
- Duchess of Braganza (more...)
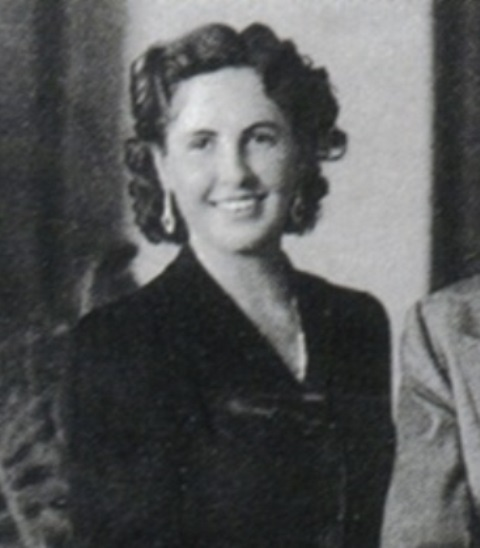
- Maria Francisca in 1942
- Born: 8 September 1914; Château d'Eu, Eu, France
- Died: 15 January 1968 (aged 53); Lisbon, Portugal
- Burial: Chagas de Cristo Convent, Vila Viçosa
- Spouse: Duarte Nuno, Duke of Braganza (m. 1942)
- Issue details...: Duarte Pio, Duke of Braganza; Miguel Rafael, Duke of Viseu; Henrique Nuno, Duke of Coimbra
Names
- Maria Francisca Amélia Luísa Vitória Teresa Isabel Miguela Gabriela Rafaela Gonzaga
- House: Orléans-Braganza
- Father: Pedro de Alcântara, Prince of Grão-Pará
- Mother: Countess Elisabeth Dobrzensky of Dobrzenicz

Dona Maria Francisca (Maria Francisca Amélia Luísa Vitória Teresa Isabel Miguela Gabriela Rafaela Gonzaga; 8 September 1914 – 15 January 1968) was a member of the House of Orléans-Braganza and the wife of Duarte Nuno, Duke of Braganza, the pretender to the Portuguese throne. She was the daughter of Pedro de Alcântara, Prince of Grão-Pará, head of the Petrópolis line of the House of Orléans-Braganza. She married Duarte Nuno in 1942, a union that was seen as a reconciliation between the two branches of the Portuguese Royal House. Together they had three sons, the eldest of whom, Duarte Pio, is the current pretender to the throne.

== Life ==
Maria Francisca Amélia Luísa Vitória Teresa Isabel Miguela Gabriela Rafaela Gonzaga was born at Château d'Eu in Eu, France, the daughter of Pedro de Alcântara, Prince of Grão-Pará (1875–1940), the eldest son of Isabel, Princess Imperial of Brazil and grandson of Emperor Pedro II, and Countess Elisabeth Dobrzensky of Dobrzenicz (1875–1951), a Bohemian noblewoman. Her father had to renounce his dynastic rights in order to marry her mother who, in spite of her noble background, did not belong to any reigning dynasty.

Maria Francisca died in Lisbon on 15 January 1968. She was buried at the Chagas de Cristo (Jesus's Five Sacred Wounds) Convent, in Vila Viçosa, the pantheon of the duchesses of Braganza.

== Marriage ==
She was married to Duarte Nuno (1907–1976), Duke of Braganza and claimant to the throne of Portugal, civilly in the Portuguese Embassy in Rio de Janeiro, Brazil, on 13 October 1942 and religiously in Petrópolis, Brazil, on 15 October.

The religious ceremony took place in the Cathedral of Petrópolis and was presided by Cardinal Sebastião Leme da Silveira Cintra, Metropolitan Archbishop of Rio de Janeiro. The Rite of Marriage was followed by a Nuptial Mass, and the newlyweds received an Apostolic Blessing from Pope Pius XII, according to a telegram that was read on the occasion. After the religious ceremony, three identical registries of marriage were made, one for the canonical archives of the local parish, one for the archives of the Brazilian Imperial House, and one for the archives of the Portuguese Royal House.

Since the civil ceremony did not take place before the Brazilian authorities but in the Portuguese Embassy, a question then arose regarding the manner of recognizing the marriage in the Law of Brazil. In the wake of the Proclamation of the Republic in Brazil, Separation of Church and State had been instituted, and Catholic weddings no longer had automatic civil effect. Actually, between 1890 and 1937, religious weddings could have no civil effect at all, and all couples marrying in Brazil were obliged to undergo a civil ceremony of marriage before a Justice of the Peace, even if they also wanted to have a (legally unrecognized) religious wedding before of after that. However, in 1937, Brazil had adopted legislation that permitted the recognition of civil effects to religious weddings, but in order for the wedding to be thus recognized, a set of pre-marriage bureaucratic procedures had to be followed. The couple, however, failed to follow those procedures. The groom and his family had assumed that the civil effect question would have been resolved by the civil wedding at the Portuguese Embassy. Another factor, though less decisive, was that some in the bride's family refused to recognize the Brazilian Republic, the Separation of Church and State, and the Laws of Republican Brazil that imposed conditions for the civil recognition of a Catholic wedding and thus behaved as if the Catholic wedding had full effect in and of itself, as was the case during the previous imperial era. So, no real study had been made prior to the wedding about what would be required for it to be recognized in Brazil. Therefore, a problem arose, because the Brazilian authorities initially refused to recognize both the Portuguese Embassy wedding and the Catholic wedding. The reason for Brazil not recognizing the Embassy wedding was that Brazil usually only recognized marriages contracted before diplomatic or consular officials of foreign Nations when both parties where of the same nationality, and were getting married before a representative of their country. But the bride was a Brazilian citizen, and the groom was a German-born naturalized Portuguese citizen. Thus the Embassy wedding did not meet the criteria for recognition, as Brazilian authorities insisted that a marriage of two people of different nationalities in Brazil needed to be conducted under the Brazilian Laws, especially if one of the parties was a Brazilian national. As for the Catholic wedding, since the religious ceremony had not been preceded by the recently created bureaucratic pre-marriage procedure for a religious wedding to have civil effect in Brazil, the Brazilian authorities initially would not recognize it. So the marriage was already recognized under the Laws of the Portuguese Republic, and was even recognized by the Royal House of Portugal and the Imperial House of Brazil (both Sovereign Houses regarded the Catholic marriage as the relevant one, in accordance with the laws that had prevailed in the former Kingdom of Portugal and in the former Empire of Brazil), but it could not be recognized in the then current Brazilian Civil Law, unless extraordinary measures were adopted to remedy the situation. Celebrating a new civil marriage was out of the question, both because it would imply that the Brazilian bride was living with her husband but was not yet fully married to him (the couple started living together after the second ceremony, that is, after the Catholic wedding), and also because the pre-marriage habilitation process for Brazilian civil ceremony (that would have been the third marriage ceremony) would take several weeks. So, the only solution was to obtain from the Brazilian authorities a special act of recognition of one of the two weddings already celebrated, and that was what was done in the days that followed. After influential entrepreneur Assis Chateaubriand Bandeira de Mello brought the problem to the attention of high-ranking Brazilian authorities, the Brazilian Government agreed to take exceptional measures to remedy the situation of the royal couple.

Accordingly, the question of the recognition of the marriage in the law of Brazil was settled on 20 October 1942, when the dictatorial Brazilian President Getúlio Vargas issued a special "alvará" (a kind of decree), naming ex post facto one of the guests of the religious wedding as his representative empowered to witness that wedding on behalf of the Presidency of the Republic. By this same document the Brazilian President directed that, extraordinarily, the religious wedding already celebrated on 15 October should be recognized as having civil effects, and that the said decree of the Presidency of the Republic would have full force as a Brazilian civil marriage certificate, with effect retroactive to 15 October. The decree was countersigned by the Brazilian Minister of Education and Culture, Gustavo Capanema, then Acting as interim Minister of Foreign Affairs, and was published in the Official Journal of the Brazilian Government on 22 October 1942.

The couple departed from Brazil on 28 October 1942.

== Ancestry ==
Ancestors of Princess Maria Francisca of Orléans-Braganza

8. Prince Louis, Duke of Nemours
4. Prince Gaston, Count of Eu
9. Princess Victoria of Saxe-Coburg and Gotha
2. Pedro de Alcântara, Prince of Grão-Pará
10. Pedro II of Brazil
5. Isabel, Princess Imperial of Brazil
11. Princess Teresa Cristina of the Two Sicilies
1. Princess Maria Francisca de Orléans e Bragança
12. Baron Johann Nepomuk Dobrženský von Dobrženitz
6. Count Johann Wenzel Dobrženský von Dobrženitz
13. Baroness Marie Friederike Wanczura von Rzehnicz
3. Countess Elisabeth Dobrženský von Dobrženitz
14. Count Josef Kottulinsky von Kottulin und Krzizkowitz
7. Countess Elisabeth Kottulinsky von Kottulin und Krzizkowitz
15. Countess Adelheid von Attems-Heiligenkreuz

== Issue ==
Name	Portrait	Birth	Death	Notes
Duarte Pio, Duke of Braganza		15 May 1945		24th Duke of Braganza; pretender to the throne
Infante Miguel, Duke of Viseu		3 December 1946		8th Duke of Viseu, Infante of Portugal; 4th in line of succession
Infante Henrique, Duke of Coimbra		6 November 1949	14 February 2017	4th Duke of Coimbra, Infante of Portugal
