= Princess Magdalena Reuss of Köstritz =

Magdalena
- Princess Hubertus of Prussia
- Born: 20 August 1920; Leipzig, Weimar Republic
- Died: 10 October 2009 (aged 89); Löwenstein Castle, Kleinheubach, Germany
- Burial: Hohenzollern Castle, Baden-Württemberg, Germany
- Spouse: Prince Hubertus of Prussia (m. 1943; died 1950)
- Issue: Anastasia, Princess of Löwenstein-Wertheim-Rosenberg; Princess Marie Christine
Names
- German: Magdalene Pauline
- House: Reuss Younger Line
- Father: Prince Heinrich XXXVI Reuss of Köstritz
- Mother: Princess Hermine of Schönburg-Waldenburg

Princess Magdalena Pauline Reuss of Köstritz (20 August 1920 – 10 October 2009) was the wife of Prince Hubertus of Prussia. By birth, she was a member of the House of Reuss.

== Early life ==
Born on 20 Aug 1920, Leipzig, Germany, as the eldest daughter of Prince Heinrich XXXVI Reuss of Köstritz (1888-1956) and his wife, Princess Hermine of Schönburg-Waldenburg (1899-1982). She had one younger sister Caroline (1923-2010), who married Count Alfred of Wedel-Jarlsberg (1895-1973).

== Marriage and issue ==
On 5 June 1943 at Schloss Prillwitz in Potsdam, Magdalena married Prince Hubertus of Prussia, a younger son of William, German Crown Prince and Duchess Cecilie of Mecklenburg-Schwerin. He had previously been married to Baroness Maria Anna Sybilla Margaretha von Humboldt-Dachröden (1916-2003), whom he divorced the year he married Magdalena. They had two daughters:

- Princess Anastasia Victoria Cecilia Hermine of Prussia (February 14, 1944 – August 16, 2026). Married Alois-Konstantin, 9th Prince of Löwenstein-Wertheim-Rosenberg and had issue.
- Princess Marie Christine of Prussia (July 18, 1947 – May 29, 1966) who died from injuries resulting from a car accident.

The couple settled briefly in Silesia but were forced to flee west with their infant daughter Anastasia from the advancing Red Army. Hubertus found work managing several wineries in 1947, and the couple had their second daughter that same year. Hubertus moved to south-western Africa in 1950 to begin a new life as a sheep farmer; he chose to leave because it "was a haven of rest far distant from the political turmoil in Germany". Magdalena and their two daughters planned to join him in Windhoek in the summer of that year. Hubertus caught appendicitis and died from peritonitis in April the following year with his wife by his side.

Magdalena died on 10 October 2009 at her daughter Anastasia's home, Löwenstein Castle, Kleinheubach. She was the last surviving daughter-in-law of Crown Prince Wilhelm. Magdalena was buried next to her husband at St. Michaels Bastei, near Burg Hohenzollern.
