= Princess Anastasia of Prussia =

German aristocrat (1944–2026)

Anastasia, Princess of Löwenstein-Wertheim-Rosenberg
- Princess of Prussia
- Anastasia in 2018

Princess consort of Löwenstein-Wertheim-Rosenberg
- Reign: 23 August 1990 – 16 August 2026
- Born: 14 February 1944; Brieg, Silesia, German Reich
- Died: 16 August 2026 (aged 82)
- Spouse: Alois Konstantin zu Löwenstein-Wertheim-Rosenberg (m. 1965)
- Issue: 4 children, including Leo Löwenstein
Names
- Anastasia Viktoria Cäcilie Hermine
- House: Hohenzollern
- Father: Prince Hubertus of Prussia
- Mother: Princess Magdalena Reuss of Köstritz

Anastasia, Princess of Löwenstein-Wertheim-Rosenberg (14 February 1944 – 16 August 2026), born Princess Anastasia of Prussia, was a German aristocrat and member of the House of Hohenzollern by birth. She was a great-granddaughter of William II, German Emperor, the last German Emperor and King of Prussia. Through her marriage to Alois Konstantin zu Löwenstein-Wertheim-Rosenberg, she became a member of the House of Löwenstein-Wertheim-Rosenberg.

Born in Silesia during the final years of the Second World War, Anastasia spent her early childhood during the displacement of the German population from the region. Her family subsequently settled in Bavaria, where she later lived at Schloss Löwenstein in Kleinheubach with her husband and children.

Having trained and worked as an educator, she became particularly involved in charitable, religious and community activities. She maintained a longstanding association with Kleinheubach and was recognised for her contributions to the local community, receiving the municipality's Silver Civic Medal and the Bavarian Red Cross Gold Medal of Honour for exceptional service.

== Early life ==
Anastasia was born on 14 February 1944 in Brieg, Silesia, then part of the German Reich. Her full name was Anastasia Viktoria Cäcilie Hermine. She was the elder daughter of Prince Hubertus of Prussia (1909–1950) and his second wife, Princess Magdalena Reuss of Köstritz (1920–2009).

Her father was a son of William, German Crown Prince and a grandson of William II, German Emperor, making Anastasia a great-granddaughter of the last German Emperor. Hubertus was also a brother of Louis Ferdinand, Prince of Prussia, who later became head of the House of Hohenzollern.

Anastasia's early childhood coincided with the final stages of the Second World War and the subsequent upheaval in Central Europe. Her family left Silesia shortly after her birth, as the region was affected by the advance of Soviet forces and the displacement of its German population. According to a regional account published after her death, the family fled their home in Silesia by horse-drawn carriage.

Her father died in 1950, when Anastasia was six years old, from peritonitis. Her mother died in 2009. Anastasia grew up with her younger sister, Marie Christine. In 1966, her sister died aged 18 from injuries sustained in a road accident. A memorial gravestone commemorating her was subsequently placed in the Protestant cemetery in Kleinheubach.

As a young woman, Anastasia trained and worked as an educator. Her professional background was subsequently mentioned in accounts of her life, which described her as having brought a practical and people-oriented approach to her public and charitable activities.

== Marriage and children ==
Anastasia married Alois-Konstantin, Hereditary Prince of Löwenstein-Wertheim-Rosenberg, in 1965. The civil ceremony took place on 8 October at Bronnbach Abbey, followed by a religious wedding ceremony on 8 November at Erbach in the Rheingau. Following her marriage, she became a member of the House of Löwenstein-Wertheim-Rosenberg and converted from Protestantism to Roman Catholicism.

The House of Löwenstein-Wertheim-Rosenberg is a branch of the House of Wittelsbach, with its origins in the family of the former rulers of the Electorate of the Palatinate. Anastasia's husband succeeded his father as head of the princely house in 1990.

The couple had four children:

- Carl Friedrich Hubertus Georg Eduardo Paolo Nicolo Franz Alois Ignatius Hieronymus Maria (30 September 1966 – 24 April 2010); married Stephanie von Brenken on 8 August 1998. They had four children: Augustina, Nicodemus, Laurentius and Kiliana. He was known as Leo Löwenstein and was a German endurance racing driver. He died aged 43 following an accident during the third round of the VLN Langstreckenmeisterschaft Nürburgring at the Nürburgring on 24 April 2010, when his Aston Martin V8 Vantage crashed and caught fire during the race.
- Hubertus Maximilian Gabriel Louis Franz Constantin Dominik Wunibald Maria (born 18 December 1968); married Iris von Dörnberg in September 2010. The couple married in a religious ceremony on 18 September in Alsfeld.
- Christina Maria Johanna Caroline Magdalene Osy Cecilie Hermine Isidora Victoria Anastasia (born 4 April 1974 in Frankfurt am Main); married Guido von Rohr (born 27 September 1969 in Hanover) on 5 October 2002 in Kleinheubach. The couple have four children: Antonius, Konstantin, Cecilia and Maria. Their marriage was also recorded as having taken place in a civil ceremony in June 2002.
- Dominik Wilhelm Christian Nikolaus Sturmius Antonius Charles Benedikt Felix Maria (born 7 March 1983); married Olga zu Castell-Rüdenhausen. They have one son.

The family lived abroad for periods because of Alois-Konstantin's professional commitments. They eventually settled at Schloss Löwenstein in Kleinheubach, in the Lower Franconia region of Bavaria.

== Life in Kleinheubach ==
After settling at Schloss Löwenstein, Anastasia became closely associated with Kleinheubach and its residents. The family was well known in the area, and local accounts described her as approachable and interested in the people around her. Although conscious of her family's aristocratic background, she was described as not being aloof and as having used her social position to encourage support for charitable causes.

A regional tribute published after her death described the castle as the centre of her life for many decades. It also recalled her work as an educator and portrayed her as someone whose public role was grounded in personal relationships and a sense of responsibility towards others.

Her religious commitments were an important part of her life in Kleinheubach. She was particularly involved with the local Catholic parish and supported understanding and cooperation between Christian churches. Her charitable interests also extended beyond the municipality, where she supported initiatives for the common good.

== Charitable activities ==
The municipality of Kleinheubach recognised Anastasia's longstanding involvement in community life and her contribution to local religious and charitable activities. In particular, the municipal tribute noted her decades of commitment to the Catholic parish, her support for cooperation among Christian churches and her work for the wider community.

For her services to the municipality, she was awarded the Silver Civic Medal of Kleinheubach. The municipal memorial described her as a person whose helpfulness, sense of responsibility and close connection with residents had earned her lasting respect. It also recognised her as an example of care and humanity.

In October 2025, Anastasia was among seven people recognised by the district association of the Bavarian Red Cross with its Gold Medal of Honour for exceptional service. The award acknowledged her longstanding contribution to charitable work.

She was also a dame of the Order of the Holy Sepulchre and a recipient of the Order of Louise, a Prussian order established by Frederick William III of Prussia in honour of his wife, Louise of Mecklenburg-Strelitz. Both distinctions were recorded in the family's death announcement.

== Death ==
Anastasia died unexpectedly on 16 August 2026, aged 82. Her death was announced by her husband, Alois-Konstantin, on behalf of himself and the wider family. The family announcement described her as a beloved wife, mother, mother-in-law and grandmother. It also confirmed her association with the Order of the Holy Sepulchre and the Order of Louise.

Her death was marked by mourning at properties associated with the House of Löwenstein-Wertheim-Rosenberg, including Schloss Löwenstein in Kleinheubach and other family properties in the region. News of her death was reported by German and Austrian media on 21 August 2026, following confirmation from the family.

A requiem was held on 1 September 2026 at the Church of the Most Holy Trinity in Kleinheubach. Members of European noble families attended the service, alongside local representatives and members of the community. The service concluded with a performance of Johann Sebastian Bach's Jesus bleibet meine Freude (Jesu, Joy of Man's Desiring).

The municipal council of Kleinheubach published a memorial tribute expressing gratitude for her decades of service and extending condolences to her family. She was subsequently laid to rest in the family tomb at Engelberg Abbey in nearby Großheubach.
