= Ferdinand Becker =

German painter (1846–1877)

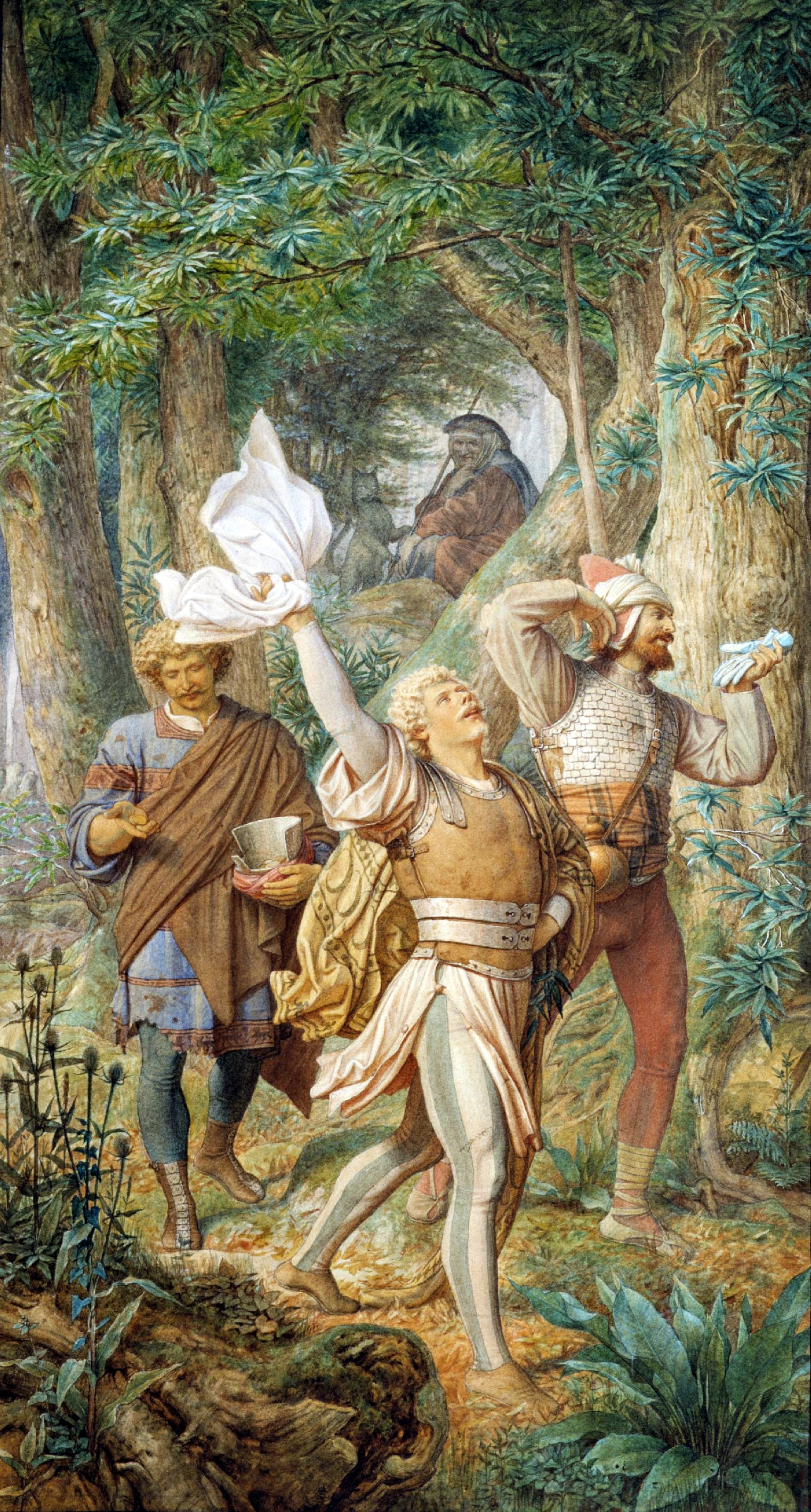
- Scene from the Song of Roland
- Born: 2 July 1846; Gonsenheim, Grand Duchy of Hesse and by Rhine
- Died: 21 August 1877 (aged 31); Munich, Kingdom of Bavaria, German Empire
- Known for: Painting
- Movement: Realism

Joseph Ferdinand Becker (1846–1877) was a German painter.

== Life ==
He was born at Gonsenheim on 2 July 1846, the son of an innkeeper. Becker's father was initially opposed to him following an artistic career, but was eventually persuaded otherwise by the painter August Gustav Lasinsky who was decorating a church at Finthen. Lasinsky – an artist working under the influence of the Nazarene Brotherhood – took Becker on as a pupil between 1865 and 1868, and Becker assisted his teacher on decorations at the church of St Ignaz in Mainz, and at Mainz Cathedral. In 1868 he moved to Frankfurt, where he studied under Eduard von Steinle at the Städel Kunstinstitut. Steinle encouraged him to make works illustrating folk tales, which he executed in watercolour.

His growing reputation led to a commission from the Prince Georg zu Löwenstein-Wertheim-Freudenberg to decorate the chapel of Löwenstein Castle at Kleinheubach am Main (1870–71) and in 1872 he painted an altarpiece for the church of St Peter in Mainz. Becker's work was in great demand: his most celebrated picture, Der Jude im Dorn (1874–75), a watercolour illustrating the German fairy tale by the Brothers Grimm was purchased for the royal collection Galerie Neue Meister in Dresden for 4,500 marks, and his last major work, "Die Rolandsknappen", a cycle of five watercolours, was bought by the city of Mainz in 1876. It is now in the collection of the Landesmuseum Mainz.

In April 1877 he moved to Munich to work for King Ludwig II of Bavaria, but died of typhus there on 21 August 1877, aged 31. His body was returned to Gosenheim for burial.

He is sometimes known as "Maler Becker", meaning simply "Painter Becker".
