= Leo Löwenstein =

German race driver (1966–2010)

Carl Friedrich
- Hereditary Prince of Löwenstein-Wertheim-Rosenberg
- Born: 30 September 1966; Frankfurt am Main, Hesse, West Germany
- Died: 24 April 2010 (aged 43); Nürburgring, Nürburg, Germany
- Burial: 30 April 2010; Engelberg Monastery, Großheubach, Germany
- Spouse: Stephanie von Brenken (m. 1998)
- Issue: 4
Names
- German: Carl Friedrich Hubertus Georg Eduardo Paolo Nicolo Franz Alois Ignatius Hieronymus Maria
- House: Löwenstein-Wertheim-Rosenberg
- Father: Alois-Konstantin, Prince of Löwenstein-Wertheim-Rosenberg
- Mother: Princess Anastasia of Prussia

Carl-Friedrich Hubertus Georg Eduardo Paolo Nickolos Franz Alois Ignatius Hieronymus Maria Prinz zu Löwenstein-Wertheim-Rosenberg (30 September 1966 – 24 April 2010), better known by his racing alias Leonhard "Leo" Löwenstein, was a German and endurance race driver participating in the VLN.

== Career ==
Löwenstein drove his first race 2006 in the ADAC "Chevy" Egons 500 in the Nordschleife GP in a Porsche 911 at the Nürburgring.

== Death ==
During the third round of the VLN-long-distance championship of 2010, his Aston Martin V8 Vantage overturned and hit a guardrail and the rear of his car went up in flames. Efforts to extricate him from the wreck were futile, and despite instant rescue efforts, he died at the accident scene of smoke inhalation.

He is the seventh person to have died during the German Endurance Championship since 1977.

His funeral took place on 30 April 2010 at the family tomb at the Engelberg Monastery in Großheubach. The burial was preceded by a funeral service at the Church of the Holy Trinity in Kleinheubach.

== Personal life ==
Löwenstein was the eldest son and heir to Alois-Konstantin, Prince of Löwenstein-Wertheim-Rosenberg, who became Hereditary Prince in 1990 upon the death of his grandfather. He was a great-great-great-great-grandson of Queen Victoria through descent from her eldest daughter, the Victoria, Princess Royal (German Empress) (although as heir to the Roman Catholic branch of the Princely House of Löwenstein he may have been barred by the Act of Settlement from eligibility for succession to the British throne).

He married Stephanie Sophie Marie Coletta von Brenken (born 1970) in a civil ceremony on 16 May 1998 at Kleinheubach Castle, and in a religious ceremony on 8 August 1998 at Erpernburg Castle. The couple had four children.

Löwenstein and his family lived in the village of Laudenbach am Main in Bavaria, where they ran a vineyard.

His aunt, Princess Marie Christine of Prussia, was killed in an auto accident in 1966, four months before his birth.

== See also ==
- List of Nürburgring fatal accidents
