= Leopold Bode =

German artist

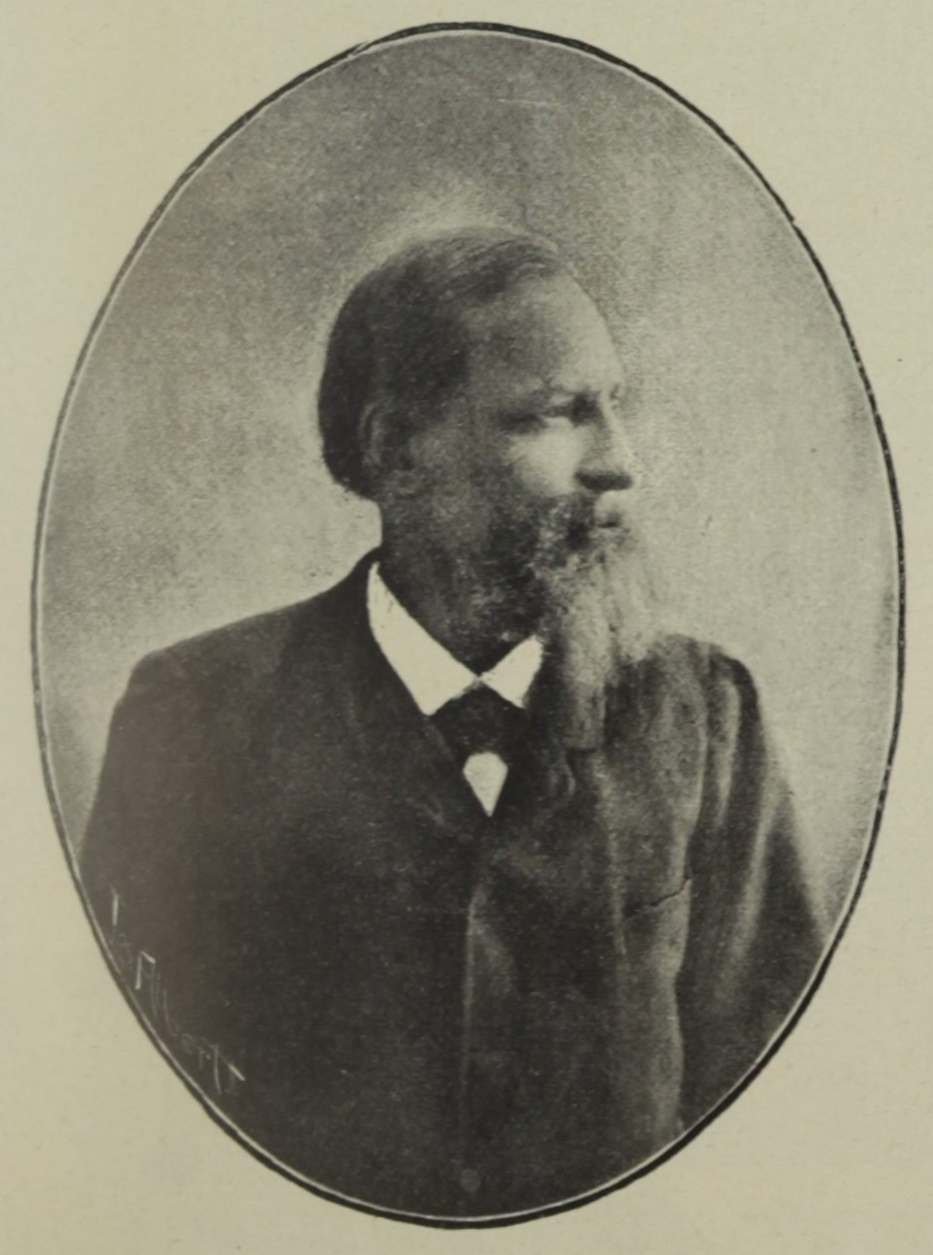
- Born: 11 March 1831; Offenbach am Main
- Died: 26 July 1906 (aged 75); Frankfurt am Main
- Education: The Städel
- Movement: Nazarene, Romanticism

Christian Leopold Bode (11 March 1831 – July 1906) was a German historical painter and graphic artist.

== Life ==
Bode was born in Offenbach am Main. He was the eldest of the landscape painter Georg Wilhelm Bode (1801–1881) and his wife Anna Maria's three sons. From 1848 he studied at the Städel in Frankfurt under Professors Jakob Becker and Johann David Passavant. In 1851 he placed himself under the tutelage of Eduard von Steinle and married Catharina Elisabeth Geiger (1826–1856). After graduating in 1859, he married Catharina's sister Mary Margaret, with whom he had three children. For many years he had a studio at the Städel and in Isenburg Castle in Offenbach, the latter of which inspired numerous exterior and interior views in his paintings.

In 1901 on the day of Bode's seventieth birthday, Grand Duke Ernest Louis of Hesse bestowed upon him the title of Professor.

Bode died 26 July 1906 in Frankfurt, and was buried in the Old Cemetery in Offenbach. In 2011 Bode's diary, which had been lost during World War II, was found and donated to the Offenbach city archive, which also acquired a bundle with 45 of Bode's graphic depictions of landscapes and historical motifs.

== Work ==
Bode was heavily influenced by the religiously-inspired Nazarene style before later pivoting to historical Romanticism, genre painting, and portraiture. His first important painting was his 1855 depiction of the Visitation: "Visit of Mary to Elizabeth". From 1861 to 1864 he worked as Steinle's assistant at the Wallraf-Richartz Museum in Cologne. Both men then worked until 1866 painting the chancel niches in the Coronation Monastery of St. Mary in Aachen and collaborated on painting Löwestein Castle's chapel in 1870. In 1880 he helped paint the stairwell and lunettes at the Frankfurt Opera House, after which he painted a series of portraits of prominent citizens of Offenbach. In 1896 he painted the niches in the mourning hall of Frankfurt's southern cemetery and in 1897 he created an altarpiece for the newly built St. Paul's Church of Strasbourg.

== Gallery ==
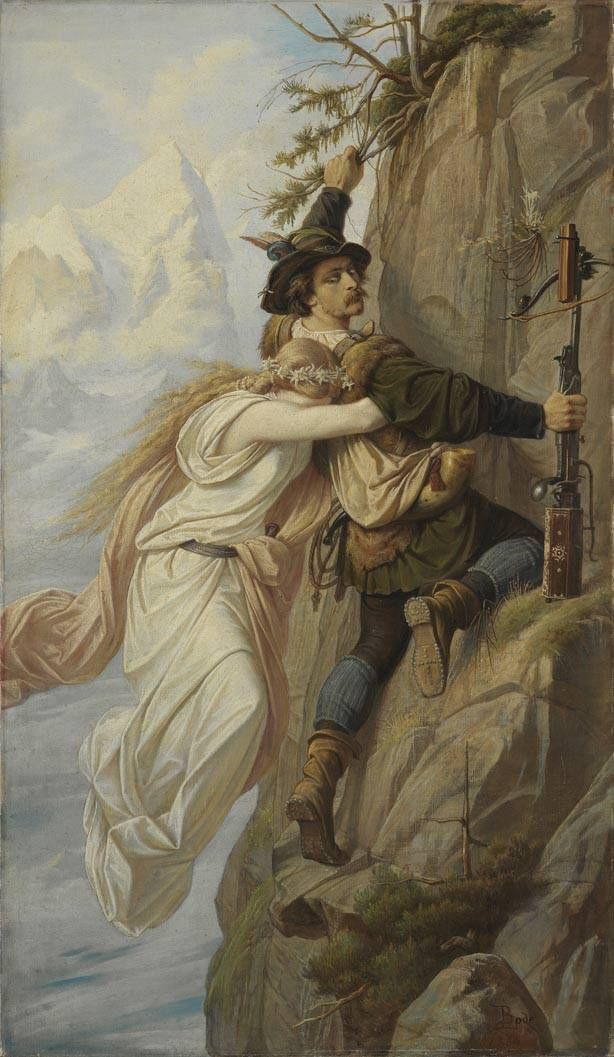
The Alpine Bride, oil on canvas, 1864

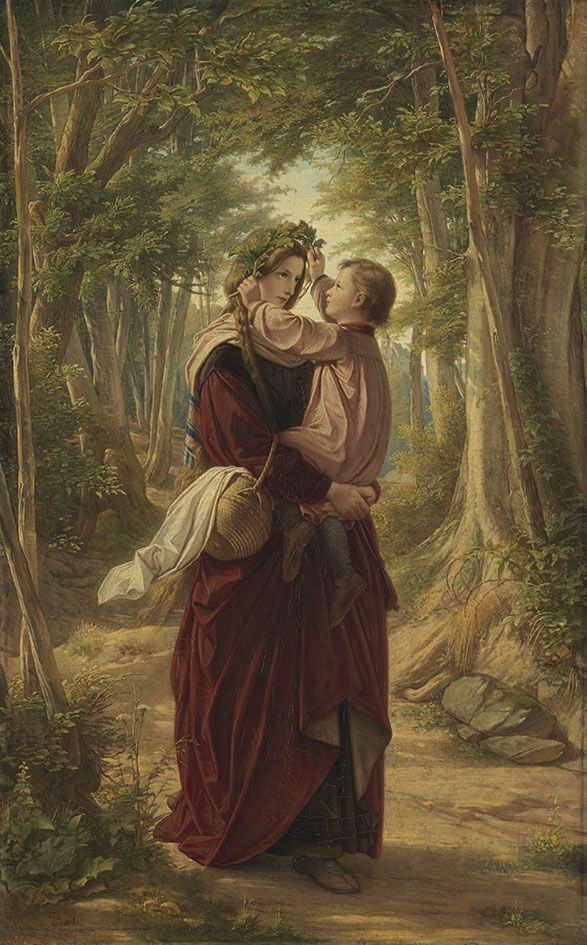
A Mother with Her Child, 1865

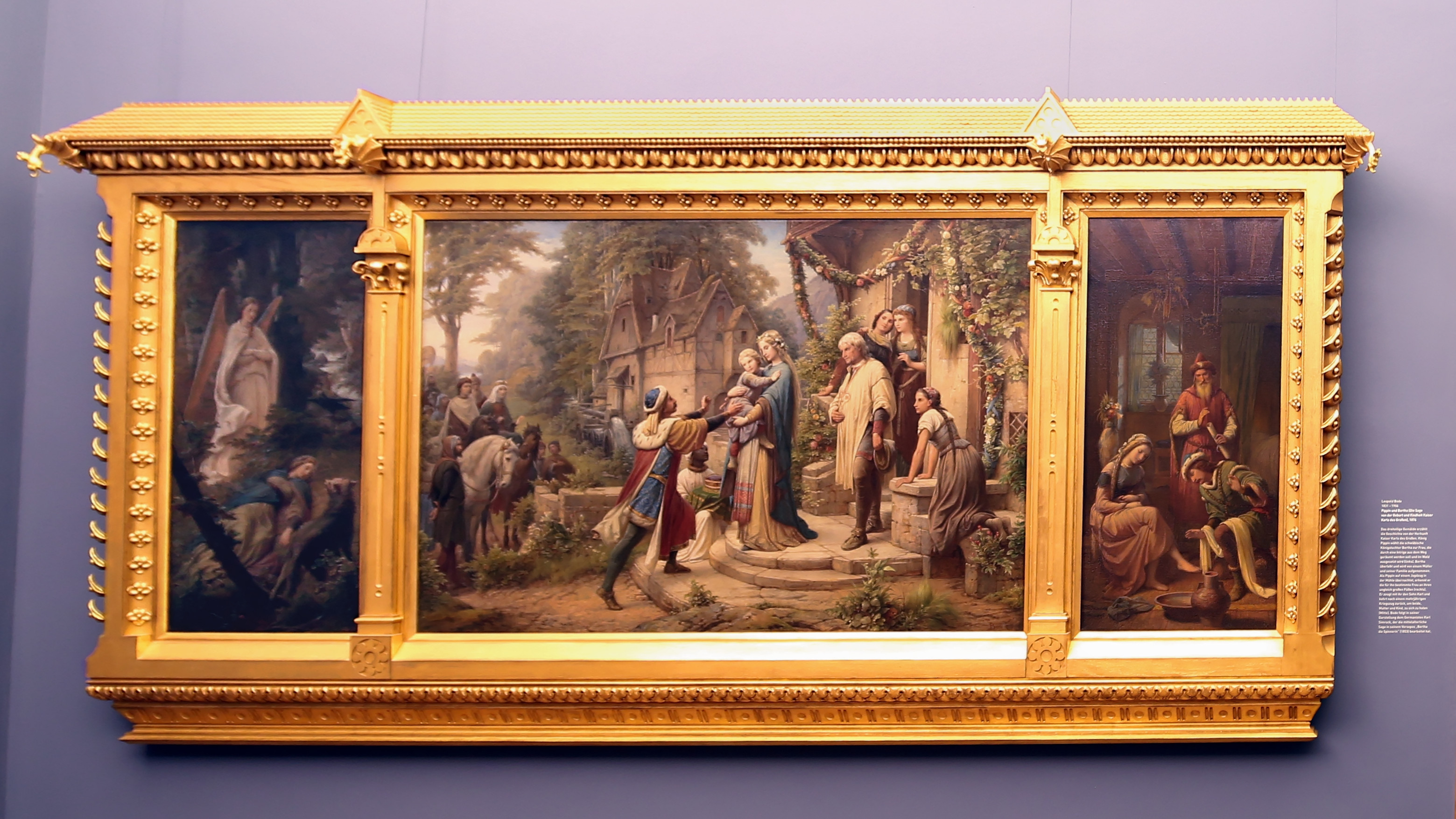
Pippin and Bertha, triptych, 1876

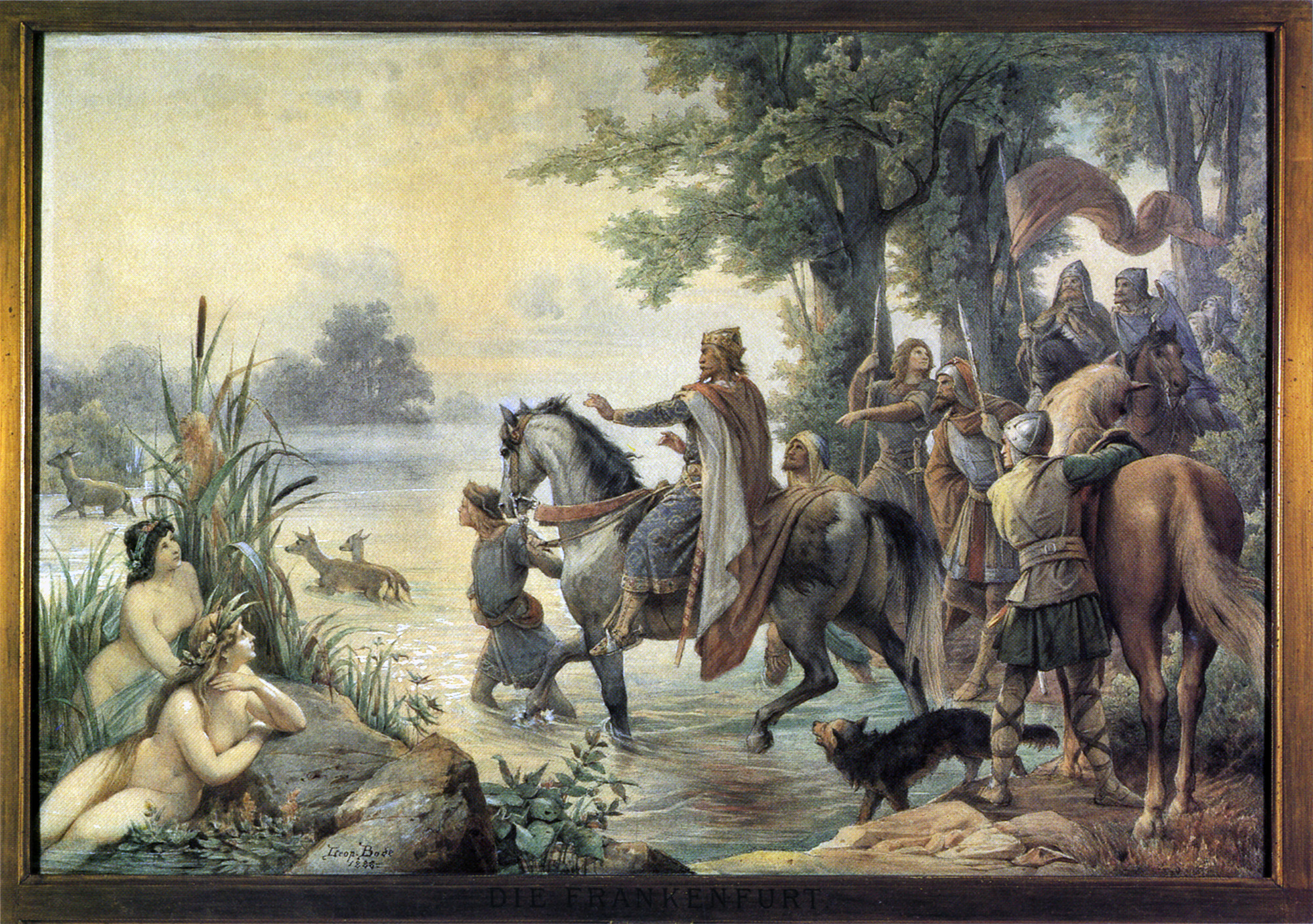
Charlemagne Discovers Frankfurt, watercolor, 1888

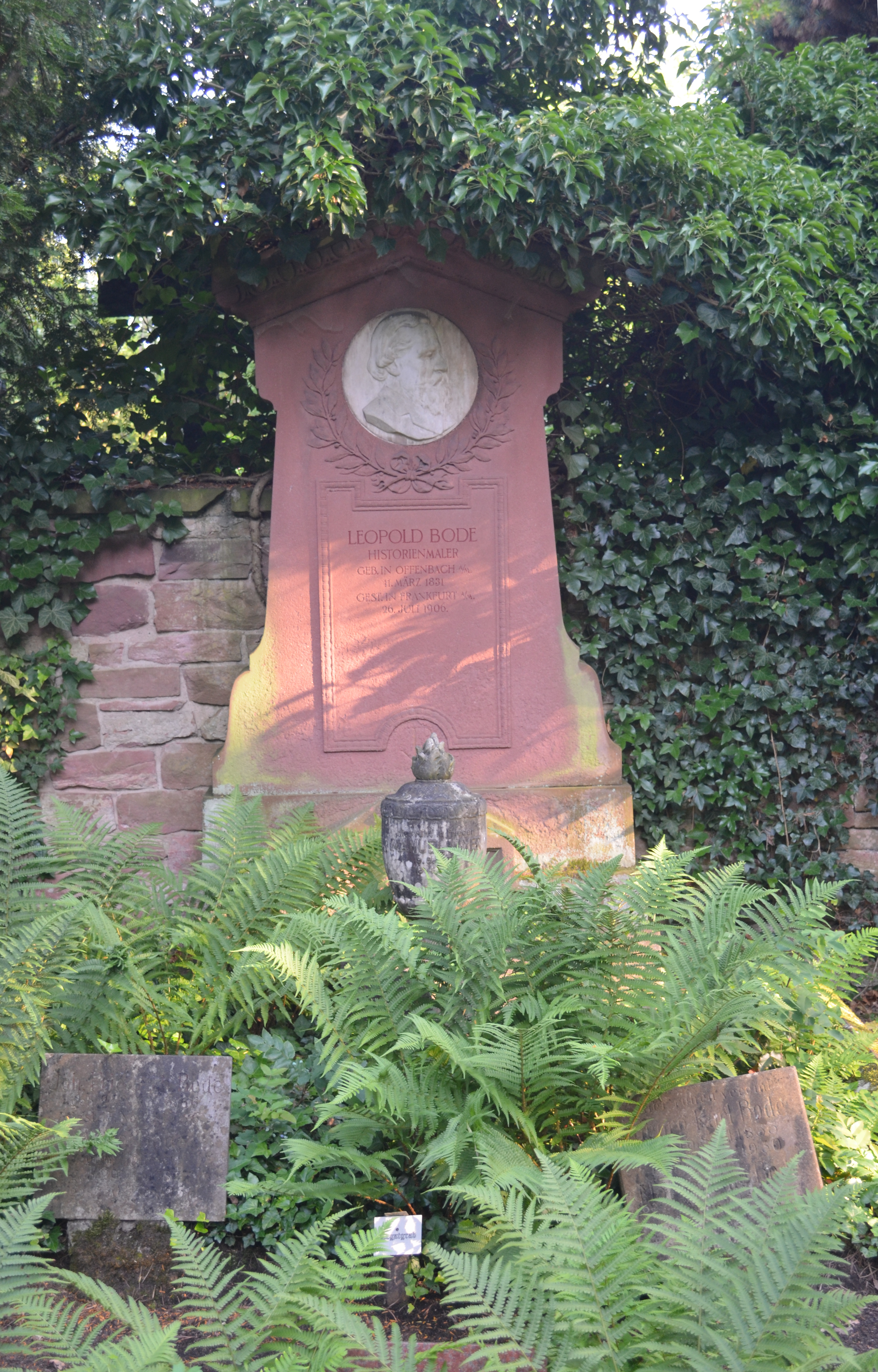
Grave of Leopold Bode, Offenbach Old Cemetery

== See also ==
- List of German painters
