= Aimee Ng =

Canadian art historian and museum curator

- Born: Manila, Philippines
- Education: Queen's University (BFA, 2005); Columbia University (MA, 2006; MPhil, 2008; PhD, 2012)
- Occupations: Art historian, museum curator
- Employer: Frick Collection
- Known for: Scholarship on Italian Renaissance painting, particularly Parmigianino, Renaissance portraiture, and artists displaced by the Sack of Rome
- Title: Peter Jay Sharp Chief Curator
- Term: November 2025–present
- Predecessor: Xavier F. Salomon
- Awards: Medal in Art, Queen's University (2005); Meyerson Award for excellence in teaching

Aimee Ng is a Canadian art historian, curator, author, and podcaster. Her work centers on Italian Renaissance art, with a particular focus on painting, collecting histories, and the interpretation of early modern European art for contemporary audiences.

She is the Peter Jay Sharp Chief Curator at The Frick Collection in New York City, where she has organized exhibitions, contributed to scholarship, and participated in public-facing museum programs.

In 2025, the museum appointed her chief curator, succeeding Xavier Salomon, who became director of the Calouste Gulbenkian Museum in Lisbon, Portugal.

== Early life and education ==
Ng was born in Manila to Philippine-Chinese parents and moved to Canada as an infant before later studying and working in New York.

She graduated from Queen's University at Kingston in 2005 with a BFA, receiving the Medal in Art. After Queen's, she moved to New York City for graduate study at Columbia University, where she developed her specialization in Italian Renaissance art.

She received an MA in 2006, an MPhil in 2009, and a PhD in art history in 2012. Her early academic formation included both studio practice and historical research, a combination later reflected in her curatorial work on Renaissance painting, drawing, and portraiture.

== Career ==
Before joining the Frick Collection, Ng worked at the Morgan Library and Museum and taught art history at Columbia University. Her early curatorial work included The Poetry of Parmigianino's "Schiava Turca", an exhibition organized for the Frick in 2014 that later traveled to the Legion of Honor in San Francisco. The museum appointed her associate curator in 2015, and she later became curator.

At the Frick, Ng's work has included exhibitions, permanent-collection interpretation, publishing, and public programs. She has organized and contributed to projects centered on Renaissance painting and portraiture, including the Frick's presentation of Giovanni Battista Moroni, and has also worked on exhibitions that place Old Master traditions in dialogue with later artists. In 2023, she organized Barkley L. Hendricks: Portraits at the Frick with consulting curator Antwaun Sargent, an exhibition that considered Hendricks's portraits in relation to European painting traditions represented in the Frick's collection.

Along with Chief Curator Xavier F. Salomon, Ng helped shape the 2021 installation of the collection at Frick Madison, the museum's temporary home during the renovation of the Henry Clay Frick House. She described the Madison installation as an opportunity to respond to the Brutalist architecture of the former Whitney Museum of American Art building, using a smaller number of objects and allowing works from the collection to be seen in new spatial relationships.

Ng has also written for The Brooklyn Rail, where her essays have addressed old-master paintings, conservation, and the physical presence of historical works of art.

=== Cocktails with a Curator ===
From April 2020 to July 2021, Ng co-hosted the online program "Cocktails with a Curator" with chief curator Xavier F. Salomon, which examined artwork at the Frick. In this program, they provided virtual museum tours and lectures, while drinking cocktails. The Wall Street Journal characterized the program as "immensely popular" and "reaching an enormous audience".

The program ran for 66 episodes, which are available on YouTube. In 2021, Jason Farago of The New York Times wrote that their show "became appointment viewing at Friday martini hour". That same year, Cocktails with a Curator was named an Honoree in the 25th Annual Webby Awards from the International Academy of Digital Arts and Sciences for Best Virtual & Remote Experiences: Arts & Culture and jointly awarded a Global Fine Arts Award for Best Digital Exhibition or Online Education Program.

In 2022, the book Cocktails with a Curator, by Salomon with Ng and Giulio Dalvit, was published by Rizzoli Electra.

Ng also co-hosted "Travels with a Curator", which had 20 episodes and ran from April 2020 to September 2020. The episodes are also available on YouTube.

== Publications ==
- Ng, Aimee (2014). The Poetry of Parmigianino's Schiava Turca. The Frick Collection, Fine Arts Museums of San Francisco.
- Ng, Aimee (2017). The Pursuit of Immortality: Masterpieces from the Scher Collection of Portrait Medals. New York: The Frick Collection in association with D Giles Limited. ISBN 978-1911282068.
- Ng, Aimee; Galansino, Arturo; Facchinetti, Simone (2019). Moroni: The Riches of Renaissance Portraiture (Hardcover). New York, NY: Frick Collection in association with Scala Arts Publishers, Inc. ISBN 978-1785511851. Catalogue accompanying exhibition at the Frick Collection
- Ng, Aimee; Noelle, Alexander J.; Salomon, Xavier F. (2019). Bertoldo di Giovanni: The Renaissance of Sculpture in Medici Florence (Hardcover). London, United Kingdom: The Frick Collection in association with D Giles Limited. ISBN 9781911282433. Catalogue accompanying exhibition at the Frick Collection
- Kentridge, William; Ng, Aimee (2020). John Constable's White Horse (Frick Diptych). GILES. ISBN 9781911282709.
- Salomon, Xavier, with Aimee Ng and Giulio Dalvit (2022). Cocktails with a Curator: The Frick Collection. New York: Rizzoli Electa. ISBN 9780847872466
- Aimee Ng; Xavier F. Salomon; Stephen Truax (2023). Living Histories: Queer Views and Old Masters. The Frick Collection.
- Daniel Mendelsohn and Aimee Ng (2023). Bronzino’s Lodovico Capponi. The Frick Collection.
- Aimee Ng and Antwaun Sargent (2023). Barkley L. Hendricks: Portraits at The Frick. The Frick Collection.
- Aimee Ng, with Giulio Dalvit and Marie-Laure Buku Pongo (2024). The Frick Collection: Essential Guide. The Frick Collection in association with Paul Holberton Publishing, New York.
- Aimee Ng and Kari Rayner (2026). Gainsborough: The Fashion of Portraiture. The Frick Collection.
- Aimee Ng and Isaac Mizrahi (2026). Gainsborough's Hon. Frances Duncombe. The Frick Collection.
