= Alois Konstantin zu Löwenstein-Wertheim-Rosenberg =

Alois-Konstantin Fürst zu Löwenstein-Wertheim-Rosenberg
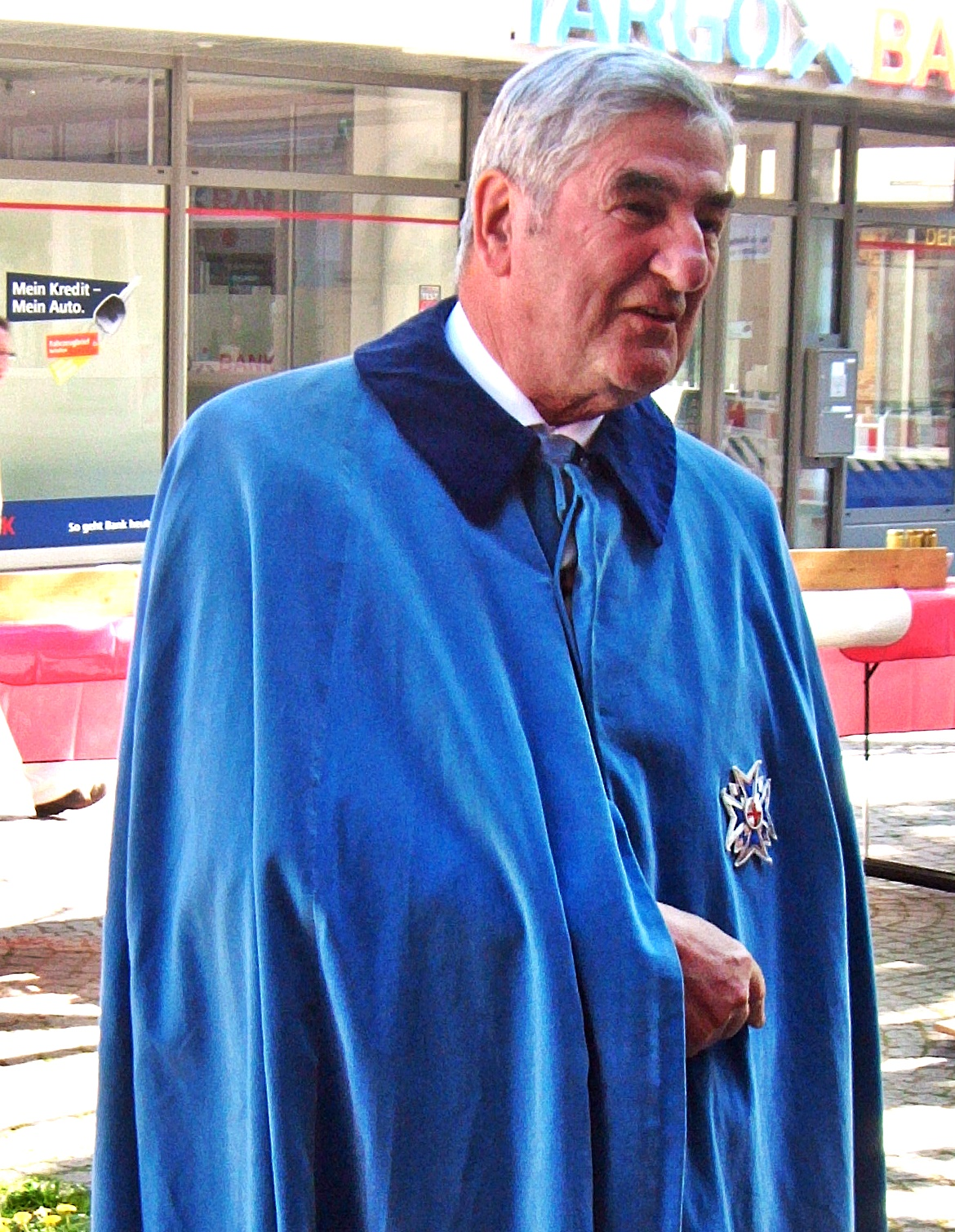
- Alois-Konstantin in 2016

Prince of Löwenstein-Wertheim-Rosenberg
- Period: 23 August 1990-present
- Predecessor: Charles II
- Heir apparent: Nicodemus
- Born: 16 December 1941 (age 84); Würzburg, Bavaria, Nazi Germany
- Spouse: Princess Anastasia of Prussia (m. 1965; died 2026)
- Issue: Leo Löwenstein; Hubertus; Christina; Dominik
Names
- German: Alois Konstantin Karl Eduard Joseph Johann Konrad Antonius Gerhard Georg Benediktus Pius Eusebius Maria
- House: Löwenstein-Wertheim-Rosenberg
- Father: Charles II
- Mother: Carolina dei Conti Rignon
- Religion: Roman Catholic

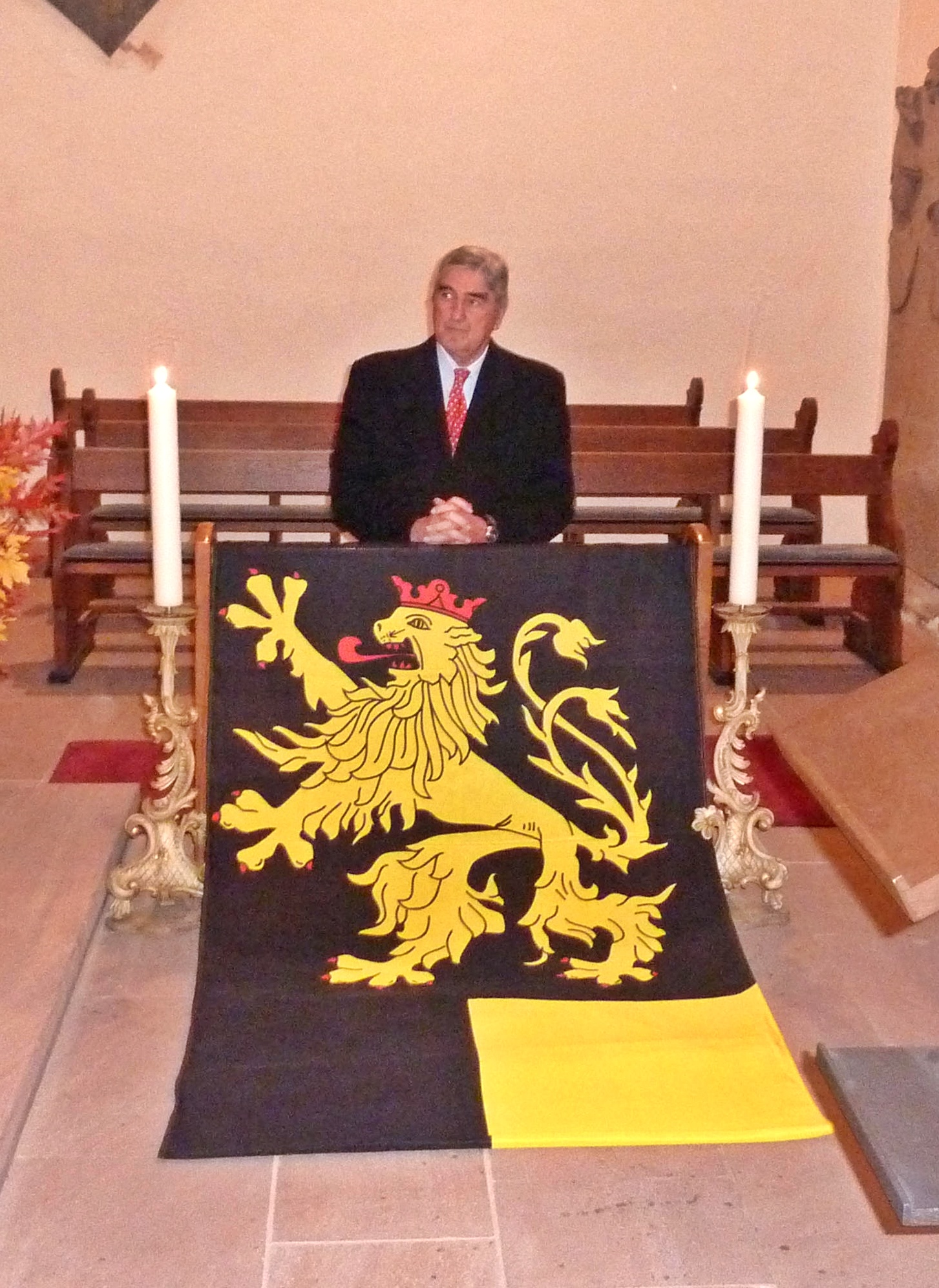
Alois Konstantin Prince zu Löwenstein-Wertheim-Rosenberg as honour-guest during a Catholic Tridentine Mass, celebrated for his ancestors, 2011, in Neustadt an der Weinstraße, Germany

Alois-Konstantin Fürst zu Löwenstein-Wertheim-Rosenberg, full German name: Alois Konstantin Karl Eduard Joseph Johann Konrad Antonius Gerhard Georg Benediktus Pius Eusebius Maria Fürst zu Löwenstein-Wertheim-Rosenberg (born 16 December 1941 in Würzburg, Bavaria) is a German businessman and, since 1990, the head of the mediatised House of Löwenstein-Wertheim-Rosenberg, the Catholic cadet line of the Princes of Löwenstein-Wertheim, itself the patrilineally senior but morganatic branch of the royal house of Wittelsbach, which ruled the Kingdom of Bavaria until 1918. Per German law, he does not possess any noble titles.

== Early life ==
Alois was born in Würzburg, the fifth child and only son of Karl, Prince of Löwenstein-Wertheim-Rosenberg and his wife, Carolina dei Conti Rignon. He had four older sisters, Maria (wife of Joseph, Archduke of Austria), Josephine (wife of Alexander, Prince of Liechtenstein), Monika (wife of Don Jaime Mendez de Vigo y del Arco) and Christiane (wife of Michael, Archduke of Austria), and two younger sisters, Elisabeth-Alexandra (wife of José Maria Trénor y Suarez de Lezo) and Lioba (wife of Moritz Eugen, Prince of Oettingen-Oettingen and Oettingen-Wallerstein). He and his sisters spent their childhood in Bronnbach, and Alois attended school in Miltenberg. He is one of the descendants of Diego Velázquez.

== Career ==
Alois graduated with a degree in law from the University of Würzburg. After working for Gulf Oil in Pittsburgh, he was director of Merck Finck & Co and LGT Bank. He is a commander of the Order of the Holy Sepulchre, a knight of the Order of the Golden Fleece, and a board member of the Papal Foundation Centesimus Annus Pro Pontifice (CAPP). He also served as the director of the Forum of German Catholics' Congress on Joy and Faith.

== Marriage and family ==
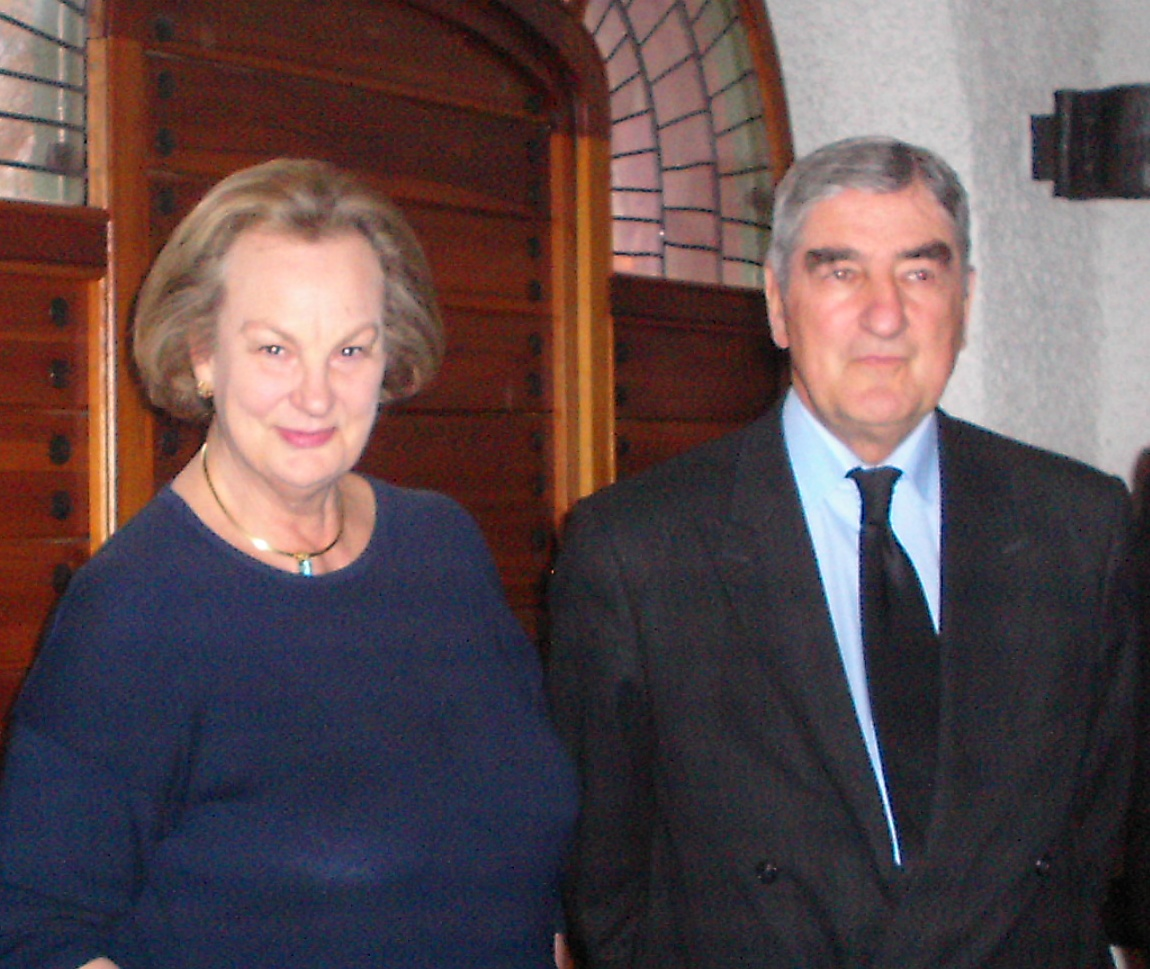
Alois and his wife Anastasia, c. 2010

Alois married Princess Anastasia of Prussia (b. Brieg, 14 February 1944, d. 16 August, 2026), the elder daughter of Prince Hubertus of Prussia, in a civil ceremony in 1965 in Bronnbach, and in a religious ceremony a month later in Erbach. The couple lives at Kleinheubach castle. They had four children:

- Carl Friedrich Hubertus Georg Eduardo Paolo Nicolo Franz Alois Ignatius Hieronymus Maria (1966–2010); married Stephanie von Brenken, They have four children. His son died 2010 in a race car crash competing for the German Nürburgring Langstrecken-Serie.
- Hubertus Maximilian Gabriel Louis Franz Constantin Dominik Wunibald Maria (born 1968); married to Iris von Dornberg
- Christina Maria Johanna Caroline Magdalene Osy Cecilie Hermine Isidora Victoria Anastasia (b. 4 April 1974, Frankfurt). She married Guido von Rohr (b. 27 September 1969, Hanover) on 5 October 2002 in Kleinheubach. They have four children.
- Dominik Wilhelm Christian Nikolaus Sturmius Antonius Charles Benedikt Felix Maria (born 1983); married to Olga zu Castell-Rüdenhausen, They have one son.

They remained married until her death on 16 August 2026 at the age of 82.
