= Rüdenau =

- Municipality
- Coat of arms

- Location of Rüdenau within Miltenberg district
- Interactive map of Rüdenau
- Location within Germany Location within Bavaria
- Coordinates: 49°43′N 9°11′E
- Country: Germany
- State: Bavaria
- Admin. region: Unterfranken
- District: Miltenberg
- Municipal assoc.: Kleinheubach

Government
  - Mayor (2020–26): Monika Wolf-Pleßmann (FW)

Area
  - Total: 4 km^{2} (1.5 sq mi)
- Elevation: 193 m (633 ft)

Population (2025-12-31)
  - Total: 717
  - Density: 180/km^{2} (460/sq mi)
- Time zone: UTC+01:00 (CET)
  - Summer (DST): UTC+02:00 (CEST)
- Postal codes: 63924
- Dialling codes: 09371
- Vehicle registration: MIL
- Website: www.ruedenau.de

Rüdenau (German pronunciation: [ˈʁyːdənaʊ]) is a municipality in the Miltenberg district in the Regierungsbezirk of Lower Franconia (Unterfranken) in Bavaria, Germany and a member of the Verwaltungsgemeinschaft (Administrative Community) of Kleinheubach.

== Geography ==
=== Location ===
Rüdenau lies in the Bavarian Lower Main (Bayerischer Untermain) Region.

The municipality has only the Gemarkung (traditional rural cadastral area) of Rüdenau.

== History ==
On 3 May 1285, the knight Wipert Rüd von Rüdenau donated tithe income in Gönz and Weckbach to the Amorbach Monastery. At this time, then, the village was already in being, and it stayed in the Rüd family's hands until 1635; during this time, they had the valley cleared and vineyards planted.

The Electoral Mainz Amt was assigned in the 1803 Reichsdeputationshauptschluss to the Princes of Leiningen, was mediatized in 1806 by Baden, and in 1810 was ceded to the Grand Duchy of Hesse-Darmstadt. In the Hesse-Bavaria Rezeß (Frankfurt 1816), it finally passed to Bavaria.

=== Population development ===
The figures up to 1950 are drawn from the local chronicle. The 1900 figure is estimated.

Year	Inhabitants
1792	328
1832	432
1900	500
1939	555
1950	646
1970	745
1987	793
2000	868

== Politics ==
The mayor is Monika Wolf-Pleßmann, elected in March 2020.

Municipal taxes in 1999 amounted to €333,000 (converted), of which net business taxes amounted to €27,000.

=== Coat of arms ===
The municipality's arms might be described thus: Gules three bars wavy argent, in chief a dog's head of the second erased gorged sable, in base a sword of the second hilted and pommelled Or per bend sinister.

The dog's head is a canting charge. Although the usual word for “dog” in German is Hund, there is also the word Rüde, and thus this dog's head refers to the noble family of Rüdt who once held sway here, and also for Rüdenau itself. The sword is a reference to the Rüdt family's jurisdiction with regards to the court over which they presided, and also to the place where the Thing was held. The wavy bars are a water symbol. The tinctures argent and gules (silver and red) refer to Electoral Mainz's former hegemony over the area, which ended with the Old Empire's downfall in 1803.

The arms have been borne since 1957.

== Sightseeing ==
- St. Ottilien
- Ottilien-Brunnen (fountain)

== Economy and infrastructure ==
According to official statistics, there were no workers on the social welfare contribution rolls in 1998 working in either producing businesses or trade and transport, but 320 such workers worked from home. There were 2 processing businesses. One business was in construction, and furthermore, in 1999, there were 7 agricultural operations with a working area of 49 ha, of which 38 ha was meadowland.

The distillery of St Kilian has been established in Rüdenau, distilling whisky in the style of Scotch.

=== Education ===
- Kindergarten: The local kindergarten with 47 places is sponsored by Caritas. Classes are in the morning.
- Schools: Primary school and Hauptschule services for Rüdenau are supplied by the Kleinheubach collective school (Verbandsschule) with its branches in Rüdenau and Laudenbach. For further schooling, students mostly go to the Realschule in Miltenberg or the Gymnasien in Miltenberg or Amorbach.
- Higher learning: Tertiary education is to be had nearby at the Fachhochschulen in Aschaffenburg or Darmstadt and the universities in Würzburg or Heidelberg.
