= Xavier Salomon =

British art historian, critic, and curator (born 1979)

Xavier F. Salomon
- Education: Courtauld Institute of Art (PhD)
- Occupation: Art curator
- Employer: Calouste Gulbenkian Museum
- Known for: Scholar of Paolo Veronese
- Title: Director
- Awards: Cavaliere, Order of the Star of Italy (2018); Cross of Merit, Equestrian Order of the Holy Sepulchre of Jerusalem (2025)

Xavier F. Salomon (born 1979) is a British art historian, critic, curator, and museum director. Until November 2025, he was the Deputy Director and Peter Jay Sharp Chief Curator at the Frick Collection in New York.

In 2026, he became the Director of the Calouste Gulbenkian Museum in Lisbon, Portugal.

== Education ==
Salomon was born in Rome, to an English mother and Danish father. He completed his BA, MA, and his PhD in art history at the Courtauld Institute in London, writing his dissertation on the artworks commissioned by Cardinal Pietro Aldobrandini.

== Career ==
Salomon worked at the British Museum and the National Gallery, London, before joining Dulwich Picture Gallery in 2006, where he later became the Arturo and Holly Melosi Chief Curator.

His exhibitions at Dulwich included Best of British: The Story of the British Collection at Dulwich Picture Gallery, Paolo Veronese: The Petrobelli Altarpiece, and an exhibition devoted to Salvator Rosa. He also co-curated Masterpieces of European Painting from Dulwich Picture Gallery, presented at the Frick Collection in 2010.

In 2011, Salomon joined the Metropolitan Museum of Art as Curator of Southern Baroque Paintings in the Department of European Paintings, where he organized exhibitions and conducted research on major works of European art.

Salomon is particularly known for his expertise on the Italian Renaissance painter Paolo Veronese. He curated the National Gallery exhibition Veronese: Magnificence in Renaissance Venice in 2014, the gallery's first major exhibition devoted to the painter. The exhibition followed over four years of negotiations by Salomon and National Gallery director Nicholas Penny to secure major international loans.

At the Frick, Salomon played a leading curatorial role in the museum's temporary relocation to the Breuer Building. The temporary presentation placed the Frick's Old Master paintings and sculpture within the building's modernist architecture.

== Cocktails with a curator ==
From April 2020 through July 2021, Salomon hosted the Frick's online program Cocktails with a Curator with fellow Frick curators Aimee Ng and Giulio Dalvit. The program examined works throughout the Frick's holdings and comprised 66 episodes, which remain available through the museum's website and YouTube channel.

The series subsequently became the basis of a book published by Rizzoli Electa.

== Works ==
=== 2027 ===
- Salomon, Xavier F., and André Aciman. Bellini's St. Francis in the Desert. Forthcoming April 6, 2027.

=== 2026 ===
- Salomon, Xavier F., and Flora Yukhnovich. Boucher’s Four Seasons. 2026.

=== 2025 ===
- Salomon, Xavier F., and Hisham Matar. Goya's Forge. 2025.
- Salomon, Xavier F. Porcelain Garden: Vladimir Kanevsky at The Frick Collection. 2025.
- Salomon, Xavier F. The Frick Collection: The Historic Interiors of One East Seventieth Street. Photographs by Miguel Flores-Vianna. 2025.
- Salomon, Xavier F., Jacques Charles-Gaffiot, and Benoît Constensoux. To the Holy Sepulcher: Treasures from the Terra Sancta Museum. 2025.

=== 2023 ===
- Salomon, Xavier F., and Nicolas Party. Rosalba Carriera's Man in Pilgrim's Costume. 2023.
- Salomon, Xavier F. Bellini and Giorgione in the House of Taddeo Contarini. 2023.
- Salomon, Xavier F., Aimee Ng, and Stephen Truax. Living Histories: Queer Views and Old Masters. 2023.

=== 2022 ===
- Salomon, Xavier F., and Alan Hollinghurst. Fragonard's Progress of Love. 2022.
- Salomon, Xavier F., and Nico Muhly. Paolo Veneziano's Coronation of the Virgin. 2022.
- Salomon, Xavier F., Aimee Ng, and Giulio Dalvit. Cocktails with a Curator: The Frick Collection. 2022.

=== 2021 ===
- Salomon, Xavier F. Frick Madison: The Frick Collection at the Breuer Building. Foreword by Roxane Gay; photographs by Joe Coscia Jr.; texts by Ian Wardropper and Xavier F. Salomon. 2021.

=== 2020 ===
- Salomon, Xavier F., and Francine Prose. Titian's Pietro Aretino. 2020.

=== 2019 ===
- Salomon, Xavier F., and Maira Kalman. Rembrandt's Polish Rider. 2019.
- Salomon, Xavier F., and Christina Currie. David Bowie's Tintoretto: The Lost Church of San Geminiano. 2019.
- Salomon, Xavier F. "An Important Work by Titian Has Been Hiding in Plain Sight." Apollo, 20 September 2019.

=== 2018 ===
- Salomon, Xavier F., and Hilary Mantel. Holbein's Sir Thomas More. 2018.
- Salomon, Xavier F., Guido Beltramini, and Mario Guderzo. Canova's George Washington. 2018.

=== 2017 ===
- Salomon, Xavier F. Veronese in Murano: Two Venetian Renaissance Masterpieces Restored. 2017.
- Salomon, Xavier F., and Letizia Treves. Murillo: The Self-Portraits. 2017.
- Salomon, Xavier F. "D. H. Lawrence among the Etruscans." Apollo, 5 August 2017.

=== 2016 ===
- Salomon, Xavier F. Van Dyck: The Anatomy of Portraiture. 2016.
- Salomon, Xavier F. The Art of Guido Cagnacci. 2016.

=== 2014 ===
- Salomon, Xavier F. Goya and the Altamira Family. 2014.
- Salomon, Xavier F. Veronese. Catalogue of an exhibition at the National Gallery, London. 2014.

=== 2012 ===
- Salomon, Xavier F. Van Dyck in Sicily: 1624–1625: Painting and the Plague. 2012.

=== 2010 ===
- Salomon, Xavier F. Masterpieces of European Painting from Dulwich Picture Gallery. 2010.

=== 2009 ===
- Salomon, Xavier F. Paolo Veronese: The Petrobelli Altarpiece. 2009.

== Honours ==
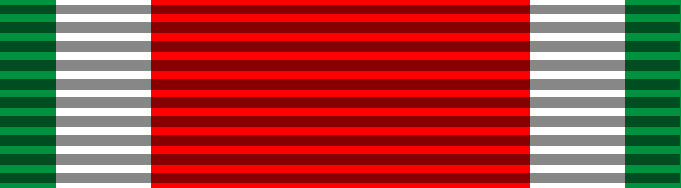
- Cavaliere of the Order of the Star of Italy (2018), for his contribution to promoting Italy's artistic heritage abroad
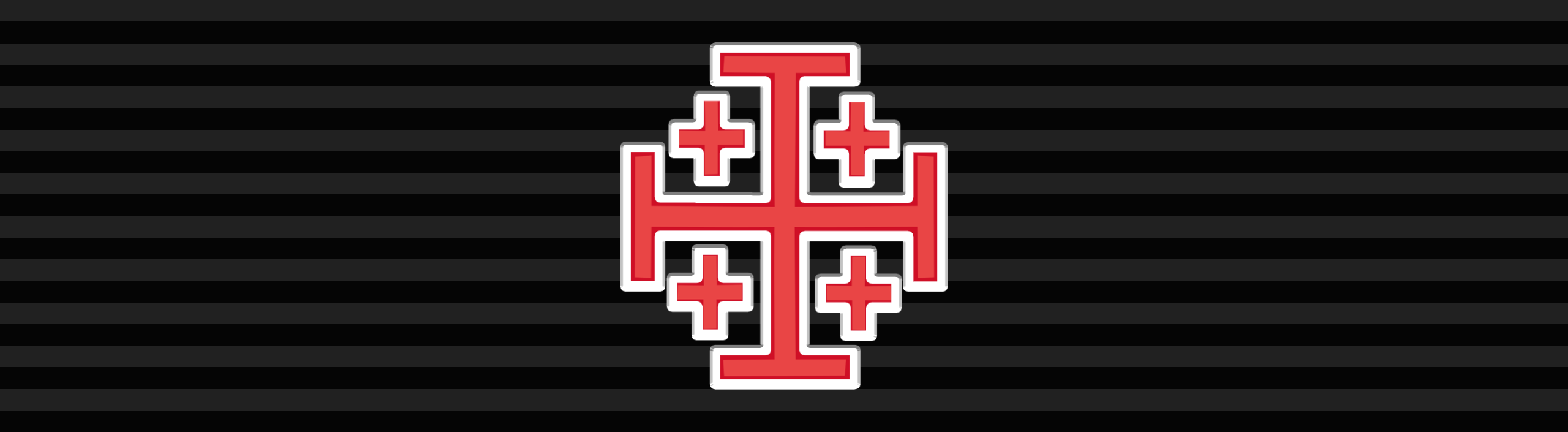
- Cross of Merit (Crucem Ex Merito), Equestrian Order of the Holy Sepulchre of Jerusalem (2025), awarded for his work organizing the exhibition To the Holy Sepulcher: Treasures from the Terra Sancta Museum at the Frick Collection
