= List of Nürburgring fatalities =

Fatal accidents on the Nürburgring motorsport race track in Nürburg, Germany during national and international motor-sport events on the 28.265 kilometres (17.563 mi) Gesamtstrecke ("Whole Course"), the 22.810 km (14.173 mi) Nordschleife ("Northern Loop"), the 7.747 km (4.814 mi) Südschleife ("Southern Loop") and the 2.281 km (1.417 mi) warm-up loop Zielschleife ("Finish Loop") or Betonschleife. From 1984, the new GP-Strecke or Eifelring which was built on the site of the Nürburgring pits complex and part of the Südschleife. This list does not cover fatalities from public sessions.

== List of fatal accidents involving competitors ==
No	Competitor	Date	Course	Section	Race	Event	Machine
1	(Czech Republic) Čeněk Junek	15 July 1928	Nordschleife	Breidscheid/Ex-Mühle		1928 Großer Preis der Sportwagen	Bugatti Type 35B
2	(Germany) Ernst von Halle	16 July 1928	Nordschleife	Kesselchen		1928 Großer Preis der Sportwagen	Amilcar
3	(Germany) Wilhelm Heine	28 Sep 1929	Nordschleife	Steilstrecke	1929 ADAC-Langstreckenfahrt	1929 8 Hour Touring Car Race	BMW
4	(Germany) Heinrich-Joachim von Morgen	27 May 1932	Nordschleife	Hatzenbach	1932 Eifelrennen	Practice	Bugatti T51
5	(Germany) Paul Gründel	3 July 1932	Zielschleife	Südkehre	1932 Westdeutsche Kraftradmeisterschaft	Practice	350cc Impéria
6	(Austria) Emil Frankl	3 June 1934	Nordschleife			1934 Internationales Eifelrennen	Bugatti
7	(Germany) Toni Babl	15 June 1936	Nordschleife		1936 Internationales Eifelrennen	Practice	600cc Douglas Sidecar
8	(Germany) Ernst von Delius	26 June 1937	Nordschleife	Antoniusbuche/Döttinger Höhe	1937 AIACR European Championship	1937 German Grand Prix	Auto-Union Type C
9	(Germany) Alfred Morali	7 Aug 1949	Nordschleife	Aremberg	1949 Großer Preis vom Nürburgring	Practice	500cc Norton
10	(Germany) Theodor Weißenberger	11 June 1950	Nordschleife	Metzgesfeld		1950 Eifelrennen	BMW Veritas
11	(Germany) Günther Schlüter	20 Aug 1950	Nordschleife	Pflanzgarten	1950 German F3 Championship	1950 German Grand Prix	Scampolo 501 - DKW F3
12	(Germany) Josef Hackenberg	25 May 1952	Nordschleife		1952 German Sportscar Championship	1952 Eifelrennen	BMW Veritas RS
13	(Germany) Paul Kresser	28 June 1953	Südschleife/Zielschleife		German Sidecar Championship	1953 Rund um das Bayerkreuz	BMW 500cc Sidecar
14	(Argentina) Onofre Marimón	31 July 1954	Nordschleife	Adenau Bridge	1954 German Grand Prix	Practice	Maserati 250F
15	(Argentina) Ricardo Galvagni	25 June 1955	Nordschleife	Fuchsröhre	1955 German motorcycle Grand Prix	Practice	500cc Norton
16	(Germany) Rudi Godin	3 July 1955	Nordschleife	Pflanzgarten		1955 Rheinlandfahrt für Motorräder	250cc Puch
17	(Germany) Viktor Spingler	28 Aug 1955	Nordschleife	Brünnchen	1955 German Sportscar GT Championship	1955 Internationales Rennen	Porsche 356
18	(Germany) Bernhard Thiel	19 April 1958	Nordschleife	Pflanzgarten	1958 German Rally Championship	1958 Rallye Hanseat	Borgward Isabella
19	(Germany) Erwin Bauer	3 June 1958	Nordschleife		1958 FIA World Sport Car Championship	1958 ADAC 1000 km Nürburgring	Ferrari 250 TR
20	(United Kingdom) Peter Collins	3 Aug 1958	Nordschleife	Pflanzgarten	1958 FIA Formula 1 World Championship	1958 German Grand Prix	Ferrari Dino 246
21	(Switzerland) Fausto Meyrat	9 June 1959	Nordschleife	Kesselchen	1959 FIA World Sports Car Championship	1959 ADAC 1000 km Nürburgring	DKW Auto Union RS 1080
22	(Germany) Alfred Wohlgemuth	30 April 1961	Südschleife/Zielschleife			1961 Internationales Eifelrennen	BMW 500cc Sidecar
23	(United Kingdom) Dickie Dale	30 April 1961	Südschleife/Zielschleife	Bocksberg		1961 Internationales Eifelrennen	500cc Norton
24	(Germany) Günter Strasburger	30 Sep 1962	Südschleife/Zielschleife			1962 ADAC Eifel-Pokal Rennen	BMW 500cc Sidecar
25	(Germany) Michael Rader	14 July 1963	Nordschleife	Schwedenkreuz		1963 Internationales Rennen	Alfa Romeo
26	(Germany) Dieter Schmicking	28 Sep 1963	Südschleife/Zielschleife		1963 Junioren-Pokal	Practice	
27	(Germany) Axel Klaska	28 Sep 1963	Südschleife/Zielschleife		1963 Junioren-Pokal	Practice	
28	(United Kingdom) Brian Hetreed	29 May 1964	Nordschleife	Bergwerk	1964 ADAC 1000 km Nürburgring	Practice	Aston Martin DP214
29	(Germany) Rudolf Moser	30 May 1964	Nordschleife	Antoniusbuche	1964 ADAC 1000 km Nürburgring	Practice	Porsche 904 GTS
30	(Netherlands) Carel Godin de Beaufort	1 Aug 1964	Nordschleife	Bergwerk	1964 FIA Formula 1 World Championship	1964 German Grand Prix	Porsche 718
31	(Germany) Herbert Mandel	25 Sep 1964	Südschleife	Müllenbach	1964 German Sidecar Championship	1964 ADAC Eifelpokal-Rennen	BMW Sidecar 500cc
32	(Luxembourg) Honoré Wagner	23 May 1965	Nordschleife	Kallenhardt	International Championship for Makes	1964 ADAC 1000 km Nürburgring	Alfa Romeo Giulia TZ1
33	(Germany) Manfred König	24 Sep 1965	Südschleife	Müllenbach	1965 ADAC Eifelpokal-Rennen	1965 Junioren-Pokal	BMW 500cc
34	(United Kingdom) John Taylor	7 Aug 1966	Nordschleife	Flugplatz	1966 FIA Formula 1 World Championship	1966 German Grand Prix	Brabham BT11
35	(Germany) Ranier Dangel	16 May 1967	Nordschleife			Regularity Trial	Opel Kadett
36	(Belgium) Georges Berger	23 Aug 1967	Nordschleife	Pflanzgarten		1967 Marathon de la Route	Porsche 911
37	(Netherlands) Albertus Goedemans	30 Aug 1968	Nordschleife	Antoniusbuche	ADAC 500 km-Rennen	Practice	Abarth SP 1000
38	(Germany) Gerhard Mitter	1 Aug 1969	Nordschleife	Flugplatz/Schwedenkreuz	1969 FIA Formula 2	Practice	BMW 269 F2
39	(Germany) Hans-Dieter Fröhle	17 April 1970	Nordschleife	Schwedenkreuz	ADAC 300 km Rennen	Formula Vee ONS Cup	Volkswagen
40	(Germany) Klein	18 April 1970	Nordschleife	Schwedenkreuz	ADAC 300 km Rennen	Practice	Porsche GT
41	(United Kingdom) Robin Fitton	2 May 1970	Nordschleife	Wippermann	1970 World Motor-Cycle Championship	1970 German motorcycle Grand Prix	350cc Norton
42	(Finland) Hans Laine	30 May 1970	Nordschleife	Döttinger Höhe	International Championship for Makes	1970 ADAC 1000 km of Nürburgring	Porsche 908
43	(Germany) Herbert Schultze	12 July 1970	Nordschleife	Hatzenbach	FIA European Touring Car Championship	1970 Nürburgring 6 Hour	Alfa Romeo GTA
44	(Germany) Ulrich Ritkowski	6 Sep 1970	Nordschleife		1970 Junioren-Pokal	1970 Eifelpokalrennen	BMW 500cc
45	(Germany) Herbert Mann	16 Oct 1971	Südschleife		Mayener Rundstreckenrennen	Practice	
46	(Germany) Erich Bertholdt	17 Oct 1971	Südschleife	Müllenbachkurve	Deutsche Strassenmeisterschaft	Mayener Rundstreckenrennen	500cc Kawasaki
47	(Germany) Rüdiger Schwietring	6 Oct 1973	Südschleife	Bocksberg	Meisterschaftslauf für Serien-Motorräder	Sprintrunde	Honda 750cc
48	(Germany) Walter Czadek	31 Aug 1975	Nordschleife	Döttinger Höhe	1975 FIA Worldchampionship GT Cars	1975 Internationales Rennen	BMW 2002 TI
49	(Switzerland) Alex Wittwer	2 April 1976	Nordschleife	Fuchsröhre	1976 FIA European Formula 3 Championship	Practice	March 743 - Toyota F3
50	(Germany) Heinz Behrentin	3 July 1976	Nordschleife		1976 German Reliability Championship		
51	(Germany) Ernst Raetz	9 July 1976	Nordschleife	Flugplatz	1976 Großer Preis der Tourenwagen	1976 Formula Super Vee	Volkswagen Formel Super V
52	(Italy) Corrado Antonello	16 June 1979	Nordschleife	Südkehre	1979 8 Hours of Nürburgring	1979 Laverda Match Race	Laverda
53	(Switzerland) Herbert Müller	24 May 1981	Nordschleife	Kesselchen	1981 FIA World Endurance Championship	1981 ADAC 1000 km Nürburgring	Porsche 908 turbo
54	(Finland) Jorma Nevala	23 Aug 1981	Zielschleife	Pits Straight	1981 Deutsche Motorradmeisterschaft	1981 Deutsche Tourist Trophy	
55	(Germany) Hans Michael Kolb	10 May 1986	GP-Strecke		Deutsche Motorradmeisterschaft		
56	(Germany) Wolfgang Offermann	26 July 1986	Nordschleife	Schwalbenschwanz	VLN-Langstreckenmeisterschaft		Opel Manta GTE
57	(Germany) Karl-Josef Römer	24 Oct 1986	Nordschleife	Döttinger Höhe	VLN-Langstreckenmeisterschaft	1986 VLN – Langstreckenpokal	Porsche Carrera SC
58	(Germany) Wolfgang Scholz	19 Sep 1998	Nordschleife	Breidscheid	VLN-Langstreckenmeisterschaft	1998 VLN – Langstreckenpokal	Volkswagen Golf GTI
59	(Germany) Stefan Eickelmann	10 Oct 1998	Nordschleife	Karussell	VLN-Langstreckenmeisterschaft	1998 DMV-250-Meilen-Rennen	BMW M3 - E36
60	(Germany) Oliver Perschke	25 July 1999	GP-Strecke	Castrol - S	1999 Deutsche Straßenmeisterschaft		
61	(Netherlands) Marc van de Brandeler	5 Sep 1999	Nordschleife		FIA Ferrari Porsche Challenge	1999 Ferrari Porsche Challenge	Porsche 993
62	(Germany) Carola Biehler	12 Aug 2000	Nordschleife/GP-Strecke	Flugplatz/Schwedenkreuz	VLN-Langstreckenmeisterschaft	2000 6 Hour Ruhr-Pokal Rennen	Ford Escort RS2000
63	(Germany) Christian Peruzzi	25 May 2001	Nordschleife/GP-Strecke	Schwedenkreuz/Aremberg		2001 ADAC 24 Hours Nürburgring	Alfa Romeo 147
64	(Germany) Ulli Richter	4 Aug 2001	Nordschleife/GP-Strecke	Döttinger Höhe	VLN-Langstreckenmeisterschaft	2001 VLN 6 Hour Ruhr-Pokal Rennen	Porsche 996 GT3
65	(Germany) Karl-Heinz Deusch	7 July 2002	GP-Strecke	Ford Curve	2002 Motor Racing Legends	2002 Oldtimer Festival	MG J12
66	(Germany) Lutz Barthel	27 June 2004	GP-Strecke	Hatzenbachbogen	2004 Motor Racing Legends	2004 Oldtimer Festival	BMW 328
67	(Switzerland) Hansruedi Portmann	27 Sep 2008	Nordschleife/GP-Strecke	Wehrseifen	2008 ADAC Classic Trophy	2008 ADAC Eifelrennen	Ford Mustang
68	(Germany) Leo Löwenstein	24 April 2010	Nordschleife/GP-Strecke	Bergwerk	2010 VLN-Langstreckenmeisterschaft	2010 ADAC ACAS H&R Cup	Aston Martin V8 Vantage
69	(Germany) Wolf Silvester	22 June 2013	Nordschleife/GP-Strecke	Schwalbenschwanz	2013 VLN-Langstreckenmeisterschaft	44th Adenauer ADAC Simfy Trophy	Opel Astra OPC
70	(Finland) Juha Miettinen	18 April 2026	Nordschleife/GP-Strecke	Klostertal/Kurve Steilstrecke	2026 Nürburgring Langstrecken-Serie	2026 ADAC 24h Nürburgring Qualifiers	BMW 325i

== List of fatal accidents involving spectators ==
No	Name	Date	Course	Section	Race	Event	Role
1	(Netherlands) Andy Gehrmann	28 March 2015	Nordschleife/GP-Strecke	Flugplatz	VLN Endurance Championship	61. ADAC Westfalenfahrt	Spectator

== List of fatal accidents involving race officials ==
No	Official	Date	Course	Place	Series	Race	Role
1	(Germany) Guenther Schneider	6 Aug 1963	Nordschleife	Flugplatz	FIA Formula 1 World Championship	1963 Großer Preis von Deutschland/ 1963 German Grand Prix	Red Cross Volunteer
2	(Germany) Berdt Hackenbert	23 April 1977	Nordschleife	Pflanzgarten	VLN-Langstreckenmeisterschaft	1977 Internationale ADAC Ahr Eifel 5 Hours	Marshal
3	(Germany) Klaus Bierth	8 June 1979	Nordschleife	Pit-Lane Entrance	VLN-Langstreckenmeisterschaft	1979 ADAC 4 Hour Großer Preis der Tourenwagen	Marshal

== List of fatal accidents during unofficial testing ==
No	Competitor	Date	Course	Place	Series	Event	Machine
1	(Germany) Hermann Schmitz	8 Oct 1936	Nordschleife	Karussell	Daimler-Benz Racing School	Private Test	Mercedes-Benz 500K
2	(Germany) Gustav Adolf Baumm	23 May 1955	Nordschleife	Wippermann	Test of "Flying Hammock" NSU before exhibition at Eifelrennen	Private Test	Baumm - NSU 125cc
3	(Germany) Erich Bode	20 June 1961	Nordschleife	Fuchsröhre	German Formula Junior Championship	Private Test	Mitter - DKW
4	(Germany) Hans-Dieter Blatzheim	14 June 1985	GP-Strecke	Castrol-S	Historic Sports Cars	Private Test	Porsche 917/10
5	(Germany) Marc Theis	6 May 2002	GP-Strecke	Audi Chicane	Formula König Championship	Private Test	Formula König
6	(Luxembourg) Christian Franck	9 August 2023	Nordschleife	Tiergarten	GoodYear Tire private test	Private Test	Porsche 911 Carrera S
7	Unidentified	9 August 2023	Nordschleife	Tiergarten	GoodYear Tire private test	Private Test	Porsche 911 Carrera S
