= Kleinheubach (Verwaltungsgemeinschaft) =

- Verwaltungsgemeinschaft
- Location of Kleinheubach within Miltenberg district
- Interactive map of Kleinheubach
- Location within Germany Location within Bavaria
- Coordinates: 49°43′N 9°13′E
- Country: Germany
- State: Bavaria
- Admin. region: Lower Franconia
- District: Miltenberg
- Seat: Kleinheubach
- Subdivisions: 3 municipalities

Area
  - Total: 18.43 km^{2} (7.12 sq mi)

Population (2025-12-31)
  - Total: 5,787
  - Density: 314.0/km^{2} (813.3/sq mi)
- Time zone: UTC+01:00 (CET)
  - Summer (DST): UTC+02:00 (CEST)
- Website: vgem.kleinheubach.de

Kleinheubach is a Verwaltungsgemeinschaft (municipal association) in the district of Miltenberg in Bavaria, Germany. Its seat is in Kleinheubach.

It consists of the following municipalities:

1. Kleinheubach
2. Laudenbach
3. Rüdenau
