= Miguel Flores-Vianna =

Argentine photographer

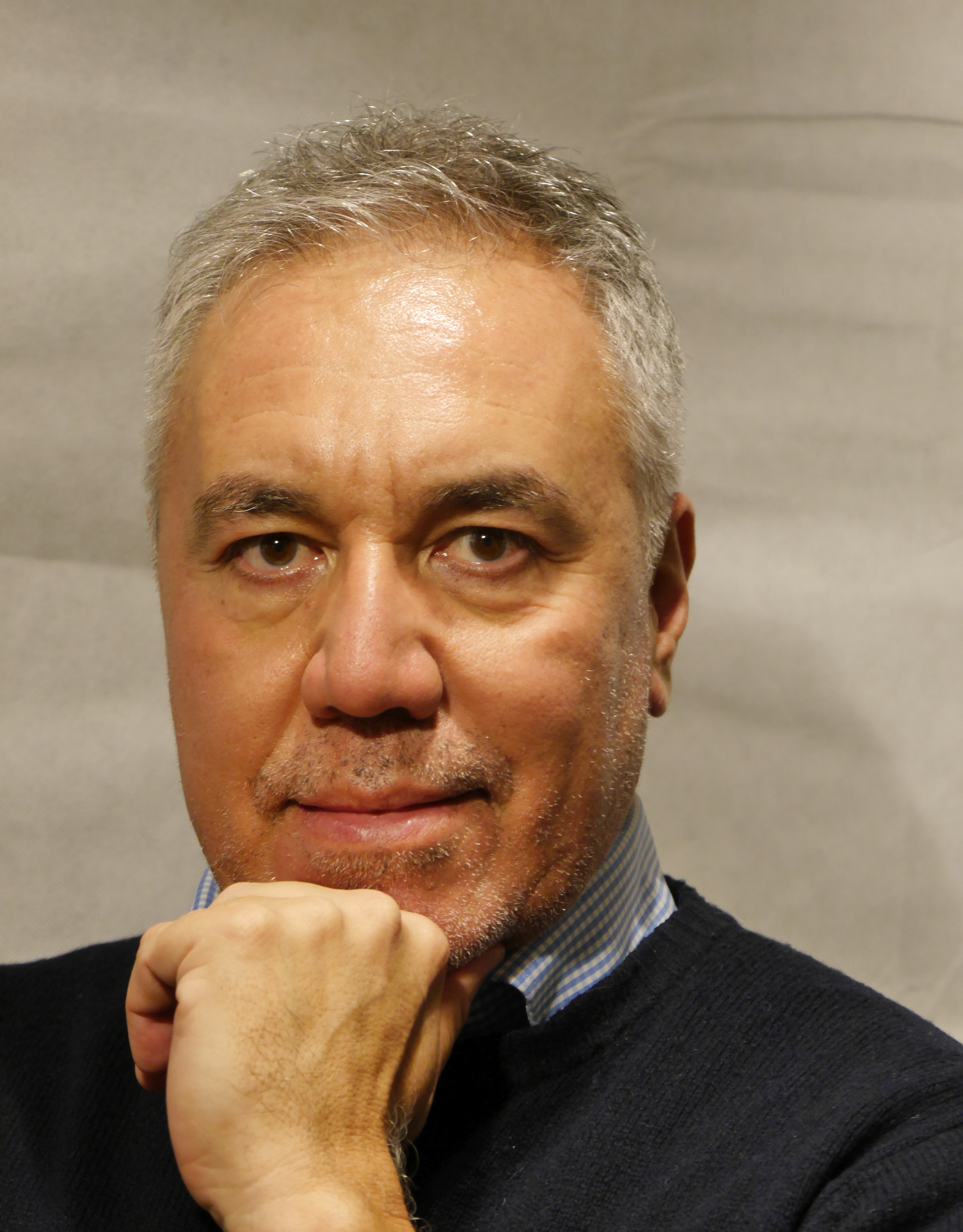
Flores-Vianna in 2019

Miguel Flores-Vianna is an Argentine photographer, best known for architecture and interiors. He has worked for publications including Cabana and Architectural Digest.

Flores-Vianna was born in Argentina, and lives in London.

== Publications ==
- Haute Bohemians, Vendome Press, 2017
- A Wandering Eye: Travels with My Phone, Vendome Press, 2019
- Xavier Salomon, with photographs by Miguel Flores-Vianna. The Frick Collection: The Historic Interiors of One East Seventieth Street. Rizzoli Electa, 2025.
