= Giulio Dalvit =

Italian art historian and museum curator (born 1991)

- Born: Milan, Italy
- Education: University of Milan (BA); Courtauld Institute of Art (MA, PhD)
- Occupations: Art historian, curator
- Employer: The Frick Collection
- Known for: Scholar of Renaissance art, Vecchietta and 15th-century Sienese art

Giulio Dalvit (born 1991) is an Italian scholar, art historian, and curator. He is the Associate Curator at The Frick Collection in New York City. A specialist in Renaissance art, he is best known for his research on the multi-media master Vecchietta.

In tandem with his research on the Renaissance, his curatorial work at the Frick includes projects and publications with contemporary artists. He regularly teaches at Columbia University and the Institute of Fine Arts of New York University (NYU).

== Education and career ==
Dalvit studied humanities at the University of Milan and completed a master's degree and a doctorate in art history at the Courtauld Institute of Art. His doctoral dissertation, supervised by Scott Nethersole, examined the Sienese artist Vecchietta.

The recipient of several academic grants, including the Francis Haskell Memorial Scholarship, Dalvit has also conducted advanced research as a guest researcher at the University of Amsterdam (2019) and as a visiting fellow at the Kunsthistorisches Institut in Florenz (2021–22).

Early in his career, he worked at the Museo Poldi Pezzoli in Milan and subsequently held research and teaching positions at the University of Amsterdam, University College London (UCL), and the Courtauld.

=== The Frick Collection ===
Dalvit first undertook research at the Frick Collection in 2016, contributing to exhibitions on Bartolomé Esteban Murillo, Antonio Canova, and Giovanni Battista Tiepolo. He joined the museum staff in 2021. Under Chief Curator Xavier F. Salomon, he co-curated the installation of the permanent collection at Frick Madison inside the Marcel Breuer building on Madison Avenue, the museum's temporary home during the renovation of its buildings. He later co-curated the reinstallation of the collection upon its return to the renovated historic mansion on Fifth Avenue, which reopened to the public in 2025.

He is also the head of the Stephen K. and Janie Woo Scher Center for the Study of Commemorative Medals, established at the Frick.

From April 2020 to July 2021, during the pandemic, Dalvit co-hosted the Frick's weekly digital broadcasting program Cocktails with a Curator alongside Salomon and Aimee Ng. The 65-episode series was named an honoree at the 2021 Webby Awards and was adapted into a book published by Rizzoli Electa in 2022, co-authored by the three curators with an introduction by Simon Schama.

== Exhibitions and museum projects ==
- Siena: The Art of Bronze, 1450–1500 [curator]. The Frick Collection, New York, 2026–2027.
- Il Vecchietta e Siena [curator]. Santa Maria della Scala, Siena, 2025–2026.
- Fra Angelico [contributor]. Palazzo Strozzi, Florence, 2025–2026.
- Frick Madison [co-curator, with X. F. Salomon and A. Ng]. Reinstallation of the entire Frick Collection, New York, 2021–2024.
- The Eveillard Gift [co-curator, with X. F. Salomon and A. Ng]. The Frick Collection, New York, 2022–2023.
- Louis XV. Passions d'un roi [contributor]. Château de Versailles, 2022–2023.
- Propagazioni: Giuseppe Penone at Sèvres [curator]. The Frick Collection, New York, 2022.
- The Art of Experiment: Parmigianino at The Courtauld [contributor]. Courtauld Gallery, London, 2022.
- Bernardino Luini e i suoi figli [contributor]. Palazzo Reale, Milan, 2014.

== Vecchietta and Siena ==
Dalvit is the author of Vecchietta (2025), published by The Frick Collection and Paul Holberton Publishing in both English and Italian editions. It represents the first full-length monograph devoted to the artist since a short study by Giorgio Vigni in 1937. The book examines Vecchietta's multimedia output as a painter, sculptor, architect, and metalworker. In connection with the publication, Dalvit curated the 2025–2026 rearrangement of the Santa Maria della Scala complex in Siena to re-contextualize the artist's works within the site.

== Selected publications ==
Dalvit has published peer-reviewed studies on Renaissance painting, sculpture, iconography, and artistic practice in international journals including The Burlington Magazine, Art History, the Journal of the Warburg and Courtauld Institutes, Master Drawings, Mitteilungen des Kunsthistorischen Institutes in Florenz, Renaissance Studies and Prospettiva. He also sits on the scientific committee of Rassegna di Studi e di Notizie, the peer-reviewed annual journal of the museums of the Castello Sforzesco in Milan.

=== Books and catalogues ===
- Siena: The Art of Bronze, 1450–1500. New York: The Frick Collection, 2026.
- Lorenzo Ghiberti, I commentarii. New critical edition and English translation, with Scott Nethersole, Cecilia Panti and Nicholas Temple, 2025.
- Vecchietta. London and New York: Paul Holberton Publishing, in association with The Frick Collection, 2025.
- Angelico. Exhibition catalogue, edited by Carl Brandon Strehlke. Florence: Palazzo Strozzi / Marsilio Arte, 2025.
- The Frick Collection: Essential Guide, with Aimee Ng and Marie-Laure Buku Pongo. New York: The Frick Collection, in association with Paul Holberton Publishing, 2024.
- Marcello Maloberti: Metal Panic. Exhibition catalogue, texts by Diego Sileo, Giulio Dalvit and Luca Cerizza. Milan: PAC – Padiglione d'Arte Contemporanea and Silvana Editoriale, 2024.
- The Eveillard Gift. Exhibition catalogue, edited with Aimee Ng and Xavier F. Salomon. New York: The Frick Collection, 2022.
- Louis XV. Passions d'un roi. Exhibition catalogue, edited by Yves Carlier and Hélène Delalex. Paris: Château de Versailles, 2022.
- (With E. Peyton) Titian's Man in a Red Hat. New York: The Frick Collection, 2022.
- The Art of Experiment: Parmigianino at The Courtauld. Exhibition catalogue, edited by Ketty Gottardo and Guido Rebecchini. London: Courtauld Gallery and Paul Holberton Publishing, 2022.
- Propagazioni: Giuseppe Penone at Sèvres. New York: The Frick Collection, 2022.
- (With X. F. Salomon and A. Ng) Cocktails with a Curator: The Frick Collection. New York: Rizzoli Electa, 2022.
