= Antwaun Sargent =

American art critic, writer, and curator

Antwaun Sargent (born 1988) is an American writer, editor and curator, living in New York City. His writing has appeared in The New York Times, The New Yorker and various art publications. Sargent is the author of The New Black Vanguard: Photography between Art and Fashion (Aperture) and the editor of Young, Gifted and Black: A New Generation of Artists (DAP). He has championed Black art and fashion by young Black photographers, and has built a youth culture around it. He is also a director at Gagosian Gallery.

== Career ==
Sargent was born and raised in Chicago. He became interested in art and photography from visiting museums at a very young age. He graduated from Georgetown University with a Bachelors of Science in Culture and Politics in 2011. He also holds a master's degree in Education from the Relay Graduate School of Education.

Sargent started out teaching kindergarten in New York for Teach for America. He has written for The New York Times, The New Yorker, Surface, and Interview. He has also written essays for numerous museum and gallery publications and catalogues about Arthur Jafa, Derrick Adams, Ed Clark and Mickalene Thomas. He has lectured and spoken in public forums at the Brooklyn Museum, The Studio Museum of Harlem, Harvard University, and Yale University. He also appeared in the Gucci podcast and gave a TEDx Talk on the importance of Black art.

In 2019 he published his first book and curated an accompanying exhibition at Aperture Foundation, The New Black Vanguard, in which he showcased the works of 15 young black photographers, including Tyler Mitchell, Awol Erizku and Nadine Ijewere. Sargent shone light on how their works blur the boundaries between art, fashion, and photography. In 2020 he edited Young, Gifted and Black: A New Generation of Artists, a book that explores the artistic production of artists including Erick Mack, Jordan Casteel and Kevin Beasley. He also curated the exhibition Just Pictures at projects+gallery that year in Saint Louis, Missouri.

In early 2021 he was appointed one of the directors and curators of Gagosian Gallery, with a focus on the relationship between art, desires, identities, and representation.

== Publications ==
- Sargent, Antwaun, et al. Young, Gifted and Black: A New Generation of Artists: The Lumpkin-Boccuzzi Family Collection of Contemporary Art. D.A.P., 2020.
- Sargent, Antwaun, Addy Campbell, et al. The New Black Vanguard: Photography Between Art and Fashion. Illustrated, Aperture, 2019.
