= Prince Hubertus of Prussia =

German prince (1909–1950)

Prince Hubertus
- Born: 30 September 1909; Marmorpalais, Potsdam, German Empire
- Died: 8 April 1950 (aged 40); Windhoek, South West Africa
- Burial: 15 April 1950; Hohenzollern Castle, Württemberg-Hohenzollern, West Germany
- Spouse: Baroness Maria Anna von Humboldt-Dachröden (m. 1941; div. 1943) Princess Magdalena Reuss of Köstritz (m. 1943)
- Issue: Anastasia, Princess of Löwenstein-Wertheim-Rosenberg; Princess Marie Christine
Names
- Hubertus Karl Wilhelm
- House: Hohenzollern
- Father: Wilhelm, German Crown Prince
- Mother: Duchess Cecilie of Mecklenburg-Schwerin

Prince Hubertus Karl Wilhelm of Prussia (30 September 1909 – 8 April 1950) was the third son of Crown Prince Wilhelm of Germany and Duchess Cecilie of Mecklenburg-Schwerin, and member of the princely House of Hohenzollern.

== Biography ==
He joined the army in 1934 (infantry regiment 8 in Frankfurt/Oder) and participated in the Invasion of Poland in 1939. One year later he was dismissed from the army by Hitler's Prinzenerlaß, following the death of his elder brother Prince Wilhelm of Prussia, who was wounded in France in May 1940 and later died in a field hospital in Belgium.

=== Marriage and issue ===
On 29 December 1941, he married Baroness Maria Anna Sybilla Margaretha von Humboldt-Dachröden (9 July 1916 – 24 September 2003) in Oels, Schlesien. They divorced a little over a year later in early 1943 (the same year she would later give birth to Hubertus' first cousin Ernest Augustus of Hanover's illegitimate son), and on 5 June of that year, he married again to Princess Magdalena Reuss of Köstritz (20 August 1920 – 10 October 2009). They had two daughters:

- Princess Anastasia Victoria Cecilia Hermine of Prussia (14 February 1944 - 16 August 2026); married Alois-Konstantin, 9th Prince of Löwenstein-Wertheim-Rosenberg and had issue.
- Princess Marie Christine of Prussia (18 July 1947 – 29 May 1966); died from injuries resulting from a car accident.

Prince Hubertus died of appendicitis on 8 April 1950 at Windhoek, South West Africa. He was buried in Hohenzollern Castle.

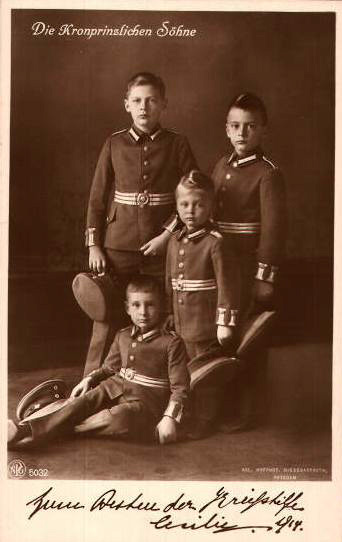
Prince Hubertus (at bottom) with his brothers, 1914

== Ancestry ==
Ancestors of Prince Hubertus of Prussia

8. Frederick III, German Emperor
4. Wilhelm II, German Emperor
9. Victoria, Princess Royal
2. Wilhelm, German Crown Prince
10. Frederick VIII, Duke of Schleswig-Holstein
5. Princess Augusta Victoria of Schleswig-Holstein-Sonderburg-Augustenburg
11. Princess Adelheid of Hohenlohe-Langenburg
1. Prince Hubertus of Prussia
12. Frederick Francis II, Grand Duke of Mecklenburg-Schwerin
6. Frederick Francis III, Grand Duke of Mecklenburg-Schwerin
13. Princess Augusta Reuss of Köstritz
3. Duchess Cecilie of Mecklenburg-Schwerin
14. Grand Duke Michael Nikolaevich of Russia
7. Grand Duchess Anastasia Mikhailovna of Russia
15. Princess Cecilie of Baden
