= Order of the Holy Sepulchre =

Order of the Holy Sepulchre or Equestrian Order of the Holy Sepulchre may refer to:

- Order of the Holy Sepulchre (Catholic), chivalric order belonging to the Holy See (the Catholic Church)
- Order of the Holy Sepulchre (Orthodox), chivalric order belonging to the Greek Orthodox Patriarchate of Jerusalem

== See also ==
- Brotherhood of the Holy Sepulchre (Greek Orthodox)
- Custody of the Holy Land (Franciscan)
- Greek Orthodox Patriarchate of Jerusalem
- Latin Patriarchate of Jerusalem
