= Laudenbach, Bavaria =

Laudenbach
- Municipality
- Coat of arms

- Location of Laudenbach within Miltenberg district
- Interactive map of Laudenbach
- Location within Germany Location within Bavaria
- Coordinates: 49°44′45″N 9°10′34″E
- Country: Germany
- State: Bavaria
- Admin. region: Unterfranken
- District: Miltenberg
- Municipal assoc.: Kleinheubach

Government
  - Mayor (2020–26): Stefan Distler

Area
  - Total: 4.94 km^{2} (1.91 sq mi)
- Elevation: 127 m (417 ft)

Population (2025-12-31)
  - Total: 1,462
  - Density: 296/km^{2} (767/sq mi)
- Time zone: UTC+01:00 (CET)
  - Summer (DST): UTC+02:00 (CEST)
- Postal codes: 63925 (formerly 8761)
- Dialling codes: 09372
- Vehicle registration: MIL
- Website: www.laudenbach-am-main.de

For other places with the same name, see Laudenbach (disambiguation)

Laudenbach (German pronunciation: [ˈlaʊdn̩bax]) is a municipality in the Miltenberg district in the Regierungsbezirk of Lower Franconia (Unterfranken) in Bavaria, Germany and a member of the Verwaltungsgemeinschaft (Administrative Community) of Kleinheubach.

== History ==
Since 1315 Laudenbach was owned by the imperial barons of Fechenbach. In the course of the reorganization of Germany under Napoleon, the place came to the Grand Duchy of Hesse in 1810. With a contract of January 29, 1817, Laudenbach, together with the towns of Umpfenbach, Windischbuchen and Reichartshausen, came to the Kingdom of Bavaria in exchange for Dorndiel, Mosbach and Radheim from the Grand Duchy of Hesse. In 1862 the Miltenberg district office was formed, on whose administrative area Laudenbach was located. During the Nazi Germany Regime, Laudenbach was one of 31 communities which were assigned in the so called 'Landkreis' of Miltenberg. On July 1, 1972, this merged with the district of Obernburg am Main to form the new district of Miltenberg.

== Geography ==
=== Location ===
Laudenbach lies right on the Bavarian Lower Main between Miltenberg and Obernburg, and borders on the Odenwald.

It is relatively well linked to the highway network by Bundesstraße 469. The Frankfurt Rhine Main Region’s hub can be reached quickly by car or train.

=== Neighbouring communities ===
The next community down the Main is Klingenberg am Main, and the next one upstream is Kleinheubach.

=== Amalgamations ===
The hamlet of Brunnthal in Hessen, which belongs to Michelstadt’s outlying centre of Vielbrunn, is co-administered by Laudenbach.

=== Population development ===
There has been a slight rise in the community's population over the last few years owing mainly to the opening of new building areas, such as Sommerberg II, Bocksberg.

== Politics ==
=== Community council ===
The council is made up of 12 council members with seats apportioned thus:

- CSU 4 seats
- SPD 2 seats
- Freie Wähler 6 seats

=== Mayor ===
Currently in office is Stefan Distler, elected in 2020.

=== Coat of arms ===
The community's arms might be described thus: A bend sinister wavy azure, in chief barry of six Or and gules, in base argent a buffalo's attire sable.

The wavy bend sinister stands for the community's namesake brook. The stripes are drawn from the arms once borne by the Counts of Rieneck. They sold their holdings in Laudenbach in 1315 to the Barons of Fechenbach, who then, in 1385, enfeoffed the Counts with the holding. After they died out in 1559, the community passed to Electoral Mainz. The Barons of Fechenbach died out in their male line in 1892. The buffalo's horn is drawn from their arms. Both these elements symbolize former hegemony.

The arms have been borne since 1970.

== Culture and sightseeing ==
=== Music ===
- Musikverein Harmonie Laudenbach
- Sängerlust Laudenbach
- The Gospeltrain

=== Buildings ===
- Schloss Laudenbach (castle)

=== Parks ===
Schlosspark Laudenbach

=== Natural monuments ===
A giant tree in the Schlosspark is the oldest living thing in the Miltenberg district.

=== Regular events ===
- Parish and Kindergarten Festival in summer
- Football club's Village Festival in summer
- Singing Club's Johannisfeuer (Midsummer Festival)
- Music Club's May Day celebration

=== Education ===
There is a primary school-Hauptschule within the Kleinheubach/Laudenbach/Rüdenau school association.
