= Löwenstein Castle =

Coordinates: 49.7193°N 9.2185°E

- Schloss Löwenstein
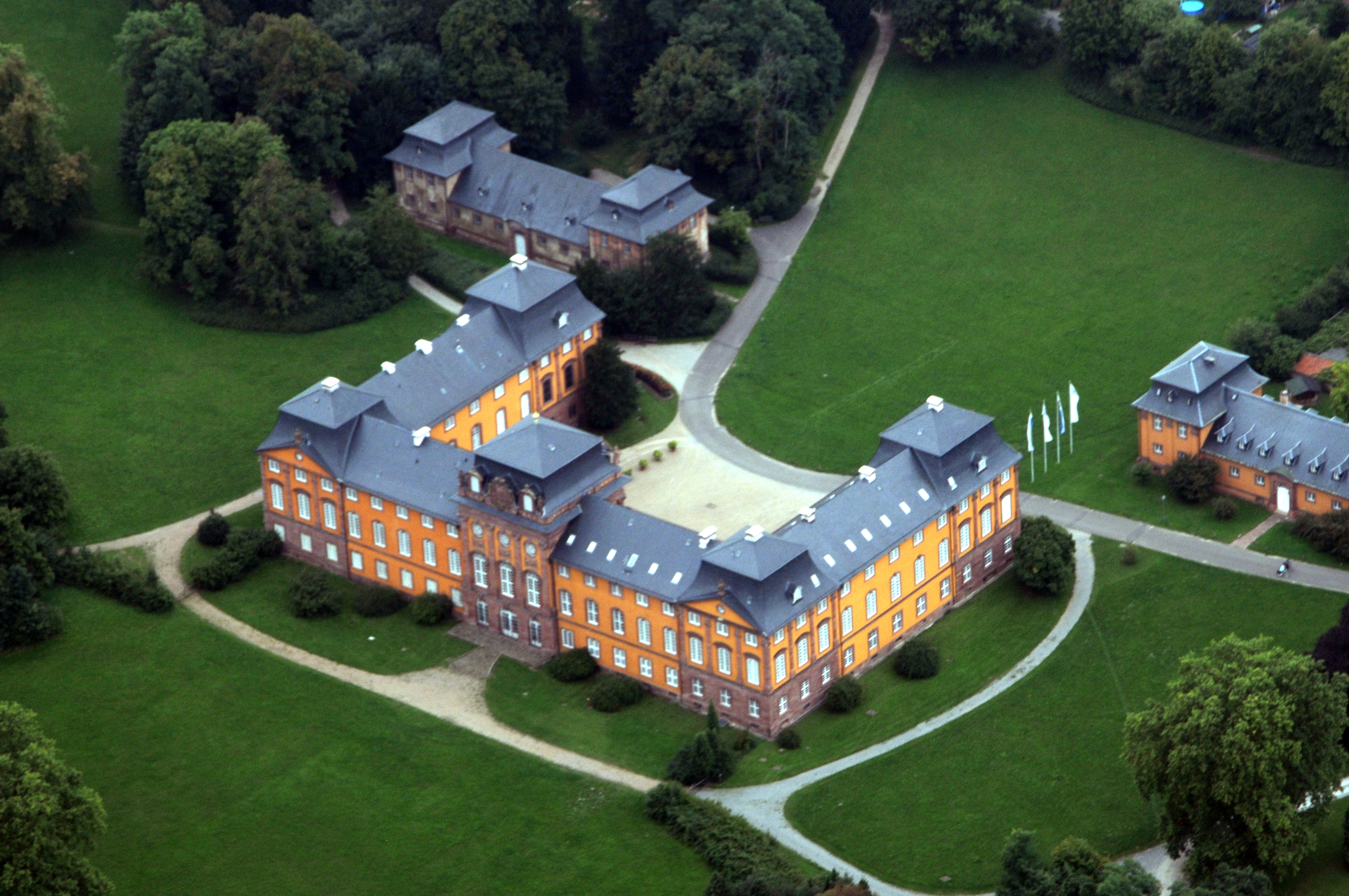
- Interactive map of the Löwenstein Castle area
- Alternative names: Kleinheubach Castle, Schloss Kleinheubach

General information
- Architectural style: Late Baroque
- Location: Kleinheubach, Germany
- Construction started: 1721
- Completed: 1732

Design and construction
- Architect: Louis Remy de la Fosse

Website
- https://www.loewenstein.de

Löwenstein Castle (not to be confused with the ruined medieval castle of the same name in Löwenstein, Germany) is a Late Baroque style castle built in the eighteenth century in Kleinheubach, Germany.

== History ==
Prince Dominic Marquard of Löwenstein-Wertheim-Rochefort acquired lordship over Kleinheubach in 1721 from Frederick Charles, Count of Erbach-Limpurg. Although this acquisition came with a castle, Dominic Marquard began construction on a new castle that same year, employing the skills of the architect Louis Remy de la Fosse and the sculptor Jakob van der Auwera. Overseen by Johann Dientzenhofer and (after Dientzhenhofer's death in 1726) Rinscher of Mannheim, construction came to completion in 1732.

Although the castle was built in a Late Baroque style, later expansions—such as a greenhouse in 1780, servant's quarters in 1807–1824, and a riding hall in 1870—were built in a classical style. In 1870, the castle's chapel was also painted in Nazarene style by Eduard von Steinle, Ferdinand Becker, and Leopold Bode.

Currently, the castle remains in the ownership of Dominic Marquard's descendants, who both reside there and operate it as a conference hotel.
