= Eduard von Steinle =

Austrian artist (1810–1886)

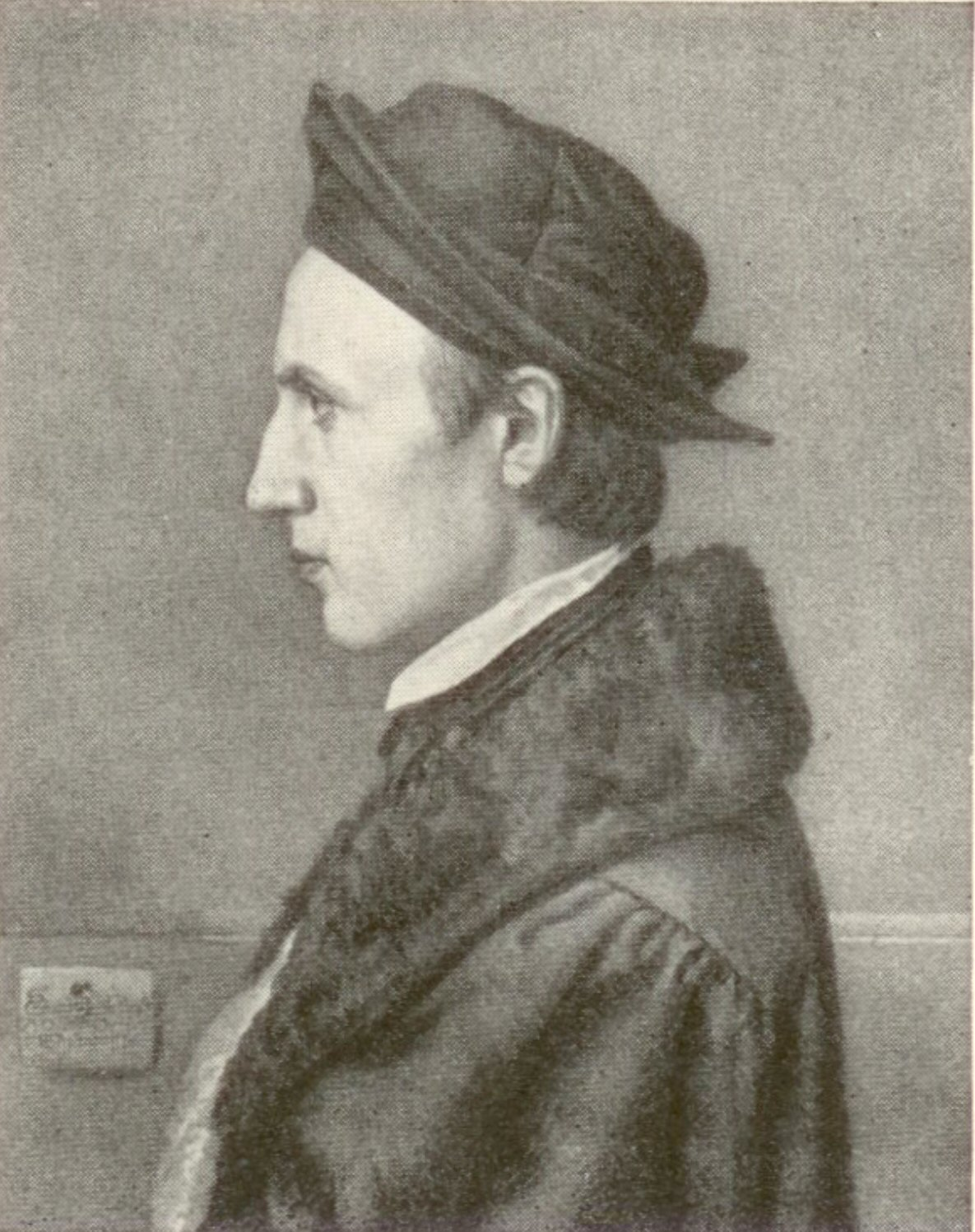
Eduard Jakob von Steinle (1810-1886), lithograph by V. Schertle (1846)

Eduard von Steinle (2 July 1810 – 16 September 1889) was a painter and a printmaker. He was born in 1810 in Vienna, Austria and died in 1889 in Frankfurt, Germany. He spent 1828-33 in Rome with similar artists from the Nazarene school before returning to Vienna in 1873. Frederic Leighton studied under him.

Steinlestrasse in Frankfurt-am-Main is named after him.
