= Kleinheubach =

- Municipality
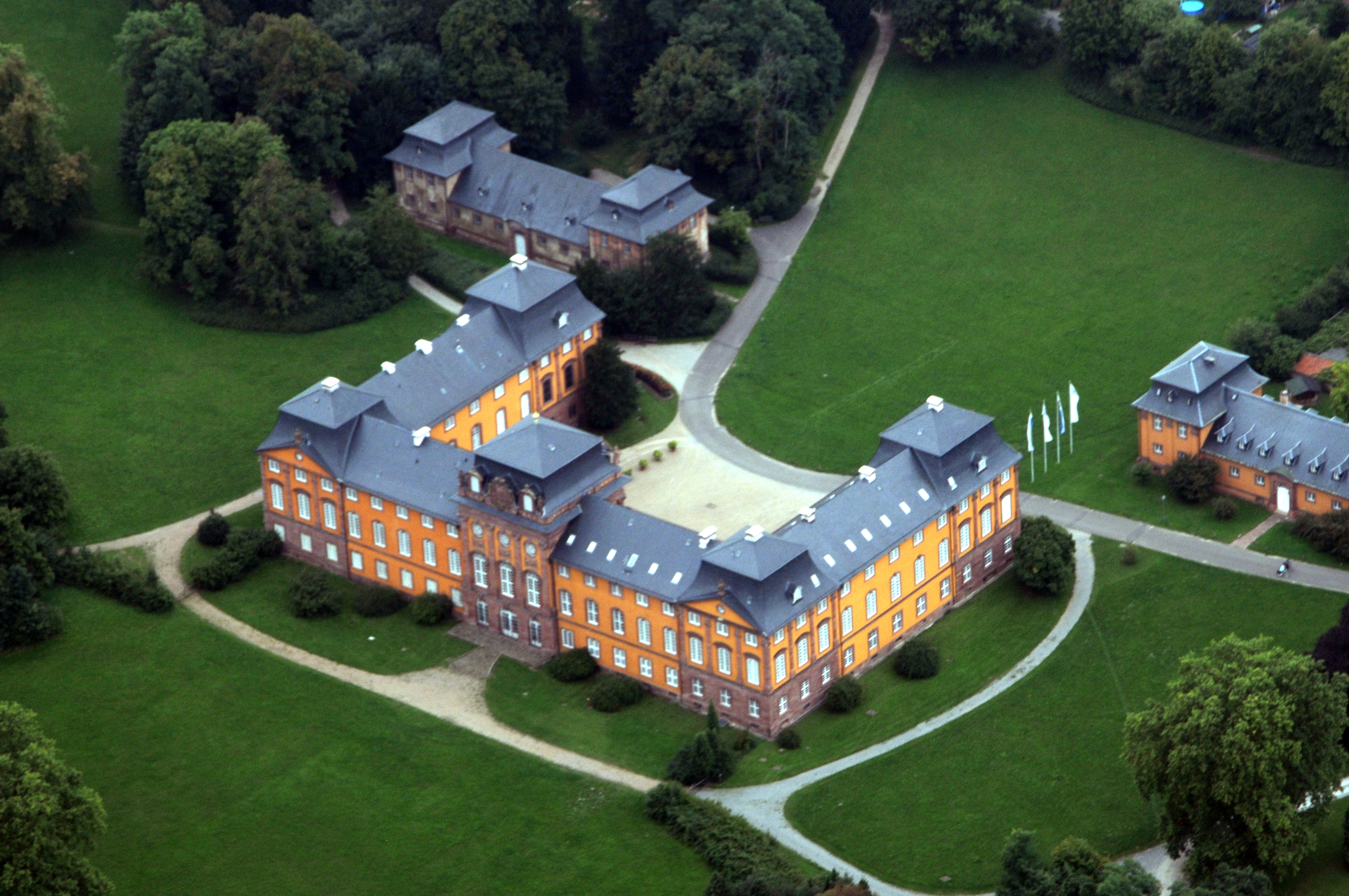
- Schloss Löwenstein, residence of the Princes of Löwenstein-Wertheim-Rosenberg since 1720

- Coat of arms

- Location of Kleinheubach within Miltenberg district
- Interactive map of Kleinheubach
- Location within Germany Location within Bavaria
- Coordinates: 49°43′22″N 09°12′52″E
- Country: Germany
- State: Bavaria
- Admin. region: Unterfranken
- District: Miltenberg
- Municipal assoc.: Kleinheubach

Government
  - Mayor (2020–26): Thomas Münig (SPD)

Area
  - Total: 9.49 km^{2} (3.66 sq mi)
- Elevation: 128 m (420 ft)

Population (2025-12-31)
  - Total: 3,608
  - Density: 380/km^{2} (985/sq mi)
- Time zone: UTC+01:00 (CET)
  - Summer (DST): UTC+02:00 (CEST)
- Postal codes: 63924
- Dialling codes: 09371
- Vehicle registration: MIL
- Website: www.kleinheubach.de

Kleinheubach is a market municipality in the Miltenberg district in the Regierungsbezirk of Lower Franconia (Unterfranken) in Bavaria, Germany and the seat of the like-named Verwaltungsgemeinschaft (municipal association). As of the 2011 census, it has a population of around 3,614.

== Geography ==
=== Location ===
Kleinheubach lies between the Spessart and Odenwald ranges, on the left bank of the Main. Across the river lies Grossheubach, linked to Kleinheubach by a bridge. Upstream the closest town is Miltenberg. The municipal territory touches on the state of Hesse in the far west.

=== Neighbouring communities ===
Kleinheubach borders on (from the north, clockwise): Grossheubach, Miltenberg, Rüdenau, Michelstadt (in Hesse) and Laudenbach.

== History ==
Like many other towns in Germany, Kleinheubach had a vibrant Jewish community for many centuries. The Jewish community became organized in the second half of the 17th century and built synagogue and cemetery, and in the early 1900s also built a school. Their synagogue was desecrated on Kristallnacht (9 November 1938).

Since 1976, Kleinheubach has been associated with Laudenbach and Rüdenau in a Verwaltungsgemeinschaft (municipal association).

== Government ==
=== Community council ===
The council is made up of 17 council members, counting the mayor.

	CSU	SPD	FW	Total
2008	6	5	6	17 seats

(as at municipal election held on 2 March 2008)

=== Mayors ===
Thomas Münig was elected mayor in 2020.

Second Mayor Gerald Hornich

Third Mayor Thomas Bissert

Former mayors:

- Jakob Zink: 1933–1945
- Heinrich Jäger: 1946–1966
- Heinrich Morgenroth: 1966–1968
- Theodor Lippert: 1968–1978
- Bernhard Holl: 1978–1990
- Kurt Schüßler: 1990–2008
- Stefan Danninger: 2008–2020

=== Coat of arms ===
The community’s arms might be described thus: Argent on a mount of three Or a lion rampant gules armed and langued of the second.

The lordship of Kleinheubach passed after the Counts of Rieneck died out in 1559 to the Counts of Erbach, and again in 1731, through sale, to the Princes of Löwenstein-Wertheim-Rosenberg. At the time of sale, the Princes had to promise that this Protestant place would be allowed unhindered to keep the Augsburg Confession even under their Catholic rule. They had a stately palace built by Johann Dientzenhofer on the site of the former castle, which is still owned by the family today. The lion is taken from this princely family’s arms, in a somewhat simplified form, as it has appeared there since about 1518. The market community’s seal is known from imprints between 1810 and 1840, and shows the same composition, although the lion is in some cases on flat ground rather than the “mount of three” (or Dreiberg, as this device is called in German heraldry).

The arms have been borne since the 19th century.

== Attractions ==
- Löwenstein Castle, palace of the Princes of Löwenstein-Wertheim-Rosenberg

== Infrastructure ==
=== Transport ===
Bundesstraße 469 runs through the community's territory. Kleinheubach is located on the Main Valley Railway.

== Notable people ==
=== Sons and daughters of the town ===
- Joseph von Schork (7 December 1829 – 25 January 1905), Roman Catholic Archbishop of the Archbishopric of Bamberg from 1890 to 1905
- Wilhelm Kahl (17 June 1849 – 14 May 1932 in Berlin), German scholar of jurisprudence and politician (DVP), Member of the Reichstag, President of the Deutscher Juristentag
- Miguel Januário, 22nd Duke of Braganza (19 September 1853 –11 October 1927), Portuguese exiled royal and pretender to the throne.
- Aloys, 7th Prince of Löwenstein-Wertheim-Rosenberg (15 September 1871 – 25 January 1952), German nobleman and politician
- Karl II, 8th Prince of Löwenstein-Wertheim-Rosenberg (8 February 1904 – 23 August 1990), German nobleman
- Helmut Kahlert (7 June 1927 – 25 January 2009 in Furtwangen), social scientist and clock historian
- Princess Adelaide (3 April 1831 – 3 December 1909 in Ryde), Princess of Luxembourg
- Torsten Fenslau (23 April 1964 – 6. November 1993 in Darmstadt), music producer and disc jockey
