= Aloys II of Liechtenstein =

Prince of Liechtenstein from 1836 to 1858

Aloys II
- Duke of Troppau and Jägerndorf; Count of Rietberg
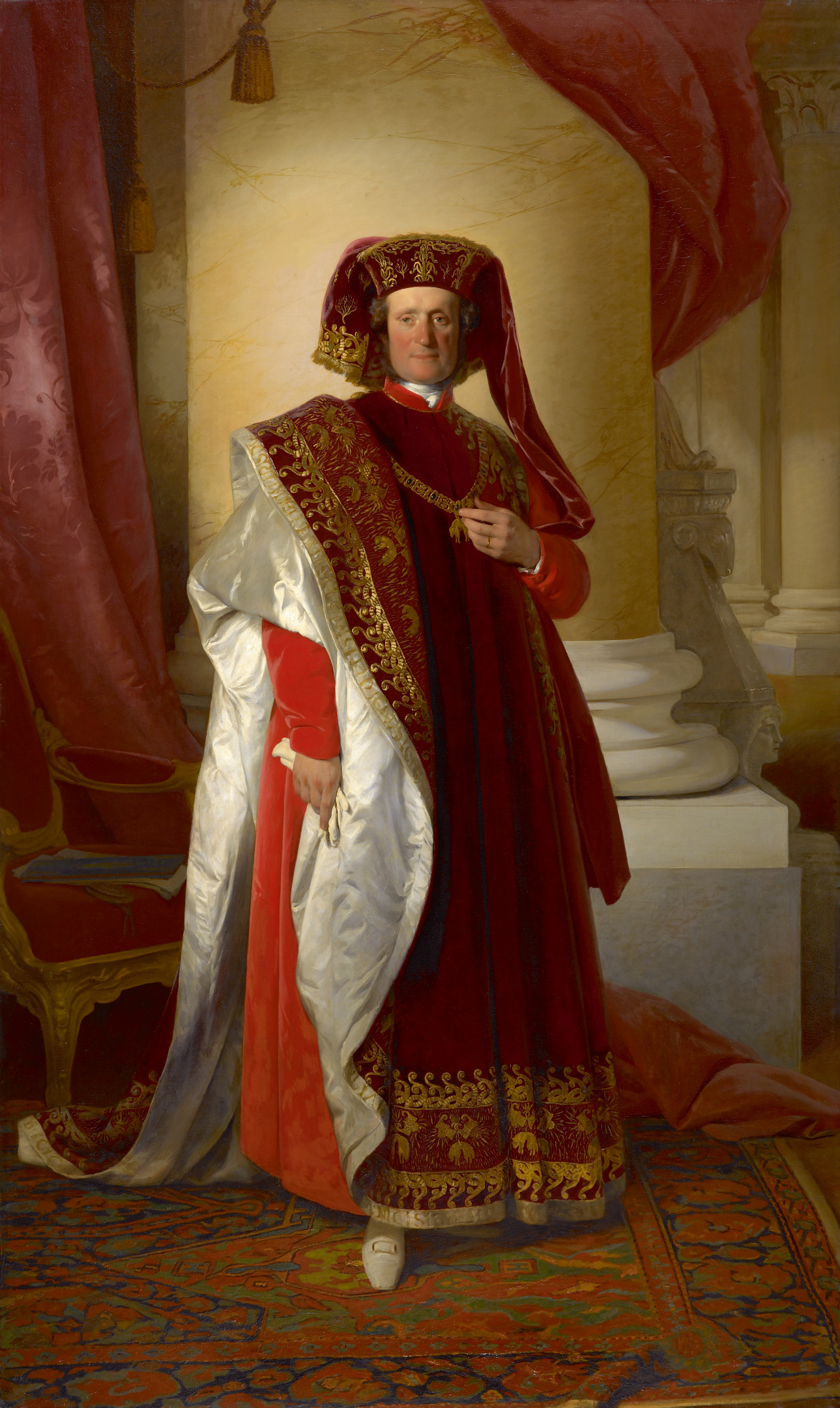
- Aloys II in the vestments of the Order of the Golden Fleece, by Friedrich von Amerling, 1845

Prince of Liechtenstein
- Reign: 20 April 1836 – 12 November 1858
- Predecessor: Johann I
- Successor: Johann II
- Born: 26 May 1796; Vienna, Archduchy of Austria, Holy Roman Empire
- Died: 12 November 1858 (aged 62); Eisgrub, Margraviate of Moravia, Austrian Empire
- Burial: Church of the Nativity of the Virgin Mary, Brno
- Spouse: Countess Franziska Kinsky of Wchinitz and Tettau (m. 1831)
- Issue among others...: Sophie, Princess of Löwenstein-Wertheim-Rosenberg; Johann II, Prince of Liechtenstein; Henriette, Princess Alfred of Liechtenstein; Theresa, Princess Arnulf of Bavaria; Princess Aloysia, Countess of Fünfkirchen; Franz I, Prince of Liechtenstein
Names
- Aloys Maria Josef Johann Baptista Joachim Philipp Nerius
- House: Liechtenstein
- Father: Johann I Joseph, Prince of Liechtenstein
- Mother: Landgravine Josefa of Fürstenberg-Weitra
- Religion: Roman Catholic

Aloys II (Aloys Maria Josef Johann Baptista Joachim Philipp Nerius; 25/26 May 1796 – 12 November 1858) was the sovereign Prince of Liechtenstein from 20 April 1836 until his death in 1858.

He was a son of Johann I Joseph, Prince of Liechtenstein, and Landgravine Josefa of Fürstenberg-Weitra, and a nephew of Prince Aloys I. Aloys II married Countess Franziska Kinsky of Wchinitz and Tettau and had two sons and nine daughters with her, with their two sons later ruling Liechtenstein as Johann II and Franz I. Aloys contributed actively to Liechtenstein's economic and political development.

== Early life ==
Prince Aloys was born in Vienna to Prince Johann I Joseph of Liechtenstein and Landgravine Josefa of Fürstenberg-Weitra. His father was at the time of his birth a colonel in the Austrian army, and since became a field marshal before becoming the ruling prince of Liechtenstein in 1805. Aloys at the same time became the heir apparent.

== Marriage and issue ==
Aloys married Countess Franziska Kinsky of Wchinitz and Tettau (Vienna, 8 August 1813 – Vienna, 5 February 1881) on 8 August 1831 in Vienna. They had 11 children; nine daughters and two sons:

- Princess Marie Franziska de Paula Theresia Josepha (Vienna, 20 September 1834 – Vienna, 1 December 1909), married in Vienna on 29 October 1860 Count Ferdinand of Trauttmansdorff-Weinsberg (Vienna, 27 June 1825 – Schloss Fridau, 12 December 1896), and had issue
- Princess Carolina Maria Josepha Walpurgis Nestoria (Vienna, 27 February 1836 – Vienna, 28 March 1885), married in Vienna on 3 June 1855 Alexander Fürst von Schönburg-Hartenstein (Vienna, 5 March 1826 – Vienna, 1 October 1896), and had issue
- Princess Sophie Marie Gabriele Pia (Vienna, 11 July 1837 – Schloss Fischhorn, 25 September 1899), married in Vienna on 4 May 1863 as his second wife Charles, Prince of Löwenstein (Haid, 21 May 1834 – Köln, 8 November 1921), 1,067th Knight of the Order of the Golden Fleece in Austria, and had issue
- Princess Aloysia Maria Gabriela Hyppolita (Eisgrub, 13 August 1838 – Vienna, 17 April 1920), married in Vienna on 22 May 1864 Heinrich Graf von Fünfkirchen (Schloss Fünfkirchen, 25 January 1830 – Vienna, 2 January 1885), without issue
- Princess Ida Maria Lamberta Theresia Franziska de Paula (Eisgrub, 17 September 1839 – Libejic, 4 August 1921), married in Vienna on 4 June 1857 Adolf Joseph 8th Fürst zu Schwarzenberg (Vienna, 18 March 1832 – Libejic, 5 October 1914), 1,092nd Knight of the Order of the Golden Fleece in Austria, and had issue
- Johann II, Prince of Liechtenstein (1840–1929)
- Princess Franziska Xaveria Maria David (Vienna, 30 December 1841 – Vienna, 13 May 1858)
- Princess Henriette Maria Norberta (Schloss Liechtenstein bei Mödling, 6 June 1843 – Frauenthal Castle, 24 December 1931), married in Vienna on 26 April 1865 her first cousin Prince Alfred of Liechtenstein (1842–1907), and had issue, which eventually inherited the Principality by male line
- Princess Anna Maria Franziska de Paula Leandra (Vienna, 26 February 1846 – Prague, 22 April 1924), married in Vienna on 22 May 1864 Georg Christian, Prince of Lobkowicz (Vienna, 14 March 1835 – Prague, 22 December 1908), 1,145th Knight of the Order of the Golden Fleece in Austria, and had issue
- Princess Therese Maria Josepha Martha (Schloss Liechtenstein, 28 July 1850 – Munich, 13 March 1938), married in Vienna on 12 April 1882 Prince Arnulf of Bavaria (Munich, 6 July 1852 – Venice, 12 November 1907), 1,035th Knight of the Order of the Golden Fleece in Austria, and had issue, now extinct
- Franz I, Prince of Liechtenstein (1853–1938)

Aloys II of Liechtenstein House of Liechtenstein Born: 26 May 1796 Died: 12 November 1858
Regnal titles
Preceded by Johann I Joseph	Prince of Liechtenstein; 1836–1858	Succeeded by Johann II
