= Charles, Prince of Löwenstein-Wertheim-Rosenberg =

Charles, Prince of Löwenstein-Wertheim-Rosenberg may refer to:

- Charles, Prince of Löwenstein-Wertheim-Rosenberg (1834–1921)
- Charles, Prince of Löwenstein-Wertheim-Rosenberg (1904–1990), grandson of the preceding
