= Charles, Prince of Löwenstein-Wertheim-Rosenberg (1904–1990) =

Karl
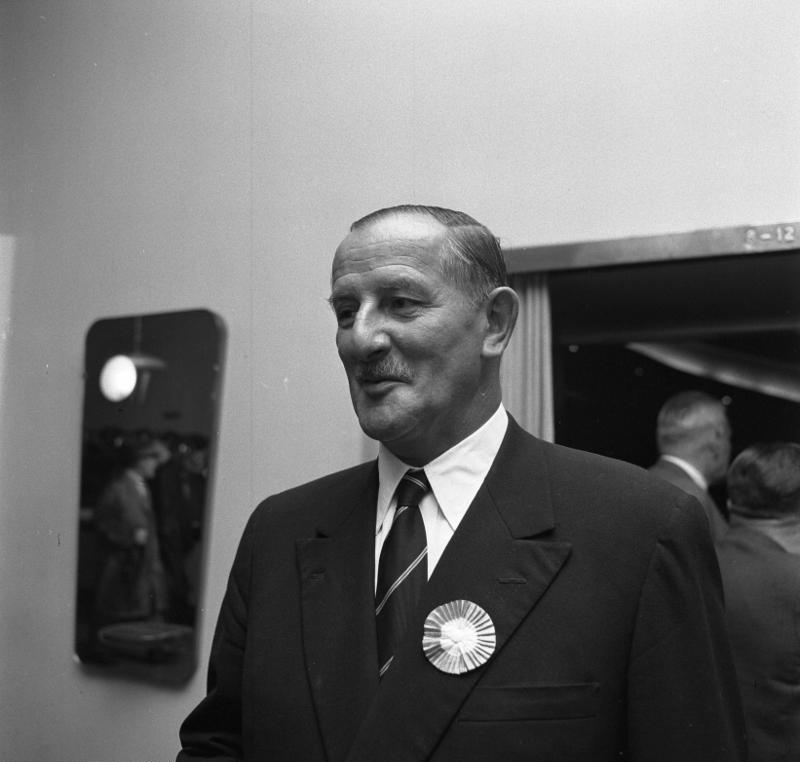
- Charles in 1962

Prince of Löwenstein-Wertheim-Rosenberg
- Period: 25 January 1952 - 23 August 1990
- Predecessor: Aloys
- Successor: Alois-Konstantin
- Born: 8 February 1904; Löwenstein Palace, Kleinheubach, Kingdom of Bavaria
- Died: 23 August 1990 (aged 86); Löwenstein Palace, Kleinheubach, West Germany
- Spouse: Carolina dei Conti Rignon (m. 1935; died 1975)
- Issue: Princess Maria, Archduchess Joseph Arpad of Austria; Princess Josephine Aloisa; Princess Monika Maria; Princess Christina; Alois-Konstantin, Prince of Löwenstein-Wertheim-Rosenberg; Princess Elizabeth-Alexandra; Princess Lioba Ernestine
- House: Löwenstein-Wertheim-Rosenberg
- Father: Aloysius, Prince of Löwenstein-Wertheim-Rosenberg
- Mother: Countess Josephine Kinsky of Wchinitz and Tettau
- Religion: Roman Catholic

Karl, Prince of Löwenstein-Wertheim-Rosenberg (German: Karl Friedrich Fürst zu Löwenstein-Wertheim-Rosenberg; 8 February 1904 in Kleinheubach – 23 August 1990 in Kleinheubach) was a German Roman Catholic nobleman. From 1948 to 1967 he was president of the Central Committee of German Catholics. Born as Prinz zu Löwenstein-Wertheim-Rosenberg, he inherited the title of 'Erbprinz' on his father's accession in 1921 and became Fürst zu Löwenstein-Wertheim-Rosenberg on his father's death in 1952.

== Life ==
The noble family Loewenstein-Wertheim goes back to the Wittelsbach Friedrich I., the Victorious, Elector of the Palatinate and his son Ludwig. Karl was the third of the nine children of Aloysius, Prince of Löwenstein-Wertheim-Rosenberg and Josephine Countess Kinsky of Wchinitz and Tettau. The House of Loewenstein-Wertheim is descended from Frederick I, Elector Palatine and his son Louis I, Count of Lowenstein. Karl studied at the Jesuit college of Stella Matutina in Feldkirch and later studied philosophy and jurisprudence in Innsbruck, Munich and Würzburg. He graduated with a 'Dr. jur.' from Julius-Maximilians-Universität Würzburg in 1928 with a doctoral thesis on Erbverzicht und Abfindungsvertrag. He served as speaker for Catholic Youth and from 1933 to 1938 chairman of the 'Verband der Wissenschaftlichen Katholischen Studentenvereine Unitas' (the Unitas Association of Catholic Scientific Student Societies), until it was disbanded in 1938 by the Nazi regime.

During the time of the Weimar Republic, Löwenstein joined various organizations that were active in the environment of the right-wing extremist Hugenberg Press. In particular, he appeared as a leading member of the Berlin National Club. At the Catholic Day in Nuremberg in 1931, he confessed his admiration for some aspects of the politics of the Fascist regime in Italy. In his opinion, the "shamelessness" in the German press, art, theater and film industry went far too far. The values of the Catholic Church were more important to Löwenstein than parliamentary democracy. Mussolini's Italy appeared to Löwenstein in 1931 as the better alternative, also with a view to an official leadership role of the aristocracy that was once again possible in a civil society. By contrast, Löwenstein criticized the extreme excesses of the Nazi ideology in 1931, especially its race theory. During the Nazi era, however, Löwenstein was a member of the SA and in 1934 asked the Unitas students to follow his example. In 1937 Karl zu Löwenstein denounced his liberal cousin Hubertus Prinz zu Löwenstein-Wertheim-Freudenberg, who denounced the Nazi persecution of Catholics on a trip through America. After 1945, Karl zu Löwenstein dismissed this as a necessary tribute to the time of National Socialism.

Karl Erbprinz zu Löwenstein was elected President of the Central Committee of German Catholics on September 6, 1948, one day after the end of the Catholic Day in Mainz. His father Aloysius and his grandfather of the same name Charles of Löwenstein also held this office. The latter was the founder of the ZdK in 1868. This allowed Karl zu Löwenstein to continue a long tradition. This met both the ideas of the church dignitaries and the Allies Occupying Powers. Despite the political statements made by Karl zu Löwenstein in the 1930s, he was able to benefit from the prestige of his name. As President of the Central Committee, he showed unconditional commitment to the Church and the Pope and gained respect in wide circles of post-war West German society during the Adenauer era. Before the Second Vatican Council Löwenstein promoted interdenominational dialogue. Together with the President of the Evangelical Church Day, Reinhold von Thadden-Trieglaff, he organized ecumenical encounters between Catholics and Protestants. Like his father, Löwenstein supported the German missionaries and promoted international cooperation between Christians worldwide.

When Löwenstein's behavior during National Socialism came into public discussion in 1967 after his appointment as a member of the World Lay Council, he resigned as President of the Central Committee in the same year. It was the journalist Leo Waltermann who broadcast the Nazi past of Löwenstein in a WDR program had called to memory and made serious accusations. Waltermann had obtained source material that was sent to him by Catholics abroad who did not want to accept a member of the lay council with a Nazi past. The three-generation tradition of the Löwenstein family at the head of the German Catholic Days ended. Karl's son Alois Konstantin builds on this family tradition by serving as a board member of the Forum Deutscher Katholiken since 2001 through the programs of the annual congresses organized by this organization in competition with the central committee "Joy in Faith", which are designed as a conservative alternative event to the Catholic Day.

== Marriage and issue ==
In Rome in 1935 Karl Erbprinz zu Löwenstein-Wertheim-Rosenberg married Carolina dei Conti Rignon, with whom he had seven children:

- Maria, Princess of Löwenstein-Wertheim-Rosenberg (1935–2018), married Archduke Joseph Árpád of Austria
- Josephine Aloisia, Princess of Löwenstein-Wertheim-Rosenberg (* 1937), married Prinz Alexander von und zu Liechtenstein (1929–2012), one of their children, Stefan von und zu Liechtenstein, was Liechtenstein's ambassador to Germany
- Monika Maria, Princess of Löwenstein-Wertheim-Rosenberg (* 1939), Don Jaime Mendez de Vigo y del Arco (b. 23 November 1933), descendant of Maria Christina of the Two Sicilies
- Christina, Princess of Löwenstein-Wertheim-Rosenberg (* 1940), married Archduke Michael of Austria, son of Archduke Joseph Francis of Austria
- Alois-Konstantin, Prince of Löwenstein-Wertheim-Rosenberg (* 1941), married Princess Anastasia of Prussia (b. 14 February 1944, Brieg)
- Elizabeth-Alexandra, Princess of Löwenstein-Wertheim-Rosenberg (* 1944), married José Maria Trénor y Suarez de Lezo, 9th Marquis of Serdañola (b. 25 July 1939)
- Lioba Ernestine, Princess of Löwenstein-Wertheim-Rosenberg (* 1946), married Prince Moritz Eugen zu Oettingen-Oettingen und Oettingen-Wallerstein (b. 20 May 1946)

== Ancestry ==
Ancestors of Charles, Prince of Löwenstein-Wertheim-Rosenberg (1904–1990)

8. Constantine, Hereditary Prince of Löwenstein-Wertheim-Rosenberg
4. Charles, 6th Prince of Löwenstein-Wertheim-Rosenberg
9. Princess Agnes of Hohenlohe-Langenburg
2. Aloysius, 7th Prince of Löwenstein-Wertheim-Rosenberg
10. Alois II, Prince of Liechtenstein
5. Princess Sophie of Liechtenstein
11. Countess Franziska Kinsky of Wchinitz and Tettau
1. Charles, 8th Prince of Löwenstein-Wertheim-Rosenberg
12. Count Joseph Kinsky of Wchinitz and Tettau
6. Count Friedrich Karl Kinsky of Wchinitz and Tettau
13. Countess Marie Czernin of Chudenitz
3. Countess Josephine Kinsky of Wchinitz and Tettau
14. Count Alfons Friedrich of Mensdorff-Pouilly
7. Countess Sophie Maria Manuela of Mensdorff-Pouilly
15. Countess Therese Rosa Franziska of Dietrichstein-Proskau-Leslie

== Bibliography ==
- Marie-Emmanuelle Reytier: Die Fürsten Löwenstein an der Spitze der deutschen Katholikentage: Aufstieg und Untergang einer Dynastie (1868 - 1968). In: Günther Schulz und Markus A. Denzel (Hrsg.): Deutscher Adel im 19. und 20. Jahrhundert. Büdinger Forschungen zur Sozialgeschichte 2002 und 2003. Reihe: Deutsche Führungsschichten in der Neuzeit, Band 26. Scripta Mercaturae Verlag, St. Katharinen 2004, ISBN 3-89590-145-8
- Nicolai Hannig: Die Affäre Waltermann. Formen der Skandalisierung im Kirchenfunk, in: Rundfunk und Geschichte 34 (2008), S. 5–17.

Charles, 8th Prince of Löwenstein-Wertheim-Rosenberg House of Löwenstein-Wertheim-Rosenberg Cadet branch of the House of Löwenstein-Wertheim Born: 8 February 1904 Died: 23 August 1990
Titles in pretence
Preceded by Aloys	— TITULAR — Prince of Löwenstein-Wertheim-Rosenberg; 25 January 1952 – 23 August 1990	Succeeded by Alois-Konstantin
