= Wilhelm von Gutmann =

Austrian entrepreneur (1826–1895)

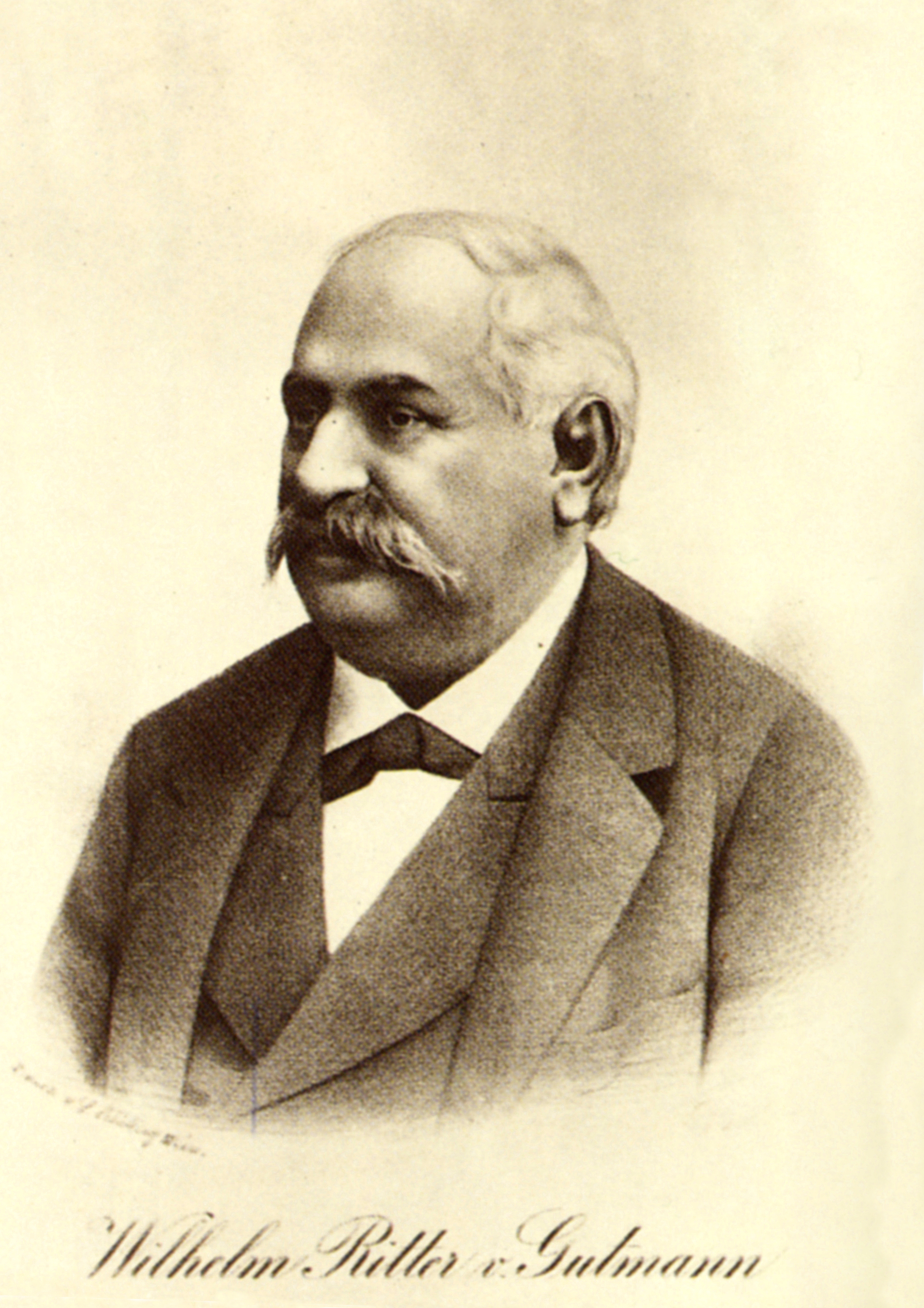
- Full name: Wilhelm Isak Ritter von Gutmann
- Born: 18 August 1826; Lipník, Moravia, Austrian Empire
- Died: 17 May 1895 (aged 68); Vienna, Austria-Hungary
- Noble family: Gutmann
- Spouses: Leonor Latzko (1856–1867) Ida Wodianer (1871–1895)
- Issue: Berthold von Gutmann; Max von Gutmann; Rosa von Gutmann; Marianne von Gutmann; Moritz von Gutmann; Rudolf von Gutmann; Princess Elsa of Liechtenstein
- Father: Marcus Leopold Gutmann
- Mother: Babette Dobrisch Frankl

Wilhelm Isak Wolf Ritter von Gutmann (18 August 1826 – 17 May 1895) was an Austrian entrepreneur. He founded and led the largest coal company in Austria-Hungary, Gebrüder Gutmann. He was ennobled in 1878 by Emperor Franz Joseph I, thus becoming part of the Austrian nobility. They were made knights of the Order of the Iron Crown which simultaneously meant being given a hereditary knighthood. He was the President of the Vienna Israelite Community from 1891 to 1892.

== Beginnings ==
Wilhelm Gutmann came from a distinguished family of Lipník Jews. His father traded in textiles. Wilhelm studied theology in Hungary, but he was not very interested, so he started working as an educator, and later as a senior administrative assistant at a farm brewery with his distant relative. Then he became independent and began trading grains, but he failed again. Everything improved for him until he began to deal with plaster. Later trading with coal, he made it rich.

== Family ==
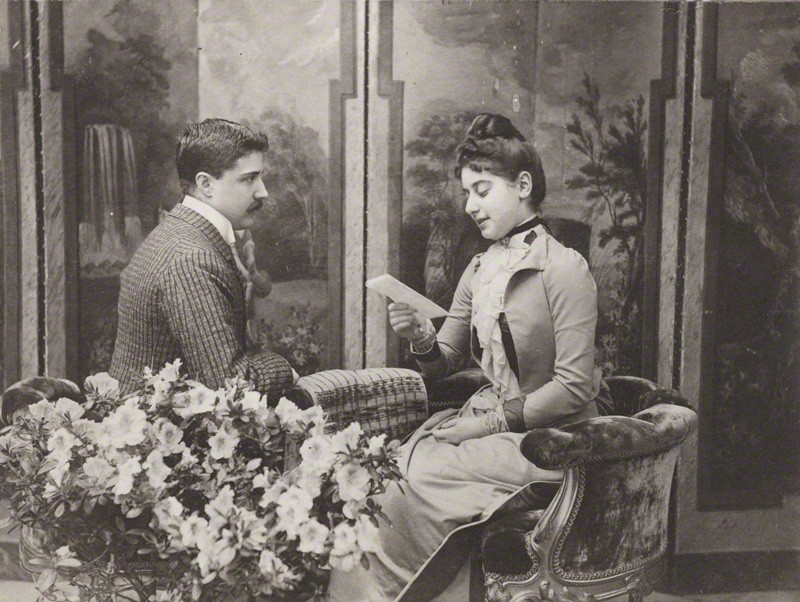
Sir Francis Abraham Montefiore and his wife, Lady Montefiore (née von Gutmann), 1890s

Wilhelm Gutmann married his first wife Leonor Latzko (1827–1867), with whom the children Berthold (1856–1932), Max von Gutmann (1857–1930), and Rosa (1862–1930) were born. After the early death of his first wife, he married Ida Wodianer (1847–1924), printer daughter, Philipp editor and landlords (Fülöp) Wodianer (1820–1899). With her he had four children: Marianne (1871–1956), Moritz (1872–1934), Elizabeth (1875–1947) and Rudolf (1880–1966).

His daughter Elisabeth married in 1929 to Franz I, Prince of Liechtenstein (1853–1938), becoming the princess consort of Liechtenstein. The older sister Marianne married the English Zionist Sir Francis Abraham Montefiore (1860–1935), becoming Lady Montefiore.
