= Heid =

Heid may refer to:

- Heid (name)
- Lake Heid, a lake in Grisons, Switzerland
- Heiðr, a seeress and witch in Norse mythology
