= Aloysius, Prince of Löwenstein-Wertheim-Rosenberg =

Aloysius
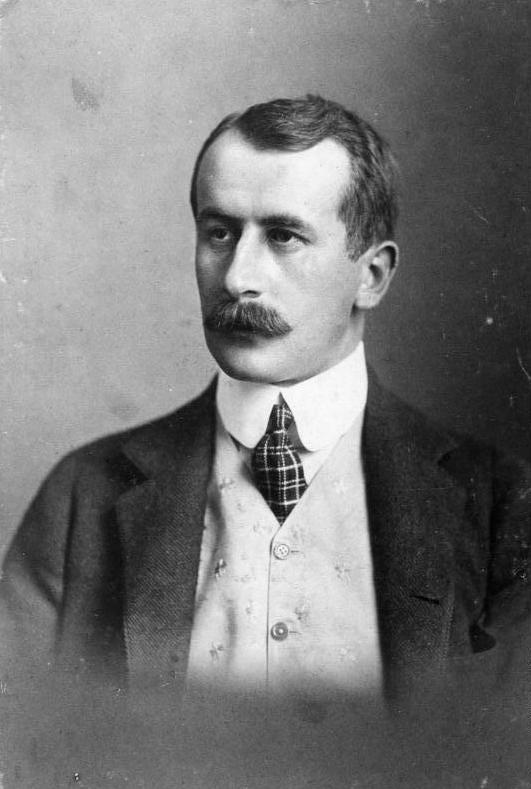
- Aloysius in 1912

Prince of Löwenstein-Wertheim-Rosenberg
- Period: 8 September 1908 – 25 January 1952
- Predecessor: Charles
- Successor: Charles
- Born: 15 September 1871; Kleinheubach, Kingdom of Bavaria
- Died: 25 January 1952 (aged 80); Bronnbach, West Germany
- Spouse: Countess Josephine Kinsky of Wchinitz and Tettau (m. 1898; died 1946)
- Issue: Princess Sophie; Princess Agnes; Karl, Prince of Löwenstein-Wertheim-Rosenberg; Princess Monika; Prince Felix; Prince Ferdinand; Princess Theresia; Princess Maria-Anna; Prince Johannes
Names
- German: Aloys Joseph Kamill Leopold Mikael Anton Maria
- House: Löwenstein-Wertheim-Rosenberg
- Father: Charles, Prince of Löwenstein-Wertheim-Rosenberg
- Mother: Princess Sophie of Liechtenstein
- Religion: Roman Catholic

Aloysius Joseph Kamill Leopold Michael Anton Maria, 7th Prince of Löwenstein-Wertheim-Rosenberg, German: Aloys Joseph Kamill Leopold Michael Anton Maria, Fürst zu Löwenstein-Wertheim-Rosenberg (15 September 1871 – 25 January 1952) was a German politician and the President of the Central Committee of German Catholics. He was a member of the House of Löwenstein-Wertheim-Rosenberg and was Prince of Löwenstein-Wertheim-Rosenberg from his father's abdication in 1908 until his death on 25 January 1952.

== Family ==
Born in Kleinheubach, Kingdom of Bavaria, Aloysius was the sixth child and second son of Charles, Prince of Löwenstein-Wertheim-Rosenberg (1834–1921), brother of titular Queen consort of Portugal Adelaide of Löwenstein-Wertheim-Rosenberg, and his wife Princess Sophie of Liechtenstein (1837-1899). Aloysius was a direct male-line descendant of Frederick I, Elector Palatine.

== Life ==
After completing his secondary education at the Jesuit College in Feldkirch, Aloysius graduated from law schools in Prague and in Fribourg, receiving his Dr. jur. utr. in 1895.

After the completion of his education and a trip to England, Aloysius began to assume greater responsibilities as a wealthy nobleman. He began serving as a member of the Württembergian Chamber of Lords (1895), the First Chamber of the Estates of the Grand Duchy of Hesse (1897), the Bavarian Reichsrat (1909), and the First Chamber of the Diet of the Grand Duchy of Baden (1910). In 1907, his father joined the Dominican Order and became a priest in 1908 after which he relinquished his noble titles and responsibilities to Aloysius.

In 1907, Aloysius was elected as a representative for the Trier I electoral district in the German Empire's Reichstag in which he served until the dissolution of the empire in 1918. He saw this and his other representative roles as a service to the state, which he rendered by defending the Roman Catholic Church and its goals. He did not, on the other hand, take to the work of a parliamentarian. While he could have chosen to embark on a diplomatic career, due to his previous education and the fact of belonging to the European nobility, he chose not to.

Although he volunteered for the war immediately in 1914, he tried to intervene as a moderating influence in the discussion on war aims; before 1914, he had already criticised German foreign policy as too power-hungry. From 1898, when he succeeded his father in embracing the Catholic lay movement and had served as vice-president of the Katholikentag in Neisse, he was a member of the central committee of German Katholikentage; in 1905 he chaired the Strasbourg Tag himself, thus helping to integrate the Catholics of Alsace-Lotharingia into the German Empire.

One of his primary interests was in missionary activities, and to bring life into this, the Internationales Institut für missionswissenschaftliche Forschungen in Münster (International Institute of missionary research) was founded in 1911 in Münster. Aloysius was its president until 1948. To this end, he also promoted the founding of journals.

Aloysius was from 1920 the president of the Central Committee of German Catholics. He firmly kept the politics of his time away from the Catholic lay movement. His views on lay ministry, coming from religious faith, corresponded to a patriarchal aristocratic world-view.

== Resistance to the Nazis ==
Adolf Hitler's rise to power in 1933 made the work of the central committee impossible. German participants were largely unable to attend the planned 1933 Allgemeiner Deutscher Katholikentag in Vienna, due to travel restrictions. For the 1934 Deutscher Katholikentag planned in Gleiwitz, Hermann Göring as Prussian prime minister requested an allegiance oath to the Third Reich; Aloysius of Löwenstein refused and canceled the Katholikentag. It was not until 1948 that another Katholikentag took place, which was to be the last one under Aloysius of Löwenstein's leadership. He handed over the presidency to his son, Charles Frederick.

== Marriage and issue ==
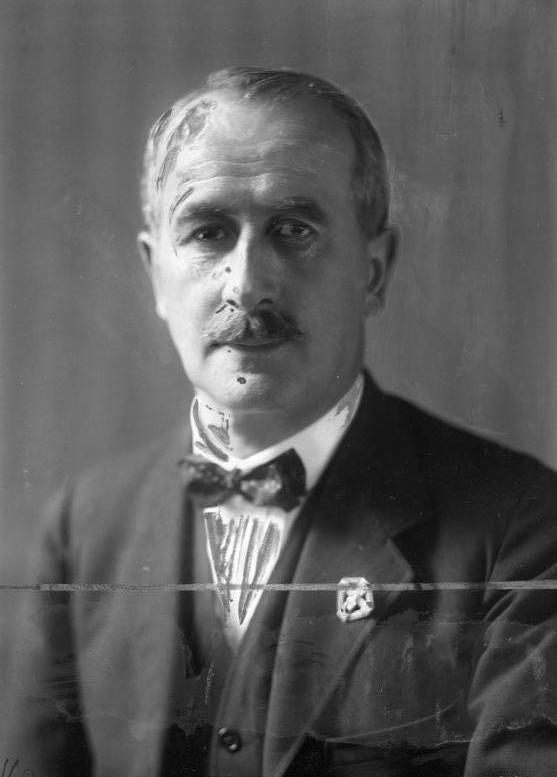
Aloysius in 1928

Aloysius married Countess Josephine Kinsky von Wchinitz und Tettau (1874-1946), daughter of Count Friedrich Karl Kinsky von Wchinitz und Tettau and Countess Sophie Maria Manuela von Mensdorff-Pouilly, on 27 September 1898 in Adlerkosteletz, Kingdom of Bohemia, Austria-Hungary. They had nine children:

- Princess Sophie of Löwenstein-Wertheim-Rosenberg (9 May 1900 – 16 February 1982), married Karl, Count von und zu Eltz gennant Faust von Stromberg.
- Princess Agnes of Löwenstein-Wertheim-Rosenberg (born 13 July 1902)
- Karl, Prince of Löwenstein-Wertheim-Rosenberg (8 February 1904 – 23 August 1990), married Carolina dei Conti Rignon.
- Princess Monika of Löwenstein-Wertheim-Rosenberg (25 February 1905 – 28 December 1992), married Erich August, Prince of Waldburg zu Zeil und Trauchburg.
- Prince Felix of Löwenstein-Wertheim-Rosenberg (6 April 1907 – 21 October 1986)
- Princess Theresia of Löwenstein-Wertheim-Rosenberg (27 December 1909 – 24 April 2000), married Carl Wolfgang, Count von Ballestrem.
- Prince Ferdinand of Löwenstein-Wertheim-Rosenberg (27 December 1909 – 8 February 1990)
- Princess Maria-Anna of Löwenstein-Wertheim-Rosenberg (25 February 1914 – 22 July 2000), married Ferdinand, Count von Magnis.
- Prince Johannes of Löwenstein-Wertheim-Rosenberg (8 July 1919 – 1 December 2000), married Baroness Christine von Loë.

His descendants include Karl-Theodor zu Guttenberg.

== Ancestry ==
Ancestors of Aloysius, Prince of Löwenstein-Wertheim-Rosenberg

8. Charles Thomas, 5th Prince of Löwenstein-Wertheim-Rosenberg
4. Constantine, Hereditary Prince of Löwenstein-Wertheim-Rosenberg
9. Countess Sophie of Windisch-Graetz
2. Charles, 6th Prince of Löwenstein-Wertheim-Rosenberg
10. Karl Ludwig, 3rd Prince of Hohenlohe-Langenburg
5. Princess Agnes of Hohenlohe-Langenburg
11. Countess Amalie Henriette of Solms-Baruth
1. Aloysius, 7th Prince of Löwenstein-Wertheim-Rosenberg
12. Johann I Joseph, Prince of Liechtenstein
6. Alois II, Prince of Liechtenstein
13. Landgravine Josepha of Fürstenberg-Weitra
3. Princess Sophie of Liechtenstein
14. Count Franz de Paula Kinsky of Wchinitz and Tettau
7. Countess Franziska Kinsky of Wchinitz and Tettau
15. Countess Theresia of Wrbna and Freudenthal

== Literature ==
- Theologische Realenzyklopädie. Bd 18. Katechumenat/Katechumen - Kirchenrecht, ISBN 3-11-011613-8
- Marie-Emmanuelle Reytier, "Die Fürsten Löwenstein an der Spitze der deutschen Katholikentage: Aufstieg und Untergang einer Dynastie (1868 - 1968)", in: Günther Schulz und Markus A. Denzel (eds.), Deutscher Adel im 19. und 20. Jahrhundert. Büdinger Forschungen zur Sozialgeschichte 2002 und 2003, ISBN 3-89590-145-8
- Karl Buchheim, Ultramontanismus und Demokratie, 1963.

Aloysius, 7th Prince of Löwenstein-Wertheim-Rosenberg House of Löwenstein-Wertheim-Rosenberg Cadet branch of the House of Löwenstein-Wertheim Born: 15 September 1871 Died: 25 January 1952
German nobility
Preceded by Charles	Prince of Löwenstein-Wertheim-Rosenberg; 8 September 1908 – 11 August 1919	Succeeded by German nobility titles abolished
Titles in pretence
Loss of title	— TITULAR — Prince of Löwenstein-Wertheim-Rosenberg; 11 August 1919 – 25 January 1952	Succeeded by Charles
