= Franziska, Princess of Liechtenstein =

Princess of Liechtenstein from 1836 to 1858

Franziska Kinsky
- Duchess of Troppau and Jägerndorf; Countess of Rietberg
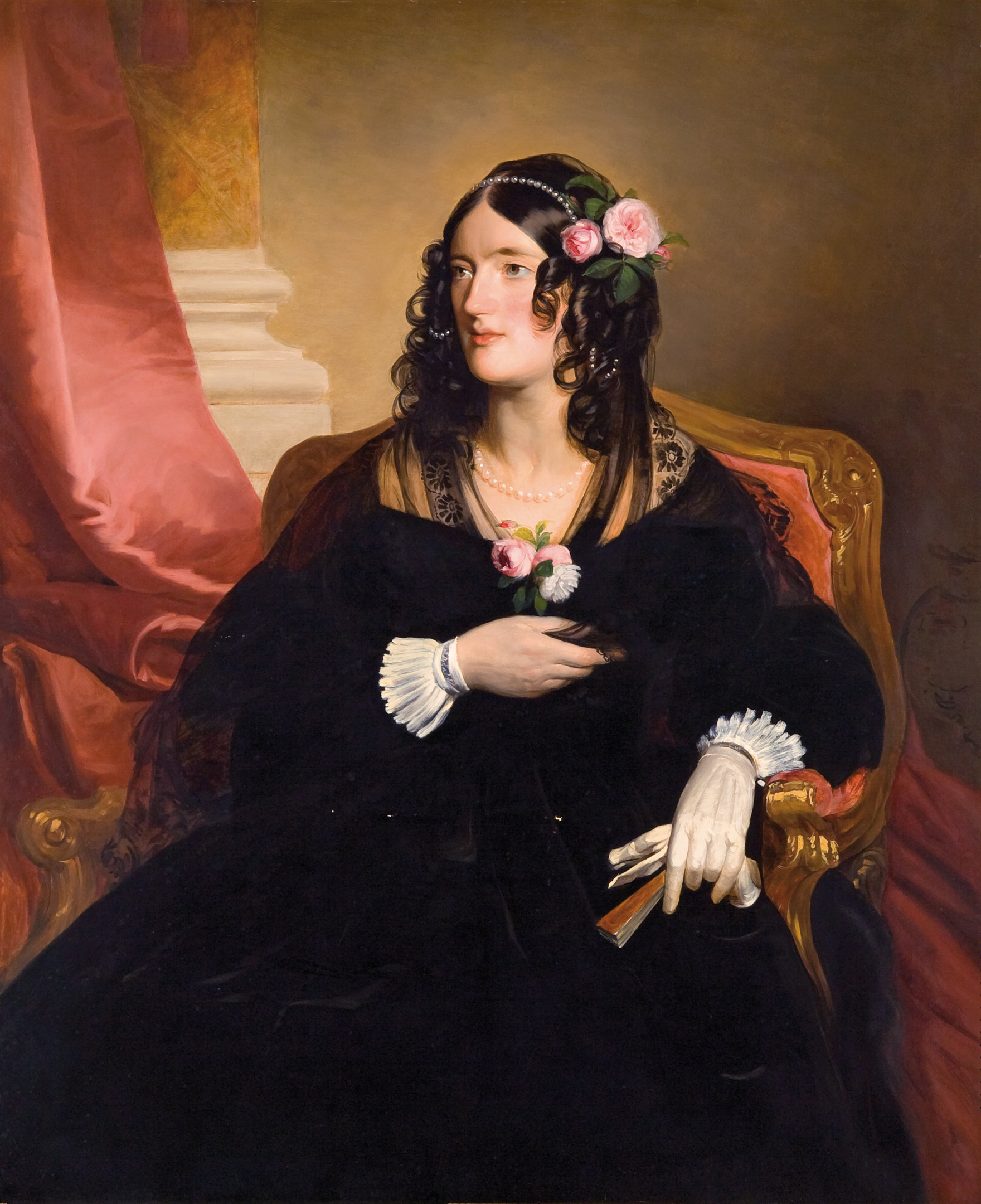
- Franziska Kinsky in 1831

Princess consort of Liechtenstein
- Tenure: 20 April 1836 – 12 November 1858

Regent of Liechtenstein
- Tenure: 10 February 1859 – November 1860
- Born: 8 August 1813; Vienna, Austrian Empire
- Died: 5 February 1881 (aged 67); Vienna, Austria-Hungary
- Burial: Church of the Nativity of the Virgin Mary, Brno
- Spouse: Aloys II, Prince of Liechtenstein (m. 1831; died 1858)
- Issue: Princess Marie, Countess Ferdinand of Trauttmansdorff-Weinsberg; Carolina, Princess of Schönburg-Hartenstein; Sophie, Princess of Löwenstein-Wertheim-Rosenberg; Princess Aloysia, Countess of Fünfkirchen; Ida, Princess of Schwarzenberg; Johann II, Prince of Liechtenstein; Princess Franziska; Princess Henriette; Anna, Princess of Lobkowicz; Theresa, Princess of Bavaria; Franz I, Prince of Liechtenstein
Names
- Franziska de Paula Barbara Romana Bernharda
- House: Kinsky
- Father: Count Franz de Paula Joseph Kinsky of Wchinitz and Tettau
- Mother: Countess Therese of Wrbna und Freudenthal

Countess Franziska de Paula Kinsky of Wchinitz and Tettau (8 August 1813, Vienna – 5 February 1881, Vienna) was princess consort of Liechtenstein from 1836 to 1858 as the wife of Aloys II, Prince of Liechtenstein, and her son's regent from 1858 to 1860.

== Biography ==
She was born as the younger daughter of Count Franz de Paula Joseph Kinsky von Wchinitz und Tettau (1784-1823) (younger brother of Ferdinand, Prince Kinsky) and his wife, Countess Therese Antonia Barbara von Würben und Freudenthal (1789-1874).

On 8 August 1831 she married Aloys II, Prince of Liechtenstein in Vienna. It was a double wedding as on the same day her elder sister Countess Maria Anna (1809-1892) married Prince Frederick Wilhelm of Solms-Braunfels (1801–1868), eldest surviving son of Prince Frederick William of Solms-Braunfels and Duchess Friederike of Mecklenburg-Strelitz.

Franziska acted as regent during the reign of her son, Johann II, from 10 February 1859 to November 1860. Her son ascended to the throne shortly after his 18th birthday, and as such his reign had been the longest precisely documented tenure of any European monarch since antiquity in which a regent (that is, a minor regency) was never employed, until the record was surpassed by that of Elizabeth II on 9 May 2022.

Franziska Kinsky did act as his regent, but she did not function as the regent of a minor regency government, but was appointed by her son as his regent in his absence, because he had not been given time to finish his education before suddenly inheriting the throne, and he wished to do so before actually taking up his rule, and thus appointed his mother to rule in his stead while he focused on finishing his studies. He officially appointed her 10 February 1859, and relieved her of her duties as regent when he finished his studies in November 1860.

Franziska Kinsky founded the first relief fund for orphans in Liechtenstein, as well as a school for girls, the Haus Gutenberg.

In 1854 she bought Gutenberg Castle, while in 1870 she also bought Burg Wartenstein and had it rebuilt in the fashionable Romantic style.

== Issue ==
Her children were:

- Princess Marie Franziska de Paula Theresia Josepha (Vienna, 20 September 1834 – Vienna, 1 December 1909), married in Vienna on 29 October 1860 Count Ferdinand of Trauttmansdorff-Weinsberg (Vienna, 27 June 1825 – Schloss Fridau, 12 December 1896), and had issue
- Princess Carolina Maria Josepha Walpurgis Nestoria (Vienna, 27 February 1836 – Vienna, 28 March 1885), married in Vienna on 3 June 1855 Alexander Fürst von Schönburg-Hartenstein (Vienna, 5 March 1826 – Vienna, 1 October 1896), and had issue
- Princess Sophie Marie Gabriele Pia (Vienna, 11 July 1837 – Schloss Fischhorn, 25 September 1899), married in Vienna on 4 May 1863 as his second wife Charles, 6th Prince of Löwenstein-Wertheim-Rosenberg (Haid, 21 May 1834 – Köln, 8 November 1921), 1,067th Knight of the Order of the Golden Fleece in Austria, and had issue
- Princess Aloysia Maria Gabriela Hyppolita (Eisgrub, 13 August 1838 – Vienna, 17 April 1920), married in Vienna on 22 May 1864 Heinrich Graf von Fünfkirchen (Schloss Fünfkirchen, 25 January 1830 – Vienna, 2 January 1885), without issue
- Princess Ida Maria Lamberta Theresia Franziska de Paula (Eisgrub, 17 September 1839 – Libejic, 4 August 1921), married in Vienna on 4 June 1857 Adolf Joseph 8th Fürst zu Schwarzenberg (Vienna, 18 March 1832 – Libejic, 5 October 1914), 1,092nd Knight of the Order of the Golden Fleece in Austria, and had issue
- Johann II, Prince of Liechtenstein (1840–1929)
- Princess Franziska Xaveria Maria David (Vienna, 30 December 1841 – Vienna, 13 May 1858)
- Princess Henriette Maria Norberta (Schloss Liechtenstein bei Mödling, 6 June 1843 – Frauenthal Castle, 24 December 1931), married in Vienna on 26 April 1865 her first cousin Prince Alfred of Liechtenstein (1842–1907), and had issue, which eventually inherited the Principality by male line
- Princess Anna Maria Franziska de Paula Leandra (Vienna, 26 February 1846 – Prague, 22 April 1924), married in Vienna on 22 May 1864 Georg Christian, Prince of Lobkowicz (Vienna, 14 March 1835 – Prague, 22 December 1908), 1,145th Knight of the Order of the Golden Fleece in Austria, and had issue
- Princess Therese Maria Josepha Martha (Schloss Liechtenstein, 28 July 1850 – Munich, 13 March 1938), married in Vienna on 12 April 1882 Prince Arnulf of Bavaria (Munich, 6 July 1852 – Venice, 12 November 1907), 1,035th Knight of the Order of the Golden Fleece in Austria, and had issue, now extinct
- Franz I, Prince of Liechtenstein (1853–1938)

== Ancestry ==
Ancestors of Franziska, Princess of Liechtenstein

8. Franz de Paula, 3rd Prince Kinsky of Wchinitz and Tettau
4. Joseph Ernst, 4th Prince Kinsky of Wchinitz and Tettau
9. Princess Maria Sidonie of Hohenzollern-Hechingen
2. Count Franz de Paula Kinsky of Wchinitz and Tettau
10. Ferdinand Bonaventura II, Count of Harrach-Rohrau and Thannhausen
5. Countess Rosa of Harrach of Rohrau and Thannhausen
11. Countess Maria Rosa of Harrach-Rohrau and Thannhausen
1. Countess Franziska Kinsky of Wchinitz and Tettau
12. Count Eugen of Wrbna and Freudenthal
6. Rudolf Johann, Count of Wrbna and Freudenthal
13. Countess Maria Theresia Kollonitz of Kollegrád
3. Countess Therese Antonia of Wrbna and Freudenthal
14. Dominik II, Prince of Kaunitz and Rietberg, Count of Questenberg
7. Countess Maria Theresia of Kaunitz-Rietberg-Questenberg
15. Countess Maria Bernhardine of Plettenberg-Wittem

== Notes ==
Franziska, Princess of Liechtenstein House of Kinsky Born: 8 August 1813 Died: 5 February 1881
Liechtensteiner royalty
Preceded by Josepha of Fürstenberg-Weitra	Princess consort of Liechtenstein; 1836–1858	Vacant Title next held by Elisabeth von Gutmann
