= Lenzerheide =

Village in Switzerland

Coordinates: 46°45′N 9°33′E

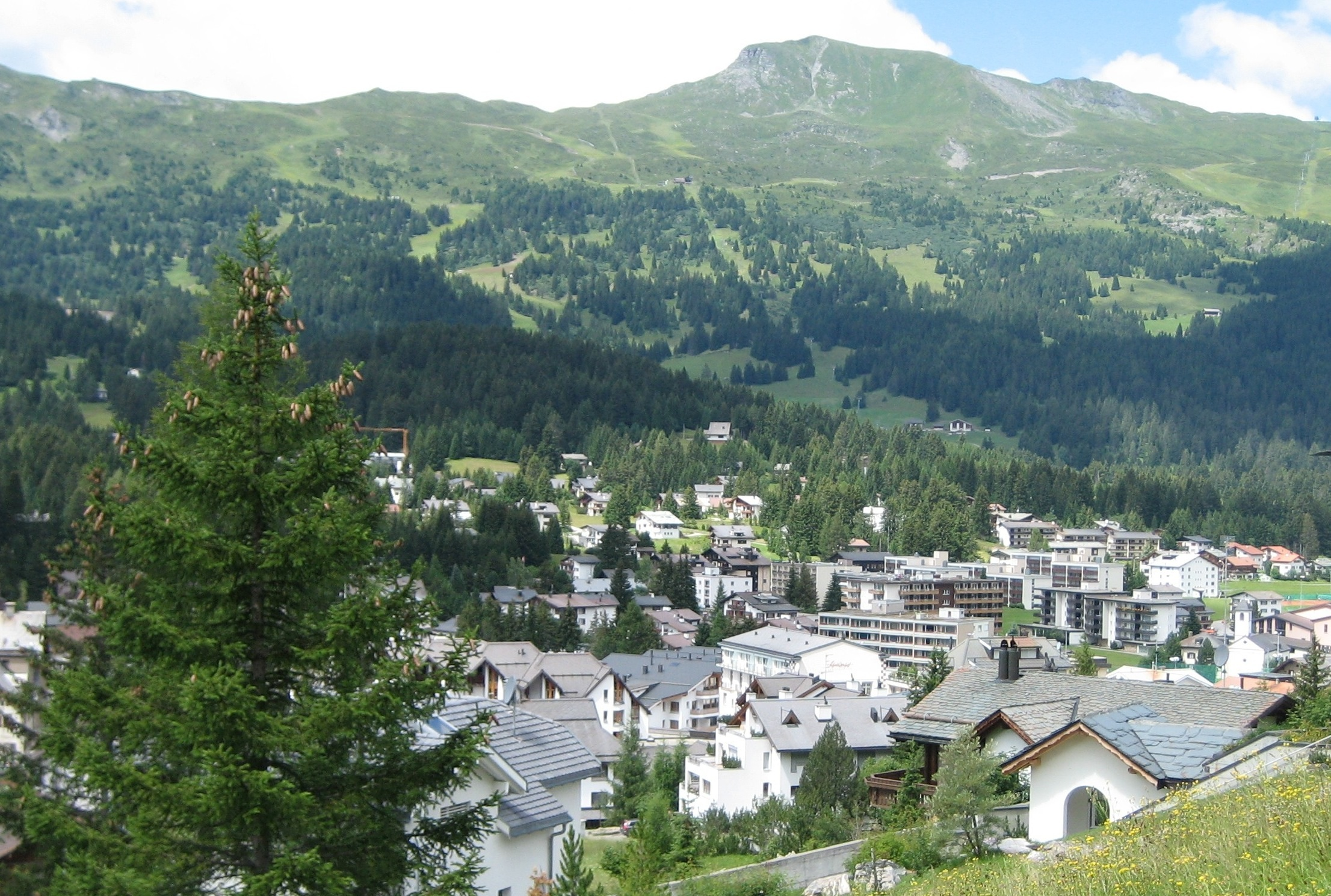
Lenzerheide

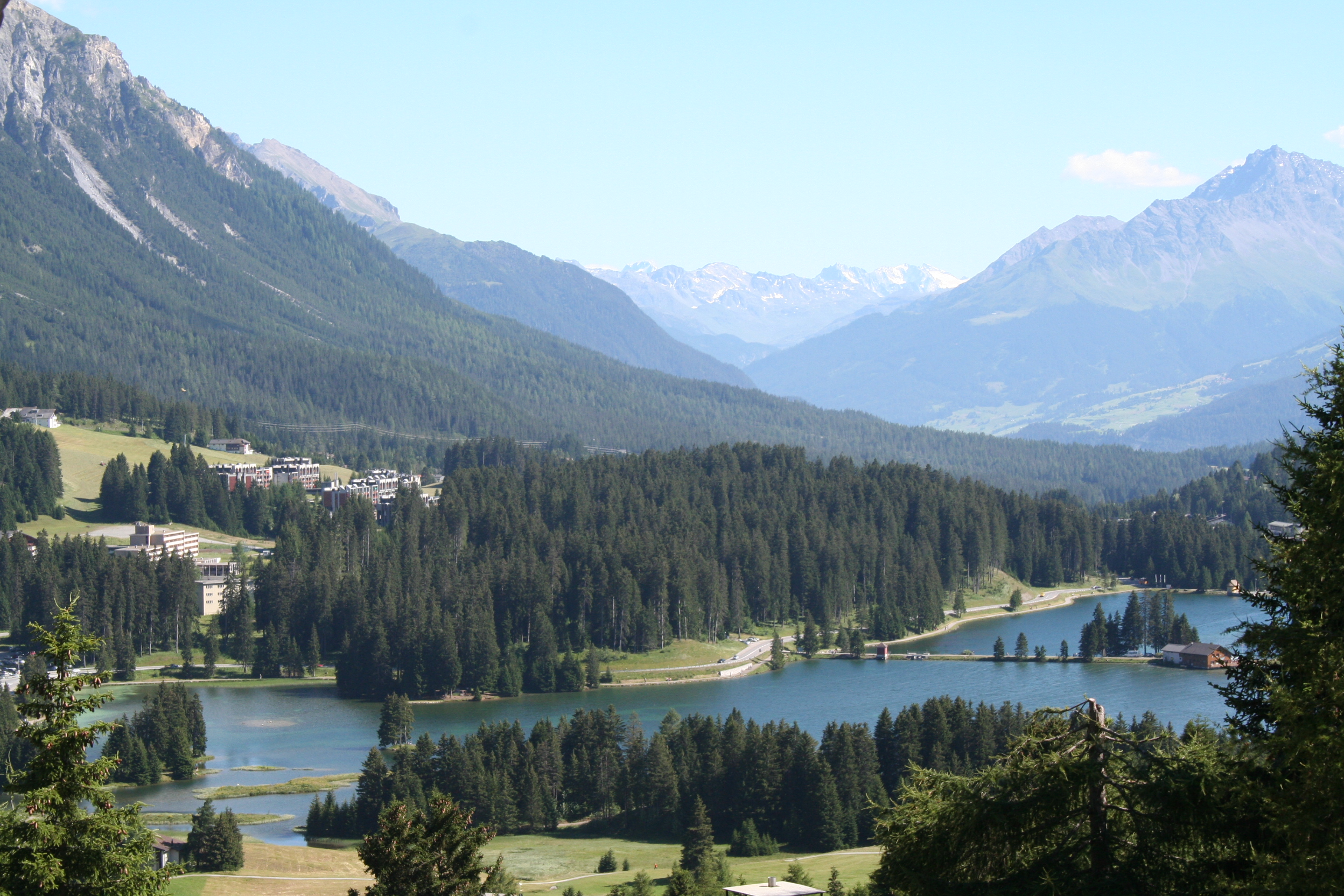
Valley of Lenzerheide

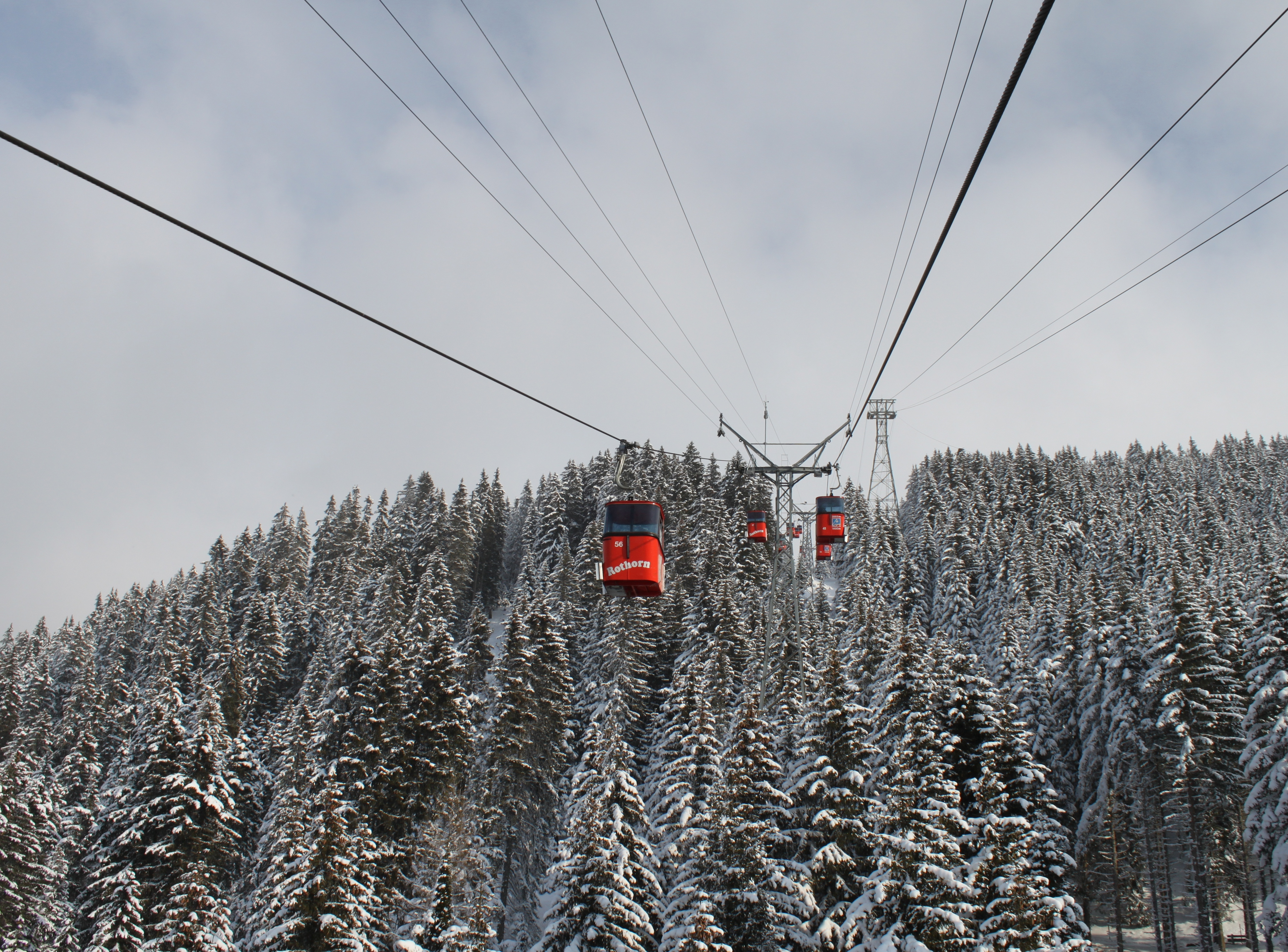
Gondola lift system

Aerial view (1947)

Lenzerheide (Romansh: Lai) is a mountain resort in the canton of Graubünden, Switzerland at the foot of the Parpaner Rothorn. The village lies in the municipality Vaz/Obervaz in the district of Albula, sub-district Alvaschein.

The village lies in a broad section of the valley between the cantonal capital Chur to the north and Tiefencastel, beyond which are the Julier Pass and St Moritz. The high valley forms a pass of no official name, often referred to as Lenzerheide pass, with a culmination point located 5 km north of the village.

Lenzerheide is popular as skiing resort and for its lake (Heidsee), which is frozen in winter. The Lenzerheide Bergbahnen offers access to the skiing areas of Stätzerhorn, Danis, Scalottas, and Rothorn. There are slopes approved for all FIS Alpine Ski World Cup races for women and men.

At the end of 2013 the Lenzerheide ski resort was linked with Arosa by cable-car, creating the new ski resort of Arosa Lenzerheide. Since then transport passes are available to both resorts.

A two-day hike connects Lenzerheide with two more resorts in Graubünden in different Valleys, which are Arosa (can be reached in one day) and Davos (a two-day hike).

== Historical note ==
On 31 July 1954, Antoinette, Crown Princess of Bavaria, wife of Rupprecht, Crown Prince of Bavaria, died in Lenzerheide.

Lenzerheide was also the location where philosopher Friedrich Nietzsche wrote his famous posthumous fragment about Nihilism.

== Sports ==
Lenzerheide has hosted several stages of the Tour de Ski, a cross-country skiing stage event. It was host to the 2018 UCI Mountain Bike World Championships, and was a stop in the 2019 UCI MTB World Cup tour. Lenzerheide hosted the 2025 Biathlon World Championships.
