= Montefiore baronets =

Set index for Montefiore baronets

Coat of Arms of Montefiore family

There have been two baronetcies created for members of the Montefiore family, both in the Baronetage of the United Kingdom. Both creations are extinct.

- Montefiore baronets of East Cliff Lodge (1846): see Sir Moses Montefiore, 1st Baronet (1784–1885)
- Montefiore baronets, of Worth Park (1886): see Sir Francis Abraham Montefiore, 1st Baronet (1860–1935)
