= Elsa, Princess of Liechtenstein =

Princess of Liechtenstein from 1929 to 1938

Elsa von Gutmann
- Duchess of Troppau and Jägerndorf; Countess of Rietberg
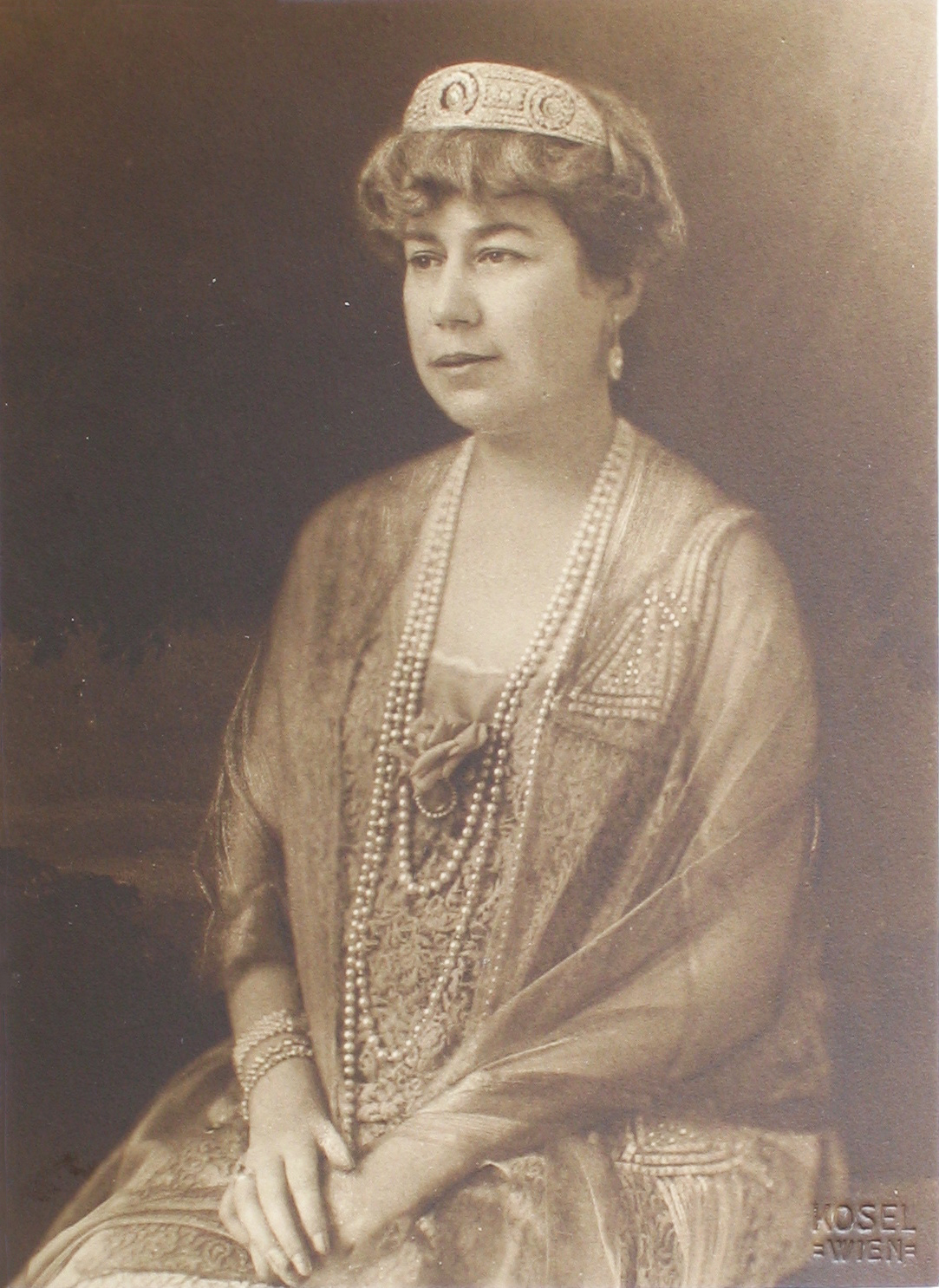
- Formal portrait, 1931

Princess consort of Liechtenstein
- Tenure: 22 July 1929 – 25 July 1938
- Born: Elisabeth Sarolta von Gutmann; 6 January 1875; Vienna, Austria
- Died: 28 September 1947 (aged 72); Vitznau, Switzerland
- Burial: St. Florian Cathedral, Vaduz, Liechtenstein
- Spouse: Baron Géza Erős de Bethlenfalva (m. 1899; died 1908) Franz I, Prince of Liechtenstein (m. 1929; died 1938)
- Father: Wilhelm von Gutmann
- Mother: Ida Wodianer
- Religion: Catholicism (previously Judaism)

Elisabeth Sarolta "Elsa" von Gutmann (6 January 1875 – 28 September 1947) was Princess of Liechtenstein from 1929 to 1938 as the wife of Prince Franz I of Liechtenstein.

== Early life ==
Elisabeth (also known as Elsa) was born in Vienna, Austria-Hungary. She was the daughter of Wilhelm Isak Wolf Ritter von Gutmann and his second wife, Ida Wodianer. Her father was a Jewish businessman from Moravia. His coal mining and trading company, Gebrüder Gutmann, was in a leading position in the market dominated by the Habsburg monarchy. He and his brother were ennobled in 1878 by Emperor Franz Joseph I, thus becoming part of the Austrian nobility. They were made knights of the Order of the Iron Crown which simultaneously meant being given a hereditary knighthood. Between 1891 and 1892 he was president of the Vienna Israelite Community. Elsa had three half-siblings from her father's first marriage and two brothers and a sister.

== Marriages ==
=== First marriage ===
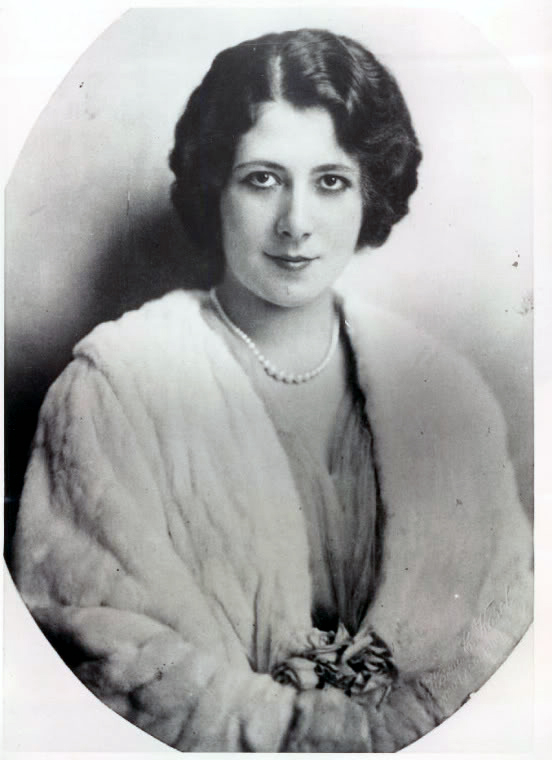
Elsa von Gutmann in 1910

In January 1899, she was baptised in the name Elisabeth Sarolta, and became a Catholic. A few days later, on 1 February 1899, Elisabeth was married in Vienna to the Hungarian Baron Géza Erős of Bethlenfalva, the elder son of Baron Alexander Erős of Bethlenfalva and his former wife, Franziska Chalupecký, by adoption Todesco, later wife of Prince Philipp Karl von und zu Liechtenstein, who was the first cousin of Elsa's second husband, Franz I, Fürst von und zu Liechtenstein. Baron Géza Erős of Bethlenfalva died on 7 August 1908, at the age of 42. Together, they had no children.

=== Second marriage and Princess of Liechtenstein ===
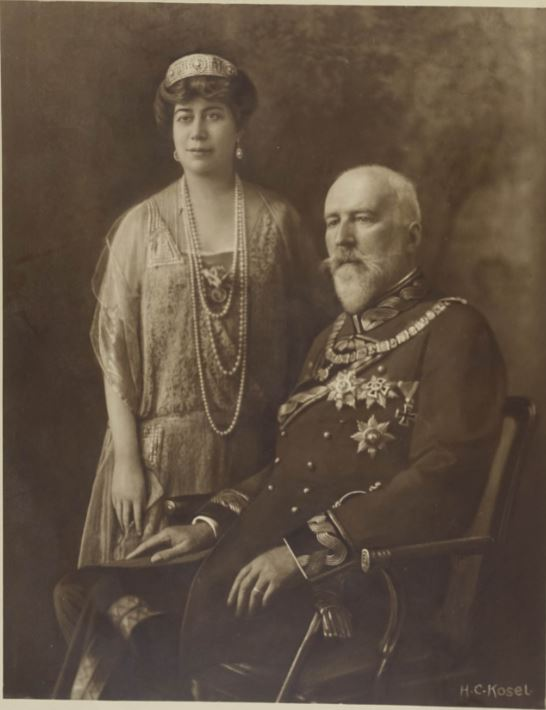
Elsa with her husband in 1935

In 1914, Elisabeth met the future Franz I, Prince of Liechtenstein at a relief fund for soldiers. Franz's brother Johann II, Prince of Liechtenstein did not approve of this relationship due to her Jewish background. On 11 February 1929, Prince Franz succeeded his brother as Franz I, as his brother had died unmarried and childless. On 22 July 1929, Elisabeth and Franz married at the small parish church of Lainz near Vienna. The marriage remained childless. The couple were the first prince and princess of Liechtenstein to make proper contact with the public through active representation, and Princess Elsa was the first Princess of Liechtenstein in 70 years at that point.

As Princess of Liechtenstein, she became active within the population of the country. Under her initiative she founded the medical Princess Elsa Foundation, and when there was a polio outbreak in Vaduz in 1931, she obtained medicine from the United States at her own expense. She, along with her husband, spent most of their time in the royal estates in Austria, yet visited the country annually, when they would visit sick people in hospitals and children in schools. As a result, she enjoyed relative popularity during her time as princess.

However, starting from 1933, due to Princess Elsa being of Jewish relation, she became a target of hostility from Nazi groups such as the Liechtenstein Homeland Service and later the German National Movement in Liechtenstein. Opponents also criticized her by falsely speculating that she wanted to succeed her husband to the throne upon his death.

On 31 March 1938, Franz I made his grand-nephew Franz Joseph his regent following the Anschluss of Austria. After making him regent they moved to Feldsberg (Valtice), Czechoslovakia and on 25 July, he died while at one of his family's castles, Castle Feldsberg, and Franz Joseph formally succeeded him as the Prince of Liechtenstein. Although Franz stated that he had given the regency to Franz Joseph due to his old age, it was speculated that he did not wish to remain in control of the principality if Nazi Germany were to invade, primarily because of Princess Elsa's Jewish relations.

== Later years ==
After the death of her husband in 1938, she left Austria and went into exile in Switzerland, where she died at Vitznau on Lake Lucerne in 1947.

She was initially buried in Dux Chapel in Schaan, before being moved to St. Florian Cathedral in Vaduz in 1960.

Liechtensteiner royalty
Vacant Title last held by Franziska Kinsky of Wchinitz and Tettau	Princess consort of Liechtenstein; 1929–1938	Vacant Title next held by Georgina von Wilczek
