= Heid (name) =

Heid is both a surname and a given name. Notable people with the name include:

- Bill Heid (born 1948), American jazz musician
- Chris Heid (born 1983), Canadian-German ice hockey player
- Jack Heid (1924–1987), American cyclist
- Heid E. Erdrich (born 1963), Native American writer
- Rik Heid, American para-alpine skier
