= Haid =

Haid may refer to:

== People ==
- Charles Haid (born 1943), an American actor and director
- Grit Haid (1900–1938), an Austrian stage and film actress, the sister of Liane Haid
- Herenaus Haid (1784–1873), a German Catholic clergyman, teacher, catechist and author
- Johann Elias Haid (1739–1809), a German engraver and portraitiste, the son of Johann Jacob Haid
- Johann Jacob Haid (1704–1767), a German engraver from Augsbourg, the father of Johann Elias Haid
- Kadra Mahamoud Haid, wife of Ismaïl Omar Guelleh, President of Djibouti
- Leo Haid (1849–1924), an American Benedictine abbot and Catholic bishop
- Liane Haid (1895–2000), an Austrian actress, first Austrian movie star, the sister of Grit Haid

== Places ==
- Fays, a hamlet located in Ciney

== See also ==
- Heid (disambiguation)
- Head
