= Francis Abraham Montefiore =

Sir Francis Abraham Montefiore, 1st Baronet (1860–1935) was an English communal Sephardic leader and Zionist.

== Life ==
He was born on 10 October 1860, the son of Joseph Mayer Montefiore of Worth Park and his wife Henrietta Francisca Sichel; his father was President of the Board of Deputies of British Jews, he was born . He attended Wellington College in 1875/6 and matriculated at Christ Church, Oxford in 1879.

Coat of arms of the Montefiore baronets of Worth Park; the three banners have inscribed "Jerusalem" in Hebrew

In 1886 Montefiore took up the revived baronetcy, of East Cliff Lodge (1846), previously held by Sir Moses Montefiore who had died in 1885.

Montefiore became High Sheriff of Kent in 1894, and of Sussex in 1895. He supported Theodor Herzl and Ḥibbat Zion. He was chairman of the executive committee of the English Zionist Federation and represented the English section at Zionist congresses. He was also elected chairman of Elders of the Spanish and Portuguese congregations.

== Death ==
Sir Francis Abraham Montefiore died 1 July 1935, when the baronetcy became extinct.

== Family ==
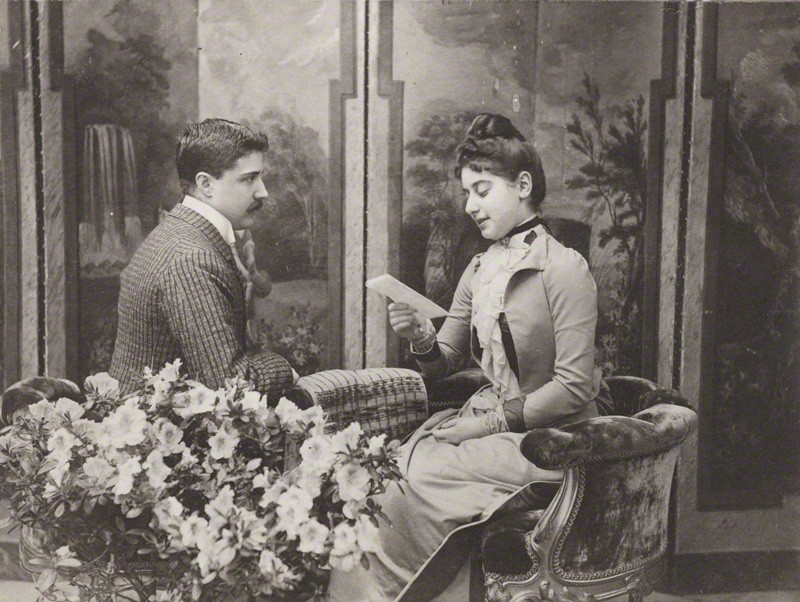
Sir Francis Abraham Montefiore and his wife Lady Montefiore, 1890s photograph

Montefiore married in 1888 Marianne von Gutmann, daughter of Wilhelm von Gutmann. He left no heir.

== Notes ==
Attribution

Baronetage of the United Kingdom
Preceded by Walker baronets	Montefiore baronets of Worth Park; 16 February 1886	Succeeded by Stephen baronets
