= Princess Sophie of Liechtenstein =

Princess Sophie
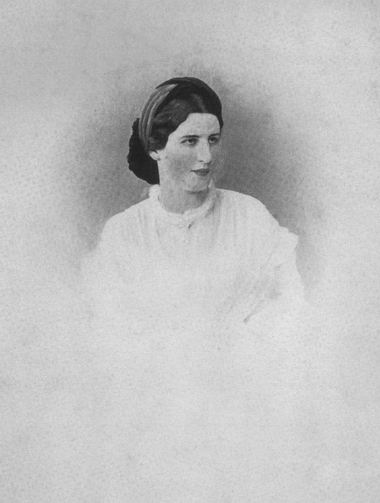

Princess consort of Löwenstein-Wertheim-Rosenberg
- Tenure: 4 May 1863 – 25 September 1899
- Born: 11 July 1837; Vienna, Austrian Empire
- Died: 25 September 1899 (aged 62); Schloss Fischhorn, Zell am See, Salzburg, Austria-Hungary
- Spouse: Charles, Prince of Löwenstein (m. 1863)
- Issue: Princess Franziska; Adelheid, Countess Adalbert Joseph of Schönborn; Princess Agnes; Joseph, Hereditary Prince of Löwenstein; Maria Theresa, Duchess of Braganza; Aloys, Prince of Löwenstein; Anna, Princess Felix of Schwarzenberg; Prince Johannes Baptista
Names
- German: Sophie Marie Gabriele Pia
- House: Liechtenstein
- Father: Alois II, Prince of Liechtenstein
- Mother: Countess Franziska Kinsky of Wchinitz and Tettau

Princess Sophie Marie Gabriele Pia of Liechtenstein (German: Sophie Marie Gabriele Pia, Prinzessin von und zu Liechtenstein) (11 July 1837, Vienna, Austrian Empire – 25 September 1899, Schloss Fischhorn, Zell am See, Salzburg, Austria-Hungary) was a Princess of Liechtenstein and member of the Princely House of Liechtenstein by birth. Through her marriage to Charles, Prince of Löwenstein, Sophie was Princess of Löwenstein-Wertheim-Rosenberg from 4 May 1863 until 25 September 1899 and a member of the House of Löwenstein-Wertheim-Rosenberg.

== Family ==
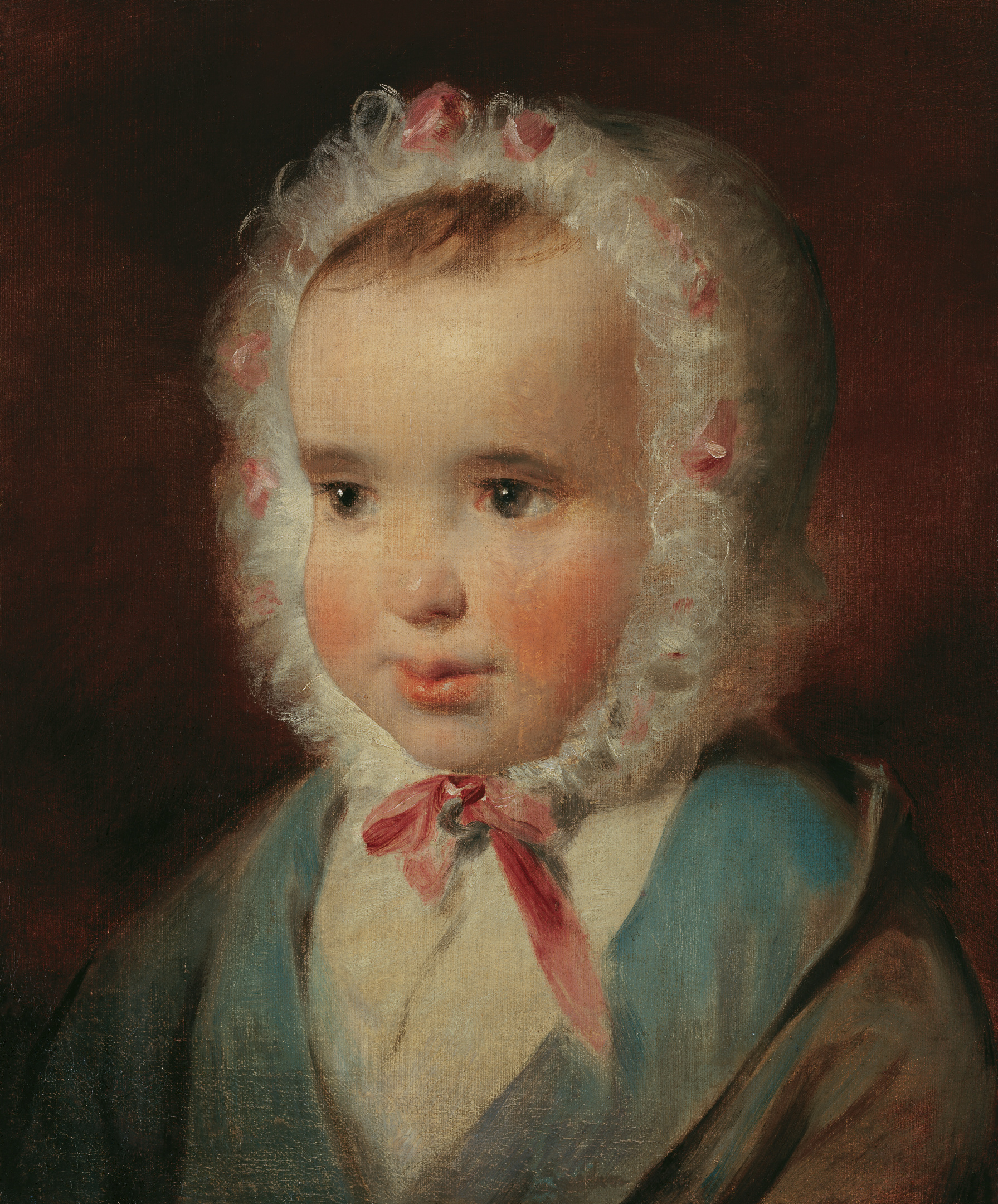
Portrait of Princess Sophie in 1838, age one year. Painted by Friedrich von Amerling.

Sophie was the third eldest child and daughter of Alois II, Prince of Liechtenstein and his wife Countess Franziska Kinsky of Wchinitz and Tettau. She was an elder sister of Johann II, Prince of Liechtenstein and Franz I, Prince of Liechtenstein.

== Marriage and issue ==
Sophie married Charles, Prince of Löwenstein, only son and second and youngest child of Constantine, Hereditary Prince of Löwenstein and Princess Agnes of Hohenlohe-Langenburg, on 4 May 1863 in Vienna. They had eight children:

- Princess Franziska of Löwenstein(-Wertheim-Rosenberg) (Kleinheubach 30 March 1864 – Düsseldorf 12 April 1930)
- Princess Adelheid of Löwenstein(-Wertheim-Rosenberg) (Kleinheubach 17 July 1865 – Prague 6 September 1941), married Count Adalbert Joseph of Schönborn.
- Princess Agnes of Löwenstein(-Wertheim-Rosenberg) (Kleinheubach 22 December 1866 – Oosterhout 23 January 1954)
- Joseph, Hereditary Prince of Löwenstein(-Wertheim-Rosenberg) (Kleinheubach 11 April 1868 – Rome 15 February 1870)
- Princess Maria Theresa of Löwenstein(-Wertheim-Rosenberg) (Rome 4 January 1870 – Vienna 17 January 1935), married Miguel Januário, Duke of Braganza.
- Aloys, Prince of Löwenstein(-Wertheim-Rosenberg) (Kleinheubach 15 September 1871 – Schloss Bronnbach 25 January 1952), married Countess Josephine Kinsky of Wchinitz and Tettau.
- Princess Anna of Löwenstein(-Wertheim-Rosenberg) (Kleinheubach 28 September 1873 – Vienna 27 June 1936), married Prince Felix of Schwarzenberg.
- Prince Johannes Baptista of Löwenstein(-Wertheim-Rosenberg) (Kleinheubach 29 August 1880 – Newport 18 May 1956), married Countess Alexandra of Bernstorff.

== Ancestry ==
Ancestors of Princess Sophie of Liechtenstein

8. Franz Josef I, Prince of Liechtenstein
4. Johann I Josef, Prince of Liechtenstein
9. Countess Leopoldine of Sternberg
2. Alois II, Prince of Liechtenstein
10. Joachim Egon, Landgrave of Fürstenberg-Weitra
5. Landgravine Josepha of Furstenberg-Weitra
11. Countess Sophia Maria of Oettingen-Wallerstein
1. Princess Sophie of Liechtenstein
12. Joseph, 4th Prince Kinsky of Wchinitz and Tettau
6. Count Franz Kinsky of Wchinitz and Tettau
13. Countess Rosa of Harrach-Rohrau and Thannhausen
3. Countess Franziska Kinsky of Wchinitz and Tettau
14. Count Rudolf of Wrbna and Freudenthal
7. Countess Therese of Wrbna and Freudenthal
15. Countess Maria Theresia of Kaunitz-Rietberg

Princess Sophie of Liechtenstein House of Liechtenstein Born: 11 July 1837 Died: 25 September 1899
German nobility
Preceded by Countess Sophie of Windisch-Graetz	Princess consort of Löwenstein-Wertheim-Rosenberg; 4 May 1863 – 25 September 1899	Succeeded by Countess Josephine Kinsky of Wchinitz and Tettau
