= Princess Aloysia of Liechtenstein =

Liechtensteiner princess

Princess Aloysia
- Countess Heinrich Fünfkirchen
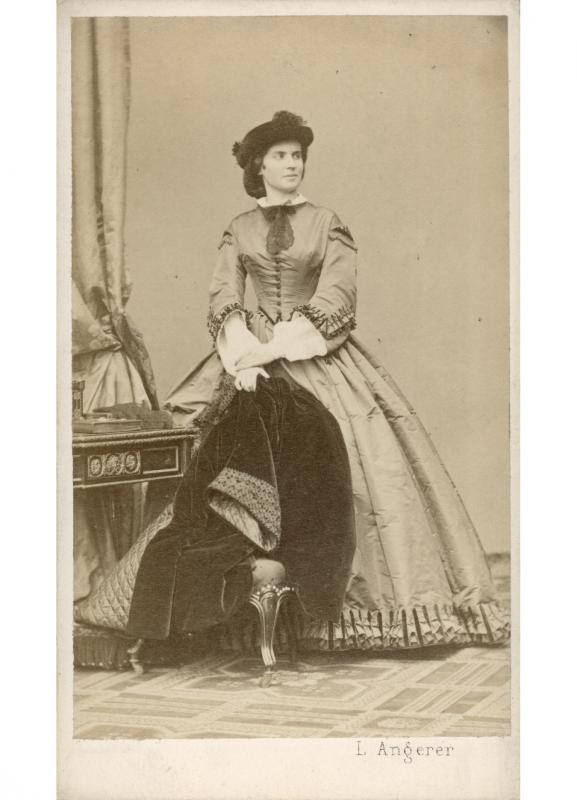
- Born: 13 August 1838; Lednice, Moravia, Austrian Empire
- Died: 17 April 1920 (aged 81); Vienna, Austria
- Burial: Stützenhofen, Drasenhofen
- Spouse: Count Heinrich Fünfkirchen (m. 1864; died 1885)
Names
- Aloysia Maria Gabriela Hyppolita
- House: Liechtenstein
- Father: Aloys II, Prince of Liechtenstein
- Mother: Countess Franziska Kinsky of Wchinitz and Tettau

Princess Aloysia of Liechtenstein (Aloysia Maria Gabriela Hyppolita; 13 August 1838 – 17 April 1920) was a member of the Princely Family of Liechtenstein as the daughter of Aloys II. She was active in Catholic charities and founded a mission for the homeless in Vienna.

== Biography ==
Princess Aloysia was born on 13 August 1838 at Lednice Castle in Lednice to Aloys II, Prince of Liechtenstein and Countess Franziska Kinsky of Wchinitz and Tettau.

On 22 May 1864, she married the Austrian nobleman Count Heinrich Fünfkirchen, the son of Count Otto Franz Fünfkirchen and Countess Aloysia von Wurmbrand-Stuppach, in Vienna. Their marriage remained childless.

She was an active philanthropist and, in 1904, founded the Viennese Station Mission to care for the homeless and the needy in Vienna. A Catholic, she was active in the Catholic Imperial Women's Organization of Austria.

Aloysia was widowed on 2 January 1885. She died on 17 April 1920 in Vienna. She is buried next to her husband in the Fünfkirchen family crypt in Stützenhofen, Drasenhofen.
