= Heidsee =

- Igl Lai
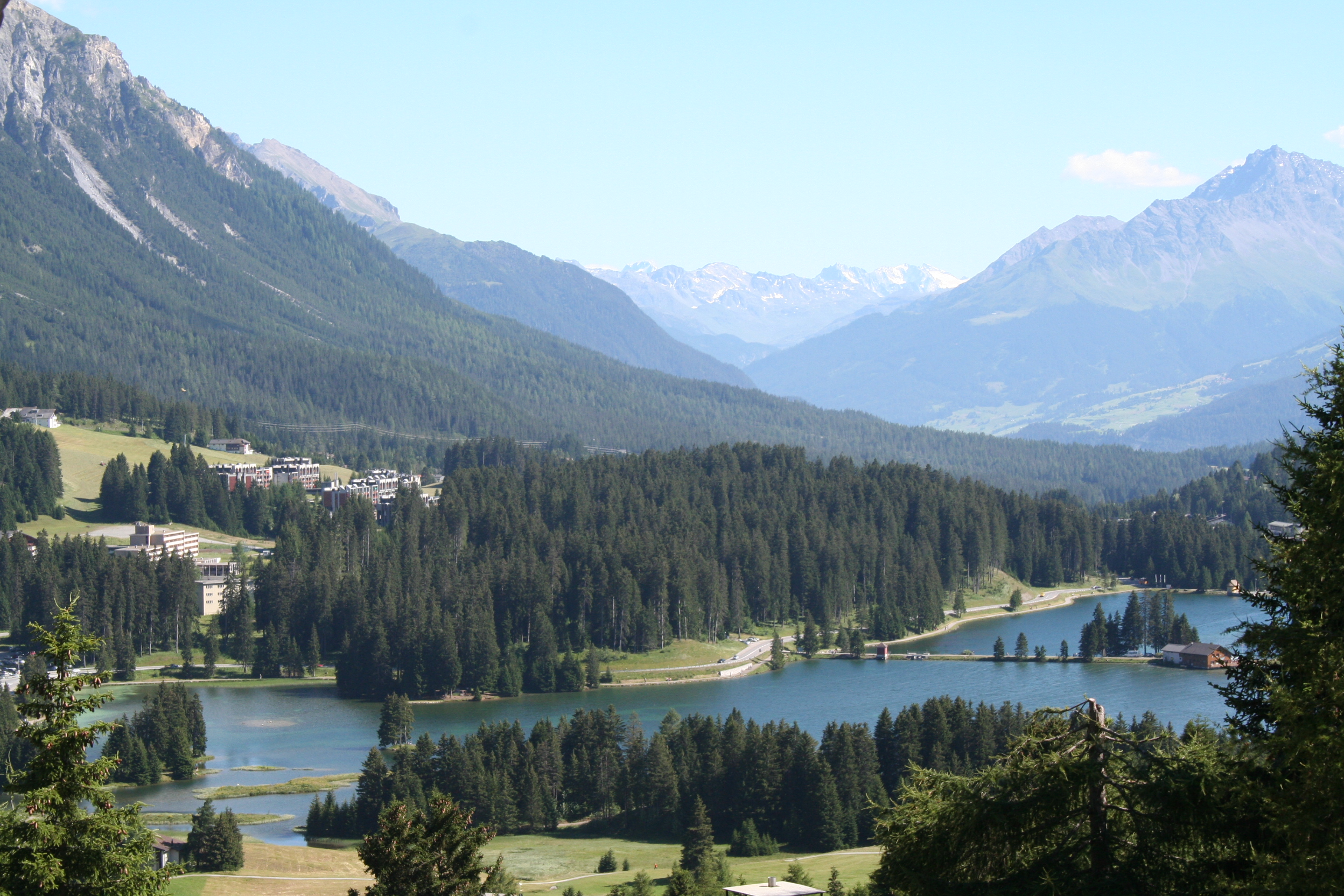

- Location within Canton of Graubünden Location within Switzerland Location within Italy Location within Alps
- Interactive map of Heidsee
- Location: Lenzerheide, Grisons
- Coordinates: 46°44′23″N 9°33′02″E
- Lake type: natural, reservoir
- Basin countries: Switzerland
- Surface area: 0.33 km^{2} (0.13 sq mi) or 0.41 km^{2} (0.16 sq mi) with lower basin
- Surface elevation: 1,484 m (4,869 ft)
- Frozen: Winter (accessible December–March)
- Islands: (Heidseeinseln)

Heidsee (Romansh: Igl Lai) is a lake at Lenzerheide, Grisons, Switzerland. Its surface area is 0.41 km^{2} (0.16 sq mi).

It lies at the foot of the Parpaner Rothorn.

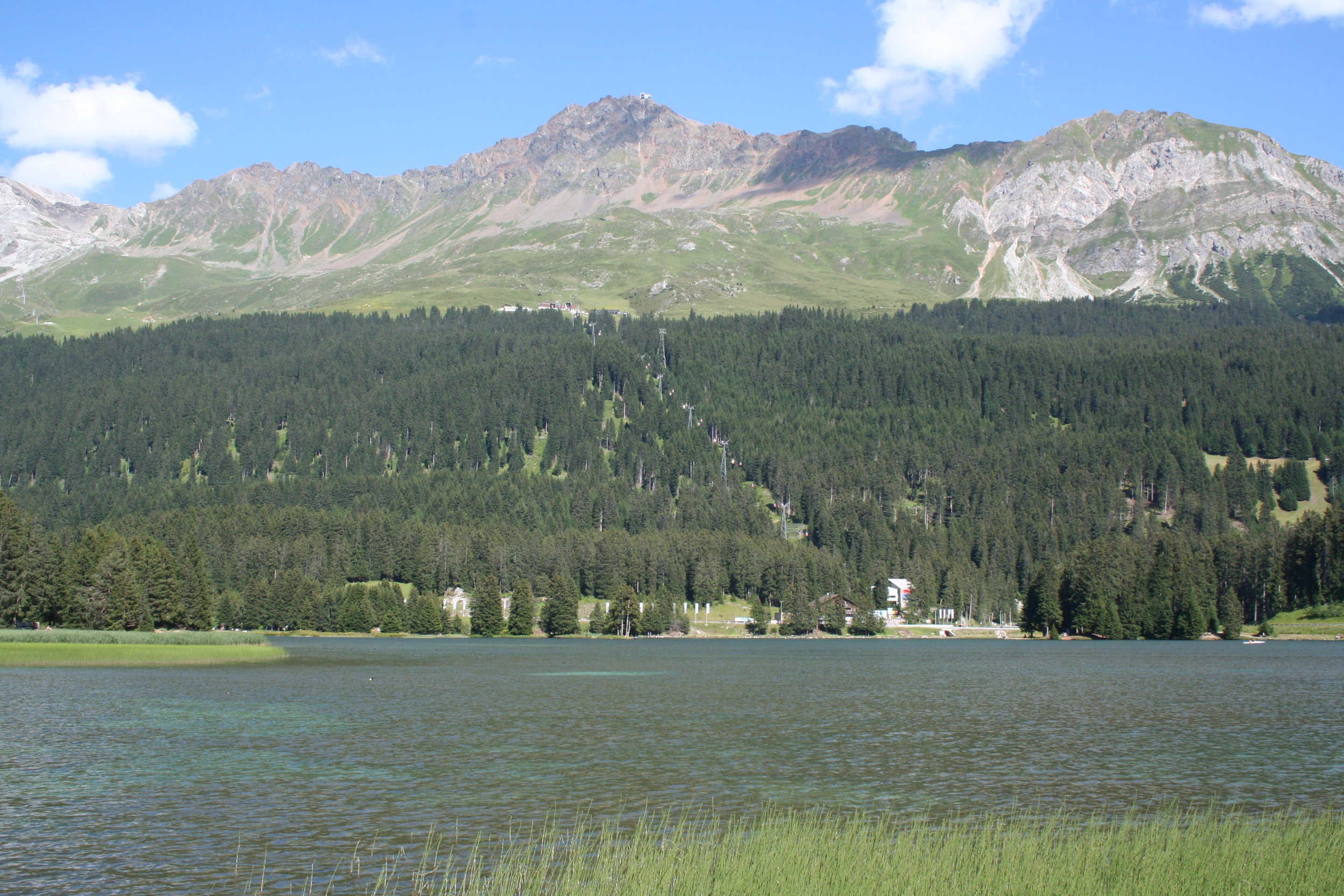
Heidsee at the foot of the Rothorn

== See also ==
- List of mountain lakes of Switzerland
