= Libějice =

- Municipality
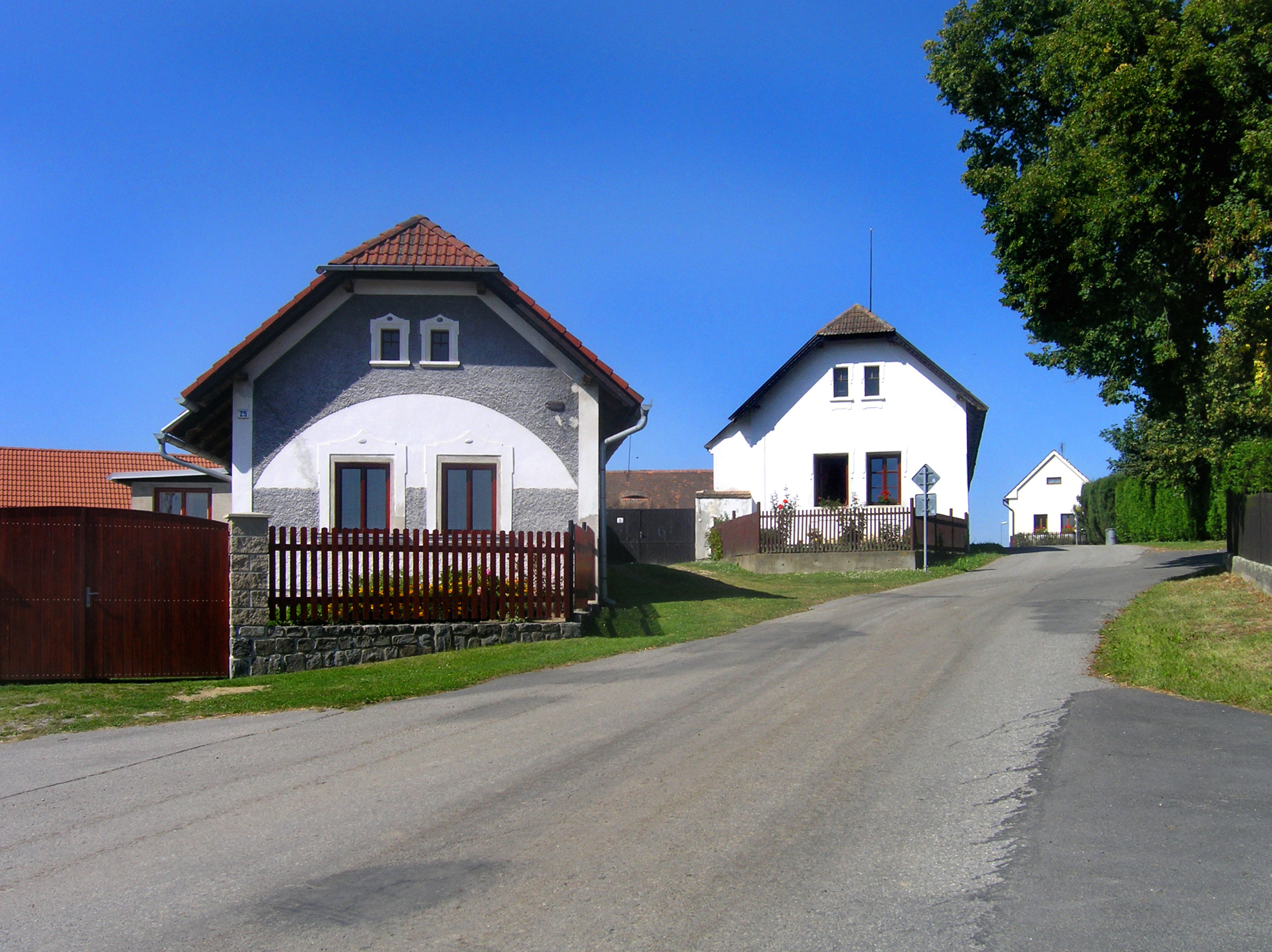
- Centre of Libějice

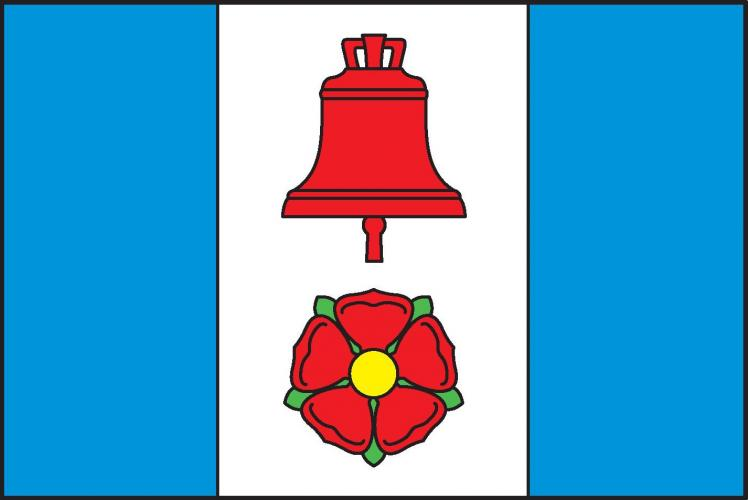
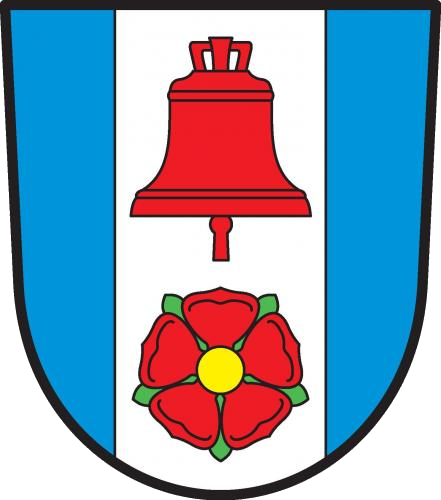
- Flag Coat of arms

- Location in the Czech Republic
- Coordinates: 49°22′37″N 14°37′26″E
- Country: Czech Republic
- Region: South Bohemian
- District: Tábor
- First mentioned: 1379

Area
  - Total: 2.95 km^{2} (1.14 sq mi)
- Elevation: 490 m (1,610 ft)

Population (2026-01-01)
  - Total: 123
  - Density: 41.7/km^{2} (108/sq mi)
- Time zone: UTC+1 (CET)
  - Summer (DST): UTC+2 (CEST)
- Postal code: 390 02
- Website: www.libejice.cz

Libějice is a municipality and village in Tábor District in the South Bohemian Region of the Czech Republic. It has about 100 inhabitants.

Libějice lies approximately 6 kilometres (4 mi) south-west of Tábor, 46 km (29 mi) north of České Budějovice, and 81 km (50 mi) south of Prague.

== Demographics ==
Historical population
Year	Pop.	±%
1869	164	—
1880	171	+4.3%
1890	173	+1.2%
1900	183	+5.8%
1910	154	−15.8%
1921	149	−3.2%
1930	160	+7.4%
1950	127	−20.6%
1961	126	−0.8%
1970	120	−4.8%
1980	110	−8.3%
1991	104	−5.5%
2001	109	+4.8%
2011	108	−0.9%
2021	118	+9.3%
Source: Censuses
