= Lednice =

- Municipality
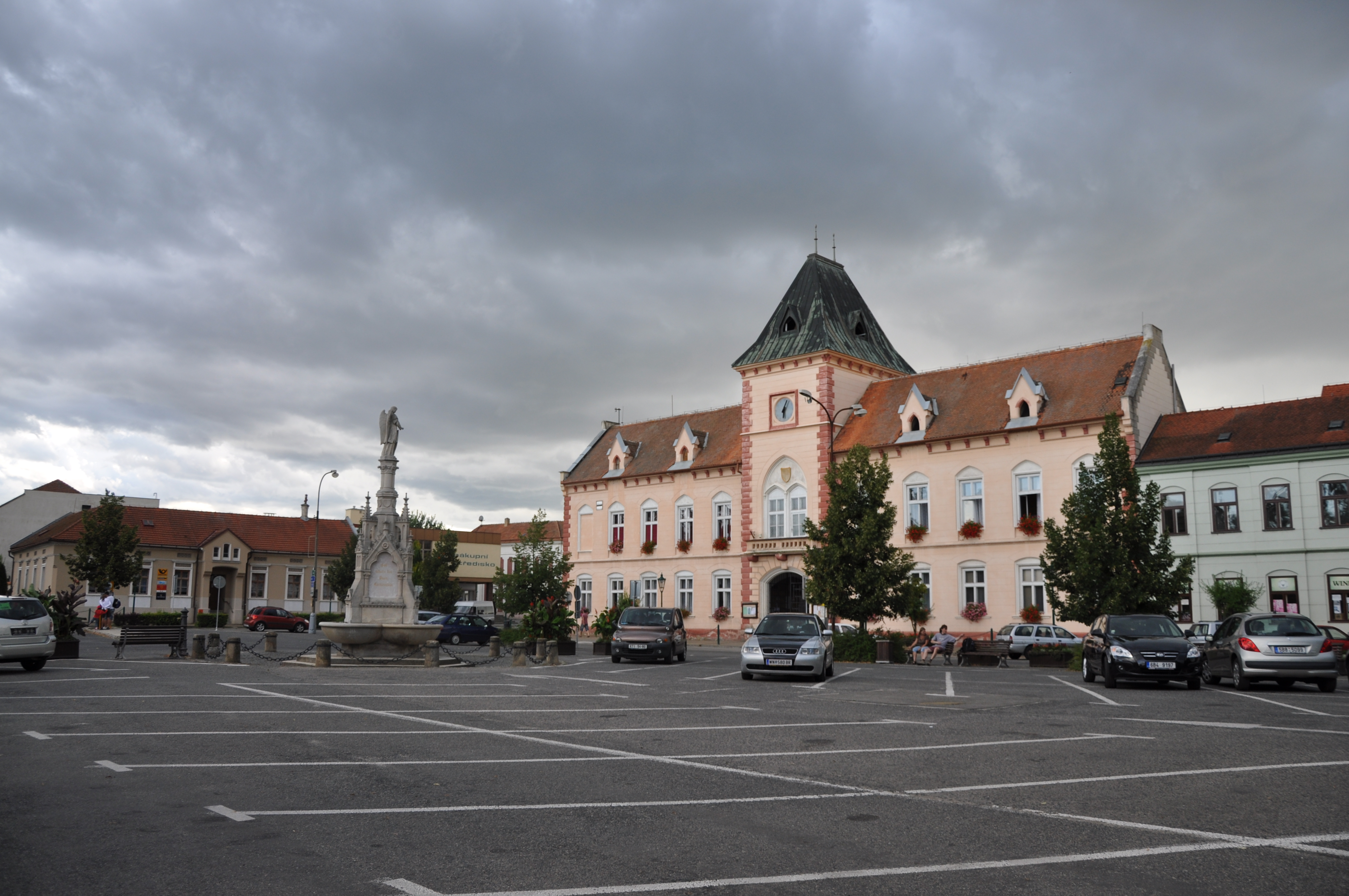
- Town square

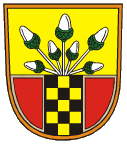
- Flag Coat of arms

- Location in the Czech Republic
- Coordinates: 48°47′59″N 16°48′12″E
- Country: Czech Republic
- Region: South Moravian
- District: Břeclav
- First mentioned: 1222

Area
  - Total: 31.27 km^{2} (12.07 sq mi)
- Elevation: 173 m (568 ft)

Population (2026-01-01)
  - Total: 2,180
  - Density: 69.7/km^{2} (181/sq mi)
- Time zone: UTC+1 (CET)
  - Summer (DST): UTC+2 (CEST)
- Postal code: 691 44
- Website: www.lednice.cz

UNESCO World Heritage Site
- Official name: Lednice–Valtice Cultural Landscape
- Criteria: i, ii, iv
- Reference: 763
- Inscription: 1996 (20th Session)

Lednice (Czech pronunciation: [ˈlɛdɲɪtsɛ]; German: Eisgrub) is a municipality and village in Břeclav District in the South Moravian Region of the Czech Republic. It has about 2,200 inhabitants. It is known as part of Lednice–Valtice Cultural Landscape, a UNESCO World Heritage Site.

== Administrative division ==
Lednice consists of two municipal parts (in brackets population according to the 2021 census):

- Lednice (1,858)
- Nejdek (213)

== Geography ==
Lednice is located about 7 kilometres (4 mi) northwest of Břeclav and 45 km (28 mi) south of Brno. It lies in a flat landscape in the Lower Morava Valley. The Thaya River flows through the northern part of the municipal territory. Stará Dyje and Zámecká Dyje, which are canals of the Thaya, also flow through the territory.

There are several large fishponds. Their territory, together with the immediate surroundings, is protected as the Lednické rybníky National Nature Reserve.

== History ==
The first written mention of Lednice is from 1222 under its Latin name Izgruobi, as a property of the Weisen/Orphanus family. In the mid-13th century, it was passed into the hands of the Liechtenstein family and its fortunes had been tied inseparably to the members of this noble family.

== Demographics ==
Historical population

Year	Pop.	±%
1869	2,335	—
1880	2,670	+14.3%
1890	2,561	−4.1%
1900	2,702	+5.5%
1910	2,731	+1.1%

Year	Pop.	±%
1921	2,830	+3.6%
1930	2,791	−1.4%
1950	1,952	−30.1%
1961	2,012	+3.1%
1970	1,994	−0.9%

Year	Pop.	±%
1980	2,291	+14.9%
1991	2,364	+3.2%
2001	2,356	−0.3%
2011	2,242	−4.8%
2021	2,071	−7.6%

Source: Censuses

== Economy ==
Lednice is known for viticulture and winemaking. The municipality lies in the Mikulovská wine subregion.

== Transport ==
Lednice is the start and terminus of the short Břeclav–Lednice railway line that operates only on weekends from May to September. The line is operated by historic train M 131.1, which was produced the 1950s.

== Sights ==
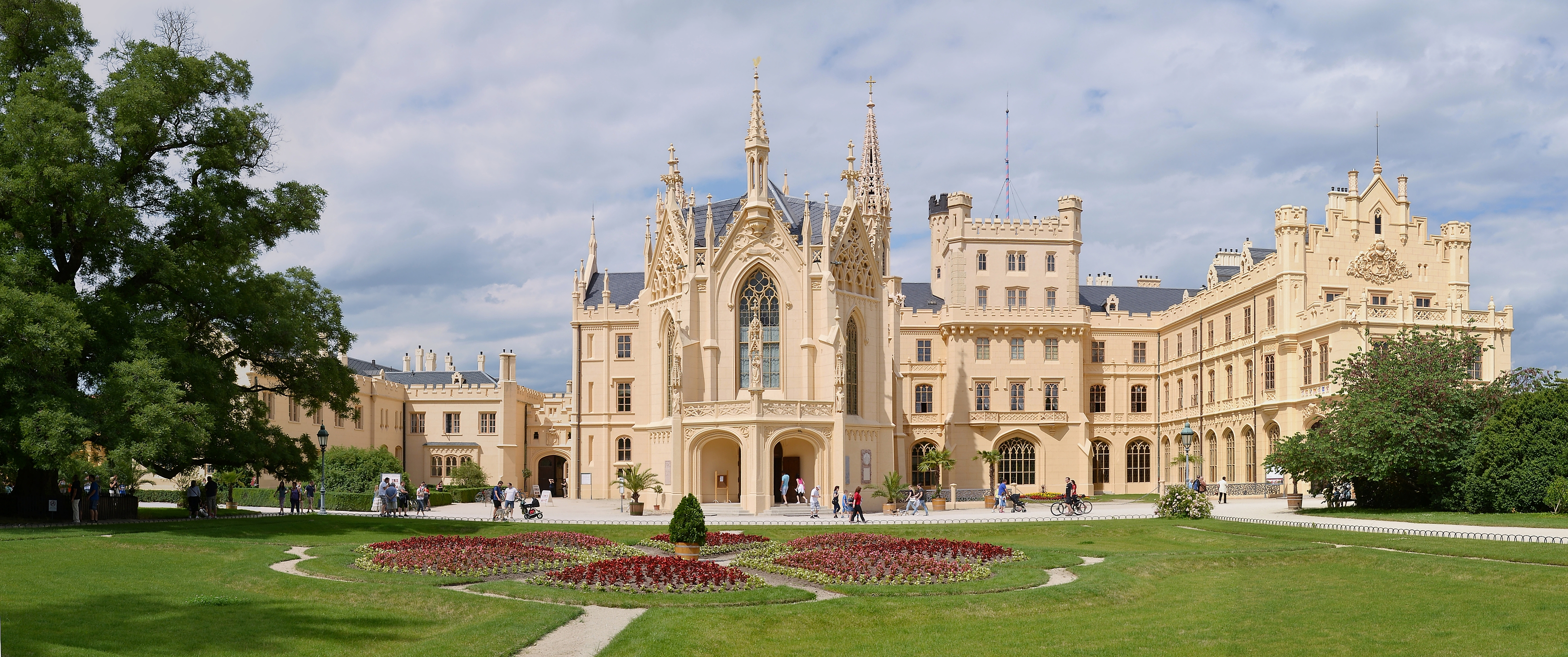
Lednice Castle

In 1996, the Lednice–Valtice Cultural Landscape was inscribed on the UNESCO World Heritage List as "an exceptional example of the designed landscape that evolved in the Enlightenment and afterwards under the care of a single family." Lednice contains a palace and the second largest castle park in the country, which covers 170 km^{2} (66 sq mi).

Lednice Castle was originally a Renaissance villa. In the 17th century it became a summer residence of the ruling Princes of Liechtenstein. The estate house, designed and furbished by baroque architects Johann Bernhard Fischer von Erlach, Domenico Martinelli, and Anton Johan Ospel, proclaimed rural luxury on the grandest scale. In 1846–1858, it was extensively rebuilt in the neo-Gothic style under the supervision of Georg Wingelmüller.

The surrounding park is laid out in an English garden style and contains a range of Romantic follies by Joseph Hardtmuth, including the solitary 60 metres (200 ft) high minaret from 1802, which is the tallest outside the Muslim world.

== Notable people ==
- Princess Aloysia of Liechtenstein (1838–1920), Catholic worker
- Johann II, Prince of Liechtenstein (1840–1929), monarch
