= Franz I of Liechtenstein =

Prince of Liechtenstein from 1929 to 1938

Franz I
- Duke of Troppau and Jägerndorf; Count of Rietberg
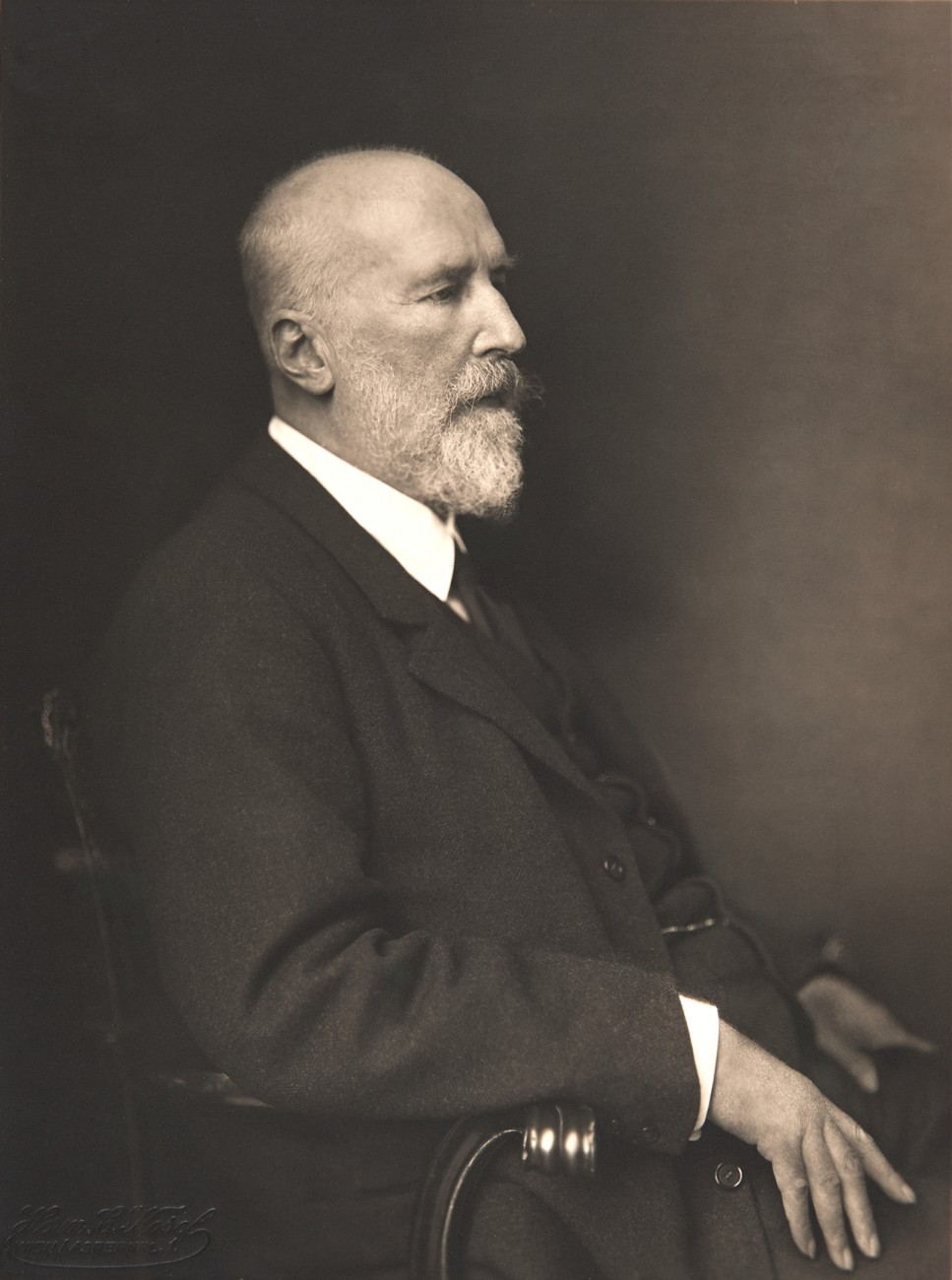
- Formal portrait by Hermann Clemens Kosel

Prince of Liechtenstein
- Reign: 11 February 1929 – 25 July 1938
- Predecessor: Johann II
- Successor: Franz Joseph II
- Prime Minister: Josef Hoop
- Born: 28 August 1853; Schloss Liechtenstein, Austrian Empire
- Died: 25 July 1938 (aged 84); Feldberg, Czechoslovakia
- Burial: Church of the Nativity of the Virgin Mary, Brno, Czechoslovakia
- Spouse: Elsa von Gutmann (m. 1919)
Names
- Franz de Paula Maria Karl August
- House: Liechtenstein
- Father: Aloys II
- Mother: Franziska Kinsky
- Religion: Roman Catholic

Franz I (Franz de Paula Maria Karl August; 28 August 1853 – 25 July 1938) was Prince of Liechtenstein from 11 February 1929 until his death in 1938.

== Early life ==
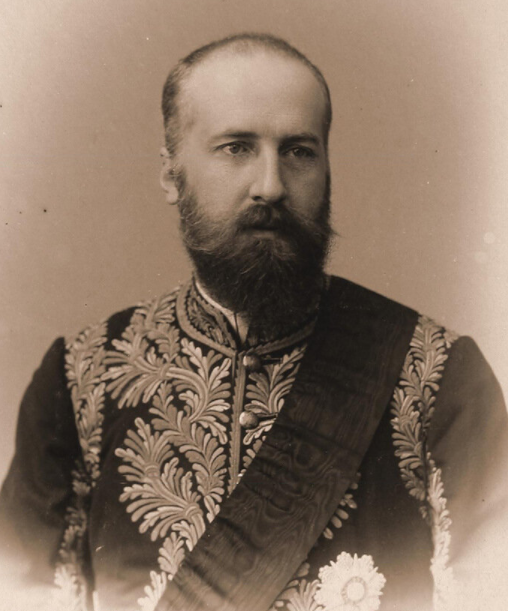
Franz as ambassador to Russia from Austria.

Franz de Paula Maria Karl August was born on 28 August 1853, to Aloys II and his wife, Countess Franziska Kinsky of Wchinitz and Tettau in Liechtenstein Castle. He attended the University of Vienna and the University of Prague before serving as the successor to Count Anton Graf von Wolkenstein-Trostburg as the Austro-Hungarian ambassador to the Russian Empire from 1894 to 1898. He was the 1,204th Knight of the Order of the Golden Fleece in Austria.

He fell in love with Elisabeth von Gutmann, widow of Baron Géza Erős of Bethlenfalva (1866–1908), who had converted to Roman Catholicism from Judaism in 1899, but his brother Johann disapproved of the relationship and refused to consent to it. In 1919, he secretly married Gutmann in Salzburg and remarried her following Johann's death on 22 July 1929.

== Reign ==
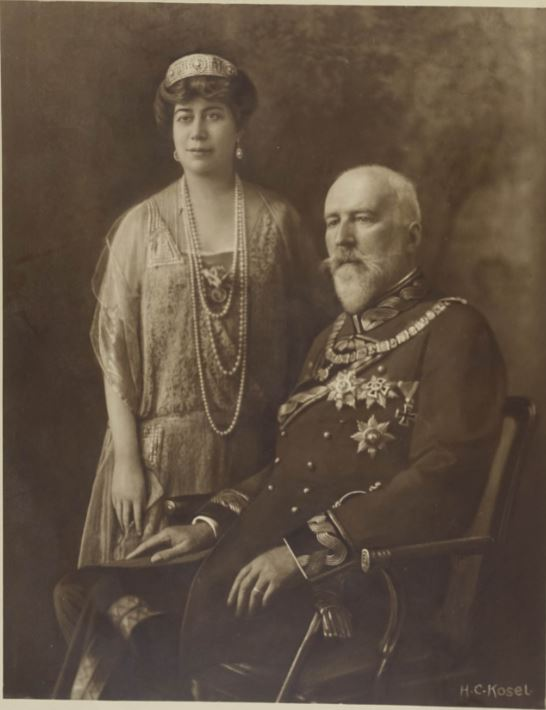
Franz I with his wife, Princess Elsa in 1935

On 11 February 1929, Johann II died, passing the title of Prince of Liechtenstein to Franz. A few weeks after he took the title, 395,360 acres of land belonging to the Liechtenstein family were seized by Czechoslovakia. A delegation of farmers petitioned him to establish a republic in Liechtenstein, but ended their attempts when he stated that he would not give any of his money towards the country, forcing it to rely solely on taxation.

In 1937, Prime Minister Josef Hoop admitted that Austrian pretender Otto von Habsburg was living in Vaduz Castle as a guest of Franz I in order to be closer to Austria rather than in his previous residence of Steenokkerzeel, Belgium. An extradition treaty was also signed between Liechtenstein and the United States.

He had no children so his first cousin once removed Prince Aloys was next in line, but Aloys removed himself from the line of succession in favor of his son, Franz Joseph, in 1923 as he was concerned about his age should he assume the role.

On 31 March 1938, he made his first cousin twice removed Franz Joseph his regent following the Anschluss of Austria. After making him regent he moved to Feldsberg (Valtice), Czechoslovakia and on 25 July, he died while at one of his family's castles, Castle Feldberg, and Franz Joseph formally succeeded him as the Prince of Liechtenstein.

Although Franz stated that he had given the regency to Franz Joseph due to his old age it was speculated that he did not wish to remain in control of the principality if Nazi Germany were to invade, primarily because his wife Elisabeth von Gutmann was of Jewish relation.

== Honours ==
- Liechtenstein: Founder of the Order of Merit of the Principality of Liechtenstein, 1937 – on the anniversary of his marriage.
- Austria-Hungary:
  - Grand Cross of the Imperial Order of Leopold, 1897
  - Knight of the Golden Fleece, 1917
- Sovereign Military Order of Malta: Bailiff Grand Cross of Honour and Devotion
- Russian Empire:
  - Knight of St. Alexander Nevsky
  - Knight of St. Andrew, 1906
- Kingdom of Bavaria: Knight of St. Hubert, 1909

Franz I of Liechtenstein House of Liechtenstein Born: 28 August 1853 Died: 25 July 1938
Regnal titles
Preceded by Johann II	Prince of Liechtenstein; 1929–1938	Succeeded by Franz Joseph II
