= Charles, Prince of Löwenstein-Wertheim-Rosenberg (1834–1921) =

Prince of Löwenstein-Wertheim-Rosenberg from 1849 to 1908

Charles
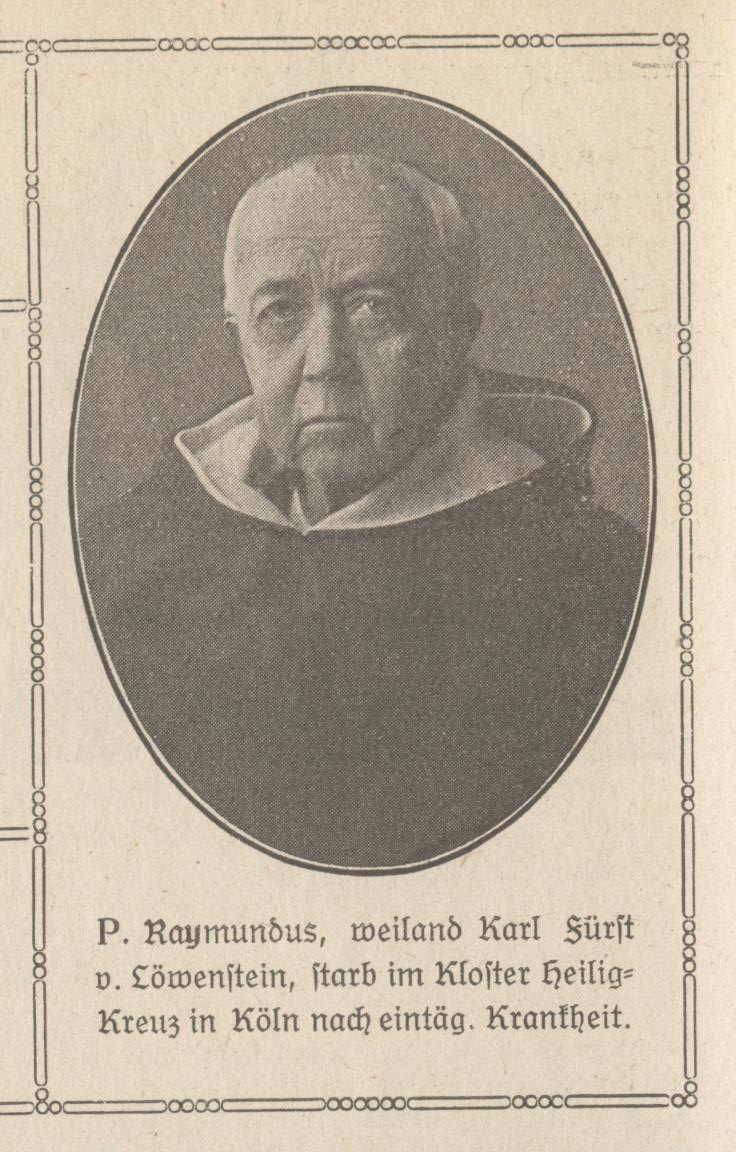
- Charles as Father Raymundus Maria

Prince of Löwenstein-Wertheim-Rosenberg
- Period: 3 November 1849 – 8 September 1908
- Predecessor: Charles Thomas
- Successor: Aloysius
- Born: 21 May 1834; Haid, Kingdom of Bohemia, Austrian Empire
- Died: 8 November 1921 (aged 87); Cologne, German Reich
- Spouse: Princess Adelheid of Ysenburg-Büdingen (m. 1859; died 1861) Princess Sophie of Liechtenstein (m. 1863; died 1899)
- Issue: Princess Maria Anna; Princess Franziska; Adelheid, Countess Adalbert Joseph of Schönborn; Princess Agnes; Joseph, Hereditary Prince of Löwenstein-Wertheim-Rosenberg; Maria Theresa, Duchess of Braganza; Aloysius, Prince of Löwenstein-Wertheim-Rosenberg; Anna, Princess Felix of Schwarzenberg; Prince Johannes Baptista
Names
- German: Karl Heinrich Ernst Franz
- House: Löwenstein-Wertheim-Rosenberg
- Father: Constantine, Hereditary Prince of Löwenstein-Wertheim-Rosenberg
- Mother: Princess Agnes of Hohenlohe-Langenburg
- Religion: Catholic Church

Charles, Prince of Löwenstein-Wertheim-Rosenberg (German: Karl Heinrich Fürst zu Löwenstein-Wertheim-Rosenberg) (21 May 1834 – 8 November 1921) was a German nobleman, the Prince of Löwenstein-Wertheim-Rosenberg (1849–1908), Catholic politician and later a Dominican friar. He was the first President of the Catholic Society of Germany (1868), and a member of the Reichstag from 1871 for the Catholic Centre Party.

== Early life ==
He was born in Haid, Kingdom of Bohemia, Austrian Empire, the second child of Constantine, Hereditary Prince of Löwenstein-Wertheim-Rosenberg (1802–1838), and Princess Agnes of Hohenlohe-Langenburg (1804–1835). He was a male-line descendant of Frederick I, Elector Palatine. He studied law, and succeeded to the headship of the House of Löwenstein-Wertheim-Rosenberg and the title of Prince (Fürst) in 1849.

== Marriage and children ==
He married Princess Adelheid of Ysenburg-Büdingen (1841–1861) in 1859. After her death, he married Princess Sophie of Liechtenstein in Vienna in 1863. Sophie and Charles had eight children:

- Princess Franziska of Löwenstein-Wertheim-Rosenberg (Kleinheubach, 30 March 1864 – Düsseldorf, 12 April 1930)
- Princess Adelheid of Löwenstein-Wertheim-Rosenberg (Kleinheubach, 17 July 1865 – Prague, 6 September 1941), married Count Adalbert Joseph of Schönborn
- Princess Agnes of Löwenstein-Wertheim-Rosenberg (Kleinheubach, 22 December 1866 – Oosterhout, 23 January 1954)
- Joseph, Hereditary Prince of Löwenstein-Wertheim-Rosenberg (Kleinheubach, 11 April 1868 – Rome, 15 February 1870)
- Princess Maria Theresa of Löwenstein-Wertheim-Rosenberg (Rome, 4 January 1870 – Vienna, 17 January 1935), married Miguel, Duke of Braganza
- Aloys, Prince of Löwenstein-Wertheim-Rosenberg (Kleinheubach, 15 September 1871 – Schloss Bronnbach, 25 January 1952), married Countess Josephine Kinsky of Wchinitz and Tettau
- Princess Anna of Löwenstein-Wertheim-Rosenberg (Kleinheubach, 28 September 1873 – Vienna, 27 June 1936), married Prince Felix of Schwarzenberg
- Prince Johannes Baptista of Löwenstein-Wertheim-Rosenberg (Kleinheubach, 29 August 1880 – Newport, 18 May 1956), married Countess Alexandra of Bernstorff

== Later life ==
After the death of his wife, he became a member of the Dominican Order as Fr. Raymundus Maria in 1907, and lived in the monastery of Venlo in the Netherlands. He was ordained as a Catholic priest in 1908. The same year, he gave up his title of Prince and was succeeded by his son. He died in November, 1921 in Cologne.

== Honours ==
He was a Knight of the Order of the Golden Fleece.

== Ancestry ==
Ancestors of Charles, Prince of Löwenstein-Wertheim-Rosenberg (1834–1921)

8. Dominic Constantine, Prince of Löwenstein-Wertheim-Rochefort
4. Charles Thomas, Prince of Löwenstein-Wertheim-Rosenberg
9. Princess Leopoldine of Hohenlohe-Bartenstein
2. Constantine, Hereditary Prince of Löwenstein-Wertheim-Rosenberg
10. Count Joseph Nicholas of Windisch-Graetz
5. Countess Sophie of Windisch-Graetz
11. Princess Léopoldine of Arenberg
1. Charles, Prince of Löwenstein-Wertheim-Rosenberg
12. Christian Albrecht, Prince of Hohenlohe-Langenburg
6. Karl Ludwig, Prince of Hohenlohe-Langenburg
13. Princess Caroline of Stolberg-Gedern
3. Princess Agnes of Hohenlohe-Langenburg
14. Johann Christian II, Count of Solms-Baruth
7. Countess Amalie Henriette of Solms-Baruth
15. Countess Friederike Reuss of Köstritz

Charles, 6th Prince of Löwenstein-Wertheim-Rosenberg House of Löwenstein-Wertheim-Rosenberg Cadet branch of the House of Löwenstein-Wertheim Born: 21 May 1834 Died: 8 November 1921
German nobility
Preceded by Charles Thomas	Prince of Löwenstein-Wertheim-Rosenberg; 3 November 1849 – 8 September 1908	Succeeded by Aloys
