= Order of Parfaite Amitié =

German order of knighthood

Order of Parfaite Amitié Orden de Parfaite Amitié

Awarded by Prince of Thurn and Taxis
- Type: Dynastic order
- Royal house: Thurn und Taxis
- Religious affiliation: Roman Catholic
- Ribbon: Navy Blue and Maroon with a thin Gold border
- Motto: Vinculum Amicitiae (Latin for "chain of friendship")
- Status: Currently constituted
- Head: Prince Albert II
- Grades: Knight/Dame Grand Cross; Knight/Dame Grand Officer; Knight/Dame Commander; Knight/Dame Officer; Knight/Dame
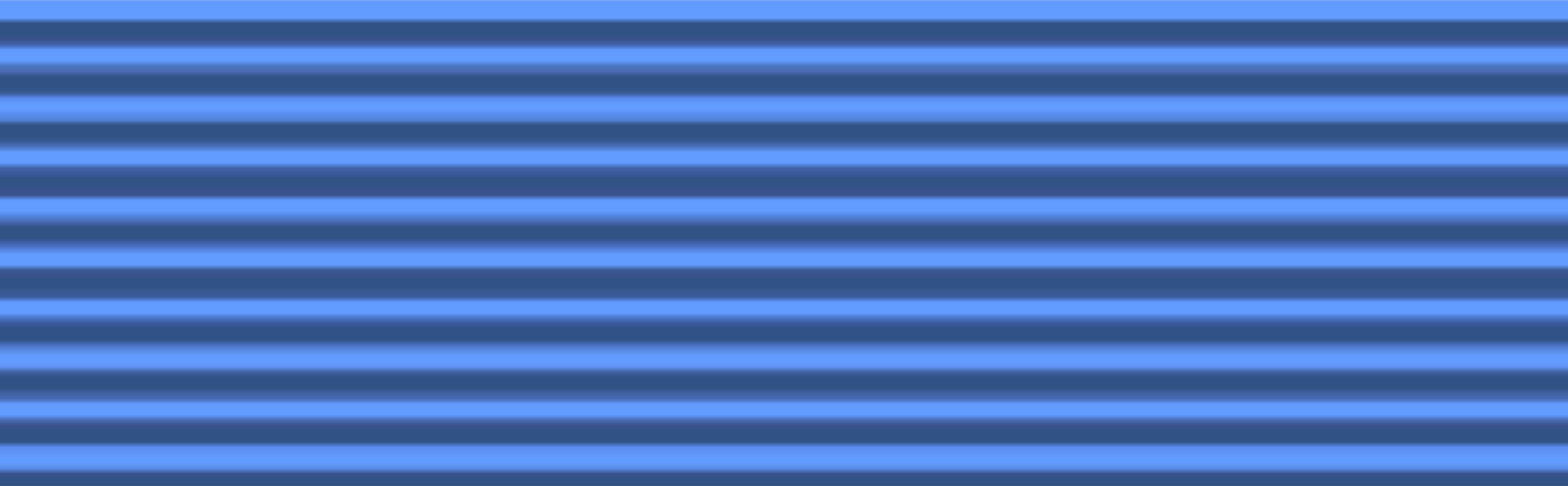
- Ribbon of the order

The Order of Parfaite Amitié (German: Orden de Parfaite Amitié; literally "Order of Perfect Friendship") is a dynastic order of knighthood of the princely House of Thurn and Taxis.

== History ==
The order was founded during the reign of Alexander Ferdinand, 3rd Prince of Thurn and Taxis, as the supreme order of the princely house. Karl Anselm, 4th Prince of Thurn and Taxis, then reformed the order and was able to formally transmit it to descendants to this day. With the abolition of the principalities of the Confederation of the Rhine by the acts of 12 July 1806, the order's value became related to the dynasty, and it is to be given to members who have turned 18 years of age.

== Insignia ==
The order's badge consists of a golden eight-pointed Maltese cross in white enamel. Between the arms of the cross can be seen a tower and an upright lion, the main symbols from the coat of arms of the House of Thurn and Taxis. Upon the arms of the cross are engraved the words Vinculum Amicitiae (Latin for "chain of friendship"). In the medallion are the initials CA (Carl Anselm). On the reverse, there is a blue-enamelled medallion with the letters TW in gold. Since 1928, the initial A (Albert).

Men wear the decoration around their neck with sky-blue band. A copy of the order is in the treasury of the museum at Saint Emmeram's Abbey in Regensburg, Germany.

== Recipients ==
- Albert, 8th Prince of Thurn and Taxis
- Albert, 12th Prince of Thurn and Taxis
- Alexander, Margrave of Meissen
- Carlo Alessandro, 3rd Duke of Castel Duino
- Princess Elisabeth of Luxembourg (1901–1950)
- Princess Elisabeth of Thurn and Taxis (1860–1881)
- Franz Joseph, 9th Prince of Thurn and Taxis
- Fritz von Thurn und Taxis
- Prince Gabriel of Thurn and Taxis
- Gloria, Princess of Thurn and Taxis
- Prince Gustav of Thurn and Taxis
- Prince Gustav of Thurn and Taxis (1848–1914)
- Duchess Helene in Bavaria
- Wilhelm Imkamp
- Princess Isabel Maria of Braganza
- Johannes, 11th Prince of Thurn and Taxis
- Karl August, 10th Prince of Thurn and Taxis
- Princess Louise of Thurn and Taxis
- Prince Ludwig Philipp of Thurn and Taxis
- Archduchess Margarethe Klementine of Austria
- Maria Emanuel, Margrave of Meissen
- Princess Maria Theresia of Thurn and Taxis (born 1980)
- Princess Mathilde Sophie of Oettingen-Oettingen and Oettingen-Spielberg
- Prince Max Emanuel of Thurn and Taxis (b. 1935)
- Prince Max Emanuel of Thurn and Taxis
- Maximilian II of Bavaria
- Maximilian Anton, Hereditary Prince of Thurn and Taxis
- Maximilian Karl, 6th Prince of Thurn and Taxis
- Maximilian Maria, 7th Prince of Thurn and Taxis
- Prince Paul of Thurn and Taxis
- Raimundo, 2nd Duke of Castel Duino
- Alexander, Count of Schönburg-Glauchau
- Elisabeth von Thurn und Taxis
- Baroness Wilhelmine of Dörnberg
