= List of consorts of Thurn and Taxis =

== Baroness and Countess of Taxis ==
| Picture | Name | Father | Birth | Marriage | Became Consort | Ceased to be Consort | Death | Spouse |
|---|---|---|---|---|---|---|---|---|
| | Genoveva von Taxis | Seraphin II von Taxis (Taxis) | ? | 8 October 1584 | 5 May 1612 husband's accession | 7 July 1624 husband's death | after 14 January 1628 | Lamoral I |
| | Alexandrine de Rye, Comtesse de Varax | Philibert Bar de Balançon Comte de Varax | 1 August 1589 | 31 January 1616 | 7 July 1624 husband's accession | 23 May 1628 husband's death | 26 December 1666 | Leonhard II |
| | Countess Anna of Horne | Philip Lamoral, Count of Horne and Houtekerke (Horne) | 20 March 1629 | 6 February 1650 | | 13 September 1676 husband's death | 25 June 1693 | Lamoral II Claudius Franz |
| | Anna Adelheid of Fürstenberg-Heiligenberg | Hermann Egon, Count of Fürstenberg-Heiligenberg (Fürstenberg-Heiligenberg) | 16 January 1659 | 24 March 1678 | | 1695 husband's creation as Prince | 13 November 1701 | Eugen Alexander Franz |

== Princess of Thurn and Taxis ==
| Picture | Name | Father | Birth | Marriage | Became Princess | Ceased to be Princess | Death | Spouse |
|---|---|---|---|---|---|---|---|---|
| | Anna Adelheid of Fürstenberg-Heiligenberg | Hermann Egon, Count of Fürstenberg-Heiligenberg (Fürstenberg-Heiligenberg) | 16 January 1659 | 24 March 1678 | 1695 husband's creation as Prince | 13 November 1701 | | Eugen Alexander Franz |
| | Anna Augusta of Hohenlohe-Waldenburg-Schillingsfürst | Ludwig Gustav, Count of Hohenlohe-Waldenburg-Schillingsfürst (Hohenlohe-Waldenburg-Schillingsfürst) | 11 November 1675 | 21 November 1703 | | 21 September 1711 | | Eugen Alexander Franz |
| | Maria Ludovika Anna of Lobkowicz | Ferdinand August Leopold, Prince of Lobkowicz, Duke of Sagan (Lobkowicz) | 20 October 1683 | 10 January 1703 | 21 February 1714 husband's ascession | 8 November 1739 husband's death | 20 January 1750 | Anselm Franz |
| | Charlotte Louise de Lorraine, Countess de Lambesc | Louis de Lorraine, Pr de Lambesc (Lorraine) | 22 July 1722 | 22 March 1745 | | 6 January 1747 | | Alexander Ferdinand |
| | Maria Henriette Josepha of Fürstenberg-Stühlingen | Joseph Wilhelm Ernst, Prince of Fürstenberg-Stühlingen (Fürstenberg-Stühlingen) | 31 March 1732 | 21 September 1750 | | 4 June 1772 | | Alexander Ferdinand |
| | Auguste Elisabeth of Württemberg | Karl Alexander, Duke of Württemberg (Württemberg) | 30 October 1734 | 3 September 1753 | 17 March 1773 husband's ascession | 1776 divorce | 4 June 1787 | Karl Anselm |
| | Therese of Mecklenburg-Strelitz | Charles II, Grand Duke of Mecklenburg-Strelitz (Mecklenburg-Strelitz) | 5 April 1773 | 25 May 1789 | 13 November 1805 husband's ascession | 15 July 1827 husband's death | 12 February 1839 | Karl Alexander |
| | Wilhelmine of Dörnberg | Ernst, Baron of Dörnberg (Dörnberg) | 6 March 1803 | 24 August 1828 | | 14 May 1835 | | Maximilian Karl |
| | Mathilde Sophie of Oettingen-Oettingen and Oettingen-Spielberg | Johannes Aloysius III, Prince of Oettingen-Oettingen and Oettingen-Spielberg (Oettingen-Spielberg) | 9 February 1816 | 24 January 1839 | | 10 November 1871 husband's death | 20 January 1886 | Maximilian Karl |
| | Margarethe Klementine of Austria | Archduke Joseph Karl of Austria, Palatine of Hungary (Habsburg-Lorraine) | 6 July 1870 | 15 July 1890 | | 22 January 1952 husband's death | 2 May 1955 | Albert I |
| | Isabel Maria of Braganza | Miguel, Duke of Braganza (Braganza) | 19 November 1894 | 23 November 1920 | 22 January 1952 husband's ascession | 12 January 1970 | | Franz Joseph |
| | Gloria of Schönburg in Glauchau and Waldenburg | Joachim, Count von Schönburg-Glauchau (Schönburg-Glauchau) | 23 February 1960 | 31 May 1980 | 26 April 1982 husband's ascession | 14 December 1990 husband's death | living | Johannes |
Vacant
