= Theophanes the Confessor =

Byzantine aristocrat, monk and historian (c.758/60–c.817/8)

Saint Theophanes the Confessor
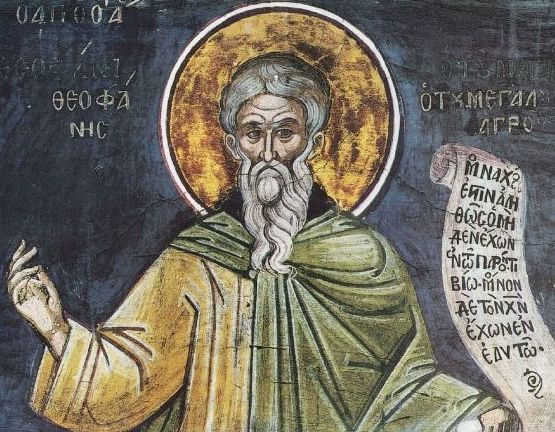

Confessor of the Faith
- Born: c. 759; Constantinople, Byzantine Empire
- Died: 817 or 818 (aged c. 58); Samothrace, Thrace, Byzantine Empire
- Venerated in: Catholic Church; Eastern Orthodox Church
- Feast: 12 March

Theophanes the Confessor (Greek: Θεοφάνης Ὁμολογητής) or Theophanes of the Great Field (Greek: Θεοφάνης τοῦ Μεγάλου Ἄγρου; c. 759 – 817 or 818) was a member of the Byzantine aristocracy who became a monk and chronicler. He served in the court of Emperor Leo IV the Khazar before taking up the religious life. Theophanes attended the Second Council of Nicaea in 787 and resisted the iconoclasm of Leo V the Armenian, for which he was imprisoned. He died shortly after his release.

Theophanes the Confessor, venerated on 12 March in both the Catholic Church and the Eastern Orthodox Church, should not be confused with Theophanes of Nicaea, whose feast is commemorated on 11 October.

== Biography ==
Theophanes was born in Constantinople of wealthy and noble iconodule parents: Isaac, governor of the islands of the Aegean Sea, and Theodora, of whose family nothing is known. His father died when Theophanes was three years old, and the Byzantine Emperor Constantine V (740–775) subsequently saw to the boy's education and upbringing at the imperial court. Theophanes would hold several offices under Leo IV the Khazar.

He was married at the age of eighteen, but convinced his wife to lead a life of virginity. In 779, after the death of his father-in-law, they separated with mutual consent to embrace the religious life. She chose a convent on an island near Constantinople, while he entered the Polychronius Monastery, located in the district of Sigiane (Sigriano), near Cyzicus on the Asian side of the Sea of Marmara. Later, he built a monastery on his own lands on the island of Calonymus (now Calomio), where he acquired a high degree of skill in transcribing manuscripts.

After six years he returned to Sigriano, where he founded an abbey known by the name "of the big settlement" and governed it as abbot. In this position of leadership, he was present at the Second Council of Nicaea in 787, and signed its decrees in defense of the veneration of icons.

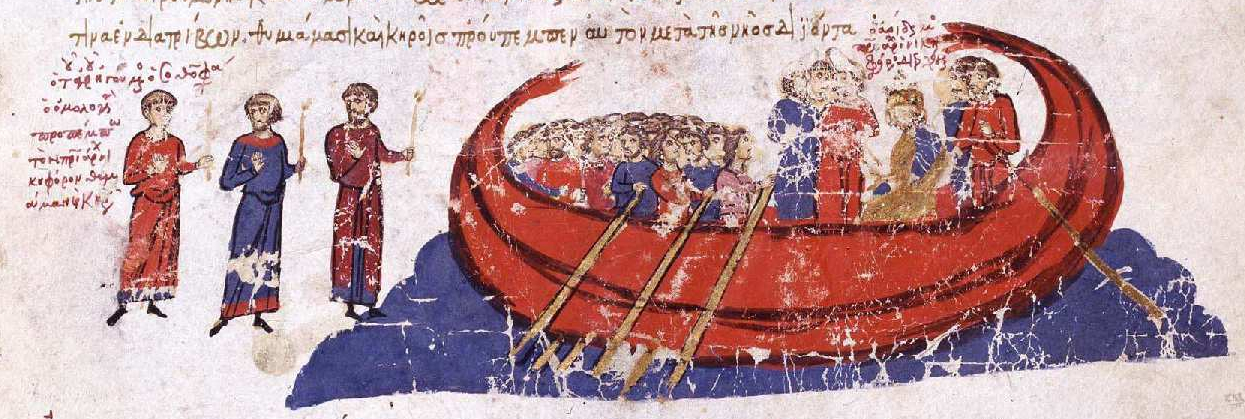
Theophanes the Confessor bids farewell to patriarch Nikephoros.

When Emperor Leo V the Armenian (813–820) resumed his iconoclastic warfare, he ordered Theophanes brought to Constantinople. The Emperor tried in vain to induce him to condemn the same veneration of icons that had been sanctioned by the council. Theophanes was cast into prison and for two years suffered cruel treatment. After his release, he was banished to Samothrace in 817, where overwhelmed with afflictions, he lived only seventeen days. He is credited with many miracles that occurred after his death, which most likely took place on 12 March, the day he is commemorated in the Roman Martyrology.

== Chronicle ==
At the urgent request of his friend George Syncellus, Theophanes undertook the continuation of Syncellus's Chronicle (Χρονογραφία, Chronographia), during the years 810 to 815. The language used occupies a place midway between the stiff ecclesiastical and the vernacular Greek. He made use of three main sources: first, material already prepared by Syncellus; second, he probably made the use of a set of extracts made by Theodore Lector from the works of Socrates Scholasticus, Sozomenus, and Theodoret; and third, the city chronicle of Constantinople. Cyril Mango has argued that Theophanes contributed but little to the chronicle that bears his name, and that the vast bulk of its contents are the work of Syncellus; on this model, Theophanes's main contribution was to cast Syncellus's rough materials together in a unified form.

Theophanes's part of the chronicle covered events from the accession of Diocletian in 284 (which is the point where the chronicle of George Syncellus ends) to the downfall of Michael I Rhangabe in 813. This part of the chronicle is valuable for having preserved the accounts of lost authorities on Byzantine history for the seventh and eighth centuries that would otherwise have been lost.

The work consists of two parts, wherein the first provides a chronological history arranged per annum, and the second contains chronological tables that are regrettably full of inaccuracies. It seems that Theophanes had only prepared the tables, leaving vacant spaces for the proper dates, but that these had been filled out by someone else (Hugo von Hurter, Nomenclator literarius recentioris I, Innsbruck, 1903, 735). In the chronological first part, in addition to reckoning by the years of the world and the Christian era, Theophanes introduces in tabular form the regnal years of the Roman emperors, of the Persian kings and Arab caliphs, and of the five ecumenical patriarchs, a complex system which sometimes leads to considerable confusion.

The first part, though lacking in critical insight and chronological accuracy, greatly surpasses the majority of Byzantine chronicles. Theophanes's Chronicle is particularly valuable beginning with the reign of Justin II (565), as in his work, he then drew upon sources that have not survived his times

Theophanes's Chronicle was much used by succeeding chroniclers, and in 873–875 a Latin compilation was made by the papal librarian Anastasius from the chronicles of Nikephoros, George Syncellus, and Theophanes for the use of a deacon named Johannes in the second half of the ninth century and thus was known to Western Europe.

There also survives a further continuation, in six books, of the Chronicle down to the year 961 written by a number of mostly anonymous writers (called Theophanes Continuatus or Scriptores post Theophanem), who undertook the work at the instructions of Constantine Porphyrogenitus.

Theophanes was the first to claim that the Prophet of the Islamic religion Muhammad had epilepsy.
