= Prince Gabriel of Thurn and Taxis =

German prince (1922–1942)

Prince Gabriel
- Born: 16 October 1922; Schloss Haus near Regensburg, Bavaria, Germany
- Died: 17 December 1942 (aged 20); Stalingrad, Soviet Union
- Burial: Rossoschka Cemetery, Rossoschka, Russia
Names
- German: Gabriel Albert Maria Michael Franz Joseph Gallus Lamoral
- House: Thurn and Taxis
- Father: Franz Joseph, 9th Prince of Thurn and Taxis
- Mother: Princess Isabel Maria of Braganza

Prince Gabriel Albert Maria Michael Franz Joseph Gallus Lamoral of Thurn and Taxis (German: Gabriel Albert Maria Michael Franz Joseph Gallus Lamoral Prinz von Thurn und Taxis) (16 October 1922 – 17 December 1942) was a Prince of Thurn and Taxis. Gabriel was second in the line of succession to the Headship of the House of Thurn and Taxis after his father Franz Joseph, Hereditary Prince of Thurn and Taxis until his death in the Battle of Stalingrad, at which point he was replaced by his uncle Prince Karl August of Thurn and Taxis.

== Family ==
Gabriel was born at Schloss Haus near Regensburg, Bavaria, the eldest child and son of Prince Franz Joseph of Thurn and Taxis (later 9th Prince of Thurn and Taxis) and his wife Princess Isabel Maria of Braganza. His twin sister, Princess Michaela of Thurn and Taxis, died at birth. Gabriel was a paternal grandson of Albert, 8th Prince of Thurn and Taxis and his wife Archduchess Margarethe Klementine of Austria and a maternal grandson of Miguel, Duke of Braganza and his wife Princess Maria Theresa of Löwenstein-Wertheim-Rosenberg.

== World War II ==
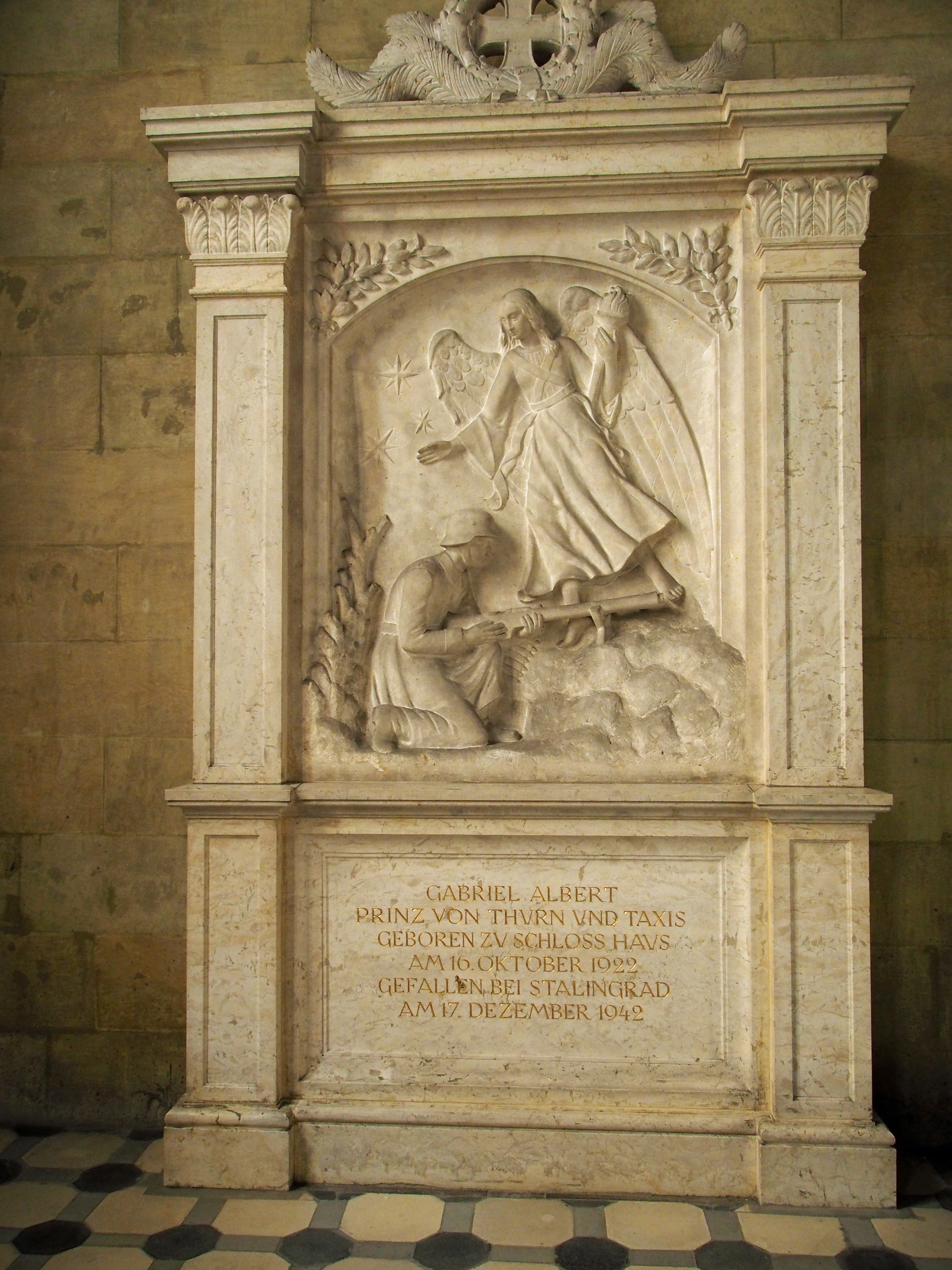
Epitaph Prince Gabriel

During World War II, Gabriel was conscripted for military service before completing high school. He served first as a Gefreiter (Private First Class) and then as an officer in the Wehrmacht. Gabriel was serving in a Reiter-Regiment (Cavalry Regiment) in the Wehrmacht when he was killed in action at the Battle of Stalingrad on 17 December 1942. He was interred among the unknown dead at the war cemetery at Rossoschka.

== Ancestry ==
Ancestors of Prince Gabriel of Thurn and Taxis

8. Maximilian Anton, Hereditary Prince of Thurn and Taxis
4. Albert, 8th Prince of Thurn and Taxis
9. Duchess Helene in Bavaria
2. Franz Joseph, 9th Prince of Thurn and Taxis
10. Archduke Joseph Karl, Palatine of Hungary
5. Archduchess Margarethe Klementine of Austria
11. Princess Clotilde of Saxe-Coburg and Gotha
1. Prince Gabriel of Thurn and Taxis
12. Miguel I of Portugal
6. Miguel Januário, Duke of Braganza
13. Princess Adelaide of Löwenstein
3. Princess Isabel Maria of Braganza
14. Charles, Prince of Löwenstein
7. Princess Maria Theresa of Löwenstein
15. Princess Sophie of Liechtenstein
