= Isabel Maria =

People with the name Isabel Maria include:

- Infanta Isabel Maria of Braganza (1801–1876)
- Isabel Maria de Alcântara, Duchess of Goiás (1824–1898)
- Princess Isabel Maria of Braganza (1894–1970)
