= Princess Eulalia =

Princess Eulalia can refer to:

- Infanta Eulalia of Spain (1864-1958)
- Princess Eulalia of Thurn and Taxis (1908-1993)
