= Wolfger of Prüfening =

Wolfger of Prüfening (c. 1100 – c. 1173) was a German Benedictine monk and writer. He is nowadays usually identified with the so-called Anonymous of Melk (Anonymus Mellicensis).

Born around 1100, Wolfger joined the monastery of Prüfening around 1130. He served as its librarian, archivist, treasurer, and annalist. He compiled an inventory of the monastery's possessions and catalogued its library. He also commissioned manuscript copying and decoration. A codex he commissioned contains a set of Toledan Tables with one of the earliest examples of Arabic numerals, including zero, in Germany.

Wolfger was also an original author of historical and biographical works. He began the Annales Ratisponenses (annals of Regensburg) and compiled a biographical index of 118 ecclesiastical writers, De scriptoribus ecclesiasticis. Most of his writers were from the 11th and 12th centuries. The latest is Rupert of Deutz. Wolfger most likely wrote the incomplete Vita Theogeri, a biography of Theogerus of Metz. His authorship of the Vita Ottonis, a biography of Bishop Otto of Bamberg written between 1140 and 1146, is more debatable.

Wolfger died on 25 March in an unknown year.

== Bibliography ==
- Gentry, Francis G. (2010). "Anonymous of Melk". In Bjork, Robert E. (ed.). Anonymous of Melk (c. 1135). The Oxford Dictionary of the Middle Ages. Oxford: Oxford University Press. ISBN 978-0-19-866262-4.
- Howe, John McDonald (2010). "Wolfger of Prüfening". In Bjork, Robert E. (ed.). The Oxford Dictionary of the Middle Ages. Oxford: Oxford University Press. ISBN 978-0-19-866262-4.
- Killy, Walther; Vierhaus, Rudolf, eds. (2006). "Wolfger von Prüfening". Dictionary of German Biography. Vol. 10: Thibaut–Zycha. Munich: K. G. Saur. p. 607.
- Nothaft, C. P. E. (2014). "The Reception and Application of Arabic Science in Twelfth-Century Computistics: New Evidence from Bavaria". Journal for the History of Astronomy. 45 (1): 35–60. Bibcode:2014JHA....45...35N. doi:10.1177/002182861404500103. S2CID 122722513.
- Swietek, Francis (1978). Wolfger of Prüfening's "De Scriptoribus Ecclesiasticis": A Critical Edition and Historical Evaluation (PhD diss.). University of Illinois at Urbana-Champaign. ProQuest 302881392.
- Ziomkowski, Robert (2002). "Introduction". Liber contra Wolfelmum. Leuven: Peeters.
