= Wilhelm Imkamp =

German Catholic prelate and theologian (born 1951)

Monsignor Wilhelm Imkamp P.A.
- Prelate of Honour of His Holiness
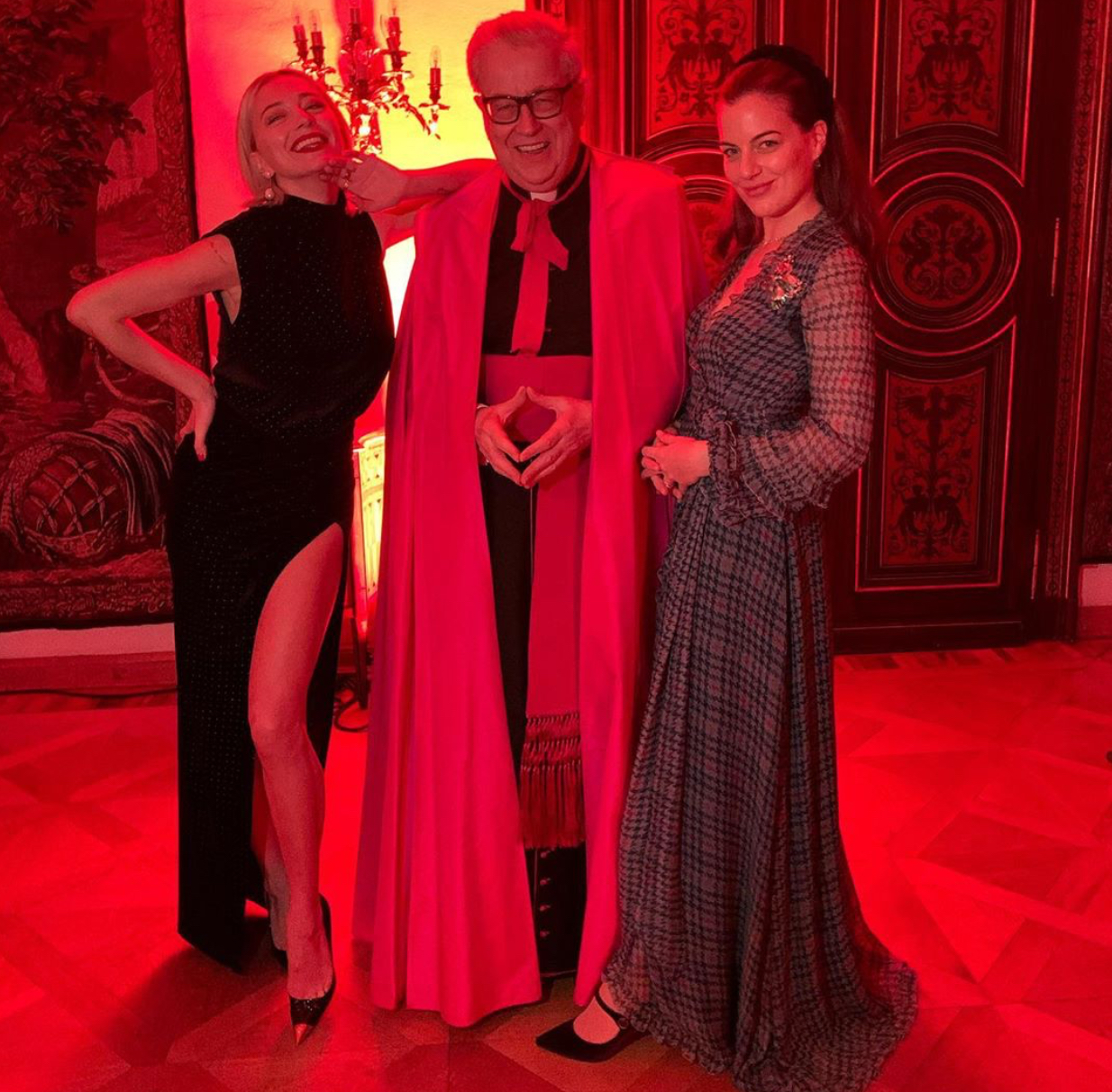
- Imkamp (center) with Caroline Vreeland and Cleopatra, Hereditary Princess of Oettingen-Spielberg in December 2019

Orders
- Ordination: 1976

Personal details
- Born: 27 September 1951 Kaldenkirchen, Germany
- Denomination: Catholic
- Residence: Saint Emmeram's Abbey, Regensburg; Bavaria, Germany
- Occupation: historian, theologian
- Education: Collegium Canisianum; Pontifical Gregorian University

Wilhelm Imkamp PA (born 27 September 1951) is a German Catholic priest, theologian, and church historian. A former member of the Papal household, he was appointed as a Prelate of Honour of His Holiness in 2006 and an Apostolic Protonotar in 2012 by Pope Benedict XVI. Imkamp serves as a consultant for the Congregation for the Causes of Saints and the Congregation for Divine Worship and the Discipline of the Sacraments and is a member of the Pontifical Academy of Theology, The German Association of the Holy Land, and the European Academy of Sciences and Arts. He is a knight of the Order of the Holy Sepulchre, the Sovereign Military Order of Malta, and the Order of Parfaite Amitié.

== Early life and education ==
Imkamp was born on 27 September 1951 in Kaldenkirchen, Germany. His family owned a tobacco factory and a coffee roaster. With the help of Bishop Klaus Hemmerle, he enrolled at the Pontifical Gregorian University in Rome where he studied theology and philosophy. He also spent two semesters at the Collegium Canisianum in Innsbruck.

== Ecclesiastical career ==
Imkamp was ordained as a Catholic priest in the Diocese of Aachen in 1976. He went back to the Pontifical Gregorian University in 1982 for a doctorate in theology, focusing on dogma and the historical work on the church by Pope Innocent III. He worked as a research associate at the Department of Modern and Medieval Church History at the University of Augsburg.

From 1988 until 2017 he served as the pilgrimage director of the Church of St. Maria Vesperbild in the Augsburg Western Woods Nature Park. He retired from this position on 24 July 2017. Since retiring Imkmap resides in Saint Emmeram's Abbey, where he serves as the director of the court library for the House of Thurn and Taxis and is a board member of the Franz Marie Christinen Foundation. He also serves as a personal confessor to Gloria, Princess of Thurn and Taxis at Saint Emmeram's Abbey.

Since 1983 Imkamp has served as a consultant in the Congregation for the Causes of Saints. He was confirmed by Pope Benedict XVI in 2008 and by Pope Francis in 2013. In 1987, he was appointed a Commander of the Order of the Holy Sepulchre by Cardinal Maximilien de Furstenberg, and was invested on 17 October 1987 by Bishop Franz Hengsbach. In 2006, he was appointed as a Knight of the Order of Parfaite Amitié by Albert, 12th Prince of Thurn and Taxis and as a Prelate of Honour of His Holiness by Benedict XVI. In 2008, he was invested as knight and an honorary chaplain of the Sovereign Military Order of Malta.

In 2009, he was appointed as a consultant to the Congregation for Divine Worship and the Discipline of the Sacraments by Pope Benedict XVI. In 2012 the pope made him an Apostolic Protonotar. In 2003 he became a corresponding member of the Pontifical Academy of Theology in Rome and, in 2013, became a full member of the Academy. He is a member of the supervisory board of the Sankt Ulrich Verlag media group of Augsburg, and works as a church historian in Bavaria. He is also a member of The German Association of the Holy Land and the European Academy of Sciences and Arts.

== Ideological views ==
A conservative, Imkamp is a staunch opponent of the ordination of women. He also criticized German president Christian Wulff for his welcome speech to Pope Benedict XVI, which referenced the president's divorce. Imkamp protested affirming divorced Catholics and reiterated that divorce is a reason to be barred from receiving the Eucharist. Imkamp has accused the Catholic Church in Germany of not being loyal to the Vatican, stating that the church would become a "pathogen with high infection potential" if it did not submit to the Vatican. He also accused church dignitaries of "clerical correctness", which he called a "piglet affair with political correctness".

In an interview with the German newspaper Mittelschwäbische Nachrichten, Imkamp criticized leaders of the Catholic Church in Germany for campaigning for the human rights of non-Christians and LGBTQ people in the political discussions about refugees. He accused Heiner Koch, the Archbishop of Berlin, of providing more protection for homosexual people than Christian refugees and blamed the focus on LGBTQ people on political lobbying.

In 2014 during a discussion with leaders of the Christian Social Union in Bavaria, Imkamp warned against a "socialist persecution of Christianity" and referred to politicians of the Social Democratic Party of Germany as "socialists from Germany".
