= Prince Ludwig Philipp of Thurn and Taxis =

German prince (1901–1932)

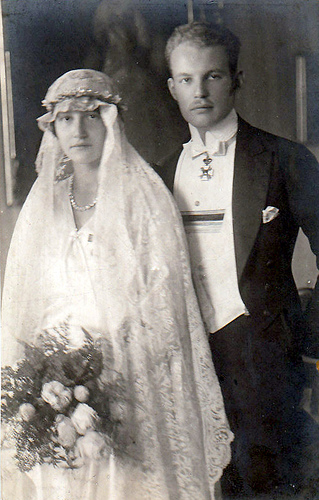
- Ludwig Philipp with his wife, Princess Elisabeth, on their wedding day in 1922
- Born: 2 February 1901; Regensburg, Kingdom of Bavaria
- Died: 22 April 1933 (aged 32); Schloss Niederaichbach, Niederaichbach, Bavaria, Germany
- Burial: St. Emmeram's Abbey, Regensburg
- Spouse: Princess Elisabeth of Luxembourg (m. 1922)
- Issue Detail: Prince Anselm; Iniga, Princess Eberhard of Urach
Names
- German: Ludwig Philipp Maria Friedrich Joseph Maximilian Antonius Ignatius Lamoral
- House: Thurn and Taxis
- Father: Albert, 8th Prince of Thurn and Taxis
- Mother: Archduchess Margarethe Klementine of Austria

Prince Ludwig Philipp Maria Friedrich Joseph Maximilian Antonius Ignatius Lamoral of Thurn and Taxis (full German name: Ludwig Philipp Maria Friedrich Joseph Maximilian Antonius Ignatius Lamoral, Prinz von Thurn und Taxis; also known in French as Louis Philippe) (2 February 1901, Regensburg, Kingdom of Bavaria – 22 April 1933, Schloss Niederaichbach, Niederaichbach, Bavaria, Germany) was a member of the House of Thurn and Taxis and a Prince of Thurn and Taxis by birth.

He died at the age of 32 in a car accident at Schloss Niederaichbach in 1933.

== Family ==
Prince Louis Philippe was the fourth child of Albert I, Prince of Thurn and Taxis, and his wife, Archduchess Margarethe Klementine of Austria.

== Marriage and issue ==
Ludwig Philipp married Princess Elisabeth of Luxembourg, the fifth child of William IV, Grand Duke of Luxembourg and Infanta Marie Anne of Portugal, on 14 November 1922 at Schloss Hohenburg in Bavaria, Germany.

Ludwig Philipp and Elisabeth had two children:

- Prince Anselm Albert Ludwig Maria Lamoral of Thurn and Taxis (14 April 1924 – 25 February 1944), reported killed in action during the Second World War.
- Princess Iniga Anna Margarete Wilhelmine Luise of Thurn and Taxis (25 August 1925 – 17 September 2008); she married Prince Eberhard of Urach on 18 May 1948 and had issue, including Prince Inigo of Urach.

Ludwig Philipp studied law at the Julius-Maximilians-Universität Würzburg and was a member of the Catholic student fraternity KDStV Cheruscia Würzburg (Cartellverband).

== Ancestry ==
Ancestors of Prince Ludwig Philipp of Thurn and Taxis

8. Maximilian Karl, 6th Prince of Thurn and Taxis
4. Maximilian Anton Lamoral, Hereditary Prince of Thurn and Taxis
9. Baroness Wilhelmine of Dörnberg
2. Albert, 8th Prince of Thurn and Taxis
10. Duke Maximilian Joseph in Bavaria
5. Duchess Helene in Bavaria
11. Princess Ludovika of Bavaria
1. Prince Ludwig Philipp of Thurn and Taxis
12. Archduke Joseph, Palatine of Hungary
6. Archduke Joseph Karl, Palatine of Hungary
13. Duchess Maria Dorothea of Württemberg
3. Archduchess Margarethe Klementine of Austria
14. Prince August of Saxe-Coburg and Gotha
7. Princess Clotilde of Saxe-Coburg and Gotha
15. Princess Clémentine of Orléans
