= Biskupice (Svitavy District) =

- Municipality
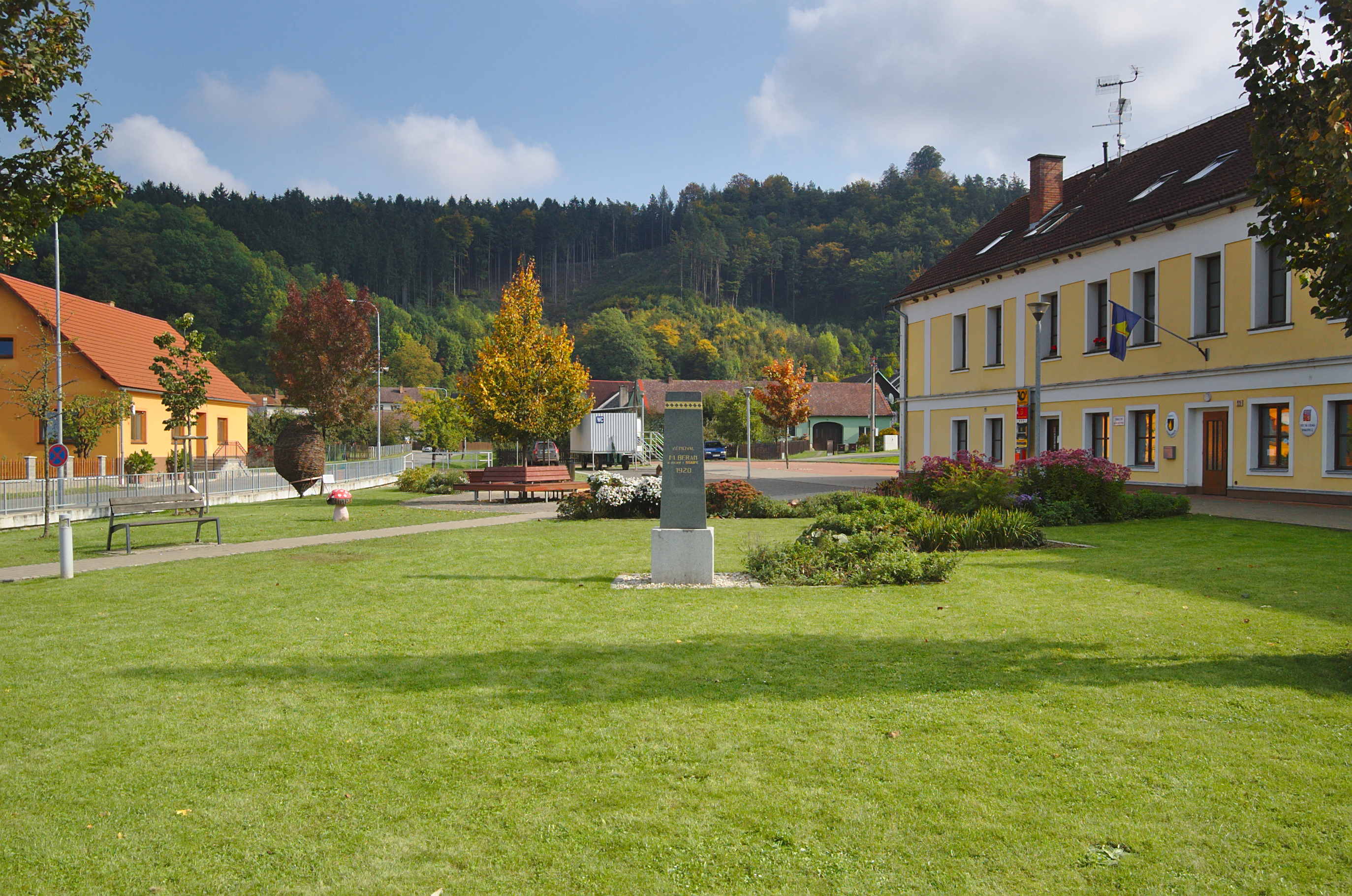
- Centre of Biskupice

- Flag Coat of arms

- Location in the Czech Republic
- Coordinates: 49°38′51″N 16°45′29″E
- Country: Czech Republic
- Region: Pardubice
- District: Svitavy
- First mentioned: 1262

Area
  - Total: 11.09 km^{2} (4.28 sq mi)
- Elevation: 352 m (1,155 ft)

Population (2026-01-01)
  - Total: 476
  - Density: 42.9/km^{2} (111/sq mi)
- Time zone: UTC+1 (CET)
  - Summer (DST): UTC+2 (CEST)
- Postal code: 569 43
- Website: biskupice.eu

Biskupice (German: Biskupitz) is a municipality and village in Svitavy District in the Pardubice Region of the Czech Republic. It has about 500 inhabitants.

Biskupice lies approximately 25 kilometres (16 mi) south-east of Svitavy, 83 km (52 mi) south-east of Pardubice, and 175 km (109 mi) east of Prague.

== Administrative division ==
Biskupice consists of two municipal parts (in brackets population according to the 2021 census):

- Biskupice (432)
- Zálesí (38)

== Demographics ==
Historical population
Year	Pop.	±%
1869	898	—
1880	913	+1.7%
1890	861	−5.7%
1900	774	−10.1%
1910	822	+6.2%
1921	775	−5.7%
1930	749	−3.4%
1950	580	−22.6%
1961	606	+4.5%
1970	631	+4.1%
1980	558	−11.6%
1991	464	−16.8%
2001	442	−4.7%
2011	431	−2.5%
2021	470	+9.0%
Source: Censuses

== Notable people ==
- Princess Eulalia of Thurn and Taxis (1908–1993), princess
