= Princess Eulalia of Thurn and Taxis =

Princess Eulalia
- Princess Philipp Ernst of Thurn and Taxis
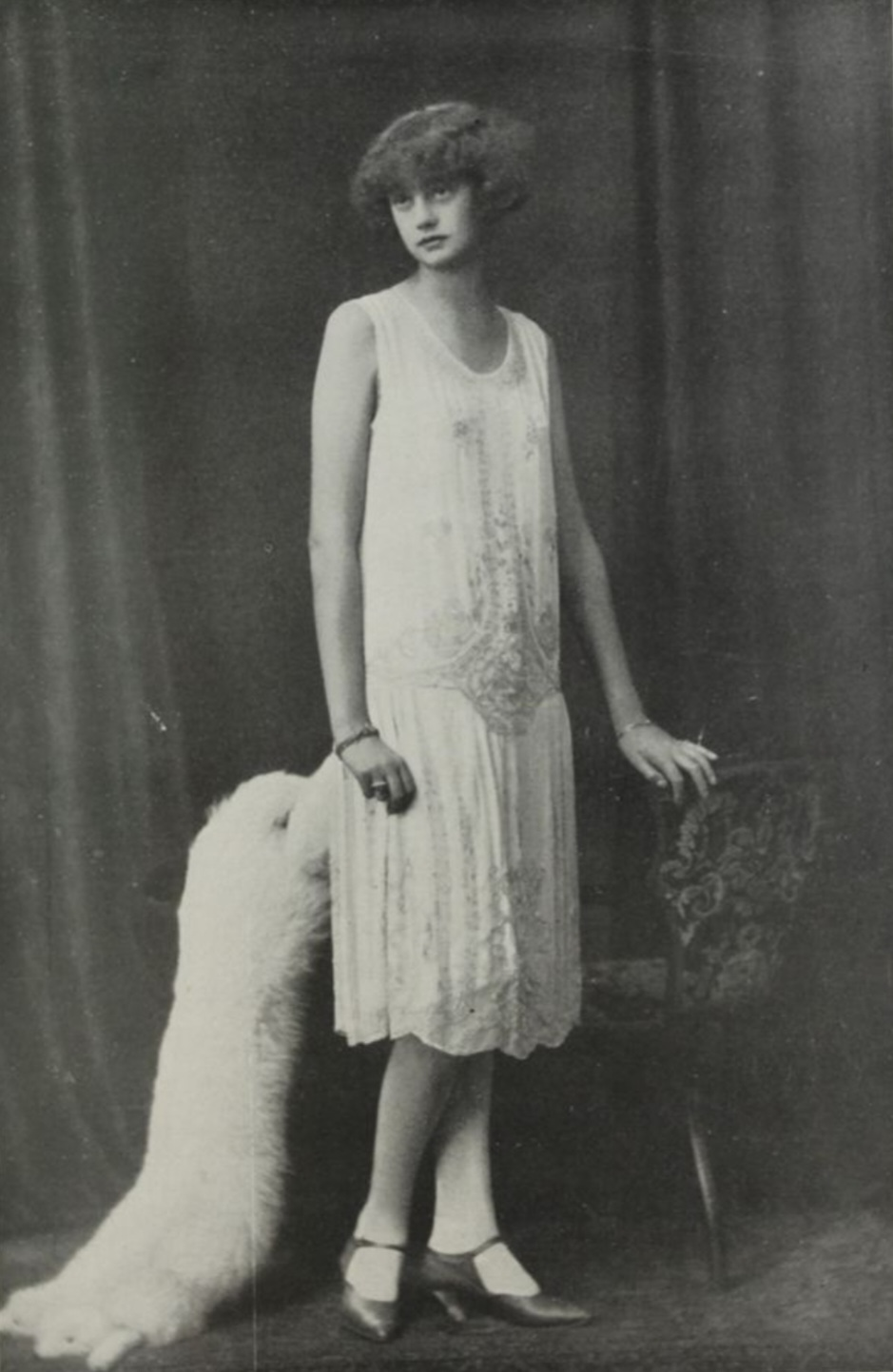
- Princess Eulalia in 1927
- Born: 21 December 1908; Schloss Biskupitz, Austro-Hungarian Empire
- Died: 30 December 1993 (aged 85); Hohenberg, Bavaria, Germany
- Spouse: Prince Philipp Ernst of Thurn and Taxis (m. 1929; died 1964)
- Issue: Prince Albrecht; Princess Marguerite; Princess Antonia
Names
- German: Eulalia Maria Antoine Eleonore Prinzessin von Thurn und Taxis
- House: House of Thurn and Taxis (by birth and marriage)
- Father: Prince Friedrich Lamoral of Thurn and Taxis
- Mother: Princess Eleonore de Ligne

Princess Eulalia Maria Antoine Eleonore of Thurn and Taxis, also known as Illa, (21 December 1908 – 30 December 1993) was the eldest child of Prince Friedrich Lamoral of Thurn and Taxis and his wife, Princess Eleonore de Ligne. She belonged to the Czech branch of the House of Thurn and Taxis.

== Family and early life ==
Princess Eulalia of Thurn and Taxis was born on 21 December 1908 to the Czech branch of the House of Thurn and Taxis. She was born and raised at the Schloss Biskupitz in Czechoslovakia. Though her official name was Eulalia, everyone in her family referred to her as "Illa".

== Marriage ==
=== Engagement to Prince Raphael ===
Princess Illa was engaged to Prince Raphael Rainer of Thurn and Taxis, a younger son of Albert, 8th Prince of Thurn and Taxis from 1928 to the following year. He belonged to the main branch of the House of Thurn and Taxis, as he was a descendant of Karl Anselm, 4th Prince of Thurn and Taxis. When it came time for the wedding in February 1929, Illa changed her mind and refused to marry him. Her timing meant that the bishop of Regensburg, as well as all of the guests, were all assembled and ready to attend the wedding before her announcement was made. She went to her fiancé's father and declared that her "heart belonged to" Prince Philipp Ernst of Thurn and Taxis, his youngest son, and that she found it "incompatible with the dictates of her conscience" to marry her fiancé. Albert subsequently consulted her paternal grandfather, who was the head of the Czech branch, and the two next summoned a family council. Both branches of the family involved said they commended Illa for her candor and courage, and also credited her with "the sincerest motivations springing from a deep religious conviction that it would be wrong to marry Prince Raphael when she really loved Prince Philippe". After informing Prince Albert, she apparently "burst into hysterical sobbing" and left soon after for her estates in Czechoslovakia. Her decision was not officially announced until the following day.

Illa had met the two brothers at about the same time, and "the wisdom of an alliance" between herself and Prince Raphael seemed clear. In the week leading up to the wedding however, Illa spent time with Philipp daily and grew feelings for him while staying at the Regensburg home of his and her fiancé's parents. A devout Catholic, Illa's "deep religious conviction" would not allow her to trap herself in a marriage with someone she did not love. Prince Raphael later married to another relative, his second cousin Princess Margarete of Thurn and Taxis; the couple were the parents of Prince Max Emanuel, the former heir presumptive to the Thurn and Taxis throne.

=== Marriage to Prince Philipp ===
On 7 May 1929, the engagement of Illa to Prince Philipp Ernst of Thurn and Taxis (7 May 1908 Schloss Prüfening - 23 July 1964 Schloss Hohenberg), her former fiancé's youngest brother, was formally announced. Their engagement had been tentatively approved until Philipp became of age, and he received his father's blessing before the betrothal was announced; the couple planned on a September wedding.

On 8 September 1929, Illa married Prince Philipp Ernst at the Schloss Taxis. They had three children:

- Prince Albrecht Friedrich Maria Lamorel Kilian of Thurn and Taxis (5 Jul 1930, Schloss Prüfening - 17 Jul 2021); married Baroness Alexandra von der Ropp (b. 31 October 1932), no issue. Their marriage is considered unequal by Thurn and Taxis family law.
- Princess Marguerite Eleonore Marie Franziska Antoine de Padua of Thurn and Taxis (b. 1 Dec 1933, Schloss Hohenberg - 29 December 2019, Hohenberg, Seeshaupt, Bayern)
- Princess Antonia Maria Margareta Theresia vom Kinde Jesu of Thurn and Taxis (b. 28 Jan 1936, Schloss Hohenberg)

== Later life ==
Illa's father was murdered on 10 May 1945 at Schloss Biskupitz.

Prince Philipp died on 23 July 1964 at the age of 56 at Schloss Hohenberg in Bavaria. Princess Illa died on 30 December 1993 at the age of 85.

== Ancestry ==
Ancestors of Princess Eulalia of Thurn and Taxis

8. Prince Friedrich Hannibal of Thurn and Taxis
4. Prince Lamoral Friedrich of Thurn and Taxis
9. Countess Aurora Batthyány de Német-Ujvár
2. Prince Friedrich Lamoral of Thurn and Taxis
10. Count Friedrich Schaffgotsch genannt Semperfrei von und zu Kynast und Greiffenstein
5. Countess Antonie Schaffgotsch genannt Semperfrei von und zu Kynast und Greiffenstein
11. Countess Teréz Pálffy de Erdőd
1. Princess Eulalia of Thurn and Taxis
12. Eugène, 8th Prince of Ligne
6. Prince Édouard of Ligne
13. Princess Jadwiga Lubomirska
3. Princess Éléonore of Ligne
14. Prince Carl of Solms-Braunfels
7. Princess Eulalie of Solms-Braunfels
15. Princess Sophie of Löwenstein-Wertheim-Rosenberg
