= Prince Max Emanuel of Thurn and Taxis =

German prince and Benedictine monk (1902–1994)

- Max Emanuel in 1914
- Born: 1 March 1902; Regensburg, Kingdom of Bavaria
- Died: 3 October 1994 (aged 92); Regensburg, Bavaria, Germany
- Burial: Neresheim Abbey
Names
- German: Max Emanuel Maria Siegfried Joseph Antonius Ignatius Lamoral
- House: Thurn and Taxis
- Father: Albert, 8th Prince of Thurn and Taxis
- Mother: Archduchess Margarethe Klementine of Austria

Father Emmeram of Thurn and Taxis OSB, until his profession Prince Max Emanuel Maria Siegfried Joseph Antonius Ignatius Lamoral of Thurn and Taxis (German: Pater Emmeram von Thurn und Taxis OSB; 1 March 1902, Regensburg, Kingdom of Bavaria – 3 October 1994, Regensburg, Bavaria, Germany) was a German Benedictine and member of the Princely House of Thurn and Taxis.

== Early life ==
Max Emanuel was the fifth eldest son (fourth, if counting only children who lived to adulthood) of Albert, 8th Prince of Thurn and Taxis, and his wife Archduchess Margarethe Klementine of Austria. He had six brothers and one sister. Max Emanuel's eldest brother was Franz Joseph, 9th Prince of Thurn and Taxis.

== Monastic life ==
Max Emanuel joined the Order of Saint Benedict in 1923 and became a member of Neresheim Abbey. For his religious name, he chose Emmeram after Saint Emmeram of Regensburg, patron saint of St. Emmeram Castle (previously a monastery), the residence of the princely family.

In 1951, Max Emanuel received the papal concession for the reestablishment of the former monastery Prüfening Abbey. Later in the 1950s, he established the Liturgiewissenschaftliche Institut Regensburg-Prüfening (German: Liturgic Scientific Institute Regensburg-Prüfening). For over 30 years of his life, Max Emanuel resided isolated at the family-owned St. Emmeram's Abbey in Regensburg. His desire to revive the monastic life was not fulfilled, however, so he opened Prüfening Abbey as a meeting place and home for the youth and poor. Max Emanuel died in 1994 and was buried at Neresheim Abbey.

== Ancestry ==
Ancestors of Prince Max Emanuel of Thurn and Taxis

8. Maximilian Karl, 6th Prince of Thurn and Taxis
4. Maximilian Anton Lamoral, Hereditary Prince of Thurn and Taxis
9. Baroness Wilhelmine of Dörnberg
2. Albert, 8th Prince of Thurn and Taxis
10. Maximilian Joseph, Duke in Bavaria
5. Duchess Helene in Bavaria
11. Princess Ludovika of Bavaria
1. Prince Max Emanuel of Thurn and Taxis
12. Archduke Joseph, Palatine of Hungary
6. Archduke Joseph Karl of Austria
13. Duchess Maria Dorothea of Württemberg
3. Archduchess Margarethe Klementine of Austria
14. Prince August of Saxe-Coburg and Gotha
7. Princess Clotilde of Saxe-Coburg and Gotha
15. Princess Clémentine of Orléans
