= Hurter =

Swiss noble family

The von Hurter family belonged to the Swiss nobility; in the eighteenth and nineteenth centuries three of them were known for their conversions to Roman Catholicism, their ecclesiastical careers in Austria and their theological writings.

== Friedrich Emmanuel von Hurter ==
=== Life ===
Friedrich Emmanuel von Hurter (born at Schaffhausen, 19 March 1787; died at Graz, 27 August 1865) was a Swiss Protestant cleric and historian who converted to Roman Catholicism.

From 1804 to 1806 he attended the University of Göttingen, and in 1808 was appointed to a country parish. The appearance in 1834 of the first volume of the life of Pope Innocent III, on which he had been working for twenty years, caused a profound sensation in both Catholic and Protestant circles, and was soon translated into French, English, Italian, and Spanish. Hurter was chosen in 1835 antistes of the clergy in the Canton of Schaffhausen, and later president of the school board, in which capacities he laboured with great zeal.

During many years his manifest sympathy and intimacy with the Catholic clergy, including the Archbishop of Freiburg and the papal nuncios to Switzerland, and his disinterested efforts to assist Catholics roused the antagonism of his colleagues who took the first pretext to let loose a storm of abuse against Hurter. As a result, he resigned his dignities in 1841, lived in retirement for three years, and in 1844 went to Rome, where on 16 June he made his profession of faith before Gregory XVI, his conversion being the signal for renewed attacks. In 1846 he was appointed imperial counsellor and historiographer at the Court of Vienna, and took up the task assigned him, the life of Emperor Ferdinand II, which, however, was withheld from the press by the court censors, but appeared later at Schaffhausen.

The Revolution of 1848 involved the loss of Hurter's position at Court, to which, however, he was restored in 1852. Till his death he laboured for the spread of Catholic religion, especially in connexion with the foreign mission field; he was also in close touch with the greatest scholars of the day. He was appointed by the pope a commander of the Order of St Gregory, and was a member of the academies of Rome, Munich, Brussels, and Assisi.

=== Works ===
In addition to his Leben Innocenz III (4 vols., Hamburg, 1834–42), Hurter was the author of Denkwürdigkeiten aus dem letzten Dezennium des 18. Jahrhunderts (1840); Geburt and Widergeburt (Schaffhausen, 1845–46), an autobiography; Geschichte Kaiser Ferdinands II. und seiner Eltern (Schaffhausen, 1850–65); Philipp Lang, Kammerdiener Kaiser Rudolfs II. (Schaffhausen, 1851); Beiträge zur Geschichte Wallensteins (Freiburg im Breisgau, 1855); Französische Feindseligkeiten gegen Oesterreich zur Zeit des dreizigjährigen Krieges (Vienna, 1859); Wallensteins vier letzte Lebensjahre (1862).

== Heinrich von Hurter ==
Heinrich von Hurter (born at Schaffhausen, 8 August 1825; died at Vienna, 30 May 1895) was the son of the preceding. He was ordained to the priesthood in 1851, and later appointed to a benefice at Vienna. Besides volumes of sermons, his writings include the principal biography of his father, Friedrich von Hurter und seine Zeit (2 vols., 1876), as well as Konzil und Unfehlbarkeit (1870) and Schönheit und Wahrheit der katholischen Kirche (9 vols., 1871–78).

== Hugo von Hurter ==
Hugo Adalbert Ferdinand von Hurter SJ, younger son of Friedrich (born at Schaffhausen, 11 January 1832; died 10 December 1914 at Innsbruck), was a Roman Catholic theologian.

He was ordained priest in 1855. From 1849 to 1856 he studied at the Collegium Germanicum in Rome, where he was made doctor of philosophy and theology. In 1857 he entered into the Society of Jesus, and after a brief residence in the college at Baumgarten was appointed in 1858 to the theological faculty of the University of Innsbruck as professor of dogmatic theology (professor emeritus after his retirement in 1903). Between 1887 and 1890 he was also Rector of the Jesuits' college in Innsbruck (the "Nicolaihaus", predecessor of the better-known Collegium Canisianum).

His chief works are:

- Theologiae dogmaticae compendium (3 vols., Innsbruck, 1876–78; 11th ed., 1903)
- Nomenclator literarius theologiae catholicae (3 vols., Innsbruck, 1871–86; 3rd ed., 5 vols., 1903)
- Medulla theologiae dogmaticae (2 vols., Innsbruck, 1870; 7th ed., 1902).

He also edited the collection Selecta opuscula SS. Patrum (54 vols., 1868–92).
