= Albert, 8th Prince of Thurn and Taxis =

Prince of Thurn and Taxis

Albert
- Prince of Thurn and Taxis
- Albert in 1916

Head of the House of Thurn and Taxis
- Period: 2 June 1885 – 22 January 1952
- Predecessor: Maximilian Maria
- Successor: Franz Joseph
- Born: 8 May 1867; Regensburg, Kingdom of Bavaria
- Died: 22 January 1952 (aged 84); Regensburg, Bavaria, West Germany
- Burial: Gruftkapelle, Saint Emmeram's Abbey, Regensburg
- Spouse: Archduchess Margarethe Klementine of Austria (m. 1890)
- Issue: Franz Joseph, 9th Prince of Thurn and Taxis; Prince Joseph Albert; Karl August, 10th Prince of Thurn and Taxis; Prince Ludwig Philipp; Prince Max Emanuel; Elisabeth Helene, Margravine of Meissen; Prince Raphael Rainer; Prince Philipp Ernst
Names
- German: Albert Maria Joseph Maximilian Lamoral
- House: Thurn and Taxis
- Father: Maximilian Anton Lamoral, Hereditary Prince of Thurn and Taxis
- Mother: Duchess Helene in Bavaria
- Religion: Roman Catholic

Albert Maria Joseph Maximilian Lamoral, 8th Prince of Thurn and Taxis (full German name: Albert Maria Joseph Maximilian Lamoral Fürst von Thurn und Taxis; 8 May 1867 – 22 January 1952) was the eighth Prince of Thurn and Taxis and Head of the Princely House of Thurn and Taxis from 2 June 1885 until his death on 22 January 1952.

== Youth, education and marriage ==
Albert was born at Regensburg, Germany, the youngest of four children of Maximilian Anton Lamoral, Hereditary Prince of Thurn and Taxis, and Duchess Helene in Bavaria. His father died when he was less than two months old, so on the death of his grandfather, Maximilian Karl, 6th Prince of Thurn and Taxis, his older brother Maximilian Maria, 7th Prince of Thurn and Taxis became Prince, under the guardianship of his mother who was regent until he should come of age. Prince Albert spent his childhood with his mother and three siblings in Prüfening Abbey, in Bismarckplatz, Regensburg. As was then typical for the aristocracy, he received a non-specific education, attending lectures in law, national economics and art history in Würzburg, Freiburg and Leipzig. On his brother's untimely death, aged 22, Prince Albert, then aged 18, inherited his brother's title, also under the guardianship of his mother as regent. At the time, his full title was Prince of Thurn and Taxis, Prince of Buchau und Prince of Krotoszyn, royal Count of Friedberg-Scheer, Count of Valle-Sassina, and of Marchtal, Neresheim etc., Hereditary general postmaster. In 1899 he acquired the additional Bavarian royal titles of Duke of Wörth und Donaustauf. He came of age on 8 May 1888 as full prince, head of the family of Thurn and Taxis.

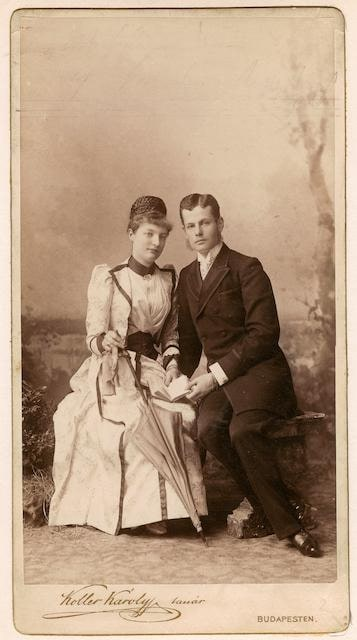
Archduchess Margarethe and her husband Albert

On 30 November 1889 he was made a knight of the Austrian Order of the Golden Fleece, along with ten other members of the European royal families, including the later father-in-law of his daughter, Frederick Augustus III of Saxony. Albert was the ninth member of the house of Thurn and Taxis to be honoured with this knighthood. At the time of his succession, Prince Albert had not yet married. On 15 July 1890 in Budapest, Hungary, Albert married Archduchess Margarethe Klementine of Austria (6 July 1870 – 2 May 1955), daughter of Archduke Joseph Karl of Austria. Albert purchased the 'Empress Eugenie Tiara' as a wedding present for Margarethe; the tiara, designed by Gabriel Lemmonier in 1853, was part of the French crown jewels and is now in the Louvre in Paris. They were married by the archbishop of Esztergom–Budapest, the Roman Catholic primate of Hungary, Cardinal János Simor in the chapel of Buda Castle. His marriage to Archduchess Margarethe lasted over 60 years, producing seven sons and a daughter.

== Two world wars, and thereafter ==
In the years before the outbreak of the First World War, the finances of royal household of Thurn and Taxis were exceptional, with the highest income Prince Albert would ever see. His events and numerous trips with his extended family were at this time more lavish than ever. In 1914, the yearbook of millionaires in Württemberg and Hohenzollern listed him as the richest man in Württemberg, with assets of 270 million Deutschmarks. By comparison, the king of Württemberg, Wilhelm II, had in the same year assets of only 36 million Marks. During the First World War, the civilian Prince Albert acted as a delegate and inspector for the Red Cross and medical services. On his journey to the front he retained his luxury and entourage, but he also supported the soldiers of his cavalry regiment, and he had the medical hospital of Ostheim built in the grounds of the sugar factory at Regensburg, where his wife Margarethe worked as a nurse.

After the war, during the German Revolution of 1918–1919 and the time of the Bavarian Soviet Republic there was unrest in Regensburg too, and rumours of a planned attack on the Prince's palace at Saint Emmeram. Nevertheless, the prince was given assurances by the mayor and the military administration, and in return he gave financial support to the construction of residential flats. When the situation reached its climax in 1919, the castle was barricaded and protected by soldiers from the Taxis regiment, armed with machine-guns. Finally, after the assassination of Kurt Eisner (who had organised the Socialist Revolution in Bavaria) in Munich in 1919, the rumoured attack on St. Emmeram came to nothing. To relieve the sufferings of the people in the winter months after the end of the war, Prince Albert founded in 1919 the princely emergency kitchen. This became a regular establishment from 1923, and remains to this day. In 1957, 70 students were fed by the kitchen, which today offers 400 meals to the needy, daily from Mondays to Fridays. After the second world war, prince Albert opened all the royal palaces in and around Regensburg to take in refugees. His childhood home, the former Benedictine monastery of Prüfening was, for a short time, home to the Philosophical and Theological University of Regensburg. As an aristocrat and Catholic, Albert was opposed to Nazism. Although his opposition was not active, he experienced his son Karl August's arrest in August 1944, and subsequent imprisonment in the Gestapo prison at Landshut until 1945. In 1949, Albert received the Albertus-Magnus-Medaille, named after Albertus Magnus, honouring scientists, artists, and patrons of the arts.

== Prince Albert and his wife Margarethe, artists, patrons of the art, and builders ==
Prince Albert played piano and organ, and sang in private life as a baritone. He busied himself around Regensburg as a builder and patron of the arts, and supported a wide range of cultural activities. He funded a 14-metre (46 ft) high altar reredos constructed between 1906 and 1912 in the church of St Joseph, Reinhausen; his coat of arms can be seen at the level of the central figure of St. Joseph.

When a bust of Richard Wagner was set up at the memorial, Walhalla to celebrate the composer's 100th birthday in 1913, Prince Albert personally asked Luitpold, Prince Regent of Bavaria if he might be permitted to fund the bust and its building-costs.

In partial compensation for the loss of monopoly over the postal service on the founding of the kingdom of Bavaria, the princes of Thurn and Taxis had been given the secularised monastery buildings of the imperial monastery of St. Emmeram in 1812. From 1816, the buildings were converted into a residence. During the incumbency of Maximilian Maria, 7th Prince of Thurn and Taxis, the architect Max Schultze had added (1883-1885) the south wing of the palace, 150m in length. During the regency of prince Albert, the south wing was, from 188, converted to a Rococo Revival style. In the years 1904 to 1908, Prince Albert had Schultze build a new, modernised royal stables in the north part of the new Hofmarschallamtes;at Waffnergasse. It had stalls and a three-storied coach house. When mechanised transport arrived in 1931, the royal stables were closed, and the contents of the harness-room and coach house were preserved in the royal stable museum of the princes of Thurn and Taxis.

Princess Margarethe, too, was benevolent, and had good taste in art; she not only made a name for herself as a painter and sculptor, but also helped out as a surgical nurse in the Regensburg hospitals.

== Later years and death ==
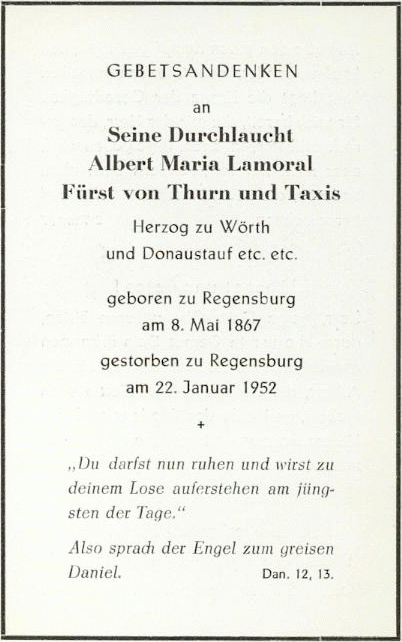
Announcement of the Prince's death in 1952

In 1913, prince Albert became the first recipient of the golden citizen's medal of Regensburg. In 1923 he received an honorary doctorate from the University of Innsbruck; the Tyroleans had been keen to distance themselves from "red Vienna" since 1922, and wanted to establish themselves independently under a Catholic monarch. Since Albert was married to a Habsburger, he fitted the bill, an impression reinforced by the award of this doctorate. Albert was an honorary member of the Catholic Studentenverbindung KDStV Vindelicia in Munich, and the KDStV Rupertia in Regensburg, part of the Union of Catholic German Student Fraternities. On 15 July 1950, Albert and Margarethe von Thurn und Taxis, accompanied by the royalty of Europe and the people of Regensburg, celebrated their diamond wedding anniversary. At a celebratory mass for the occasion, their granddaughter Maria Fernanda married prince Franz Josef von Hohenzollern. The city of Regensburg honoured Albert and Margarethe with honorary citizenship of the city.

On 22 January 1952 Albert died, at the age of 84, in the St. Emmeram palace at Regensburg. His wife Margarethe died three years later on 2 May 1955. They are buried together in the crypt chapel of palace of St. Emmeram, formerly St. Emmeram's Abbey. Today two streets in Regensburg are named after the couple.

== Children ==
- Franz Joseph, 9th Prince of Thurn and Taxis (21 December 1893 – 13 July 1971), married Princess Isabel Maria of Braganza, daughter of Miguel, Duke of Braganza. Miguel’s first wife had been Franz Joseph’s paternal aunt, Princess Elisabeth of Thurn and Taxis
- Prince Joseph Albert of Thurn and Taxis (4 November 1895 – 7 December 1895)
- Karl August, 10th Prince of Thurn and Taxis (23 July 1898 – 26 April 1982), married Princess Maria Anna of Braganza, daughter of Miguel, Duke of Braganza
- Prince Ludwig Philipp of Thurn and Taxis (2 February 1901 – 22 April 1933), married Princess Elisabeth of Luxembourg, daughter of Grand Duke William IV of Luxembourg
- Prince Max Emanuel of Thurn and Taxis (1 March 1902 – 3 October 1994)
- Princess Elisabeth Helene of Thurn and Taxis (15 December 1903 – 22 October 1976), married Friedrich Christian, Margrave of Meissen
- Prince Raphael Rainer of Thurn and Taxis (30 May 1906 – 8 June 1993), married Princess Margarete of Thurn and Taxis; father of Prince Max Emanuel of Thurn and Taxis, the former heir presumptive to Thurn and Taxis.
- Prince Philipp Ernst of Thurn and Taxis (7 May 1908 – 23 July 1964), married Princess Eulalia of Thurn and Taxis

== Honours ==
Styles of Albert, Prince of Thurn and Taxis
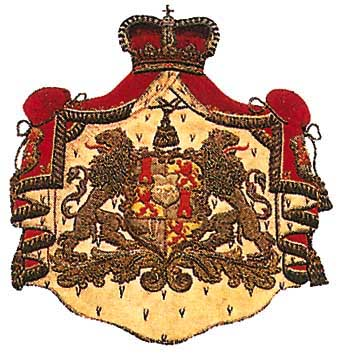
- Reference style: His Serene Highness
- Spoken style: Your Serene Highness

- Grand Master of the Order of Parfaite Amitié (House of Thurn and Taxis)
- Knight of the Order of the Golden Fleece, 1889 (Austria-Hungary)
- Grand Cross of the Order of Albert the Bear, 1888 (Duchy of Anhalt)
- Knight of the Order of St. Hubert, 1888 (Kingdom of Bavaria)
- Grand Cross of the Order of St. Alexander (Principality of Bulgaria)
- Grand Cross of the Saxe-Ernestine House Order (Ernestine duchies)
- Cross of Honour of the Princely House Order of Hohenzollern, 1st Class (House of Hohenzollern-Sigmaringen)
- Grand Cross of the House Order of the Wendish Crown (Mecklenburg)
- Knight of the Order of St. Januarius (House of Bourbon-Two Sicilies)
- In 1923 Albert received an honorary doctorate of philosophy from the University of Innsbruck.

== Ancestry ==
Ancestors of Albert, 8th Prince of Thurn and Taxis

8. Karl Alexander, 5th Prince of Thurn and Taxis
4. Maximilian Karl, 6th Prince of Thurn and Taxis
9. Duchess Therese of Mecklenburg-Strelitz
2. Maximilian Anton, Hereditary Prince of Thurn and Taxis
10. Ernst, Baron of Dörnberg
5. Baroness Wilhelmine of Dörnberg
11. Baroness Wilhelmine Henriette Maximiliane of Glauburg
1. Albert, 8th Prince of Thurn and Taxis
12. Duke Pius August in Bavaria
6. Duke Maximilian Joseph in Bavaria
13. Princess Amélie Louise of Arenberg
3. Duchess Helene in Bavaria
14. Maximilian I Joseph of Bavaria
7. Princess Ludovika of Bavaria
15. Princess Caroline of Baden

== Sources ==
- Behringer, Wolfgang (1990). Thurn und Taxis, Die Geschichte ihrer Post und ihrer Unternehmen. Munich, Zürich. ISBN 3-492-03336-9.
- Dallmeier, Martin; Schad, Martha (1996). Das Fürstliche Haus Thurn und Taxis, 300 Jahre Geschichte in Bildern. Regensburg: Verlag Friedrich Pustet. ISBN 3-7917-1492-9.
- Fiederer, Fabian (2017). "... an allen alten Traditionen festhalten". Lebenswelt und Selbstverständnis des Hochadels am Beispiel des Fürstenhauses Thurn und Taxis in der Zeit Fürst Albert I. (1888–1952), in "Thurn und Taxis Studien", new series, volume 5. Regensburg: Verlag Friedrich Pustet. ISBN 978-3-7917-2795-0.
- Buchenau, Klaus (2023). From Grand Estates to Grand Corruption: The battle over the possessions of Prince Albert of Thurn and Taxis in interwar Yugoslavia. Brill.

Albert, 8th Prince of Thurn and Taxis House of Thurn and Taxis Cadet branch of the House of Tassis Born: 8 May 1867 Died: 22 January 1952
German nobility
Preceded by Maximilian Maria	Prince of Thurn and Taxis; 2 June 1885 – 22 January 1952	Succeeded by Franz Joseph
