= Erminold =

Saint Erminold
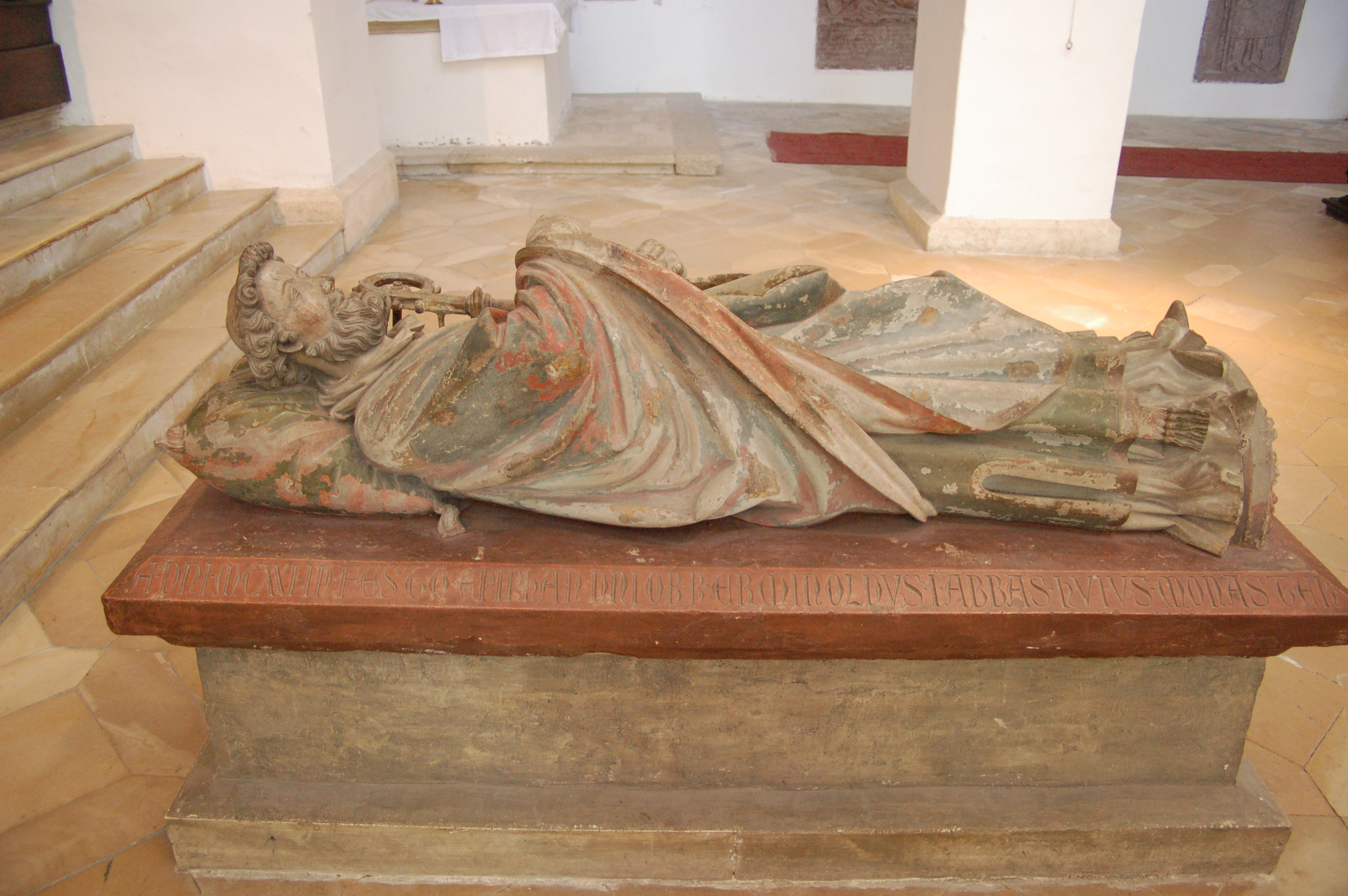
- The tomb of St. Erminold
- Born: Germany
- Died: 7 January 1121; Prüfening Abbey near Regensburg, Germany
- Venerated in: Roman Catholic Church
- Major shrine: St. George Church Prüfening Abbey, Regensburg, Germany
- Feast: 6 January

Erminold was a Benedictine abbot. He was given to Hirschau Monastery, in Würzburg, Germany, as a small child. In 1110, he became the abbot of Lorsch, resigning and returning to Hirschau when his election was disputed. In 1117, Erminold became abbot of Prüfening. There he was assaulted by a lay brother and slain on 7 January 1121. The means of the murder was the use of a piece of timber, and the motive was the Abbot's excessive strictness.
