= Christa von Thurn und Taxis =

Christa
- Princess Max Emanuel of Thurn and Taxis
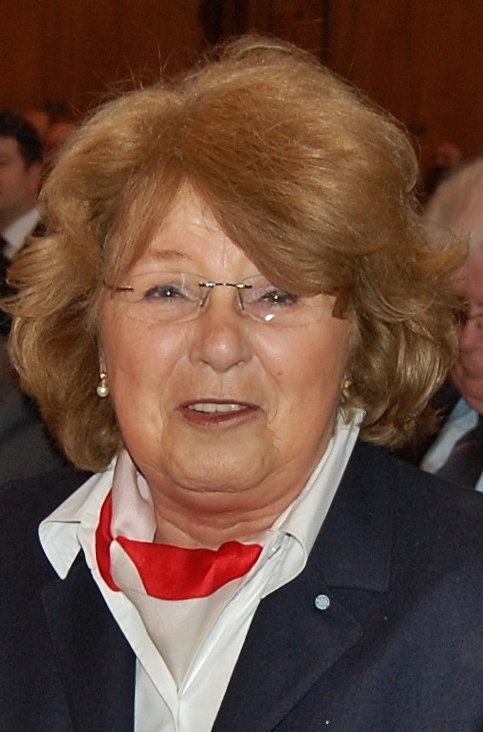
- Christa Prinzessin von Thurn und Taxis on 17 February 2013 (the 150th anniversary of the Red Cross)
- Born: 14 December 1941 (age 84); Heidenheim an der Brenz, Baden-Württemberg, Germany
- Spouse: Prince Max Emanuel of Thurn and Taxis (m. 1973)
- Issue: Hubertus Raphael; Philipp Gabriel
Names
- German: Christa Ingeborg
- House: Thurn and Taxis (by marriage)
- Father: Erich Heinle
- Mother: Ingeborg Wurzner

Christa Ingeborg Prinzessin von Thurn und Taxis (née Heinle; born 14 December 1941) is the current president of the Bavarian Red Cross (BRK) and a member of the Princely House of Thurn and Taxis by marriage.

== Marriage and issue ==
Christa Heinle married Prince Max Emanuel of Thurn and Taxis, only child of Prince Raphael Rainer of Thurn and Taxis and his wife Princess Margarete of Thurn and Taxis, civilly on 14 March 1973 in Schwangau, Bavaria, Germany, and religiously on 15 March 1973 at Schloss Bullachberg in Bavaria. They had two sons: Prince Hubertus of Thurn and Taxis (born 22 June 1973, married Marion Friedrich in 2011, with issue) and Prince Philipp of Thurn and Taxis (born 19 April 1975, married Alessandra Caspari in 2019).

== Functionary and honorary positions ==
Beginning in 1985, Christa was the Bavarian Red Cross (BRK) vice chairman for the district of Ostallgäu, and from 1989, for the region of Swabia. Christa served in these positions until 2005. Since 1989, she has been a member of the BRK-Land Board and the Committee for Social Services and since 1994, the Federal Committee for Welfare and Social Work in BRK. From 1993 to 2001, Christa was a member BRK Committee for Readiness and in 1995 she was a founding member of the Academy of the German Red Cross.

From 1997 to 2000, she was a senator in the Landtag of Bavaria. In November 1999, Christa began serving as Vice President of BRK. On 8 November 2003, she became the first woman to be elected President of the Bavarian Red Cross; she had already led the organization for the past five months after the previous president scaled down his duties due to health problems. In the same year, she was also member of the Council Pen (Stiftsratsvorsitzende Jutta Lowag) of the women's pen on Luitpoldpark in Munich.
