= Archduchess Margarethe Klementine of Austria =

Archduchess Margarethe Klementine
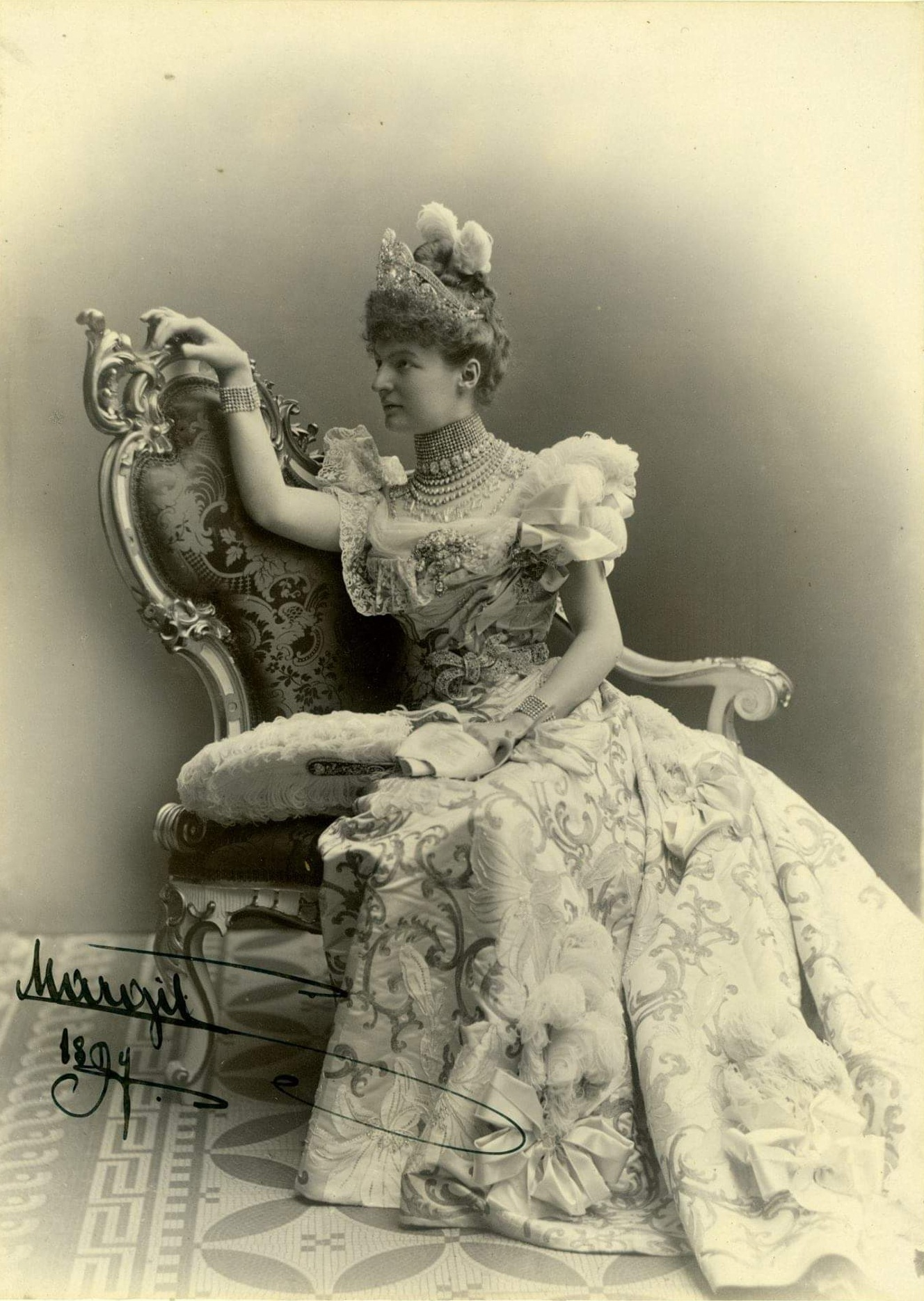
- Margarethe Klementine, c. 1894

Princess consort of Thurn and Taxis
- Tenure: 15 July 1890 – 22 January 1952
- Born: 6 July 1870; Alcsút, Austria-Hungary
- Died: 2 May 1955 (aged 84); Regensburg, Bavaria, Germany
- Burial: Gruftkapelle, Saint Emmeram's Abbey, Regensburg
- Spouse: Albert, 8th Prince of Thurn and Taxis (m. 1890; died 1952)
- Issue Detail: Prince Franz Joseph; Prince Joseph Albert; Prince Karl August; Prince Ludwig Philipp; Prince Max Emanuel; Princess Elisabeth Helene; Prince Raphael Rainer; Prince Philipp Ernst
Names
- German: Margarethe Klementine Maria von Habsburg-Lothringen; Hungarian: Habsburg–Lotaringiai Margit Klementina Mária
- House: Habsburg-Lorraine
- Father: Archduke Joseph Karl, Palatine of Hungary
- Mother: Princess Clotilde of Saxe-Coburg and Gotha

Archduchess Margarethe Klementine of Austria (6 July 1870 – 2 May 1955) was a member of the Hungarian line of the House of Habsburg-Lorraine.

== Early life ==
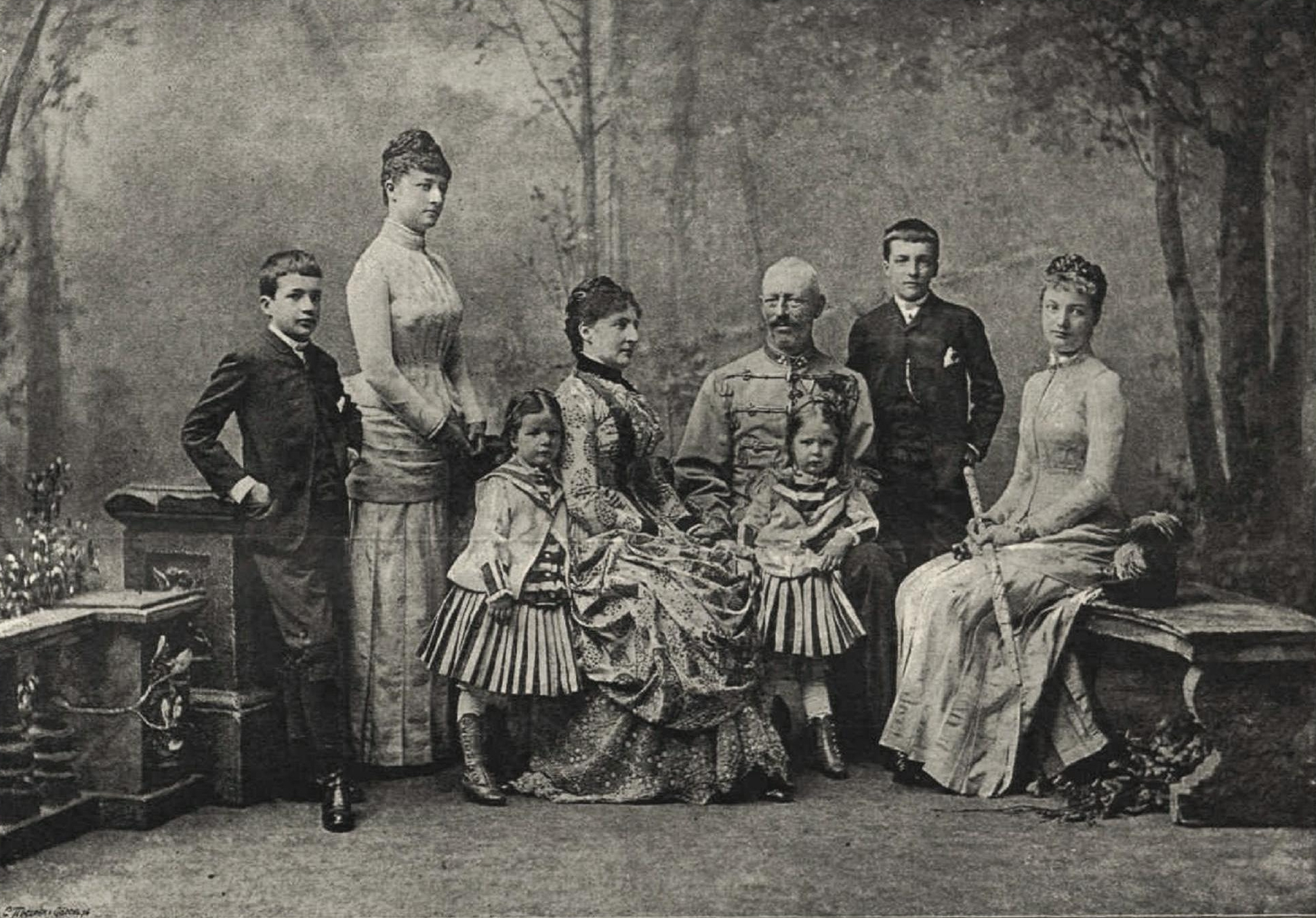
Margarethe Klementine with her family, circa 1887

Archduchess Margarethe Klementine was born on 6 July 1870 at her family's country estate in Alcsút, Austria-Hungary. She was the third-eldest daughter and child of Archduke Joseph Karl of Austria, the Palatine of Hungary, and Princess Clotilde of Saxe-Coburg and Gotha. Within her close family circle and domestic environment, she was known by the childhood pet name "Margit".

Raised within the Hungarian line of the House of Habsburg-Lorraine, Margarethe Klementine spent her formative years at Alcsút and was educated privately at home by tutors, a standard practice for noble daughters of the imperial dynasty during the late nineteenth century. Her early upbringing blended the German princely traditions introduced by her mother's Coburg background with the aristocratic lifestyle of the Hungarian domains. She maintained close personal relationships with her siblings, including her brother Archduke Joseph August and her sister Archduchess Maria Dorothea, until her marriage relocated her permanently to Germany.

== Marriage and issue ==
On 15 July 1890, Archduchess Margarethe Klementine married Albert, 8th Prince of Thurn and Taxis in Budapest, Austria-Hungary. He was the younger son of Maximilian Anton Lamoral, Hereditary Prince of Thurn and Taxis and Duchess Helene in Bavaria.

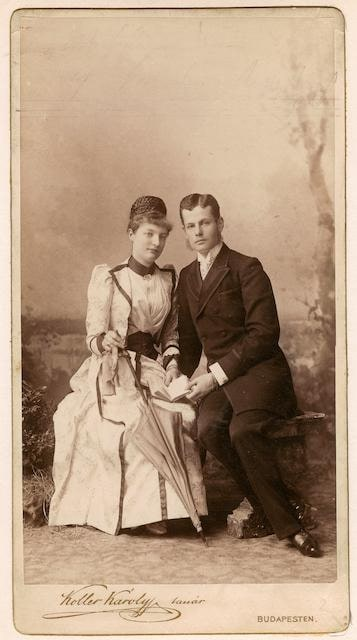
Margarethe Klementine with her husband Albert, 1889.

Styles of Archduchess Margarethe Klementine of Austria
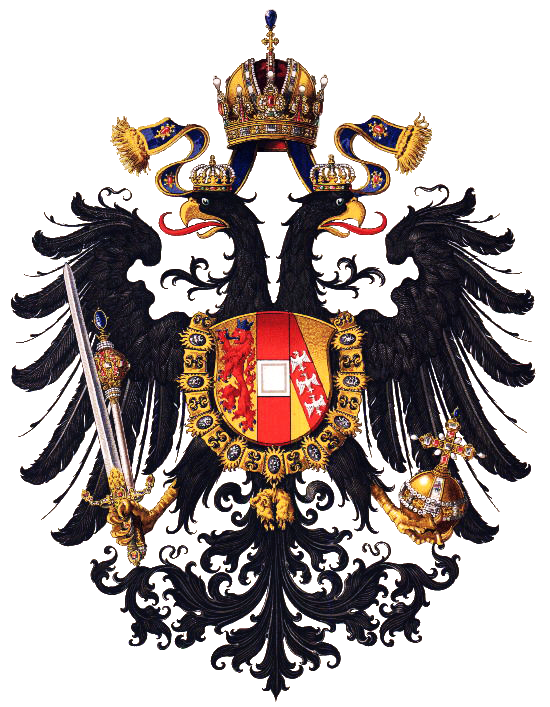
- Reference style: Her Imperial and Royal Highness
- Spoken style: Your Imperial and Royal Highness

The marriage produced eight children:

- Franz Joseph, 9th Prince of Thurn and Taxis (1893–1971), married Princess Isabel Maria of Braganza and had issue
- Prince Joseph Albert of Thurn and Taxis (1895–1895).
- Karl August, 10th Prince of Thurn and Taxis (1898–1982), married Princess Maria Anna of Braganza and had issue.
- Prince Ludwig Philipp of Thurn and Taxis (1901–1933), married Princess Elisabeth of Luxembourg and had issue.
- Prince Max Emanuel of Thurn and Taxis (1902–1994), entered the Benedictine Order and lived as a monk under the name Father Emmeram.
- Princess Elisabeth Helene of Thurn and Taxis (1903–1976), married Friedrich Christian, Margrave of Meissen and had issue.
- Prince Raphael Rainer of Thurn and Taxis (1906–1993), married Princess Margarete of Thurn and Taxis and had issue, including Prince Max Emanuel of Thurn and Taxis (b. 1935)
- Prince Philipp Ernst of Thurn and Taxis (1908–1964), married Princess Eulalia of Thurn and Taxis and had issue.

In July 1950, Margarethe Klementine and Prince Albert celebrated their diamond wedding anniversary, an event marked by public celebrations across Regensburg. Following her husband's death in January 1952, she spent her final years in relative retirement. Margarethe Klementine died on 2 May 1955 at the age of 84 in Regensburg, Bavaria. She was interred in the family vault at the Gruftkapelle within Saint Emmeram's Abbey.

== Cultural pursuits and legacy ==
Beyond her dynastic obligations, Margarethe Klementine was recognized for her significant contributions to the arts. Under the artistic pseudonym "Margit von Valsassina", she worked accomplishedly as a sculptor and medalist, designing several commemorative portrait reliefs and portrait medals during her tenure in Regensburg.

Furthermore, as the chatelaine of St. Emmeram Palace, she acted as a prominent cultural patron, hosting extensive artistic salons and musical receptions that effectively bridged the aristocratic networks of the Bavarian nobility with her paternal Habsburg kin in Austria and Hungary.

== Ancestry ==
Ancestors of Archduchess Margarethe Klementine of Austria

8. Leopold II, Holy Roman Emperor
4. Archduke Joseph, Palatine of Hungary
9. Infanta Maria Luisa of Spain
2. Archduke Joseph Karl, Palatine of Hungary
10. Duke Louis of Württemberg
5. Duchess Maria Dorothea of Württemberg
11. Princess Henriette of Nassau-Weilburg
1. Archduchess Margarethe Klementine of Austria
12. Prince Ferdinand of Saxe-Coburg and Gotha
6. Prince August of Saxe-Coburg and Gotha
13. Princess Maria Antonia Koháry of Csábrág and Szitnya
3. Princess Clotilde of Saxe-Coburg and Gotha
14. Louis Philippe I of France
7. Princess Clémentine of Orléans
15. Princess Maria Amalia of Naples and Sicily

Archduchess Margarethe Klementine of Austria House of Habsburg-Lorraine Cadet branch of the House of Lorraine Born: 6 July 1870 Died: 2 May 1952
German nobility
Preceded by Princess Mathilde Sophie of Oettingen-Spielberg	Princess consort of Thurn and Taxis; 15 July 1890 – 22 January 1952	Succeeded by Princess Isabel Maria of Portugal
