= Franz Joseph, 9th Prince of Thurn and Taxis =

Franz Joseph
- Prince of Thurn and Taxis
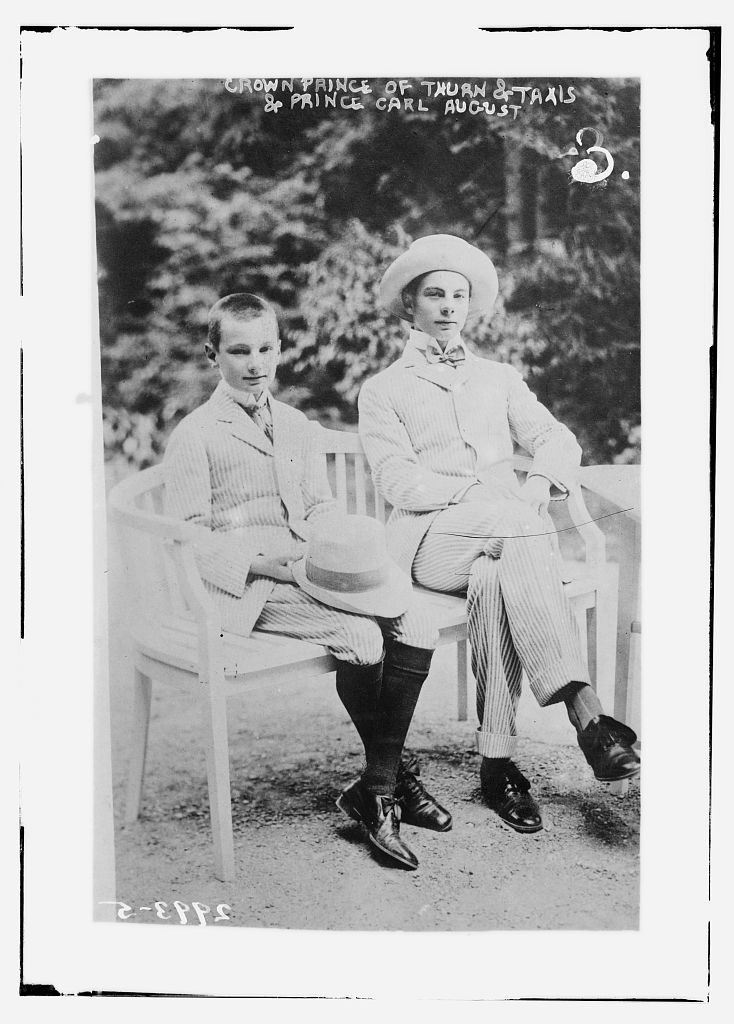
- Franz Joseph with his younger brother, Karl August, c. 1910

Head of the House of Thurn and Taxis
- Period: 22 January 1952 – 13 July 1971
- Predecessor: Albert I
- Successor: Karl August
- Born: 21 December 1893; Regensburg, Kingdom of Bavaria, German Empire
- Died: 13 July 1971 (aged 77); Regensburg, Bavaria, West Germany
- Burial: Gruftkapelle, Saint Emmeram's Abbey, Regensburg
- Spouse: Princess Isabel Maria of Braganza (m. 1920; died 1970)
- Issue: Prince Gabriel; Princess Michaela; Princess Helene; Princess Maria Theresia; Princess Maria Ferdinande
Names
- German: Franz Josef Maximilian Maria Antonius Ignatius Lamoral
- House: Thurn and Taxis
- Father: Albert, 8th Prince of Thurn and Taxis
- Mother: Archduchess Margarethe Klementine of Austria
- Religion: Roman Catholic

Franz Joseph Maximilian Maria Antonius Ignatius Lamoral, 9th Prince of Thurn and Taxis, full German name: Franz Josef Maximilian Maria Antonius Ignatius Lamoral Fürst von Thurn und Taxis (21 December 1893, Regensburg, Kingdom of Bavaria – 13 July 1971, Regensburg, Bavaria, Germany) was the ninth Prince of Thurn and Taxis and Head of the Princely House of Thurn and Taxis from 22 January 1952 until his death on 13 July 1971.

== Early life ==
Franz Joseph was the eldest son of Albert, 8th Prince of Thurn and Taxis and his wife Archduchess Margarethe Klementine of Austria.

His christening was attended by Franz Joseph I of Austria. Franz Joseph had six younger brothers and a sister. One of his brothers was Prince Max Emanuel of Thurn and Taxis (1902–1994), a member of the Order of Saint Benedict known as Pater Emmeram.

== Education and World War I service ==
Franz Joseph received a humanistic education by private teachers. Beginning in the winter semester of 1912, Franz Joseph studied at both the University of Strasbourg and University of Leipzig. Because of the outbreak of World War I, he could not complete his studies. On 6 August 1914, Franz Joseph joined the Prussian Elite Regiment Gardes du Corps.

During the war, he was promoted to lieutenant. After the war's end in January 1919, Franz Joseph returned to Regensburg.

== Marriage and family ==
Franz Joseph married Princess Isabel Maria of Braganza, daughter of Miguel, Duke of Braganza and his wife Princess Maria Theresa of Löwenstein-Wertheim-Rosenberg, on 23 November 1920 at Schloss Bronnbach, Bronnbach, Wertheim, Bavaria, Germany.

Franz Joseph and Isabel Maria had five children:

- Prince Gabriel of Thurn and Taxis (16 October 1922 – 17 December 1942)
- Princess Michaela of Thurn and Taxis (16 October 1922 – 17 October 1922)
- Princess Helene of Thurn and Taxis (27 May 1924 – 27 October 1991)
- Princess Maria Theresia of Thurn and Taxis (10 September 1925 – 27 April 1997)
- Princess Maria Ferdinande of Thurn and Taxis (19 December 1927 – 9 June 2018); married Prince Franz Josef of Hohenzollern on 15 July 1950, later divorced.

Together with his wife, Franz Joseph resided at Schloss Haus in Neueglofsheim (Upper Palatinate) where he managed the property and its interests. There, he also took an interest in hunting, history, and art. He later bequeathed Schloss Haus's large private library to the Prince Thurn und Taxis Hofbibliothek.

== World War II ==
At the age of 46, Franz Joseph served Nazi Germany in the Invasion of Poland in 1939. By the end of June 1940, he was serving in the Battle of France. Subsequently, Franz Joseph was a crew chief stationed in France for two and a half years until he was dismissed due to a decree from Adolf Hitler on the "inability of the German Defense nobility" retroactive to 31 March 1944 by Generalfeldmarschall Wilhelm Keitel of the Army.

Franz Joseph's son Gabriel was killed in action on 17 December 1942 in the Battle of Stalingrad.

== Later life ==
Franz Joseph resided for most of the year at Schloss Haus, but spent winters at Schloss Thurn und Taxis in Regensburg. In addition to managing the family estate, he dedicated himself increasingly to the preservation of the history of Regensburg and the former St. Emmeram's Abbey, the residence of the Princely House of Thurn and Taxis.

On 21 December 1963, Franz Joseph was made an Honorary Citizen of the City of Regensburg "in appreciation of the high contribution to the economic, social and cultural issues." He was also made an honorary member of the Roman Catholic student association K.D.St.V. Rupertia Regensburg.

Styles of Franz Joseph, Prince of Thurn and Taxis
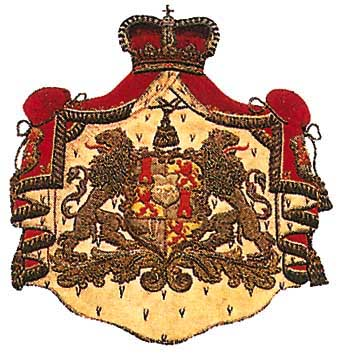
- Reference style: His Serene Highness
- Spoken style: Your Serene Highness

Franz Joseph survived his wife Isabel Maria, who died on 12 January 1970, about one and a half years before him. He died after a severe illness on 13 July 1971 and was interred in the burial chapel at St. Emmeram's Abbey.

In Regensburg, the Erbprinz-Franz-Joseph-Straße is named after him.

== Ancestry ==
Ancestors of Franz Joseph, 9th Prince of Thurn and Taxis

8. Maximilian Karl, Prince of Thurn and Taxis
4. Maximilian Anton, Hereditary Prince of Thurn and Taxis
9. Baroness Wilhelmine of Dörnberg
2. Albert I, Prince of Thurn and Taxis
10. Duke Maximilian Joseph in Bavaria
5. Duchess Helene in Bavaria
11. Princess Ludovika of Bavaria
1. Franz Joseph, Prince of Thurn and Taxis
12. Archduke Joseph, Palatine of Hungary
6. Archduke Joseph Karl, Palatine of Hungary
13. Duchess Maria Dorothea of Württemberg
3. Archduchess Margarethe Klementine of Austria
14. Prince August of Saxe-Coburg and Gotha
7. Princess Clotilde of Saxe-Coburg and Gotha
15. Princess Clémentine of Orléans

Franz Joseph, 9th Prince of Thurn and Taxis House of Thurn and Taxis Cadet branch of the House of Tassis Born: 21 December 1893 Died: 13 July 1971
German nobility
Preceded by Albert I	Prince of Thurn and Taxis; 22 January 1952 – 13 July 1971	Succeeded by Karl August
