= Collegium Canisianum =

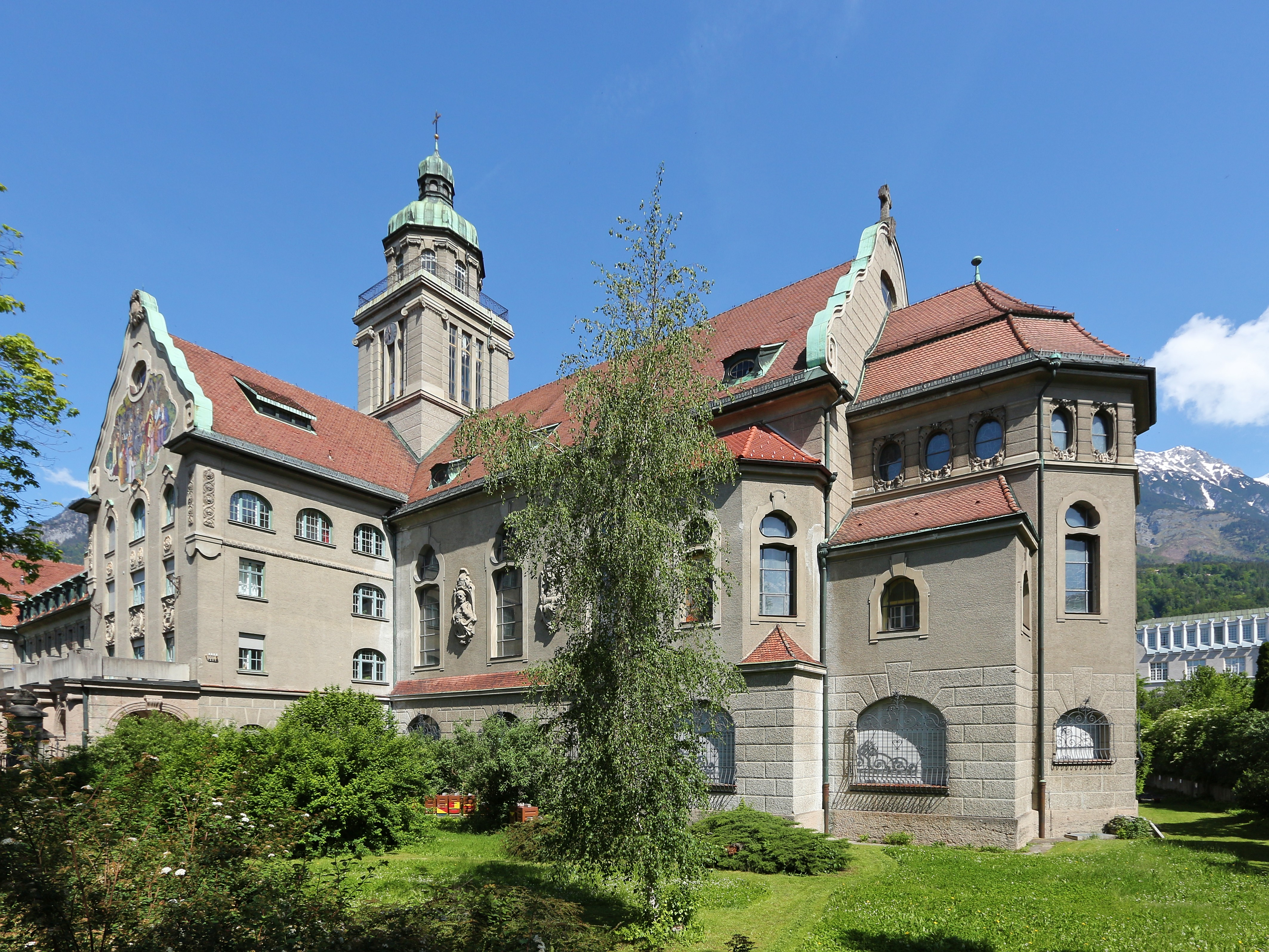
- Interactive map of the Collegium Canisianum area

General information
- Type: seminary
- Location: Innsbruck, Austria
- Coordinates: 47°16′28″N 11°23′58″E

Design and construction
- Designations: Denkmalgeschütztes Objekt

The Collegium Canisianum or simply Canisianum in Innsbruck, Austria, is an international school of theology for priests of the Catholic Church run by the Jesuits.

== History ==
The Canisianum is one of many Jesuit seminaries worldwide named after Saint Peter Canisius and was built in 1910–1911 under Rector, or Regens, Michael Hofmann, to replace the previous Nicolaihaus seminary, which had been outgrown.

During World War I it also accommodated from 1915 to 1919 the students of the Collegium Germanicum in Rome.

On 21 November 1938 it was shut down by the National Socialists. The theology Faculty relocated to Sitten, Switzerland until they were able to return to Innsbruck in October 1945. In 2007 the Canisianum changed from a seminary to an International School of Theology, for ordained priests pursuing advanced studies at the University of Innsbruck.

Renovations were completed on the 100 year old building in 2022.

== Notable alumni ==
- Blessed Vilmos Apor (1892–1945), bishop of the diocese of Győr, beatified in 1997
- Blessed Nykyta Budka (1877–1959), auxiliary bishop of Lviv (Lwów), beatified in 2001
- Petar Čule (1898–1985), bishop of Mostar-Duvno and apostolic administrator of Trebinje-Mrkan
- Josef Frings (1887–1978), Archbishop of Cologne, cardinal
- Blessed Clemens August Graf von Galen (1878–1946), bishop of Münster, cardinal, beatified 2005
- Wilhelm Imkamp (b. 1951), German Catholic prelate
- Blessed Andrew Ishchak (1887–1941), professor at the theological academy in Lwów, beatified in 2001
- Wasyl Kushnir (1893–1979), Ukrainian priest and political activist
- Myroslav Ivan Lubachivsky (1914–2000), Cardinal, archbishop of Lviv of the Ukrainian Catholic Church
- Konrad Graf von Preysing (1880–1950), bishop of Berlin, cardinal
- Paulus Rusch (1903–1986), bishop of Innsbruck
- Adam Stefan Sapieha (1867–1951), cardinal archbishop of Kraków, cardinal
- Joseph Slipyj (1892–1984), Metropolitan of the Ukrainian Catholic church, cardinal
- Reinhold Stecher (1921-2013), bishop of Innsbruck
- Blessed Clement Sheptytsky (1869–1951), Exarch of Russia and Siberia, Archimandrite of the Studite monks, beatified 2001
- Bruno Wechner (1908–1999), first bishop of Feldkirch
- Henry Joseph Grimmelsmann (1890–1972), first bishop of Evansville, Indiana and a principal author of The Holy Bible, New Testament, Challoner-Rheims Version, Confraternity of Christian Doctrine Revision

== See also ==
- List of Jesuit sites
