= Princess Elisabeth of Luxembourg (1901–1950) =

Luxembourgish princess

Princess Elisabeth
- Princess Ludwig Philipp of Thurn and Taxis
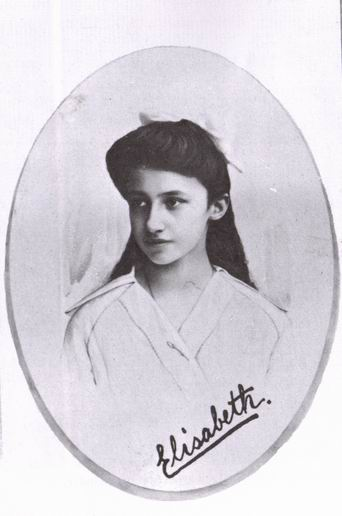
- Princess Elisabeth, c. 1915
- Born: 7 March 1901; Luxembourg, Grand Duchy of Luxembourg
- Died: 2 August 1950 (aged 49); Schloss Hohenburg, Hohenburg, Bavaria, Germany
- Burial: St. Emmeram's Abbey, Regensburg
- Spouse: Prince Ludwig Philipp of Thurn and Taxis (m. 1922; died 1933)
- Issue Detail: Prince Anselm; Iniga, Princess Eberhard of Urach
Names
- French: Elisabeth Marie Wilhelmine
- House: Nassau-Weilburg
- Father: William IV, Grand Duke of Luxembourg
- Mother: Infanta Marie Anne of Portugal

Princess Elisabeth of Luxembourg (Elisabeth Marie Wilhelmine; 7 March 1901 – 2 August 1950) was the daughter of William IV, Grand Duke of Luxembourg, and Infanta Marie Anne of Portugal.

In 1922, she married Prince Ludwig Philipp of Thurn and Taxis.

== Family ==
Elisabeth was a member of the House of Nassau-Weilburg, a branch of the House of Nassau. She was the fifth daughter of William IV, Grand Duke of Luxembourg, and his consort, Infanta Marie Anne of Portugal. Through her mother, she was a granddaughter of the deposed King Miguel I of Portugal and Princess Adelaide of Löwenstein-Wertheim-Rosenberg.

Two of Elisabeth's elder sisters reigned as the sovereign Grand Duchess of Luxembourg: Marie-Adélaïde, who abdicated in 1919, and Charlotte, who reigned until 1964. Her other siblings included Princesses Hilda, Antonia, and Sophie.

== Marriage and issue ==
On 14 November 1922, Elisabeth married Prince Ludwig Philipp of Thurn and Taxis at Hohenburg, Bavaria. Prince Ludwig Philipp was the fourth child of Albert, 8th Prince of Thurn and Taxis, and Archduchess Margarethe Klementine of Austria. This union integrated her into the princely German House of Thurn und Taxis.

The couple had two children and a lineage that extends to several generations:

- Prince Anselm Albert Ludwig Maria Lamoral of Thurn and Taxis (14 April 1924 – 25 February 1944). He never married and was killed in action during World War II at the age of 19.
- Princess Iniga of Thurn and Taxis (25 August 1925 – 17 September 2008). She married Prince Eberhard of Urach on 18 May 1948. Their marriage produced five children, including:
  - Prince Karl Anselm of Urach (born 1955)
  - Prince Wilhelm Albert of Urach (born 1957)
  - Prince Eberhard Friedrich of Urach (born 1962)
  - Princess Amelie of Urach (born 1961)
  - Princess Elisabeth of Urach (born 1966)

== Death ==
On 22 April 1933, Prince Ludwig Philipp of Thurn and Taxis died in a car accident near the family's estate in Niederaichbach at the age of 32.

Princess Elisabeth died on 2 August 1950, aged 49, at Schloss Niederaichbach. She was interred alongside her husband in the princely chapel of St. Emmeram's Abbey (Schloss St. Emmeram) in Regensburg, Bavaria.
