= Prince Max Emanuel of Thurn and Taxis (b. 1935) =

German prince (1935–2020)

Prince Max Emanuel
- Born: 7 September 1935; Schloss Bullachberg
- Died: 5 March 2020 (aged 84)
- Spouse: Anna Maria Gräfin von Pocci (m. 1969; div. 1970) Christa Heinle (m. 1973)
- Issue: Hubertus Raphael; Philipp Gabriel
Names
- Max Emanuel Maria Albert Paul Isabella Klemens Lamoral
- House: Thurn and Taxis
- Father: Prince Raphael Rainer of Thurn and Taxis
- Mother: Princess Margarete of Thurn and Taxis

Max Emanuel Prinz von Thurn und Taxis (7 September 1935 – 5 March 2020) was the heir presumptive to the nominal title of Fürst von Thurn und Taxis that is held, according to the traditional house law of the former German princely House of Thurn and Taxis, by his nephew Albert, 12th Prince of Thurn and Taxis. Max Emanuel was a member of the former German princely House of Thurn and Taxis, whose wealth derived from founding the German postal service and brewing.

== Marriages and issue ==
On 20 May 1969, at Schwangau, Max Emanuel entered into a civil marriage, deemed uncompliant with the family's traditional house law, with Anna Maria Gräfin von Pocci, a daughter of Count Konrad Albert von Pocci and his wife Anna Elisabeth Hartmann. They married in a religious ceremony two days later. A childless marriage, they divorced a year later, on 1 July 1970 at Kempten; the marriage was annulled on 17 October 1972 at Augsburg.

On 14 March 1973 at Schwangau, he entered into another uncompliant union, civilly marrying Christa Heinle, a daughter of Erich Heinle and his wife Ingeburg Wurzner. The following day, they had a religious ceremony.

He and Christa have two sons:

- Hubertus Raphael Franz Josef Ulrich Maria Lamoral Prinz von Thurn und Taxis (b. 22 June 1973), married (rel) at Waltenhofen on 27 August 2011 Marion Fischer, née Friedrich (b. 1971, Mannheim)
  - David Raphael Max Emanuel Philipp Albert Lamoral (b. 2011)
- Philipp Gabriel Franz Josef Magnus Maria Lamoral Prinz von Thurn und Taxis (b. 19 April 1975), married at Schwangau on 18 May 2019 Alessandra Caspari (b. 1984)

== Building plan tensions ==
Max Emanuel's plans in the late 1990s and early 2000s to develop real estate near historical sites in Bavaria caused tensions with historical societies and others in the local community. He already had a commercial presence in the area, as he ran a "sport and seminar" center which offered river rafting, mountain biking, paragliding, and golf.

In 1997, Max Emanuel planned to build a $22 million luxury hotel with 150 rooms, fine dining, a golf school and adjacent golf course, and a health spa on land directly in view of Neuschwanstein Castle, the famous site built by Ludwig II of Bavaria. These preparations were defeated however, after locals and a conservation society managed to get a local referendum held in 1997 to scrap the plans. Max Emanuel continued his plans four years later to build a hotel and golf course on the same site. People living nearby were upset that the view seen from the castle's grounds would be ruined by new construction meant for tourists; consequently the local council ruled that most of the land surrounding the castle was unusable for commercial development. Max Emanuel responded to these complaints by saying a luxury hotel would draw wealthy visitors to the village and help the local economy; restaurant, shop owners, and other members of the tourist industry tended to favor his plans, while village counselors, local farmers and others were opposed, believing that any commercial development would ruin the rural landscape and create too much noise. Those in favor of King Ludwig's legacy stated that the hotel would violate the romantic legacy the mad king left.

A bureaucratic mistake during initial plans four-year previously left one piece of land available for commercial development in 2001, a fact that Max Emanuel was able to take advantage of. With a seat on the council as a Christian Social Union member, he proceeded with plans for a scaled-down leisure complex of 50 rooms and a six-hole golf training course, which the Bavarian state parliament ruled to be legal. Critics complained that even these plans would impede the views of the castle, as it would be easy for further construction to continue building the site up. As a result of these new plans, efforts were quickly underway by various groups, such as the Bavarian Society for the Protection of Nature, to declare the castle and surrounding land a World Heritage Site.

Max Emanuel and his family stated that if the plans were not approved, they would be forced to sell Schloss Bullachberg (the property in the shadow of the castle) as well as a nearby ancestral castle that required restoration; many saw this announcement as a barely concealed threat: if their plans were rejected, these properties might be sold to another developer with even more unpleasant plans for the area.

Construction plans still remain in limbo today; in 2006, Porsche Automobil Holding SE acquired the property, intending to continue the project.

== Ancestry ==
Ancestors of Prince Max Emanuel of Thurn and Taxis (b. 1935)

16. Maximilian Karl, 6th Prince of Thurn and Taxis
8. Maximilian Anton Lamoral, Hereditary Prince of Thurn and Taxis
17. Baroness Wilhelmine von Dörnberg
4. Albert, 8th Prince of Thurn and Taxis
18. Duke Maximilian Joseph in Bavaria
9. Duchess Helene in Bavaria
19. Princess Ludovika of Bavaria
2. Prince Raphael Rainer of Thurn and Taxis
20. Archduke Joseph, Palatine of Hungary
10. Archduke Joseph Karl of Austria
21. Duchess Maria Dorothea of Württemberg
5. Archduchess Margarethe Klementine of Austria
22. Prince August of Saxe-Coburg and Gotha
11. Princess Clotilde of Saxe-Coburg and Gotha
23. Princess Clémentine of Orléans
1. Prince Max Emanuel of Thurn and Taxis
24. Maximilian Karl, 6th Prince of Thurn and Taxis (= 16)
12. Prince Theodor Georg of Thurn and Taxis
25. Baroness Wilhelmine von Dörnberg (= 17)
6. Prince Maximilian Theodor of Thurn und Taxis
26. Baron Karl von Seckendorff
13. Baroness Melanie von Seckendorff
27. Baroness Melanie Spiegel von und zu Peckelsheim
3. Princess Margarete of Thurn and Taxis
28. Klemens von Metternich
14. Prince Paul of Metternich-Winneburg
29. Countess Melania Zichy-Ferraris de Zich et Vásonykeö
7. Princess Pauline of Metternich-Winneburg
30. Felix, Count Zichy-Ferraris de Zich et Vásonykeö
15. Countess Melania Zichy-Ferraris de Zich et Vásonykeö
31. Countess Emilie von Reichenbach-Lessonitz
