= Princess Isabel Maria of Braganza =

Isabel Maria de Bragança
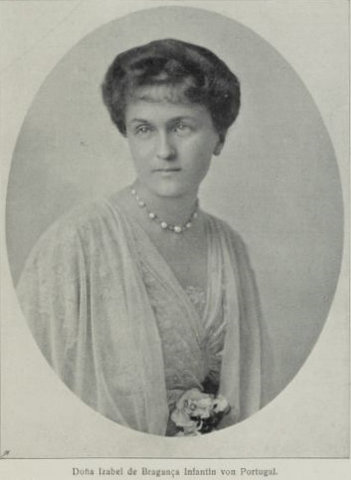
- Princess Isabel, 1916

Princess consort of Thurn and Taxis
- Tenure: 22 January 1952 – 12 January 1970
- Born: 19 November 1894; Kleinheubach, Kingdom of Bavaria
- Died: 12 January 1970 (aged 75); Regensburg, Bavaria, Germany
- Burial: Gruftkapelle, Saint Emmeram's Abbey, Regensburg
- Spouse: Franz Joseph, 9th Prince of Thurn and Taxis (m. 1920)
- Issue: Prince Gabriel; Princess Michaela; Princess Helene; Princess Maria Theresia; Princess Maria Ferdinande
Names
- Isabel Maria Alberta Josefa Micaela Gabriela Rafaela Francisca de Paula e de Assis Teresa Adelaide Eulália Sofia Carolina de Bragança
- House: Braganza; Thurn and Taxis
- Father: Miguel Januário, Duke of Braganza
- Mother: Princess Maria Theresa of Löwenstein

Princess Isabel Maria of Braganza (Isabel Maria Alberta Josefa Micaela Gabriela Rafaela Francisca de Paula e de Assis Teresa Adelaide Eulália Sofia Carolina; 19 November 1894, Kleinheubach, Kingdom of Bavaria – 12 January 1970, Regensburg, Bavaria, Germany) was a member of the House of Braganza. Through her marriage to Franz Joseph, 9th Prince of Thurn and Taxis, Isabel Maria was also a member of the House of Thurn and Taxis and Princess consort of Thurn and Taxis.

== Family ==
Isabel Maria was born in Kleinheubach, Bavaria, Germany, the eldest daughter of the Miguelist pretender to the Portuguese throne Miguel Januário, Duke of Braganza and his second wife Princess Maria Theresa of Löwenstein. Isabel Maria's father was the head of the non reigning branch of the Portuguese Royal House that had been exiled from Portugal. The exile was the result of the Portuguese law of banishment of 1834 and the constitution of 1838 which was brought about because his grandfather Miguel I of Portugal had in 1828 usurped the throne of Portugal from Queen Maria II. Her grandfather reigned as king until 1834 when Maria II was restored.

== Marriage and issue ==
Styles of Isabel Maria, Princess of Thurn and Taxis
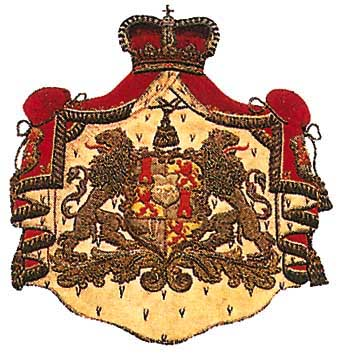
- Reference style: Her Royal Highness
- Spoken style: Your Royal Highness

Isabel Maria married Franz Joseph, Hereditary Prince of Thurn and Taxis, eldest son of Albert, 8th Prince of Thurn and Taxis and his wife Archduchess Margarethe Klementine of Austria, on 23 November 1920 in Bronnbach, Wertheim am Main, Baden-Württemberg, Germany. Isabel Maria and Franz Joseph had five children:

- Prince Gabriel of Thurn and Taxis (16 October 1922 – 17 December 1942)
- Princess Michaela of Thurn and Taxis (16 October 1922 – 17 October 1922)
- Princess Helene of Thurn and Taxis (27 May 1924 – 27 October 1991) married in Regensburg (civ) 18 April 1947 (rel) 29 April 1947 (annulled 1967, div 1968) Rudolf Erwein Graf von Schönborn-Wiesentheid (1 October 1918 – 3 May 1998)
- Princess Maria Theresia of Thurn and Taxis (10 September 1925 – 27 April 1997) married 19 June 1955 Franz Eduard Graf von Oppersdorff (19 June 1919 – 25 August 1985)
- Princess Maria Ferdinande of Thurn and Taxis (19 December 1927 – 9 June 2018) married in Regensburg 15 July 1950 (div 1951) Prince Franz Joseph von Hohenzollern (15 March 1926 – 13 March 1996)

== Ancestry ==
Ancestors of Princess Isabel Maria of Braganza

8. John VI of Portugal
4. Miguel I of Portugal
9. Infanta Carlota Joaquina of Spain
2. Miguel Januário, Duke of Braganza
10. Constantine, Hereditary Prince of Löwenstein
5. Princess Adelaide of Löwenstein
11. Princess Agnes of Hohenlohe-Langenburg
1. Princess Isabel Maria of Braganza
12. Constantine, Hereditary Prince of Löwenstein (= 10)
6. Charles, Prince of Löwenstein
13. Princess Agnes of Hohenlohe-Langenburg (= 11)
3. Princess Maria Theresa of Löwenstein
14. Alois II, Prince of Liechtenstein
7. Princess Sophie of Liechtenstein
15. Countess Franziska Kinsky of Wchinitz and Tettau

Princess Isabel Maria of Braganza House of Braganza Cadet branch of the House of Aviz Born: 19 November 1894 Died: 12 January 1970
German nobility
Preceded by Archduchess Margarethe Klementine of Austria	Princess consort of Thurn and Taxis; 22 January 1952 – 12 January 1970	Succeeded by Countess Gloria von Schönburg-Glauchau
