= Prüfening Abbey =

Coordinates: 49°00′33″N 12°02′44″E

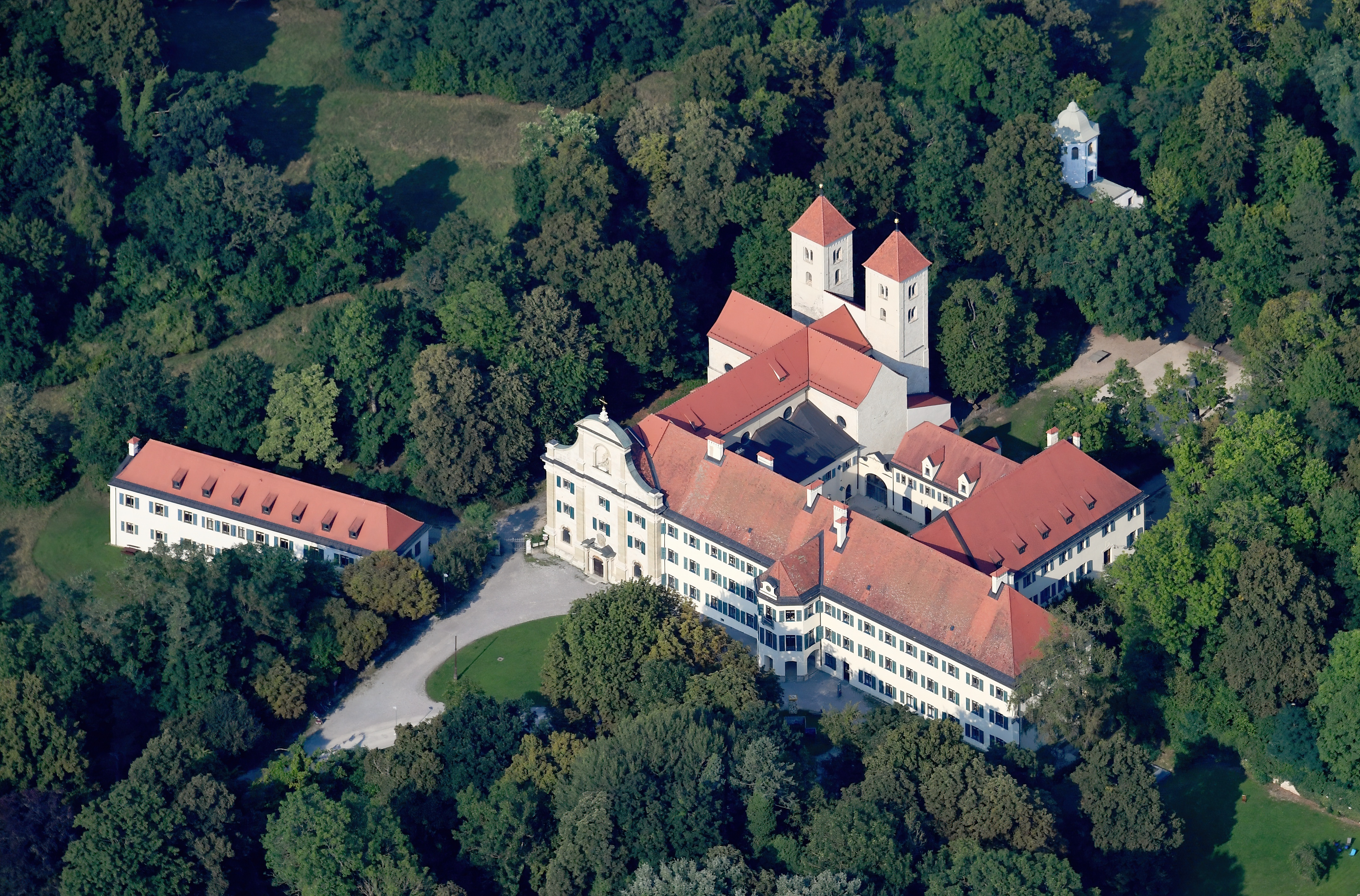
- Interactive map of Prüfening Abbey

Monastery information
- Order: Benedictine
- Established: 1119

People
- Founder: Otto I of Bamberg

Site
- Location: outskirts of Regensburg, Bavaria, Germany

Prüfening Abbey (German: Kloster Prüfening) was a Benedictine monastery on the outskirts of Regensburg in Bavaria, Germany. Since the beginning of the 19th century it has also been known as Prüfening Castle (Schloss Prüfening). Notably, its extant dedicatory inscription, commemorating the founding of the abbey in 1119, was created by printing and is a unique document of medieval typography.

== History ==
=== Monastery ===
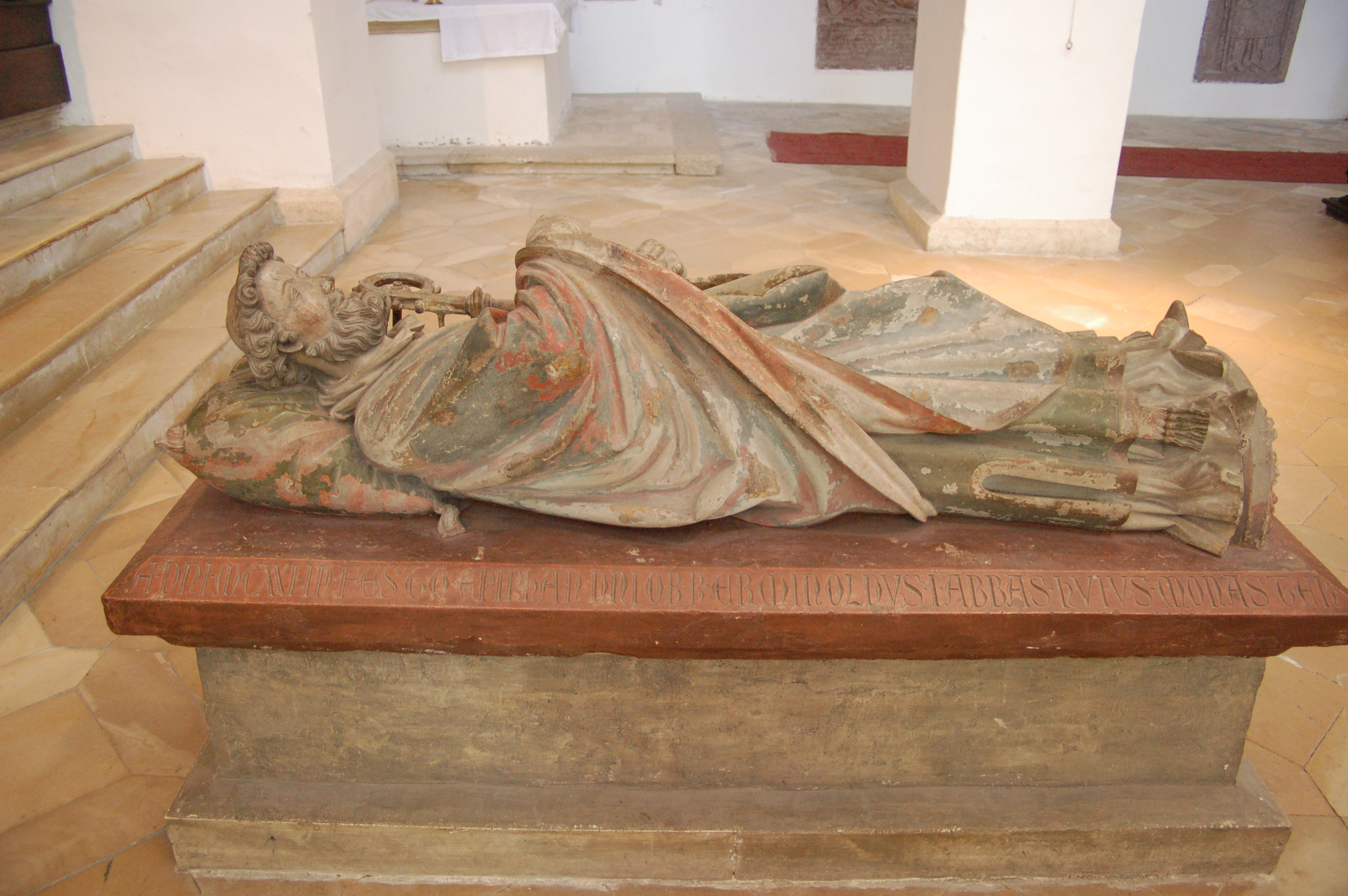
The tomb of abbot Erminold

The monastery is situated on the western edge of the town of Regensburg and was founded in 1119 by Bishop Otto I of Bamberg as a Benedictine abbey. The abbey church, dedicated to Saint George, completed in 1125, is the first major church building of the so-called "School of Hirsau" in Bavaria. It is a Romanesque basilica with a transept. The Romanesque wall-paintings are well-preserved.

The first abbot, Erminold, is supposed to have been killed by the monks because of his strictness. The tomb built in his honour by Bishop Heinrich II of Regensburg in 1283 was the work of one of the most important Regensburg cathedral master-builders. His name has not survived, but on the basis of this work he is known in art history as the "Erminold Master".

From the 1130s to the 1160s, the librarian, archivist and treasurer of Prüfening was Wolfger, who also wrote historical and biographical works.

=== Castle ===
The abbey was dissolved in 1803 during the secularisation of Bavaria. The buildings were sold, and since 1899 have been in the possession of the Princes of Thurn und Taxis. Prince Max Emanuel of Thurn and Taxis (1902–1994), known as "Father Emmeram" (German: Pater Emmeram), made efforts to re-establish a monastery in the buildings, which however came to nothing. Since 2002 a Montessori school has used the premises. The former abbey church serves as an auxiliary church for the Catholic parish of St. Boniface, Regensburg-Prüfening.
