= Baroness Wilhelmine of Dörnberg =

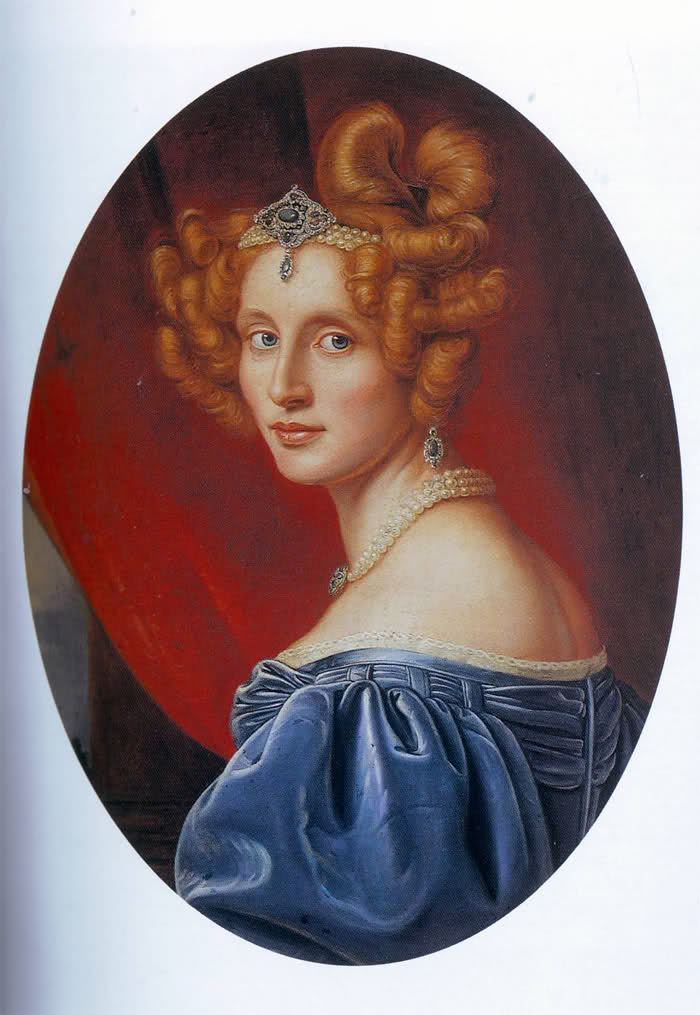
- Portrait, c. 1830

Princess consort of Thurn and Taxis
- Tenure: 24 August 1828 – 14 May 1835
- Born: 6 March 1803; Ansbach, Kingdom of Prussia
- Died: 14 May 1835 (aged 32); Nuremberg, Kingdom of Bavaria
- Burial: Gruftkapelle, Saint Emmeram's Abbey, Regensburg
- Spouse: Maximilian Karl, 6th Prince of Thurn and Taxis (m. 1828)
- Issue: Prince Karl Wilhelm; Princess Therese Mathilde; Maximilian Anton Lamoral, Hereditary Prince of Thurn and Taxis; Prince Egon; Prince Theodor
Names
- German: Wilhelmine Caroline Christiane Henriette
- House: Dörnberg
- Father: Ernst, Baron von Dörnberg
- Mother: Baroness Wilhelmine von Glauburg

Baroness Wilhelmine Caroline Christiane Henriette of Dörnberg, (German: Wilhelmine Caroline Christiane Henriette, Reichsfreiin von Dörnberg; 6 March 1803 – 14 May 1835) was a member of the House of Dörnberg and a Baroness of Dörnberg by birth. Through her marriage to Maximilian Karl, 6th Prince of Thurn and Taxis, Wilhelmine was also a member of the House of Thurn and Taxis. Wilhelmine was known to her family and friends as "Mimi."

== Early life ==
Wilhelmine was the daughter of the former Prussian Vice President and Director of the royal chamber of Brandenburg-Ansbach, Baron Ernst Heinrich Konrad Friedrich von Dörnberg and Baroness Wilhelmine Sophie Henriette Maximiliane von Glauburg.

She had two elder siblings, a brother, Count Ernst Friedrich von Dörnberg and one sister, Countess Sophie von Pückler-Limpurg.

== Marriage and issue ==
Wilhelmine married Maximilian Karl, 6th Prince of Thurn and Taxis, fourth child of Karl Alexander, 5th Prince of Thurn and Taxis and his wife Duchess Therese of Mecklenburg-Strelitz, on 24 August 1828 in Regensburg. Princess Wilhelmine and Prince Maximilian Karl had five children, four sons and one daughter:

- Prince Karl Wilhelm of Thurn and Taxis (14 April 1829 – 21 July 1829)
- Princess Therese Mathilde of Thurn and Taxis (31 August 1830 – 10 September 1883), 1. ⚭ Duke Carl Alfred August Konstantin von Beaufort-Spontin (1816-1888), 2. ⚭ Wilhelm von Pirch (d. 1881)
- Maximilian Anton Lamoral, Hereditary Prince of Thurn and Taxis (28 September 1831 – 26 June 1867) ⚭ Duchess Helene in Bavaria
- Prince Egon of Thurn and Taxis (17 November 1832 – 8 February 1892) ⚭ Viktoria Edelspacher de Gyorok (1841-1895) and had issue
- Prince Theodor of Thurn and Taxis (9 February 1834 – 1 March 1876) ⚭ Baroness Melanie von Seckendorff (1841-1919) and had issue

Wilhelmine's family, the House of Dörnberg, was a Protestant Hessian noble family and was not, according to the laws of the Princely House of Thurn and Taxis Family Act of 1776, equal in rank to her husband's family. Despite the fierce resistance to the union from the members of the princely house, especially from Maximilian Karl's mother Therese, the two married.

Wilhelmine's only brother, Baron Ernst Friedrich von Dörnberg (1801-1878), became chief of the Thurn and Taxis administration and was elevated to the title of Graf von Dörnberg (Count of Dörnberg) in Vienna on February 21, 1865.

== Illness and death ==
In 1834, Wilhelmine fell ill on a hard drive to Castle Chraustowitz, one of the many estates that Thurn and Taxis family possessed in Bohemia. At the beginning of 1835, she went to Nuremberg to receive a homeopathic treatment with Dr. Reuter. Wilhelmine was hopeful that the treatments would restore her quality of life. However, she died on 14 May 1835.

== Ancestry ==
Ancestors of Baroness Wilhelmine of Dörnberg

8. Johann Caspar, Baron of Dörnberg
4. Pandolphus Ferdinand, Baron of Dörnberg
9. Baroness Sophie Charlotte of Heyden
2. Ernst, Baron of Dörnberg
10. Carl Ludwig von Löwenstein
5. Caroline Dorothea von Löwenstein
11. Dorothea Catharine von Baumbach
1. Baroness Wilhelmine of Dörnberg
12. Hieronymus Maximilian von Glauburg
6. Friedrich Maximilian, Baron von Glauburg
13. Marie Charlotte von Lersner
3. Baroness Wilhelmine Henriette Maximiliane von Glauburg
14. Carl Friedrich von Geismar
7. Wilhelmine Auguste Caroline von Geismar
15. Johannette Henriette Gayling von Altheim

Baroness Wilhelmine of Dörnberg House of Dörnberg Born: 6 March 1803 Died: 14 May 1835
German nobility
Preceded by Duchess Therese of Mecklenburg-Strelitz	Princess consort of Thurn and Taxis; 24 August 1828 – 14 May 1835	Succeeded by Princess Mathilde Sophie of Oettingen-Oettingen and Oettingen-Spielberg
