= Archduchess Klothilde Maria of Austria =

Austrian archduchess (1884–1903)

Archduchess Klothilde Maria
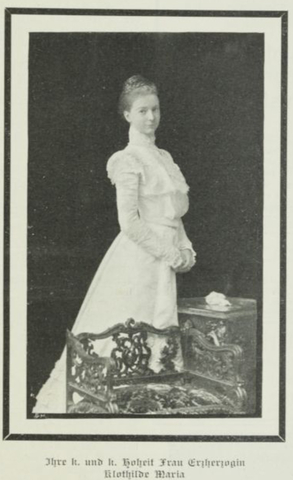
- Archduchess Klothilde Maria, c. 1900
- Born: 9 May 1884; Rijeka, Austria-Hungary
- Died: 14 December 1903 (aged 19); Alcsút, Hungary, Austria-Hungary
- Burial: 18 December 1903; Palatinal Crypt, Budapest, Hungary
Names
- Klothilde Maria Amalie Philomena Raineria
- House: House of Habsburg-Lorraine
- Father: Archduke Joseph Karl of Austria
- Mother: Princess Clotilde of Saxe-Coburg and Gotha

Archduchess Klothilde Maria of Austria (9 May 1884 – 14 December 1903) was a member of the Hungarian line of the House of Habsburg-Lorraine.

== Early life ==
Archduchess Klothilde Maria was born on 9 May 1884 in Rijeka, Austria-Hungary. She was the youngest child and the fifth daughter of Archduke Joseph Karl of Austria and Princess Clotilde of Saxe-Coburg and Gotha.

She spent her childhood at her family's primary residence, Alcsút Palace in Hungary. Her upbringing was private, centered around the estate where her father managed agricultural properties and botanical gardens, remaining detached from public court life.

== Death ==
Archduchess Klothilde Maria died unmarried due to complications of pneumonia on 14 December 1903 at Alcsút Palace in Hungary, Austria-Hungary, at the age of 19. Following her passing, her remains were transported to Budapest, where she was interred and beside her older brother Archduke Ladislaus on 18 December 1903 within the Palatinal Crypt at Buda Castle .

== Ancestry ==
Ancestors of Archduchess Klothilde Maria of Austria

8. Leopold II, Holy Roman Emperor
4. Archduke Joseph, Palatine of Hungary
9. Infanta Maria Luisa of Spain
2. Archduke Joseph Karl, Palatine of Hungary
10. Duke Louis of Württemberg
5. Duchess Maria Dorothea of Württemberg
11. Princess Henriette of Nassau-Weilburg
1. Archduchess Klothilde Maria of Austria
12. Prince Ferdinand of Saxe-Coburg and Gotha
6. Prince August of Saxe-Coburg and Gotha
13. Princess Maria Antonia Koháry of Csábrág and Szitnya
3. Princess Clotilde of Saxe-Coburg and Gotha
14. Louis Philippe I of France
7. Princess Clémentine of Orléans
15. Princess Maria Amalia of Naples and Sicily

== Bibliography ==
- Gothaisches Genealogisches Taschenbuch der Fürstlichen Häuser. Gotha: Justus Perthes. 1904.
- Genealogisches Handbuch des Adels, Fürstliche Häuser, Band II. Glücksburg/Lahn: C.A. Starke Verlag. 1953. ISSN 0435-2408.
