= Archduchess Maria Dorothea of Austria =

Austrian archduchess and Duchess of Orléans (1867–1932)

Archduchess Maria Dorothea
- Duchess of Orléans
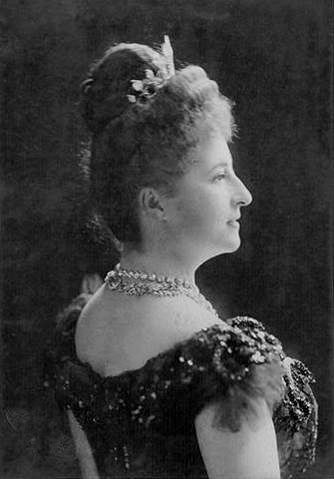
- Archduchess Maria Dorothea, c. 1913

Consort of the Orléanist pretender to the French throne
- Pretendence: 5 November 1896 – 28 March 1926
- Born: 14 June 1867; Alcsút, Austria-Hungary
- Died: 6 April 1932 (aged 64); Alcsút, Kingdom of Hungary
- Burial: Palatinal Crypt, Buda Castle, Budapest, Hungary
- Spouse: Philippe, Duke of Orléans (m. 1896; sep. 1914)
Names
- German: Maria Dorothea Amalie von Habsburg-Lothringen; Hungarian: Habsburg–Lotaringiai Mária Dorottya Amália; French: Marie Dorothée Amélie de Habsbourg-Lorraine
- House: Habsburg-Lorraine
- Father: Archduke Joseph Karl, Palatine of Hungary
- Mother: Princess Clotilde of Saxe-Coburg and Gotha

Archduchess Maria Dorothea of Austria (German: Erzherzogin Maria Dorothea Amalie von Österreich; 14 June 1867 – 6 April 1932) was a member of the Hungarian line of the House of Habsburg and an archduchess of Austria by birth. Through her marriage to Prince Philippe, Duke of Orléans, she became a member of the House of Orléans. As Philippe was the Orléanist claimant to the French throne, Maria Dorothea was recognized by Orléanist monarchists as the titular queen of France from 1896 until the couple's legal separation in 1914. Following Philippe's death in 1926, she was regarded by supporters as the dowager queen until her death in 1932.

== Family ==
Maria Dorothea was the second-eldest daughter and child of Archduke Joseph Karl of Austria and his wife Princess Clotilde of Saxe-Coburg and Gotha. Through her father Joseph Karl, she was a great-granddaughter of Leopold II, Holy Roman Emperor.Through her mother, Maria Dorothea also was a great-granddaughter of Louis Philippe I. She was name after her grandmother Duchess Maria Dorothea of Württemberg.

She was known as Mariska to her relatives.

== Marriage ==
Maria Dorothea married her second cousin, Prince Philippe, Duke of Orléans ("Philippe VIII" in the list of French pretenders), eldest son of Prince Philippe, Count of Paris ("Louis Philippe II" or "Philippe VII") and his wife Princess Marie Isabelle of Orléans, on 5 November 1896 in Vienna.

After several years of marriage, the couple's marriage deteriorated and Maria Dorothea began to spend more and more time each year at her family's estate, Alcsút Palace. Nevertheless, in 1906, Philippe attempted to reconnect with his wife and went to Alcsút to convince her to settle with him at the Manoir d'Anjou near Brussels. Maria Dorothea resisted the living arrangement and remained at Alcsút.

== Honours ==
- Dame Grand Cross of Honour and Devotion of the Sovereign Military Order of Malta (1909)
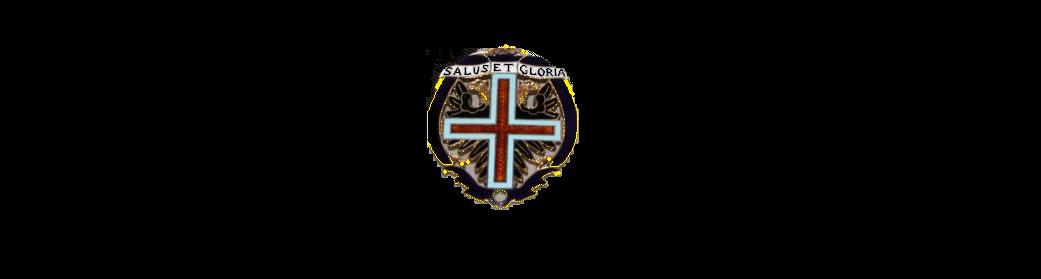
- Dame of the Order of the Starry Cross (House of Habsburg-Lorraine)
- Dame First Class of the Order of Saint Elizabeth (Kingdom of Bavaria)
- Dame of the Order of Queen Maria Luisa (Kingdom of Spain)

== Ancestry ==
Ancestors of Archduchess Maria Dorothea of Austria

8. Leopold II, Holy Roman Emperor
4. Archduke Joseph, Palatine of Hungary
9. Infanta Maria Luisa of Spain
2. Archduke Joseph Karl, Palatine of Hungary
10. Duke Louis of Württemberg
5. Duchess Maria Dorothea of Württemberg
11. Princess Henriette of Nassau-Weilburg
1. Archduchess Maria Dorothea of Austria
12. Prince Ferdinand of Saxe-Coburg and Gotha
6. Prince August of Saxe-Coburg and Gotha
13. Princess Maria Antonia Koháry of Csábrág and Szitnya
3. Princess Clotilde of Saxe-Coburg and Gotha
14. Louis Philippe, King of France
7. Princess Clémentine of Orléans
15. Princess Maria Amalia of Naples and Sicily

Archduchess Maria Dorothea of Austria House of Habsburg-Lorraine Cadet branch of the House of Lorraine Born: 14 June 1867 Died: 6 April 1932
Titles in pretence
Vacant Title last held by Marie Isabelle d'Orléans	— TITULAR — Queen consort of France; Orléanist; 5 November 1896 – 28 March 1926	Succeeded by Isabelle d'Orléans
