= Archduchess Maria Dorothea =

Archduchess Maria Dorothea may refer to:

- Archduchess Maria Dorothea of Austria
- Duchess Maria Dorothea of Württemberg
