= Palatinal Crypt =

Habsburg family crypt in the Royal Castle of Buda

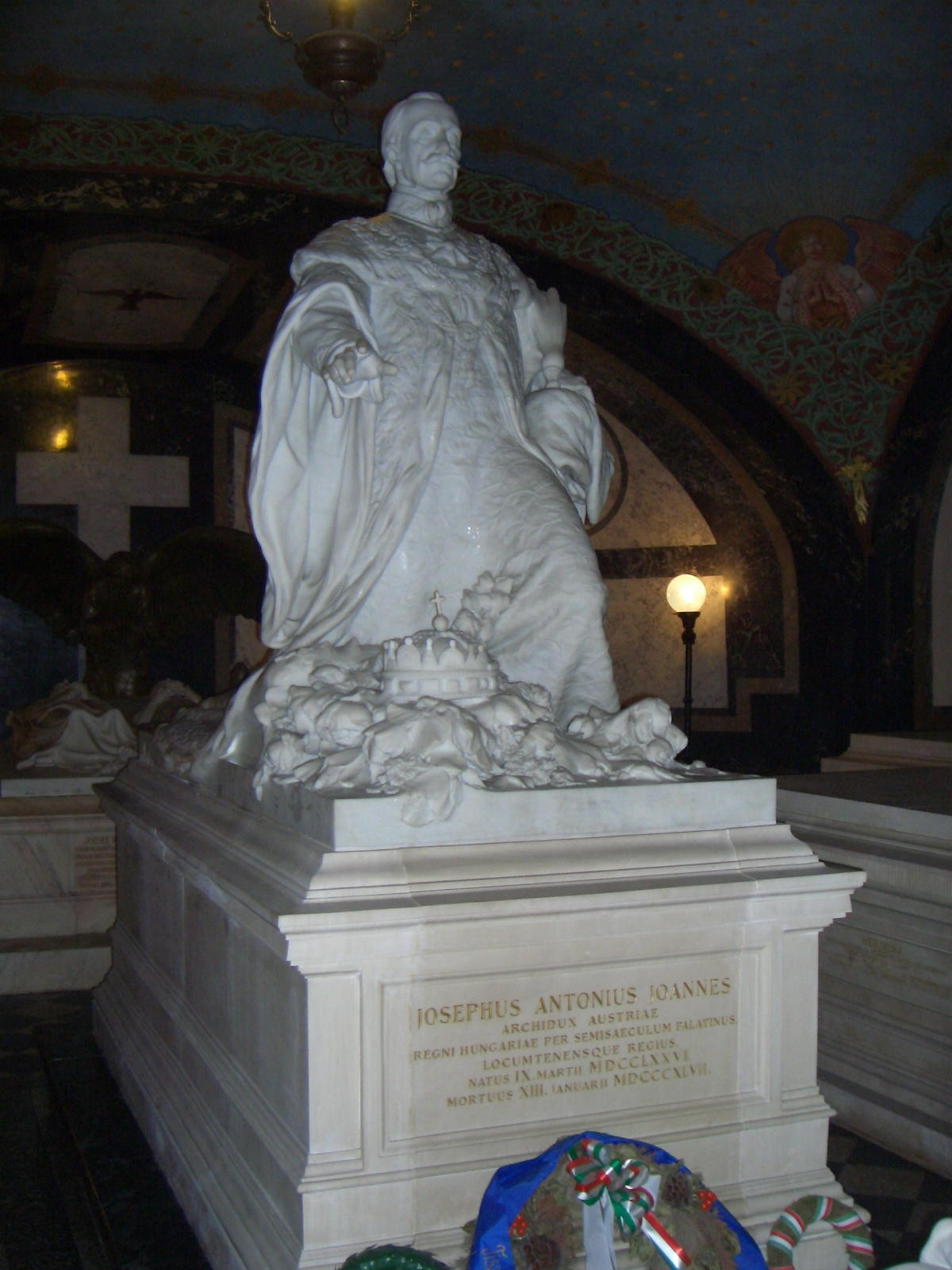
- Tombstone of Palatine Joseph, work of György Zala
- Interactive map of Palatinal Crypt

Details
- Established: 1838
- Location: Buda Castle, Budapest
- Country: Hungary
- Coordinates: 47.49628°N 19.03967°E
- Type: Royal tombs
- Style: Historicism
- Owned by: Hungarian state
- No. of graves: 16

The Palatinal Crypt (Hungarian: Nádori kripta; German: Palatinsgruft) in Buda Castle, Budapest is the burial place of the Hungarian branch of the Habsburg dynasty, founded by Archduke Joseph, Palatine of Hungary. It is the only interior part of Buda Castle which survived the destruction of World War II and was not demolished during the subsequent decades of rebuilding.

== History ==
The Palatinal Crypt is located under the former Castle Church, built in 1768 (and finally destroyed in 1957), in the central wing of the palace. The underground crypt was first used as a burial place between 1770 and 1777. Only ten people were buried, including five infants, all of them commoners. Later their corpses were removed. On 23 August 1820 Elisabeth Karoline, the infant daughter of Palatine Joseph was buried in the crypt. Seventeen years later, the Palatine's 13-year-old son Alexander Leopold followed. This time Palatine Joseph decided to convert the crypt into a family mausoleum. He asked for permission from the Viennese court and commissioned architect Franz Hüppmann with the task. The work was finished in March 1838. The Palatine's first and second wives, Alexandra Pavlovna of Russia and Princess Hermine of Anhalt-Bernburg-Schaumburg-Hoym, and his infant daughter, Paulina, were reburied here. The next burial was another palatinal daughter, Archduchess Hermine Amalie in 1842. Palatine Joseph himself was interred on 13 January 1847.

Stone sarcophagi were erected by Palatine Stephen in 1847. The crypt was damaged during the siege of Buda by the Hungarian revolutionary armies in 1849. It was restored by Archduke Joseph Charles, the younger son of Palatine Joseph in 1852. The reconstruction was carried out according to the plans of Ágost Pollack. The crypt was rebuilt again between 1897 and 1926 by Alajos Hauszmann according to wishes of Archduke Joseph Charles and later Archduchess Klotild, Joseph Charles' widow. After Hauszmann's death the work remained unfinished.

The crypt was continuously used by the Hungarian branch of the Habsburg family. It was enriched with new works of art, frescoes, statues, and ornate stone sarcophagi, made by the best artists of the 19th century. A list of later burials:

- Maria Dorothea, the third wife of the Palatine in 1855.
- Archduchess Elisabeth Klementine in 1866.
- Palatine Stephen in 1867.
- Archduke Ladislaus Philipp in 1895.
- Archduchess Gisella in 1901.
- Archduchess Klotild in 1903.
- Archduke Joseph Charles in 1905.
- Archduke Matthew in 1905.
- Archduchess Klotild in 1927, the last member of the family to be buried there.

The crypt survived World War II unscathed and was not destroyed during the post-war reconstruction, though it was closed to the public. The memory of Palatine Joseph was respected even by the postwar Communist government and his statue in Pest was spared. The crypt was robbed several times during the reconstruction works, first in 1966. The most serious incident happened in 1973, when the corpses were thrown out of their sarcophagi by the robbers. Later the human remains were identified and reburied. The crypt was restored in 1985-1987. The official opening ceremony on 3 October 1987 was attended by eleven descendants of Palatine Joseph. Since then the Palatinal Crypt is part of the exhibition of the Hungarian National Gallery.

== Vaults ==
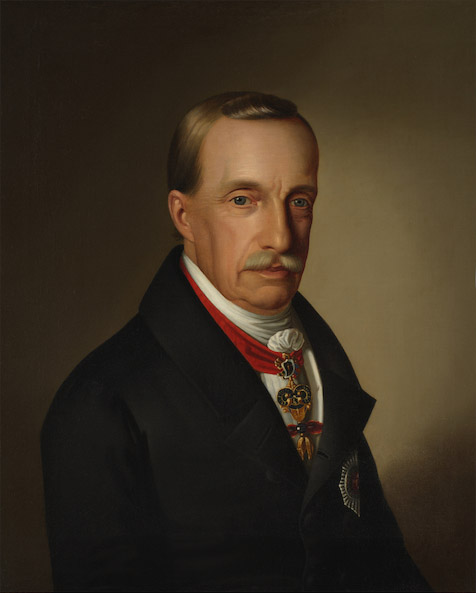
Palatine Joseph, founder of the crypt, painted by Miklós Barabás

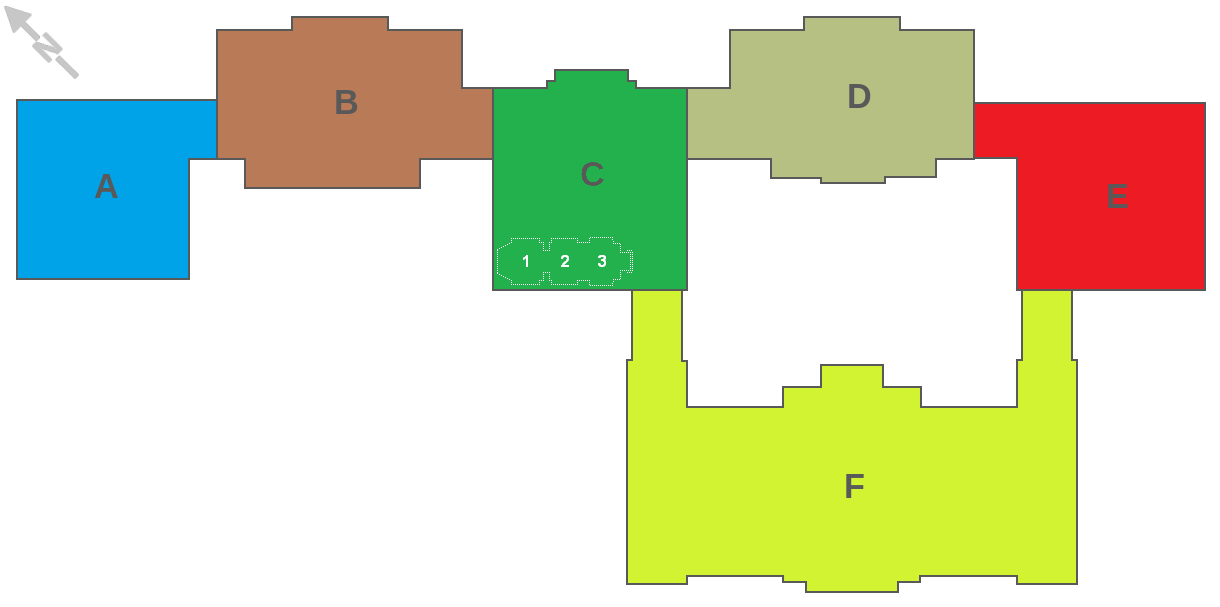
Plan of Buda Castle: buildings A, B, C, D – Hungarian National Gallery, building E – Budapest Historical Museum, building F – National Széchényi Library. Palatinal Crypt (subterranean): room 1 – older burials, room 2 – newer burials, room 3 – chapel and crypt access.

The Palatinal Crypt consists of three interconnected vaults. The crypt itself is identical with the innermost vault (Room C). In Room B and C the side walls are clad with false marble revetment while the vaulted ceiling is decorated with frescoes depicting the starry sky and angels in the corners. There is a terrazzo floor in grey and claret hues.

- Room 3 - A small chapel with a simple altar. The Archdiocese of Esztergom gave permission to celebrate mass in the crypt on 23 April 1838.
- Room 2 - The middle room was left empty during Palatine Joseph's lifetime. Later two Habsburg children were buried here, Archduchess Gizella (1897-1901) and Archduke Matthew (1904-1905), grand-grandchildren of the Palatine. Gizella's sarcophagus is decorated with the charming statue of the small archduchess, made by sculptor Károly Senyei. The marble statue was modelled after a family photograph.

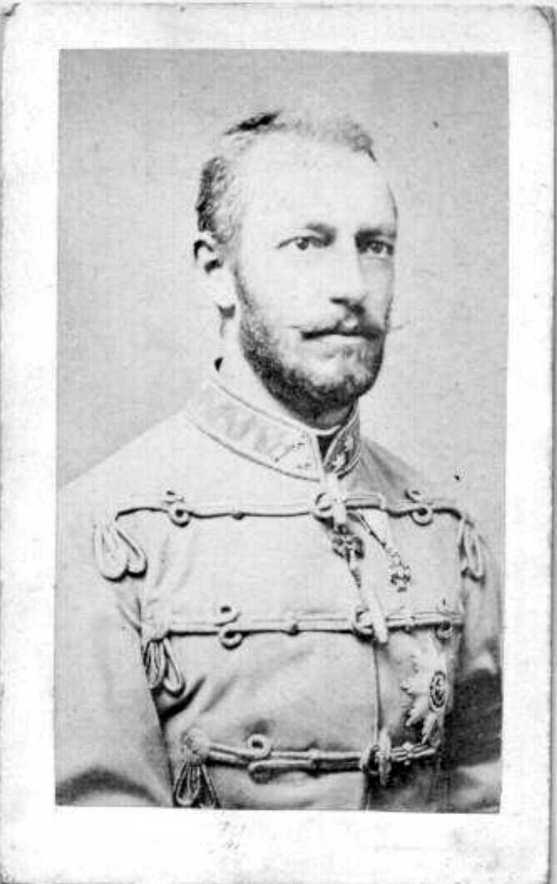
Archduke Joseph Charles who rebuilt the old family crypt

- Room 1 - The innermost vault houses 12 sarcophagi. The sarcophagus of Palatine Joseph (1776-1847) is situated in the middle of the room. It is decorated with a monumental, double life-sized marble statue, made by sculptor György Zala. The Palatine is kneeling, his right arm stretched out protectively above the Crown of Saint Stephen. There is a small tomb at the entrance of the vault, right in front of Palatine Joseph's sarcophagus, which contains the remains of Archduchess Elisabeth Clementine (1865-1866). It is decorated with the charming marble statue of the small archduchess, praying to God (made by Alajos Stróbl).

A big double sarcophagus near the southern wall of the crypt contains the bodies of Archduke Joseph Charles (1833-1905) and his wife, Klotild (1846-1927). Their marble statues were made by György Zala and modelled after their death masks. A bronze Angel of the Peace is standing above them with outstretched wings. During the restoration works in 1978 Archduchess Klotild Maria (1884-1903) was reburied in the tomb of her parents.

The tomb of Ladislaus Philip (1875-1895) is decorated with a white marble statue of the young archduke who died in a tragic hunting accident. The statue was made by Alajos Stróbl and it was modelled after his death mask. Two tombs near the entrance contain the remains of Archduchess Elizabeth Carolina (1820) and Paulina (1801). The obelisks are decorated with flying bronze angels and crowned with archducal crowns.

The other tombs are simpler, with the remains of Palatine Stephen (1817-1867), Archduke Alexander Leopold (1827-1835), Archduchess Maria Dorothea (1797-1855), Archduchess Hermina Maria (1797-1817), Archduchess Hermina Amalie (1817-1842) and Alexandra Pavlovna of Russia (1783-1801).

== See also ==
- Interiors of Buda Castle
- Works of art in Buda Castle
- Imperial Crypt, Vienna
