= Princess Clotilde of Saxe-Coburg and Gotha =

Austrian archduchess; daughter of Prince August of Saxe-Coburg

Archduchess Clotilde
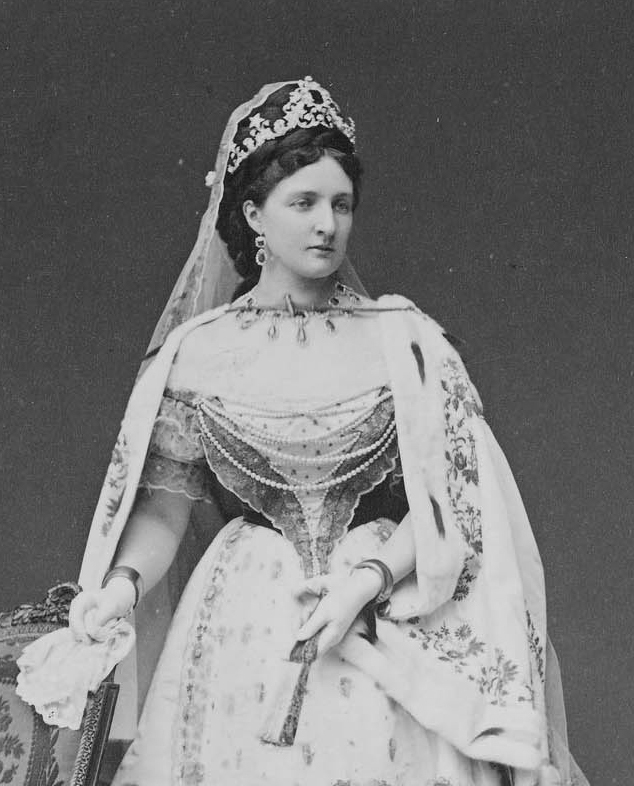
- Photograph c. 1870
- Born: 8 July 1846; Neuilly-sur-Seine, Île-de-France, Kingdom of France
- Died: 3 June 1927 (aged 80); Alcsút, Kingdom of Hungary
- Spouse: Archduke Joseph Karl, Palatine of Hungary (m. 1864; died 1905)
- Issue: Archduchess Elisabeth Klementine; Maria Dorothea, Duchess of Orléans; Margarethe Klementine, Princess of Thurn and Taxis; Archduke Joseph August; Archduke László Philipp; Archduchess Elisabeth Henriette; Archduchess Klothilde Maria
Names
- German: Marie Adelheid Amalie Clotilde
- House: Saxe-Coburg and Gotha-Koháry
- Father: Prince August of Saxe-Coburg and Gotha
- Mother: Princess Clémentine of Orléans

Princess Marie Adelheid Amalie Clotilde of Saxe-Coburg and Gotha, German: Marie Adelheid Amalie Clotilde, Prinzessin von Sachsen-Coburg und Gotha, Herzogin zu Sachsen (8 July 1846, Neuilly-sur-Seine, Île-de-France, Kingdom of France – 3 June 1927, Alcsút, Hungary) was a Princess of Saxe-Coburg and Gotha by birth and an Archduchess of Austria through her marriage to Archduke Joseph Karl, Palatine of Hungary.

== Early life ==
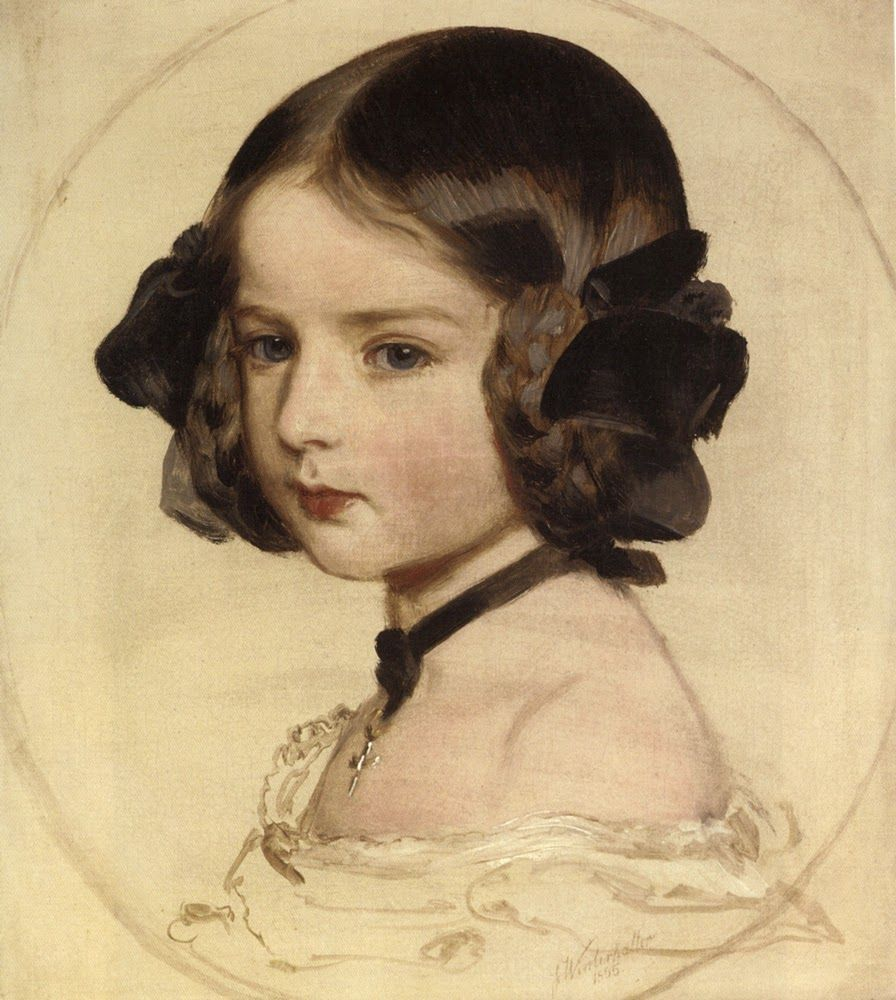
Portrait of Princess Clotilde at a young age, by Franz Xaver Winterhalter, 1855

Clotilde was born 3 July 1846. She was the third child and eldest daughter of Prince August of Saxe-Coburg and Gotha and Princess Clémentine of Orléans. Although her father was Austrian, she and her family spent her early childhood in France. When Clotilde was just 2 years old, her maternal grandfather, Louis Philippe I was deposed during the French Revolution of 1848, and her family was forced was forced to flee. At first they went to London, where they regularly met with Queen Victoria.

Clotilde's family later moved to Vienna to be with their father.

== Marriage and issue ==
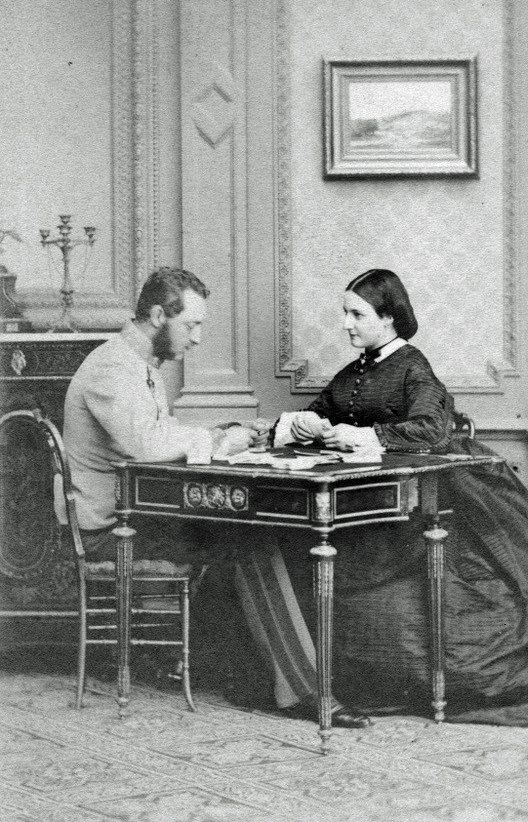
Clotilde and her husband, Archduke Joseph Karl of Austria, 1864

Clotilde married Archduke Joseph Karl, Palatine of Hungary, second son of Archduke Joseph, Palatine of Hungary, and Duchess Maria Dorothea of Württemberg, on 12 May 1864 in Coburg. They had seven children:

- Archduchess Elisabeth Klementine of Austria (18 March 1865 – 7 January 1866)
- Archduchess Maria Dorothea (14 June 1867 – 6 April 1932)
- Archduchess Margarethe Klementine (6 July 1870 – 2 May 1955)
- Archduke Joseph August Viktor Klemens Maria of Austria (9 August 1872 – 6 July 1962)
- Archduke László Philipp of Austria (16 July 1875 – 6 September 1895)
- Archduchess Elisabeth Henriette of Austria (9 March 1883 – 8 February 1958)
- Archduchess Klothilde Maria of Austria (9 May 1884 – 14 December 1903)

== Death ==
Clotilde died in Alcsút Palace on 3 Jun 1927, at the age of 80. Her body was buried next to her husband in the crypt of the Royal Palais, Budapest, Hungary.

== Ancestry ==
Ancestors of Princess Clotilde of Saxe-Coburg and Gotha

8. Francis, Duke of Saxe-Coburg-Saalfeld
4. Prince Ferdinand of Saxe-Coburg and Gotha
9. Countess Augusta Reuss of Ebersdorf
2. Prince August of Saxe-Coburg and Gotha
10. Ferenc József, Prince Koháry de Csábrág et Szitnya
5. Princess Maria Antonia Koháry of Csábrág and Szitnya
11. Countess Maria Antonia von Waldstein
1. Princess Clotilde of Saxe-Coburg and Gotha
12. Louis Philippe II, Duke of Orléans
6. Louis Philippe I of France
13. Louise Marie Adélaïde de Bourbon
3. Princess Clémentine of Orléans
14. Ferdinand I of the Two Sicilies
7. Princess Maria Amalia of Naples and Sicily
15. Archduchess Maria Carolina of Austria

== Bibliography ==
- Defrance, Olivier (2007). La Médicis des Cobourg: Clémentine d'Orléans. Brussels: Racine. ISBN 978-2873864866.
- Hamann, Brigitte (1988). The Habsburgs: A Biographical Dictionary. Vienna: Ueberreuter. ISBN 978-3800032471.
