= Hatvanpuszta =

Former Habsburg manor house owned by Viktor Orbán's family

Coordinates: 47°26′19″N 18°38′30″E

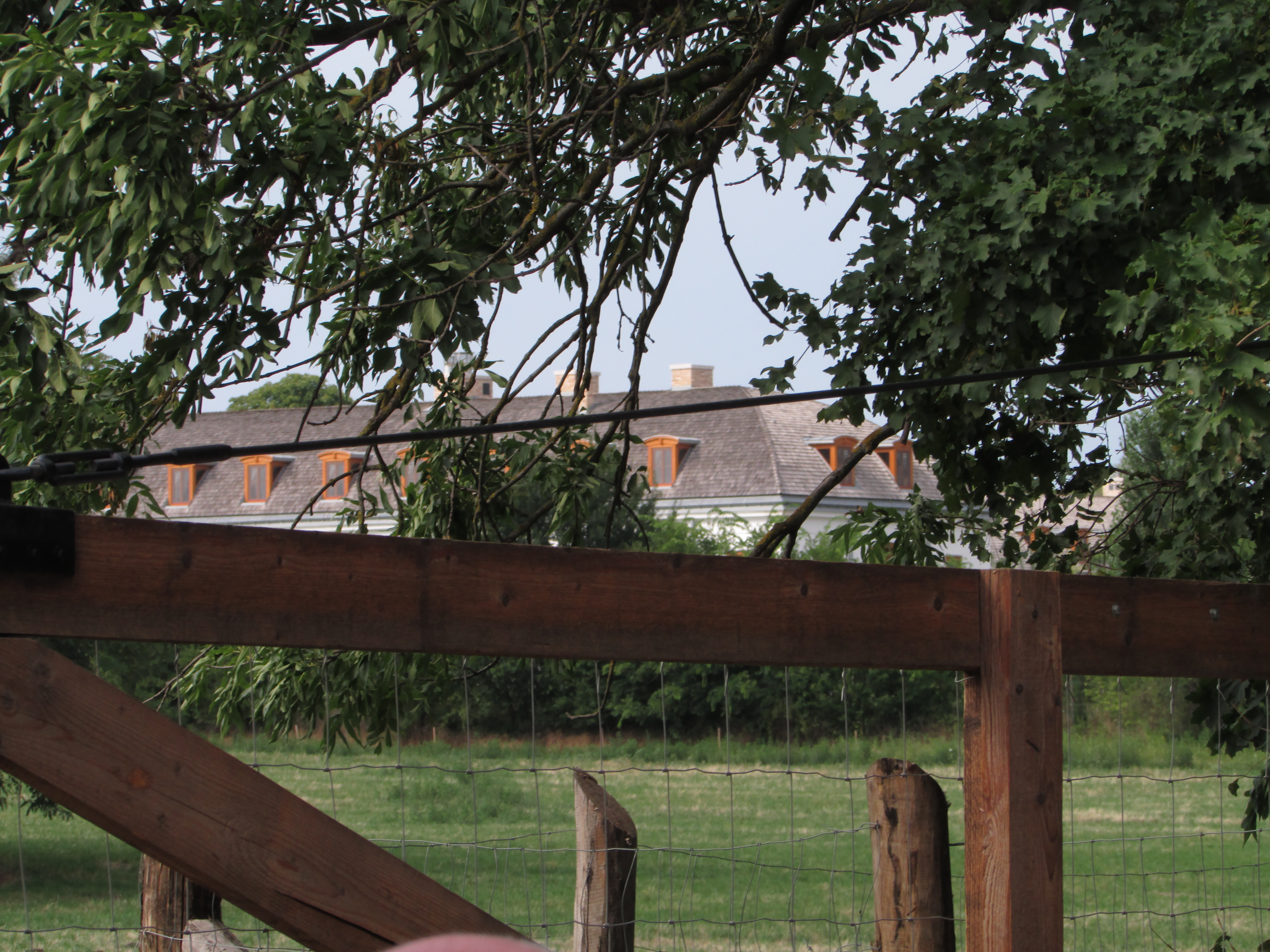
Main buildings at the Hatvanpuszta estate seen through the perimeter fence (August 2025)

Hatvanpuszta is a historic manor house in Hungary, located near Alcsút, notable for its origins as part of a model farming operation established by Archduke Joseph of Austria, the Palatine of Hungary, in the 19th century. Originally serving as a thriving agricultural hub, the estate played an important role in advancing Hungarian sheep breeding and agricultural innovation during its peak.

In recent years, Hatvanpuszta has gained national and international attention due to extensive redevelopment projects tied to the family of Hungary's Prime Minister, Viktor Orbán, who grew up in nearby Felcsút. What was once a relatively modest farming complex has been transformed into a vast and modern estate with luxurious amenities, sparking political controversy and public scrutiny. Investigative reports suggest that the estate's reconstruction represents not just a restoration of a historic property, but also a symbol of political power and wealth, raising questions about transparency and the blending of public and private interests in Hungary's leadership.

The estate, now encompassing modern buildings, underground facilities, and self-sustaining features, reflects a stark contrast between its historical agricultural roots and its current state as an exclusive and heavily privatized property. While officially framed as an agricultural and educational site, critics and opposition journalists claim that Hatvanpuszta is a private retreat for the Orbán family.

== History ==
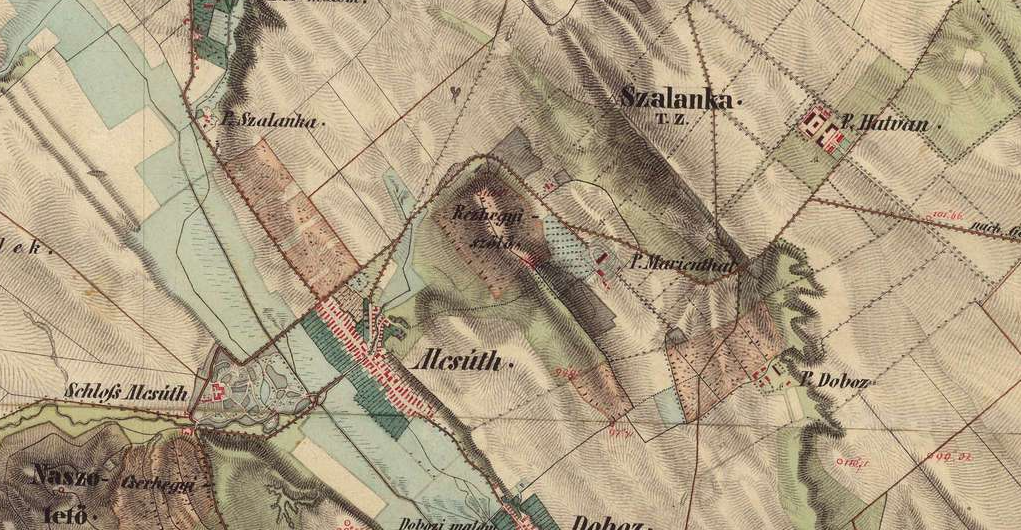
1869 map showing Alcsút and Alcsút Palace on the left and Hatvanpuszta's location right above

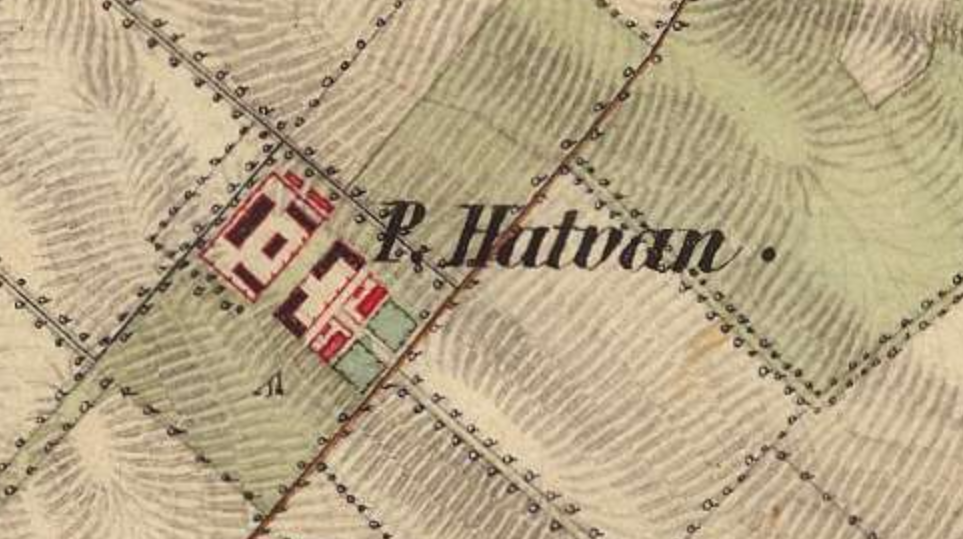
1869 map showing the buildings in Hatvanpuszta: the officer's quarters, the servants' residence, two large L-formed sheep stables, and a storage area for feed

=== Early history ===
The area now known as Hatvanpuszta is believed to have been the site of a village named Hatvan prior to the Ottoman conquest of Hungary in the 16th century. Following the expulsion of the Ottomans, much of the region was depopulated, and former settlements were often renamed with the addition of the term puszta (meaning "plain" or "deserted area") to signify their abandonment.

The earliest documented mention of Hatvanpuszta as an estate appeared on a 1783 military map under the name Hatvani puszta. It remained a modest settlement until the early 19th century when Archduke Joseph of Austria, the Palatine of Hungary, incorporated the area into his Alcsút estate and began significant development.

=== Transformation into a model farm ===
Around 1840, Archduke Joseph established Hatvanpuszta as a model farm, aiming to introduce modern agricultural practices to Hungary. The farm was specifically designed for sheep breeding, and under Joseph's direction, it became renowned for producing high-quality wool, vital to the country's textile industry. The Alcsút sheep, bred at Hatvanpuszta, were considered some of the finest in the region.

Prominent figures of the time, including poet and agriculturalist János Vajda, recognized Hatvanpuszta as a symbol of agricultural innovation. Vajda described it as a beacon of Hungary's modernization efforts, calling it a place where "the dawn of a new Hungary" was emerging.

Archduke Joseph's dedication to improving the barren and infertile soil of the estate was widely admired. His biographer, Sándor Lestyán, noted that the Palatine often sought refuge at Alcsút and Hatvanpuszta, finding solace and purpose in transforming the once barren lands into a productive paradise.

=== Decline and transformation (late 19th to early 20th century) ===
After Joseph's death, the estate gradually lost its prominence as a leading agricultural center. By the late 19th century, the focus shifted from innovation to maintenance, with much of its historical significance fading over time.

During the early 20th century, Hatvanpuszta continued as a functioning farm but lacked the grandeur and attention it had under Archduke Joseph's stewardship. By the mid-20th century, the estate fell into further decline, and some of its original structures were abandoned or repurposed.

=== 20th century changes ===
After the Second World War, the Alcsut estate was confiscated from the Habsburg family by the new Communist regime and became state-owned. It became part of the Bicske State Farm. In the 1960s, around 140 people lived at the farm. However, with the modernization of agriculture, fewer and fewer farm workers were needed, living conditions in the wilderness deteriorated, and the inhabitants were moved out in the 1980s, by the time of the regime change only three remained. In the 1990s, the estate changed into private hands, and was used for horse breeding.

By 2001, only five of the original buildings remained on the estate. These included the officer's quarters (with a partially collapsed roof), the servants' residence, two large stables, and a storage area for feed. Additionally, a concrete water tower, constructed during a later period, was also present. The site, though historically significant, was largely neglected and no longer served its original purpose.

Some of these structures gained protected status as historical monuments, but no major restoration efforts were undertaken for decades.

== Modern development and controversy ==
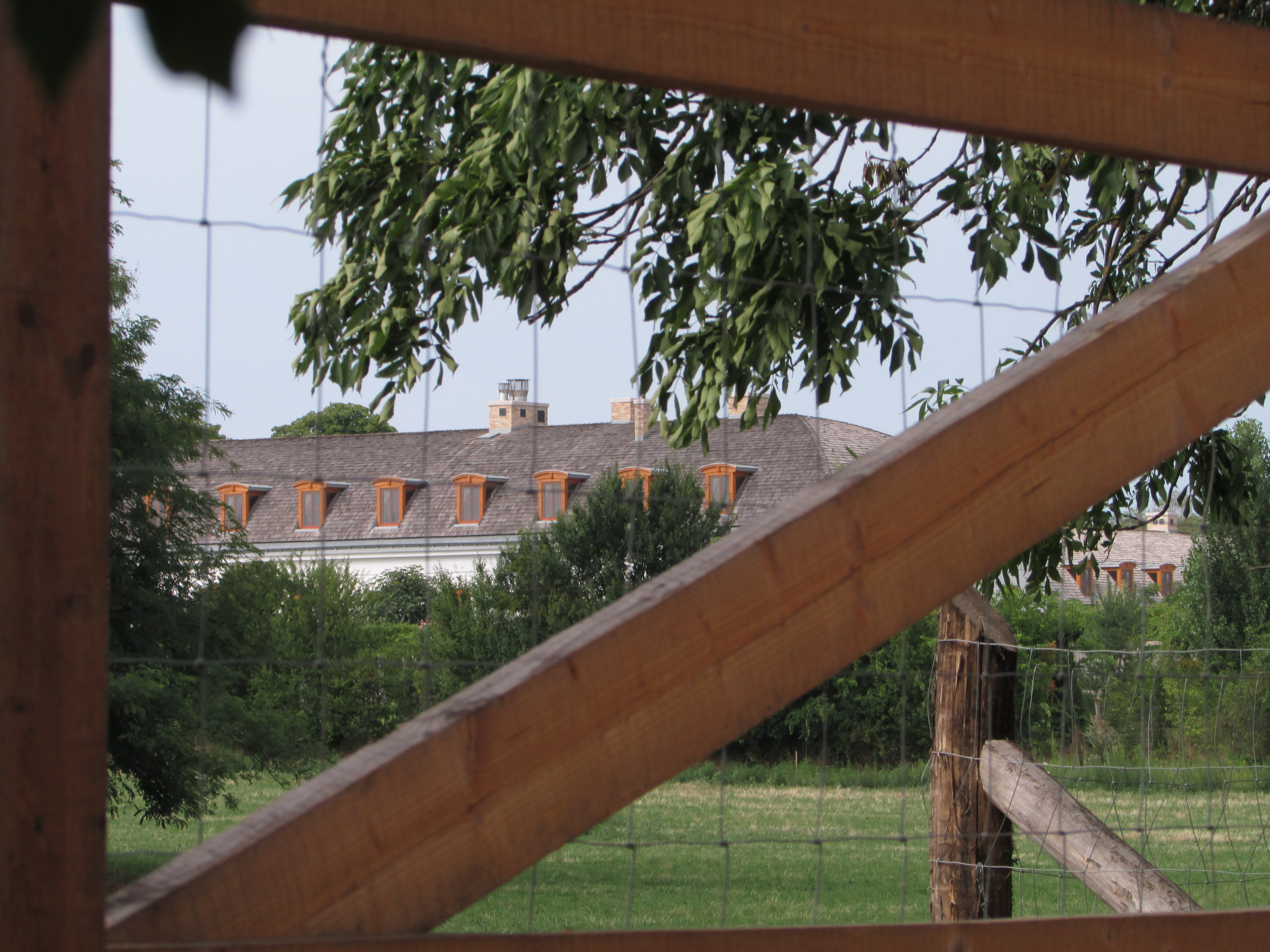
Main buildings at the Hatvanpuszta estate seen through the perimeter fence (August 2025)

=== Acquisition by Győző Orbán ===
In 2011, following Fidesz's parliamentary victory, Győző Orbán, father of Prime Minister Viktor Orbán, purchased the Hatvanpuszta estate through his real estate company. The property was subsequently leased to businessman Lőrinc Mészáros for ten years, who reportedly paid the purchase price through rental payments but did not use the land for personal purposes, but to store machinery. Over time, the surrounding state-owned lands were also acquired by Mészáros and other individuals associated with the Orbán family.

=== Major reconstruction (2018–2023) ===
The estate consists of two smaller mansion-like buildings (officers' residence and servants' quarters), two larger L-shaped sheepfolds, and a granary. Significant construction began after the 2018 elections. Architect Dániel Taraczky was engaged to help with the reconstruction and rebuilding of the manor farm. Aerial footage and investigative reports revealed:

- New Buildings: Original structures were demolished or rebuilt to include modern facilities, such as a 2,000-square-meter main building and additional wings.
- Basement Garages: Two underground garages were constructed, covering 1,200 square meters.
- Library and Atrium: The centrepiece of the main building is a two-story, atrium-style library with a spiral staircase and decorative ceilings inspired by Hungarian Reformed churches.
- Self-Sufficiency Features: Plans include a high-capacity generator with a 20,000-liter diesel tank, making the estate self-sustaining.
- Additional Amenities: A "contemplation path," a chapel, and a greenhouse were also part of the landscaping plans.

The project, covering 6,700 square meters, is estimated to have cost three to four billion forints (10-13 million US$), excluding landscaping and infrastructure costs.

=== Political criticism and allegations ===
Hatvanpuszta's redevelopment has drawn significant attention due to its association with Viktor Orbán. Critics allege the estate serves as a private retreat for the Prime Minister, undermining his public image as a modest, salary-dependent leader. Opposition journalists and politicians argue the secrecy surrounding the project—including restricted drone access and untraceable plans—suggests efforts to conceal its true purpose and financing. In contrast, government representatives and the Prime Minister himself assert that the construction is economic in nature, focusing on the development of the estate, and that the property belongs to the Prime Minister's father, Orbán Győző. As Viktor Orbán remarked, in their family, "children don't interfere in their parents' matters."

In 2021, changes to Hungarian drone laws and construction regulations made investigative reporting on the project increasingly difficult. Despite official claims that the estate is intended for agricultural and educational purposes, leaked photos and blueprints suggest luxurious uses, including a guesthouse, swimming pool and facilities for hosting events.

=== 2023 expansion ===
In 2023, the estate expanded by 25 hectares after Győző Orbán purchased three neighbouring plots of land for 68 million forints (204 075,48 USD). This addition reflects the continuous growth and significant financial investments in the property.

=== August 2025 protests at Hatvanpuszta ===
When independent MP Ákos Hadházy visited the complex covertly in August 2025, he filmed the area and its luxurious facilities, comparing it to the Palace of Versailles. Releasing a video of his stroll online caused widespread outrage in Hungary and beyond. Hadházy criticized the disparity between the estate's extravagance and its official designation as a "farm" belonging to Viktor Orbán's father. He pointed out security restrictions on construction workers, heated paving, and an underground tunnel as evidence of luxury. The property's dramatic appearance and association with political power led to comparisons with the Mezhyhirya Residence of former Ukrainian president Viktor Yanukovych. Hadházy's coverage was echoed by the New York Post spotlighted its opulence, highlighting features like dual swimming pools and the government's portrayal of the property as a modest family farm, remarking, "If true, these must be very lucky sheep." Critics claim "Orban and his cronies are building themselves a palace' from taxpayers' money."

In August 2025, Hadházy organized a public tour of Hatvanpuszta. During the first of these visits, participants were able to get a view into the inside of the fenced estate from a temporary ladder. Reports estimated that several thousand people attended. Media accounts described long queues of cars, stretching for at least two kilometres. Journalists also reported sightings of exotic animals, including zebras, antelopes, and buffaloes, which were only partly shielded from view despite security measures such as fencing, police patrols, and earthen embankments. Some reports indicated that the exotic animals were not located on the Hatvanpuszta estate itself, but on neighbouring land reportedly owned by businessman Lőrinc Mészáros. Mészáros, a close associate of Viktor Orbán, has stated in 2017 that his fortune is due to "three factors: God, luck, and Viktor Orbán".

The Vál Valley Hunting Association, a commercial hunting park that operates in the area near Hatvanpuszta, stated that the exotic animals had been rescued from previous owners and were in poor health due to neglect and malnutrition. According to the association, its veterinarians and trainers took responsibility for improving the animals' living conditions and extending their lifespans. The association is chaired by the daughter of Mészáros, Beatrix Mészáros.

In response to the criticism, Viktor Orbán said in an interview with a government-aligned newspaper that the estate had been "rotting away" when his father purchased it. He added that he had worked there as a student during his youth and therefore felt a personal connection to the site. Orbán described the property as a "family farm", rejecting media reports of alleged luxury, and emphasized that it is owned by his father, whom he referred to as a long-time entrepreneur. Independent and opposition media, however, questioned these claims, noting the estate's scale, its extensive redevelopment, and its resemblance to a private residence rather than a working farm; they also highlighted that Orbán's statements appeared in pro-government outlets and lacked independent verification of ownership and financing arrangements.

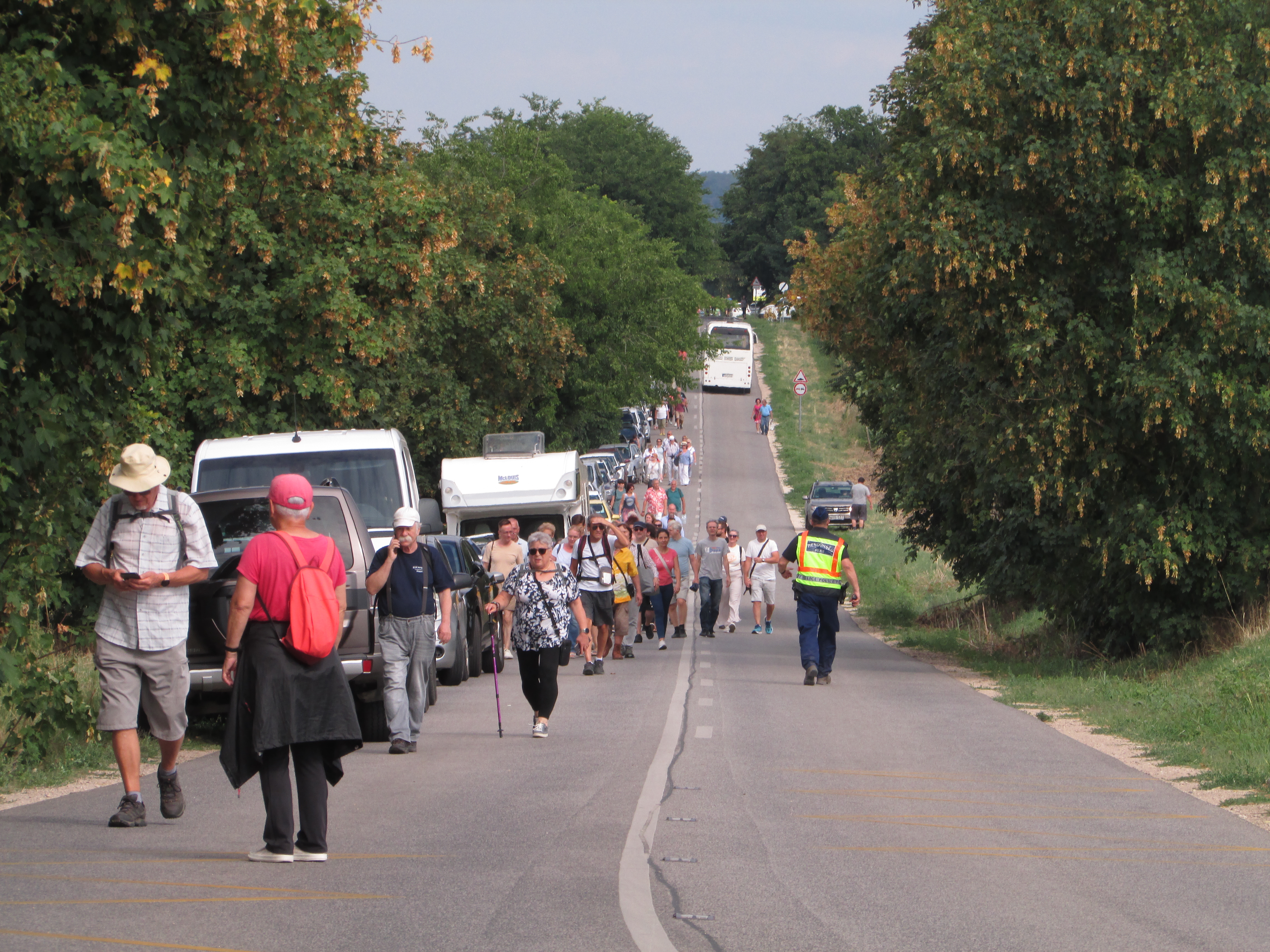
Protestors arriving at Hatvanpuszta

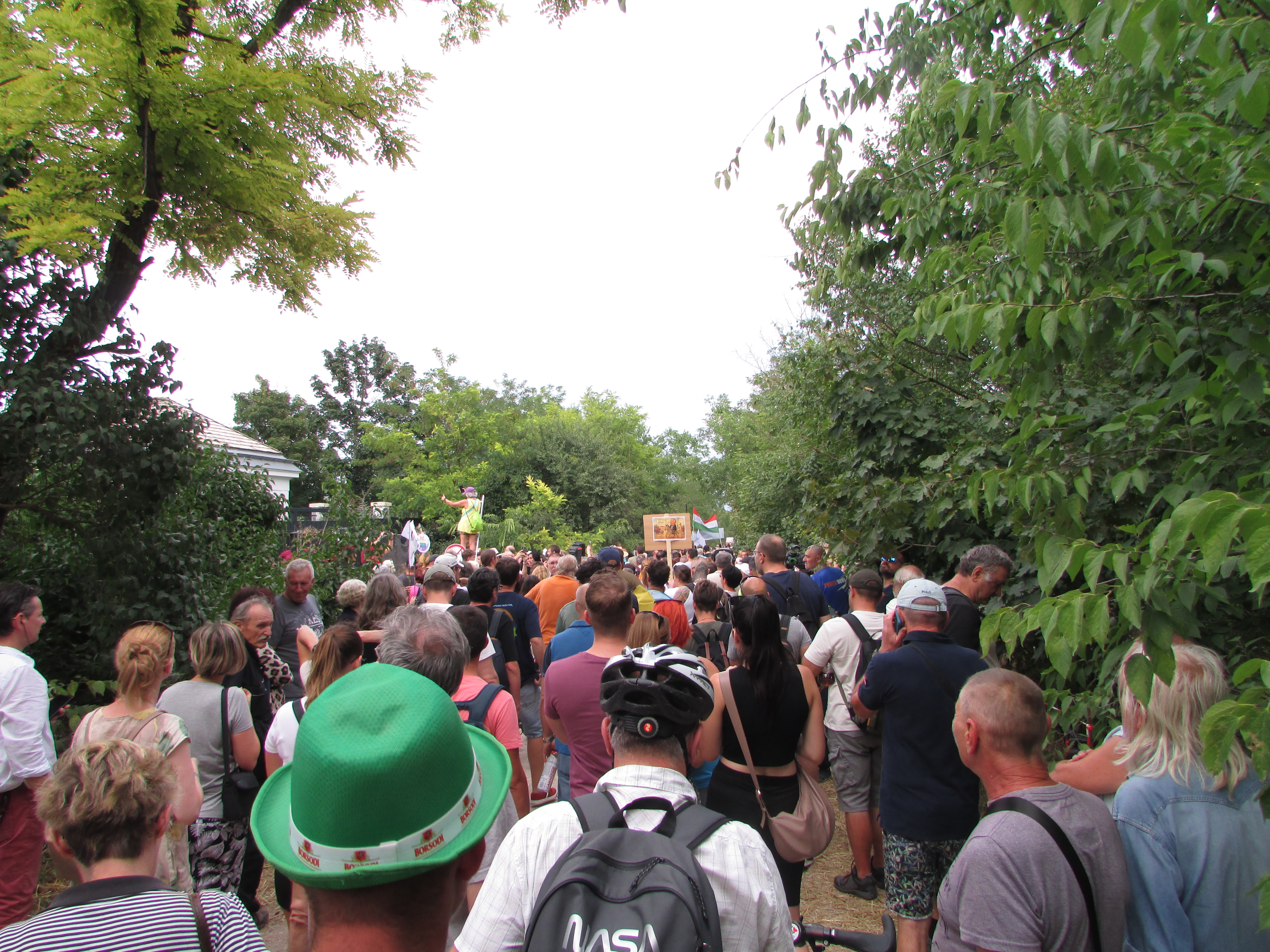
Protestors arriving at Hatvanpuszta

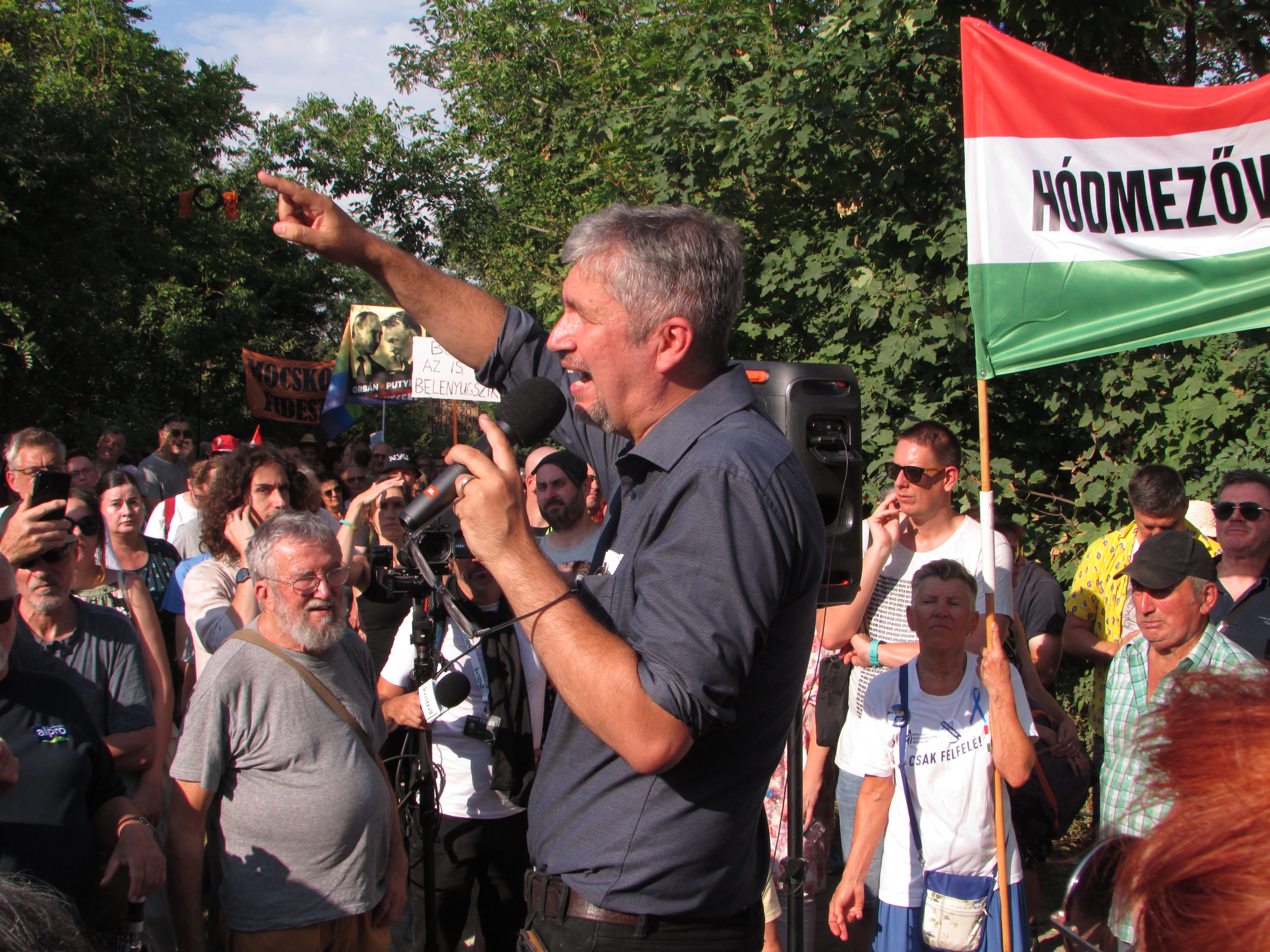
Ákos Hadházy pointing at Hatvanpuszta

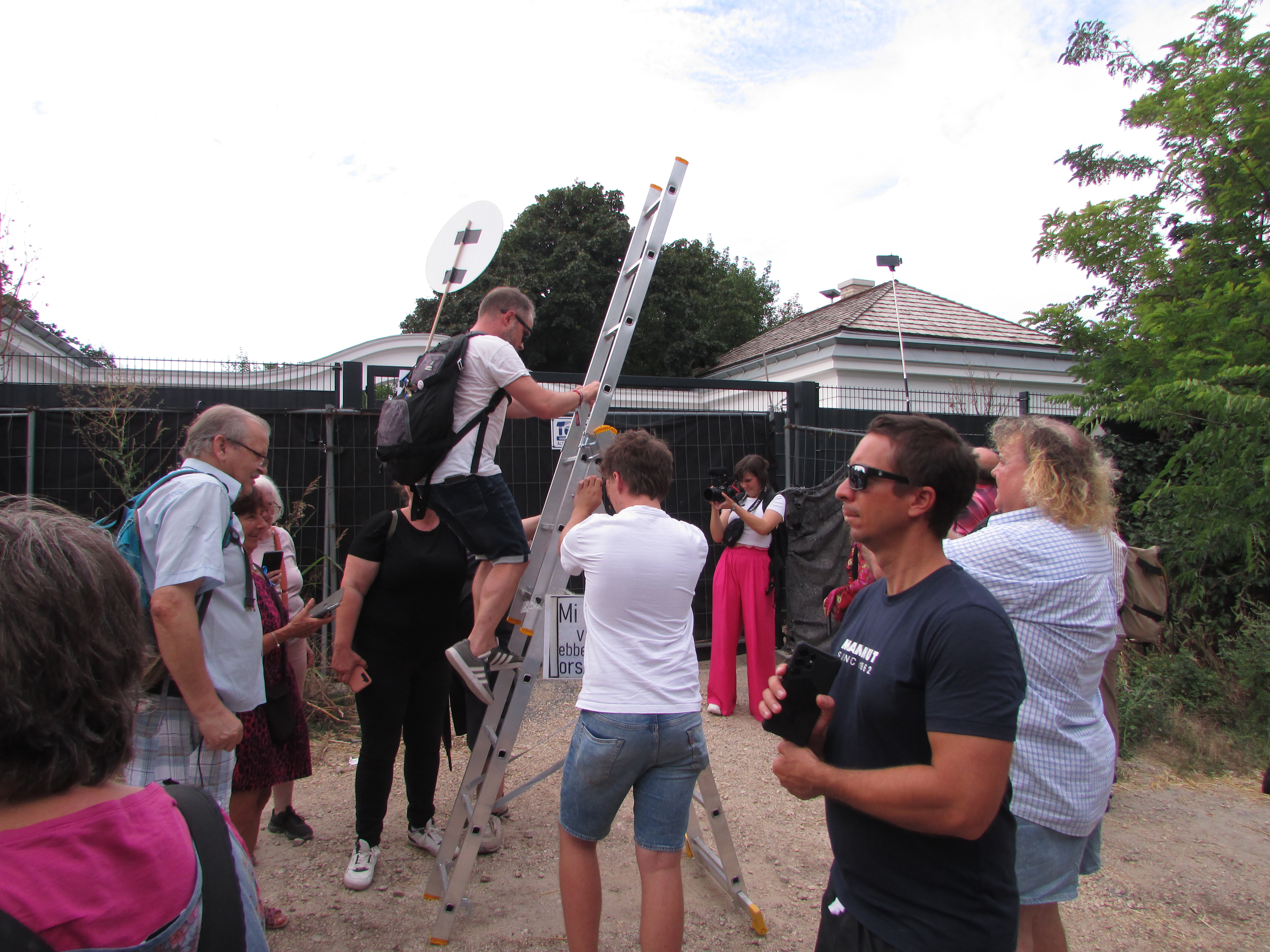
Ladder to peek over the fence

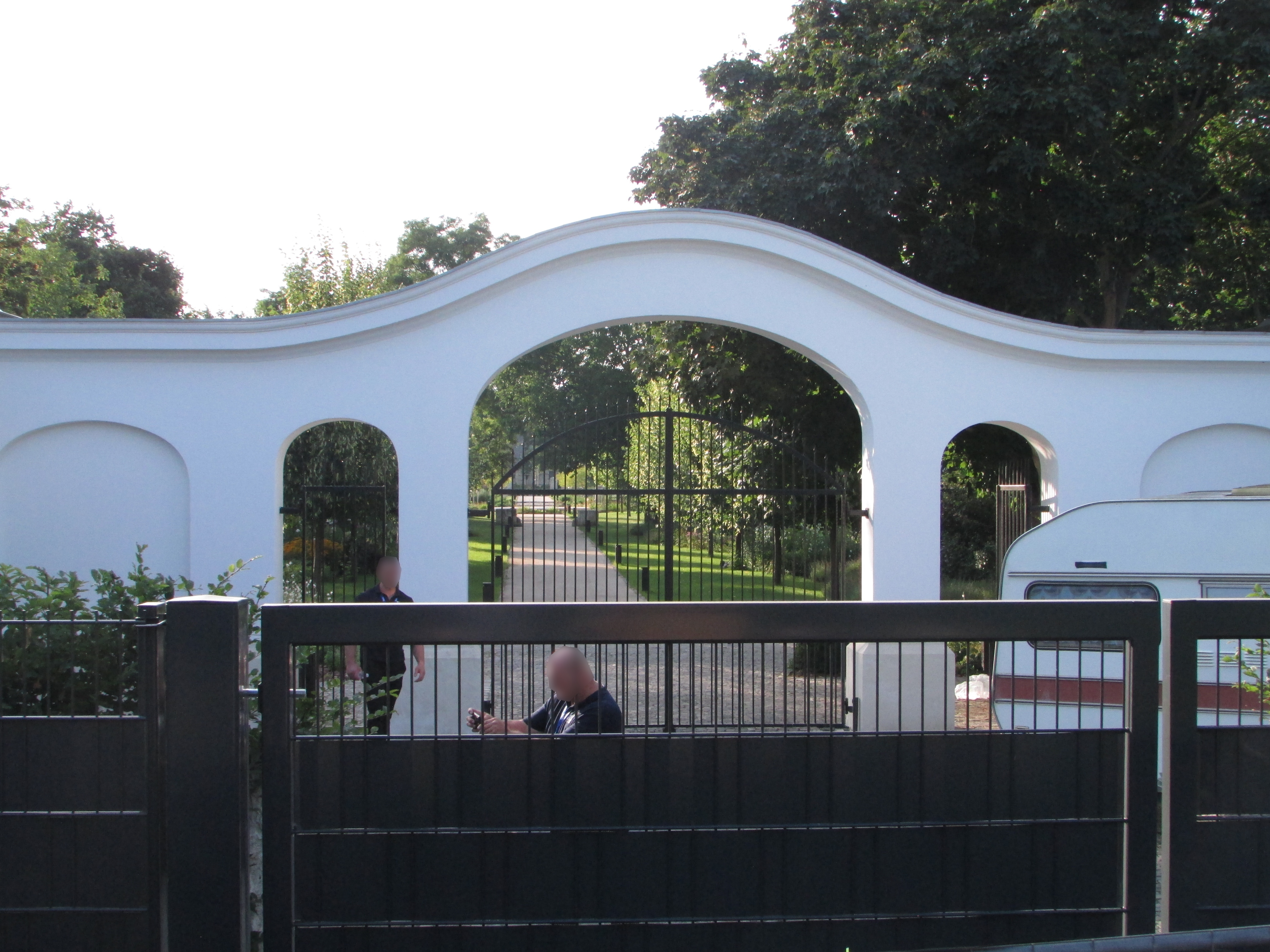
View from the ladder at the entrance

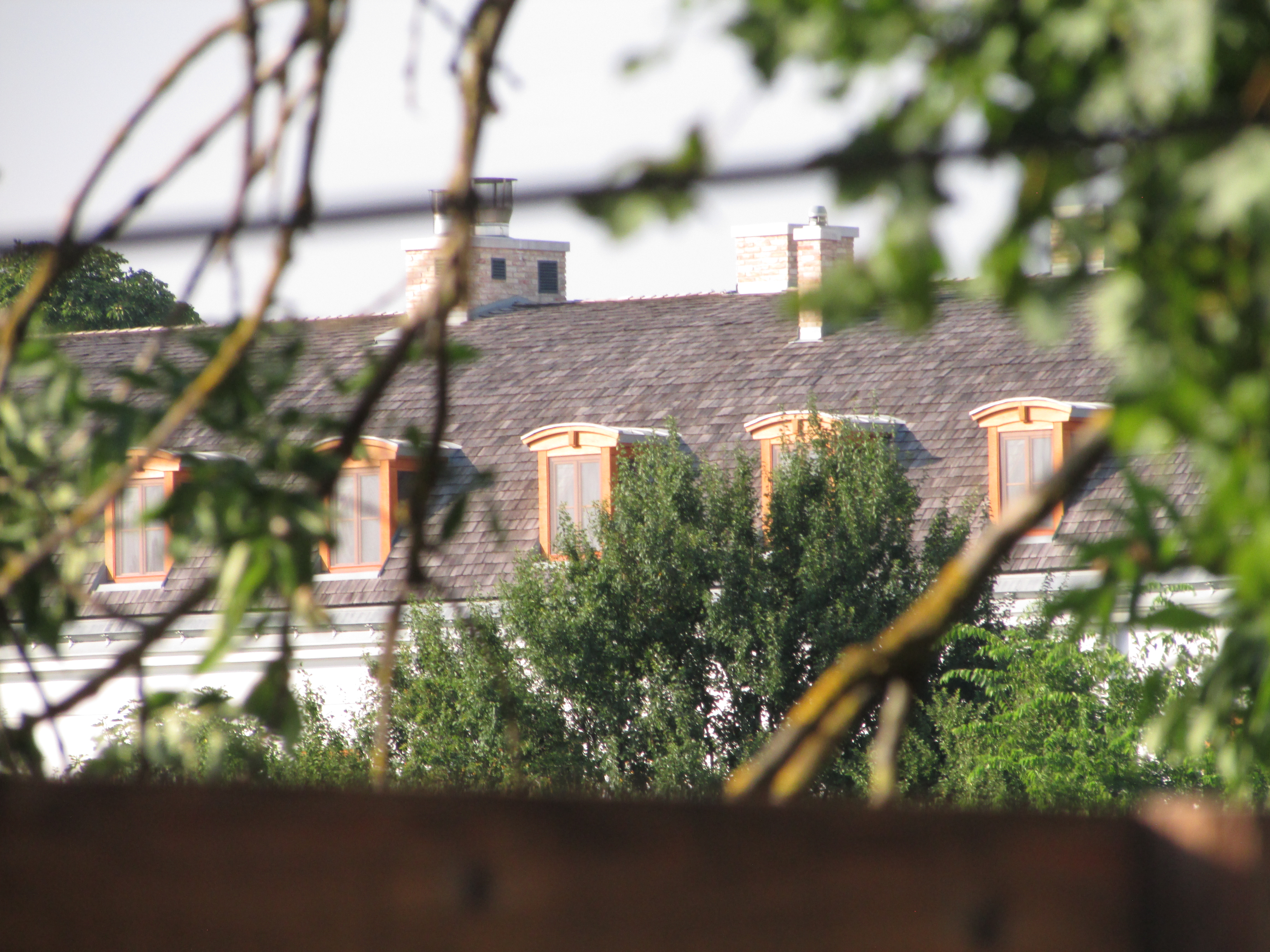
View through the perimeter fence at the buildings

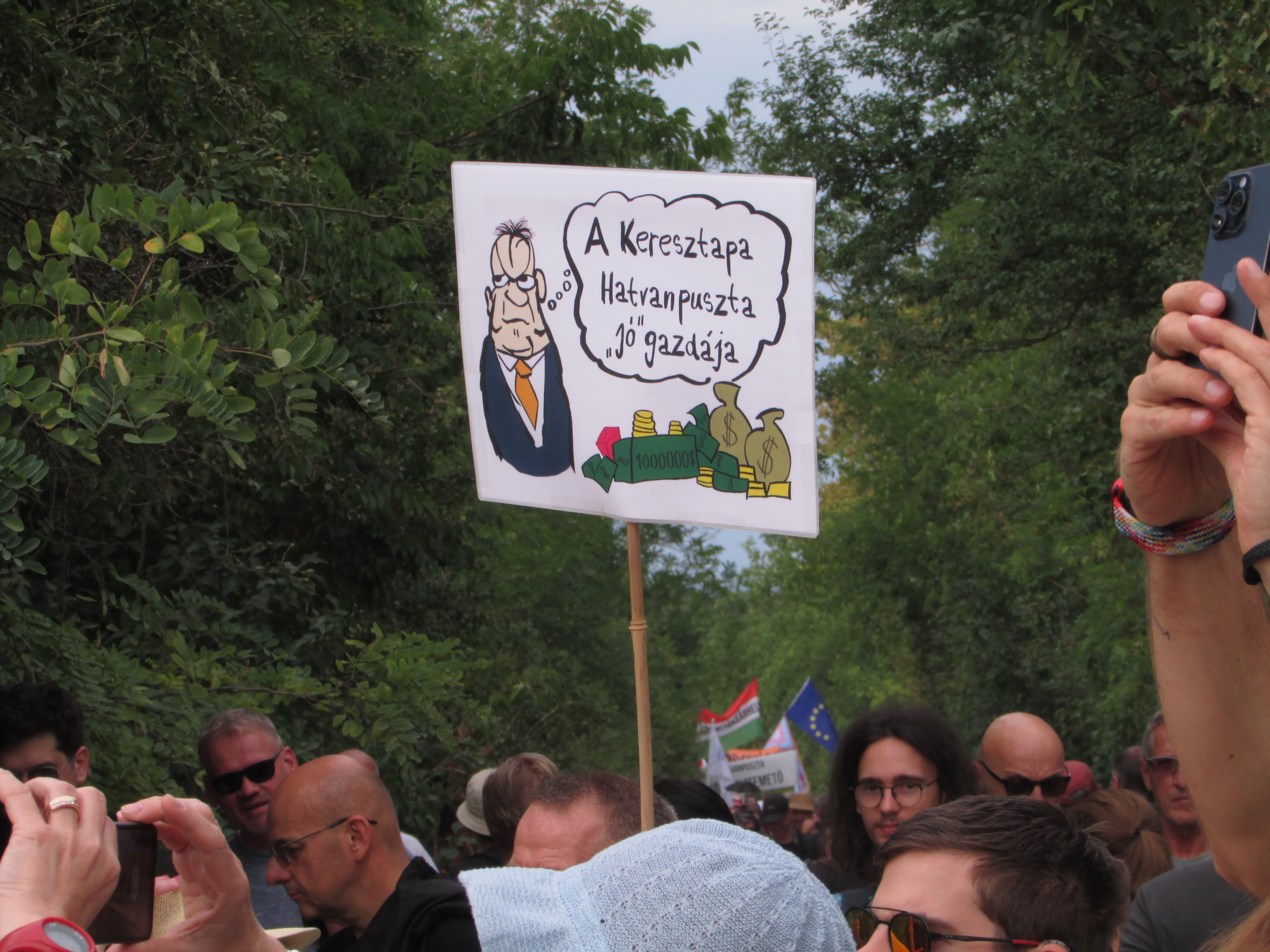
Protest sign at the Hatvanpuszta protests

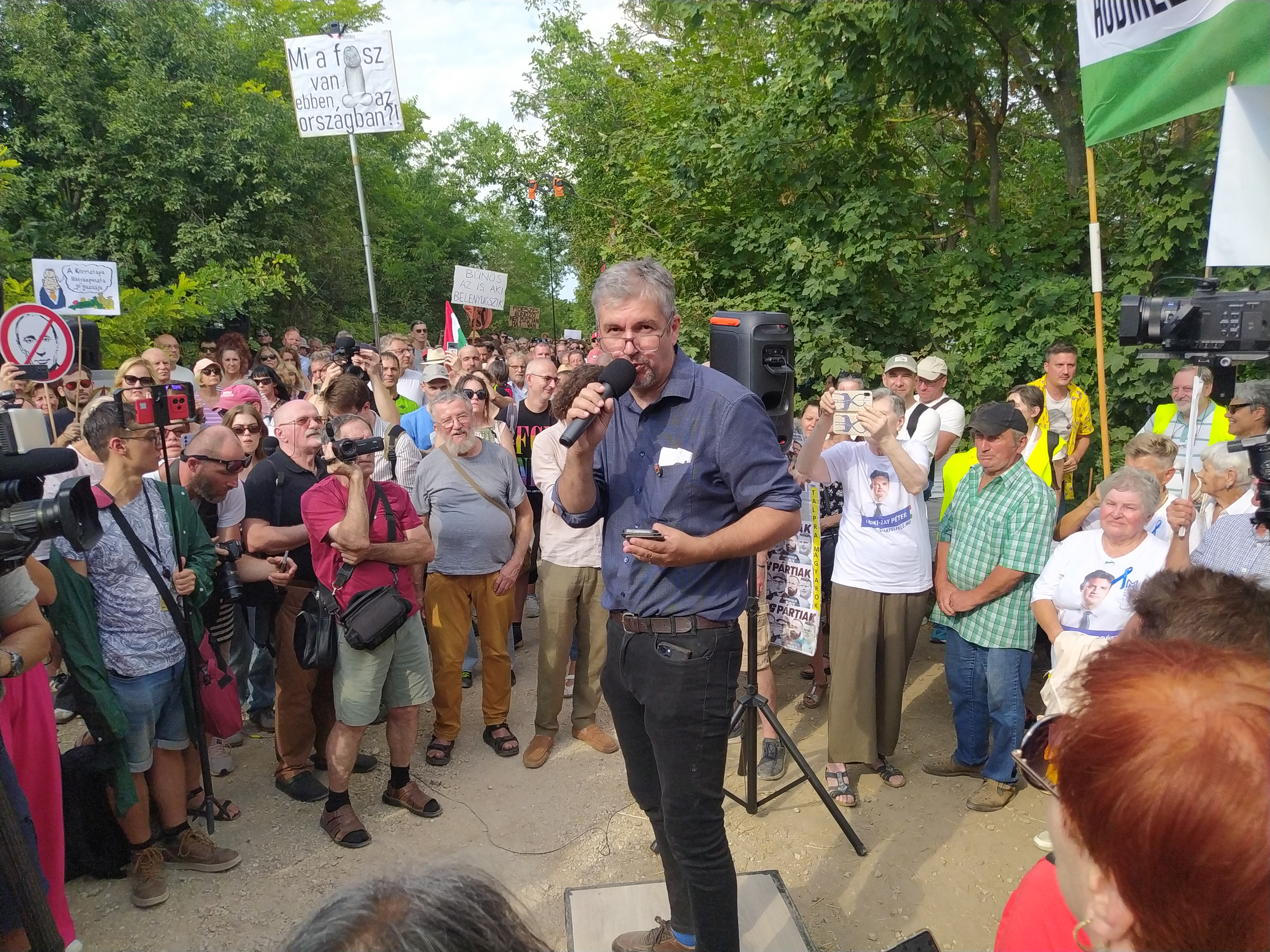
Speech by Ákos Hadházy

=== September and October 2025 ===
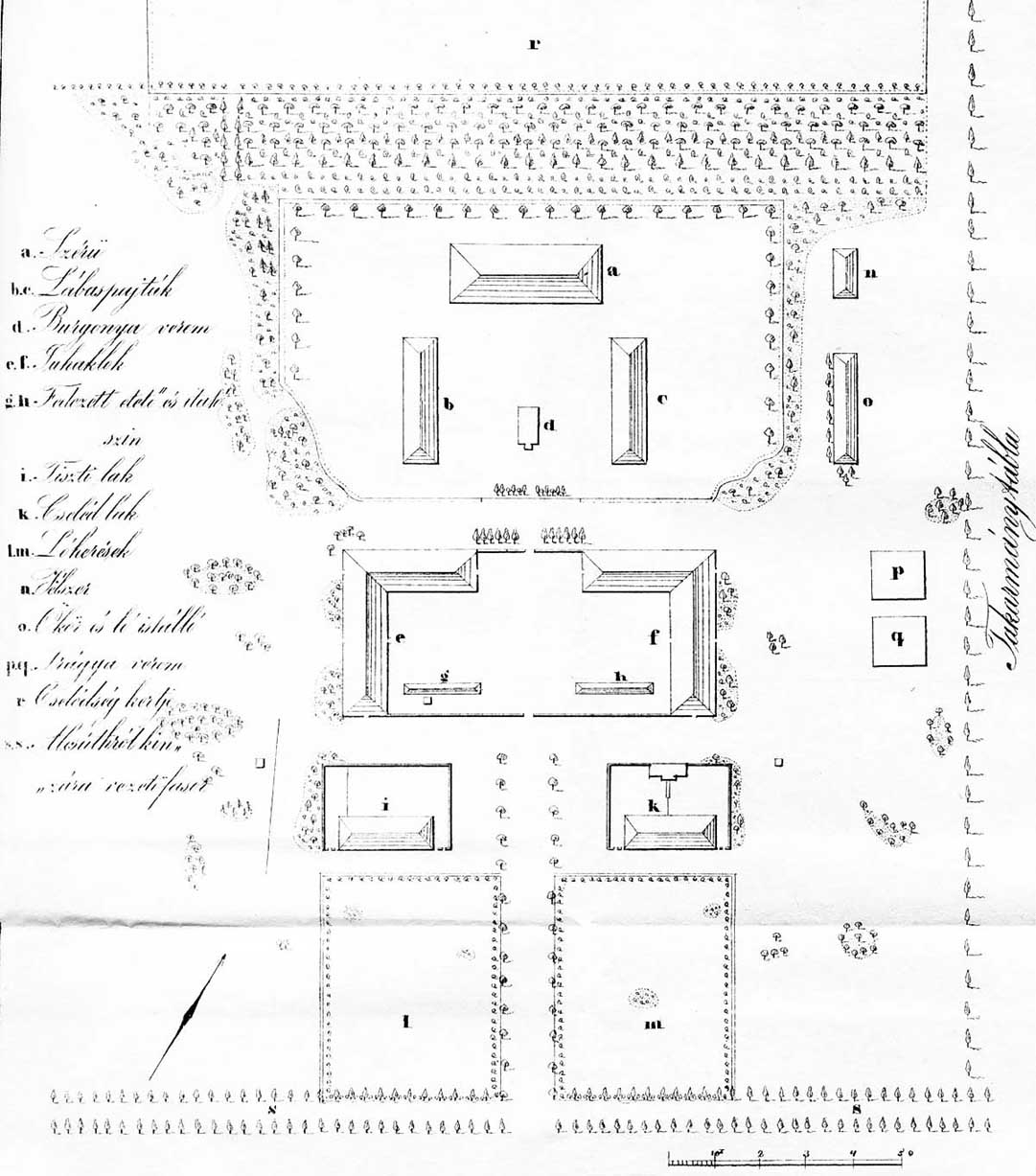
19th-century plan of the Hatvanpuszta estate. The Granary (a) stands at the northern end of the ensemble. Sheepfold I (e) was reconstructed as a guest house, and Sheepfold II (f) adapted as a workshop building. The officers' house (i) serves as the principal residence, while the servants' house (k) has been remodelled to accommodate the library.

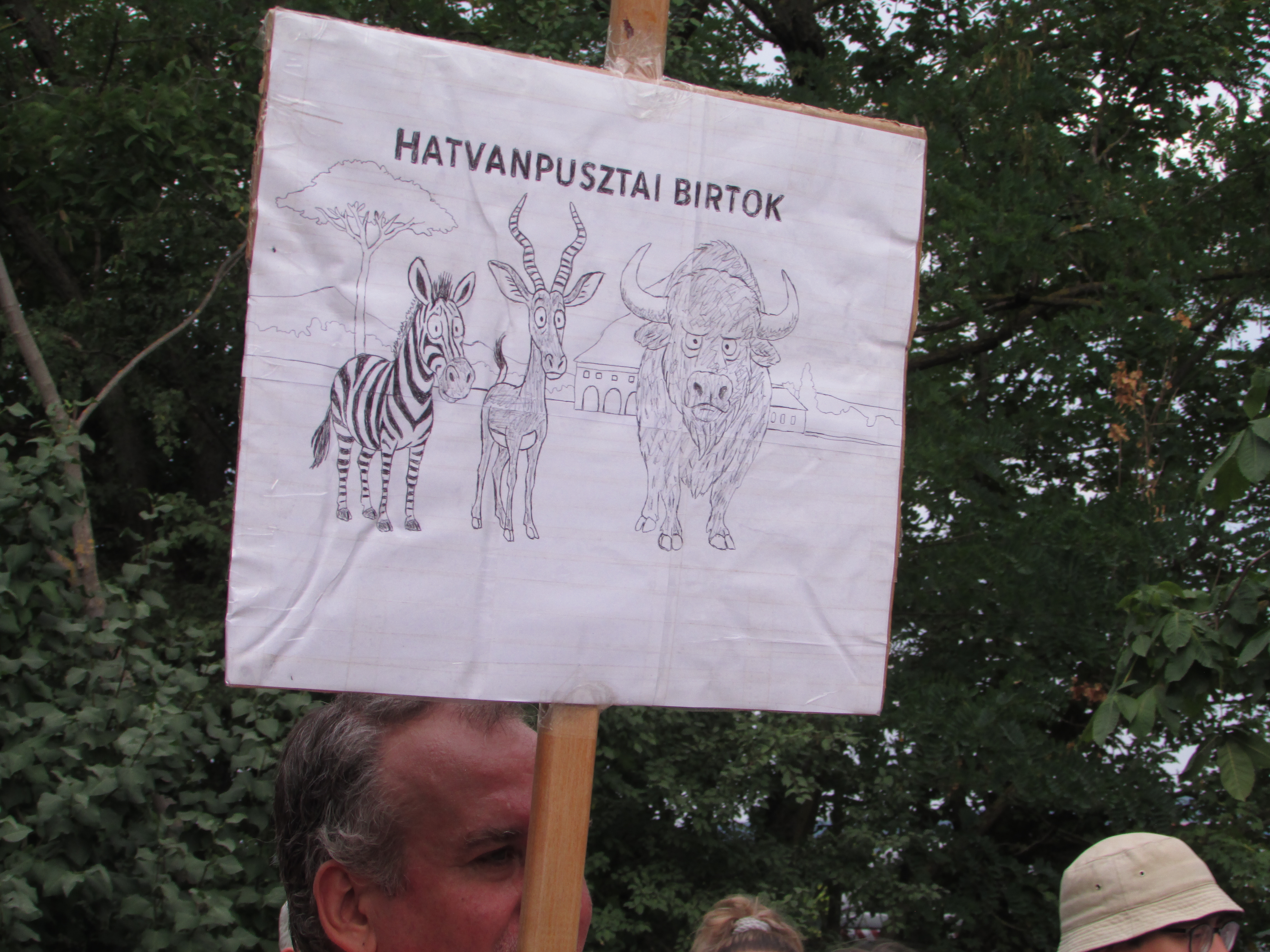
Animals drawn on Protester's sign

After the 2025 Kötcse picnic, Viktor Orbán gave an interview to ÖT.hu, in which he reiterated that he personally had no connection to the Hatvanpuszta estate, stating that his wife occasionally helps his father on the property. He also mentioned Ákos Hadházy, saying that the independent MP "owes his political career to me, since I 'give him work' by allowing him to attack me continuously." On 9 September 2025, Hadházy announced in a Facebook post that he had filed a criminal complaint over the demolition of two protected historic stables at Hatvanpuszta. The police rejected the complaint within three days. Hadházy then submitted an appeal to the public prosecutor's office, which was likewise dismissed. According to the Bicske District Prosecutor's Office, no crime had been committed, as the monument-listed stables had been rebuilt with official authorization from the Government Office of Fejér County. Hadházy subsequently challenged that administrative decision. Following the success of his first "safari," Hadházy organized another public "excursion" to Hatvanpuszta on 27 September 2025, joined by publicist Róbert Puzsér, who acted as a co-guide. Reports stated that visitors briefly saw zebras before the motorized guards drove them away.

After this second event, it became public that Beatrix Mészáros, the registered owner of the land section in front of the animals' enclosure, had submitted a request for that stretch of road to be closed to public traffic.

In October 2025, Győző Orbán filed a criminal complaint against Ákos Hadházy, alleging misuse of personal data and requesting that he no longer posts. Hadházy replied that this amounted to an admission that the blueprints, photographs, and videos he had posted online were genuine.

During a peace march in Budapest in October 2025, Viktor Orbán's mother, Erzsébet Sipos, stated in an interview that there were no zebras at the Hatvanpuszta estate. However, official records from the local government indicate that the necessary permits for keeping such animals within Hatvanpuszta had been granted.

==== Analysis of blueprints and photographs of Hatvanpuszta released by Ákos Hadházy ====
According to an analysis published by Válasz Online in September 2025, based on documents, photos and plans released by independent MP Ákos Hadházy and the assessment of an architectural expert, the Hatvanpuszta complex has been rebuilt as a large, integrated residence and events venue rather than a working farm. Hadházy subsequently challenged that administrative decision. The article states that two listed sheepfolds were demolished and replaced by new, multi-storey buildings of modern construction, while the granary survives and the former officers' and servants' houses were heavily altered. It further claims that extensive underground works (basements, garages and tunnels) now link major buildings.

The expert assessment cited by Válasz Online notes multiple changes from approved drawings, enlarged openings for under-lit interiors, and a programme oriented to reception, accommodation and catering (e.g., a 300-meal production kitchen, a 344 m^{2} hall, club rooms and numerous apartments). It argues that the use of monument status and "farm" classification allowed a project that would otherwise have conflicted with local zoning rules (HÉSZ), a point disputed by authorities in other contexts.

Configuration (as described by Válasz Online / Hadházy):

- Four principal buildings, partly interconnected underground: a residence (~850 m^{2}, ex-officers' house), a library (~700 m², ex-servants' house), a guest house (~2,200 m^{2}, on the site of Sheepfold I) and a workshop building (~2,850 m^{2}, on the site of Sheepfold II).
- The guest house contains large reception spaces (including a ~344 m^{2} dining/salon), multiple club rooms and several apartments; it connects to the residence via an underground corridor and service areas (stores/garages).
- The "workshop" reportedly includes fruit-processing and a pálinka-distilling suite arranged with showroom/catering functions, plus additional staff and guest apartments.
- Site landscaping follows a formal, axial layout; two outdoor pools and security infrastructure are present.

The article characterizes the overall result as a representational residential compound assembled within the footprint of the former model farm; Hungarian authorities have previously maintained that the works proceeded under valid permits and monument regulations.

=== Dispute over monument status and building demolitions ===
Investigations by Válasz Online and monument expert Péter Bátonyi concluded that two of the three protected buildings at Hatvanpuszta – the L-shaped sheepfolds – were not renovated but completely demolished and replaced with new structures, despite government claims to the contrary. Aerial photographs from 2016–2020 documented the intact state of the original buildings and their subsequent removal, leaving only the historic granary untouched. Although MP Ákos Hadházy filed a complaint for the destruction of protected monuments, authorities rejected it, and critics argue that maintaining monument status for the new buildings serves to preserve the official narrative of "renovation" avoiding acknowledgment of the demolitions and the potential legal or political consequences that might follow.

== See also ==
- Putin's Palace
- Mezhyhirya Residence
- Millerhof
- Palace of Versailles
