= Alcsút Palace =

Historic house in Alcsút, Hungary

Coordinates: 47°25′24″N 18°35′23″E

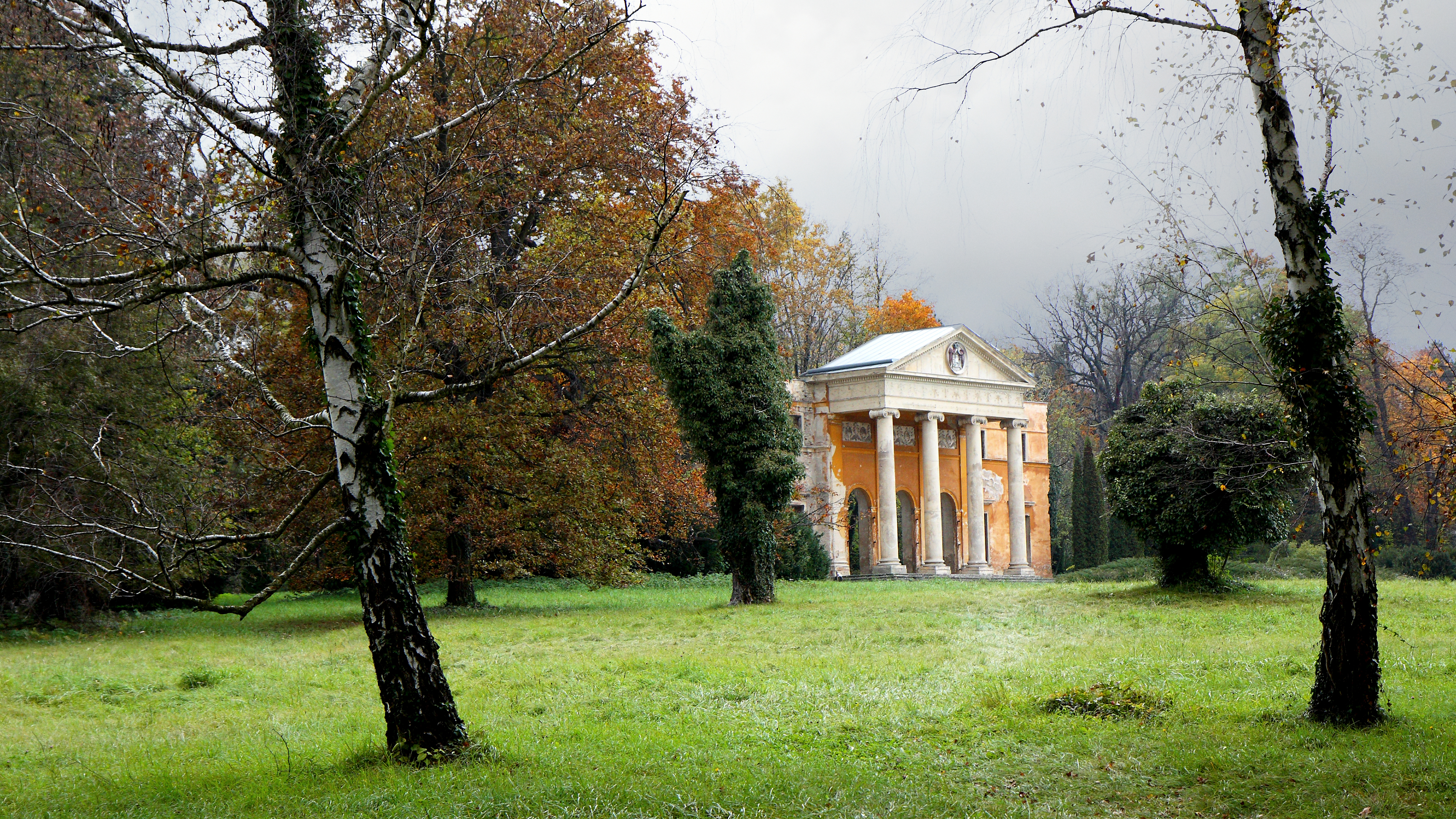
The remains of Alcsút Palace

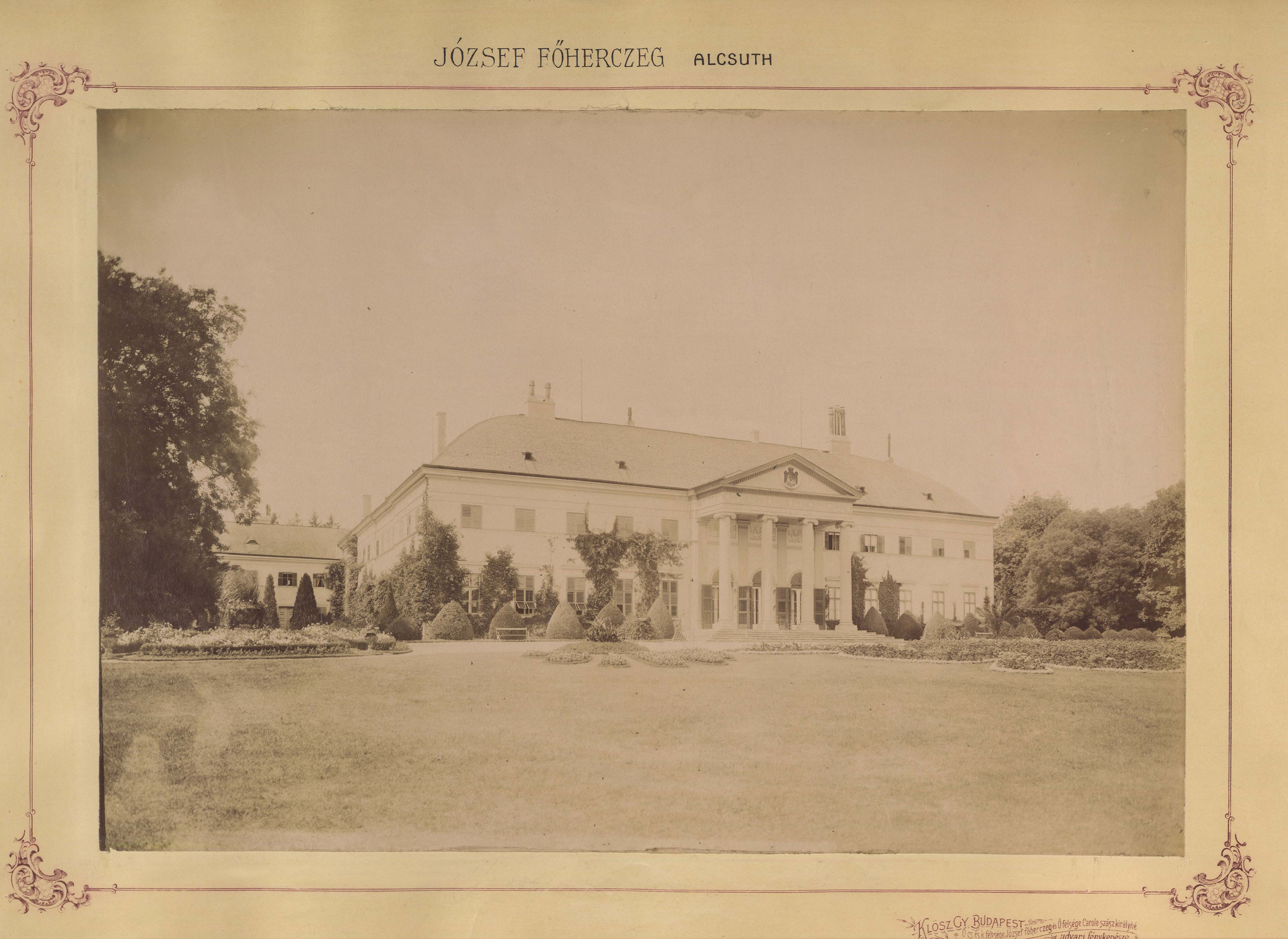
Alcsút Palace in its heyday

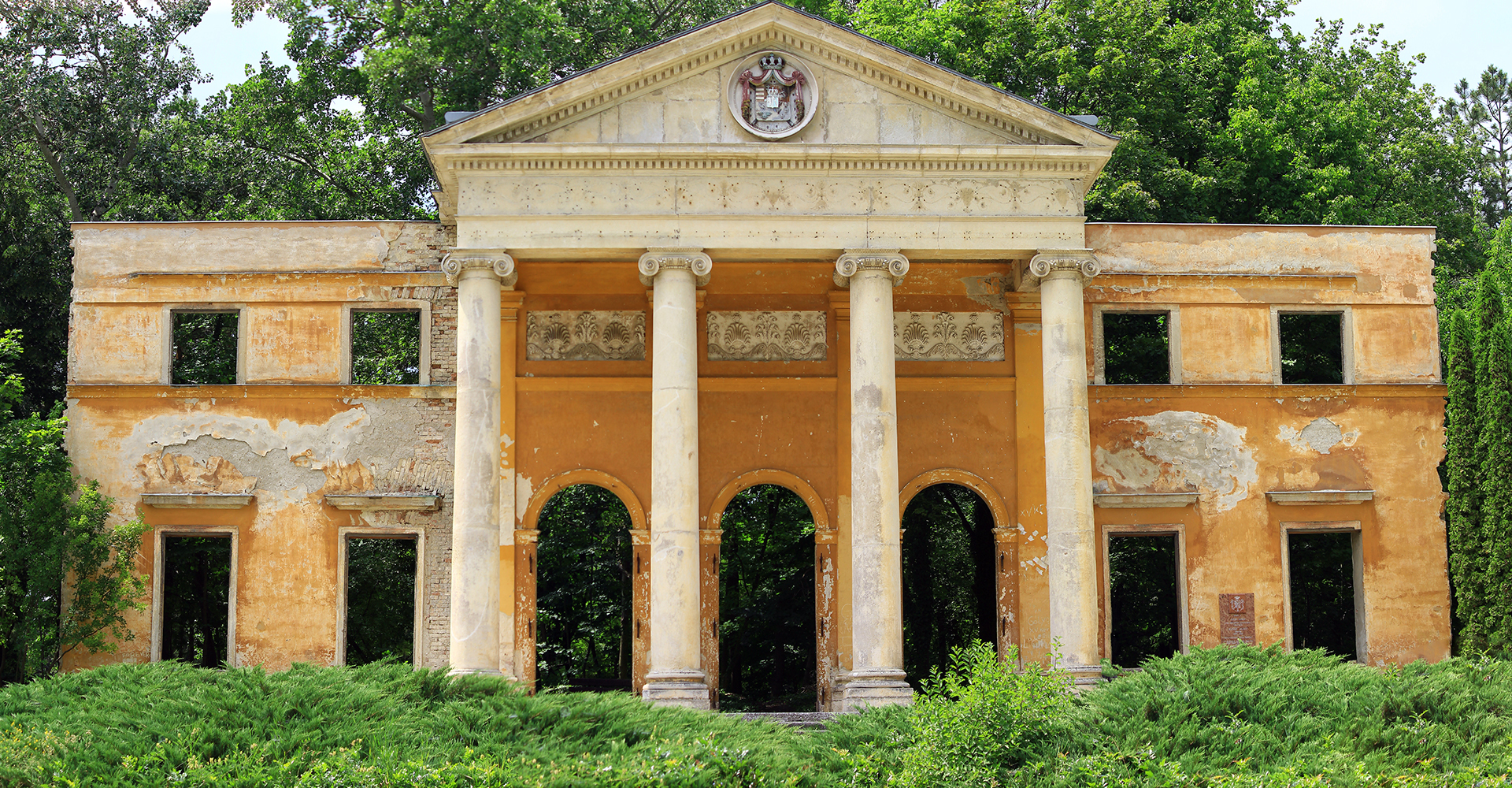
The portico of Alcsút Palace

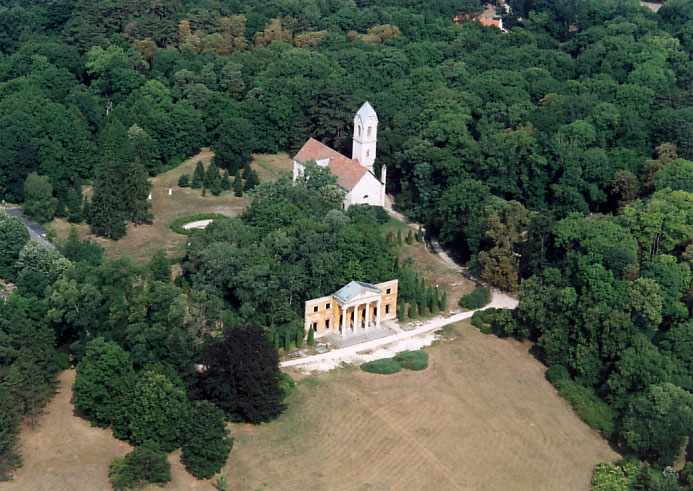
The Alcsút Palace portico and chapel today

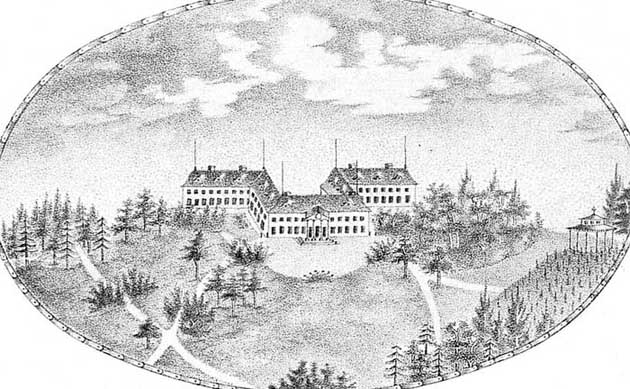
Alcsút Palace in 1832

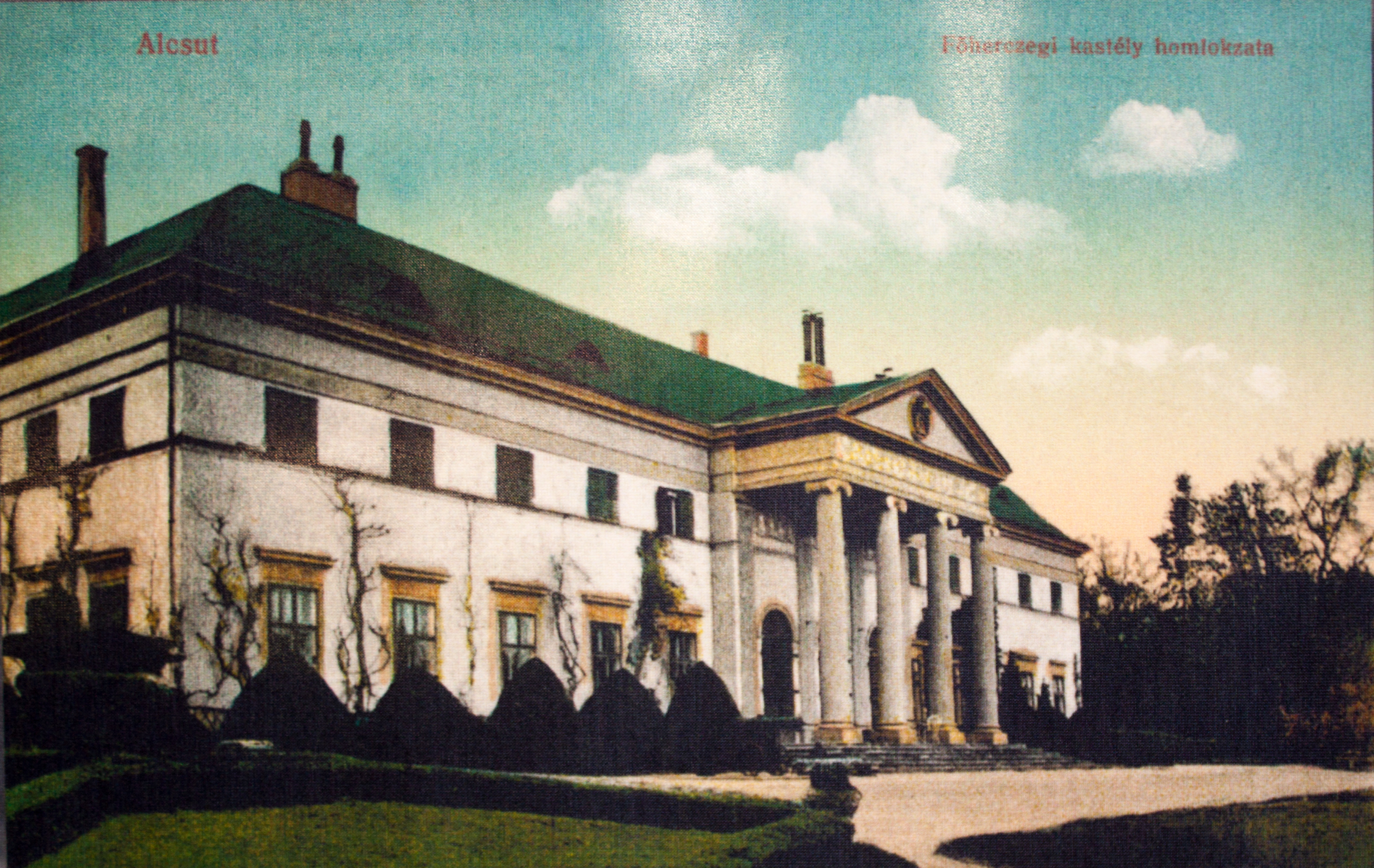
Alcsút Palace before its destruction

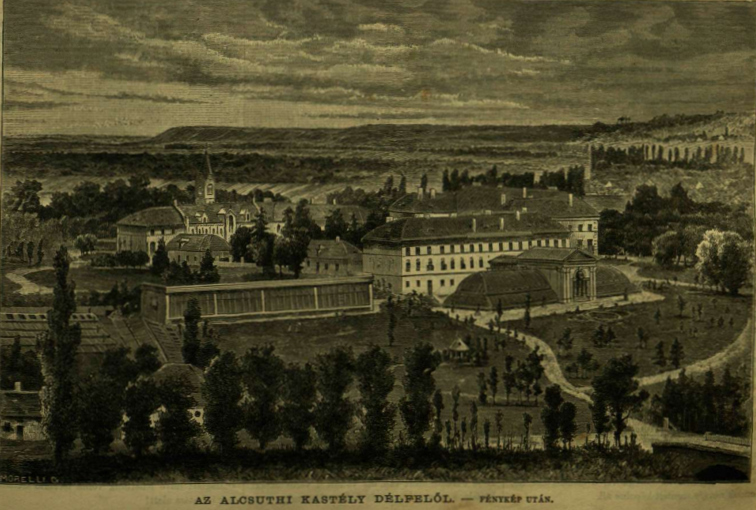
Alcsút Palace with the chapel on the left and the palm house on the right

Alcsút Palace (Hungarian: Alcsúti kastély, German: Schloss Altschutt) a former country house located in Alcsút, Hungary. It was the country estate of the Hungarian branch of the House of Habsburg-Lorraine.

== History ==
On 20 September 1795, Holy Roman Emperor Francis II appointed his younger brother Archduke Joseph of Austria as governor of Hungary. A year later, the Diet of Hungary elected him as Palatine of Hungary in Pressburg (Bratislava). As a result, he became the first member of the Hungarian or Palatinal branch of the House of Habsburg-Lorraine.

Between 1819 and 1827, Palatine Joseph built a summer residence in Alcsút according to the plans of the well-known architect Mihály Pollack (1773–1855) in a neoclassical style. The foundation stone for this building was laid on 13 June 1820. Construction work was completed in 1826. However, as it took a full year to furnish the palace, the family was only able to move into their country home in 1827. Archduke Joseph also had the adjoining farm buildings built and set up a model farm here.

Palatine Joseph's son, Archduke Joseph Karl, carried out further extensive conversion and expansion work in the 1870s. He had new wings added, created a courtyard and rebuilt the rear facade of the palace in an eclectic style.

At the end of the Palace’s right-wing, stables were constructed in the neoclassical style. When János Simor, the Hungarian prelate and Archbishop of Esztergom, paid a visit to the palace, he liked these stables so much that he suggested that these stables would also be suitable for a chapel. inspired by these words, Archduke Joseph Karl converted them into a chapel. Architect Ferenc Storno was involved for the reconstruction. The construction took place in 1879 and 1880. Cardinal János Simor consecrated the new chapel in neo-Romanesque style on 27 November 1880. After that, the archive of the Hungarian Habsburgs and a library were realized in the last two large rooms at the end of the right wing.

The last renovation work took place at the start of the 20th century. At that time, the farm was completed as a closed unit. The house was regularly used by the family as a summer residence between 1827 and 1944. Each of the residents, starting with Palatine Joseph, as well as his successors, left their mark on the house. Over the decades, the palace has housed a valuable picture gallery, numerous works of art and furniture from a wide variety of epochs.

Archduchess Clothilde died at the palace in 1927.

The Alcsút palace and estate remained property of the Habsburg family until the end of the Second World War. In 1944, the family was forced to leave the castle. First, the children went to Germany in October 1944. The last owner, Archduke Joseph Francis and his wife, stayed the longest, leaving the palace on 19 December 1944, shortly before the Red Army invaded. On 23 December 1944, the house was occupied by the Red Army. After that, the locals plundered the palace and the valuable inventory was completely lost.

After the Russian occupation of Hungary in 1945, the palace became a Red Army command post. During this time, the main house caught fire and burned out completely, with the valuable family archive also being burned. With the knowledge of the then communist authorities, the local residents stole the usable building material from the ruins in the second half of the 1940s.

In February 1951, the entire palace ruin was demolished, with the exception of the main facade, which is still visible today. Only the entrance (portico) decorated with columns has survived from the palace remains. The palace chapel is a separate building and was also badly damaged. Restoration work only started thirty years later, but it was carried out unprofessionally. A lot of what could have been saved was lost as a result.

The former model farm Hatvanpuszta of the estate is now owned by the family of Viktor Orbán, Hungary’s former Prime Minister.

== Garden ==
Archduke Joseph laid out the park in English landscape garden style in 1825 and it can still be visited today. In the park, the Palatine created an arboretum with more than 300 different rare plants. In the 1840s, the court gardener Emil Fuchs (1830-1896) came to Alcsút and designed the park in the form it can still be seen today.

Archduke Joseph Karl worked on the plants in the arboretum scientifically and published the results in the book ‘’Arborethum Alcsuthiense (Katalog der in Alcsuter Garten gepflanzten Bäume un Sträucher)’’, which was published in Kolozsvár in 1892.

In the years 1871-1872 a 56-meter-long palm house was built - according to plans by Miklós Ybl - in which rare plants were stored. The park has an area of 40.5 hectares. About 540 species of trees are cultivated here.

Alcsút Gardens are famous about the 2.5 hectare large Mediterranean snowdrop field which is a popular tourist attraction in late February and early March when the flowers are in full bloom. Six non-native species of snowdrops were introduced to the park in the 19th century: Galanthus plicatus (the most numerous in the garden), Galanthus elwesii, Galanthus gracilis, Galanthus woronowii and Galanthus fosteri. Several hybrids are also observed. The native species, Galanthus nivalis occurs naturally in other areas of the garden.

== Literature ==
- Károly Örsi (1992). "Der Schloßpark von Alcsút (Alcsútdoboz)". Die Gartenkunst (in German). 4: 55–67.
- Lakat Erika (2002). Az alcsúti Habsburg-kastély tündöklése és pusztulása (in Hungarian). Székesfehérvár: Szent István Király Múzeum. p. 44. ISBN 963-927-923-4.
- Sisa, József (2008). "József nádor alcsúti kastélya". In István Feld, Selysette Somorjai (ed.). Kastélyok évszázadai, évszázadok kastélyai (PDF) (in Hungarian). Budapest: Castrum Bene Egyesület. pp. 265–282. ISBN 978-9638725974.
