= Archduke Ladislaus Philipp of Austria =

Austrian Archduke (1875–1895)

Archduke László Philipp
- Archduke of Austria, Royal prince of Hungary and Bohemia
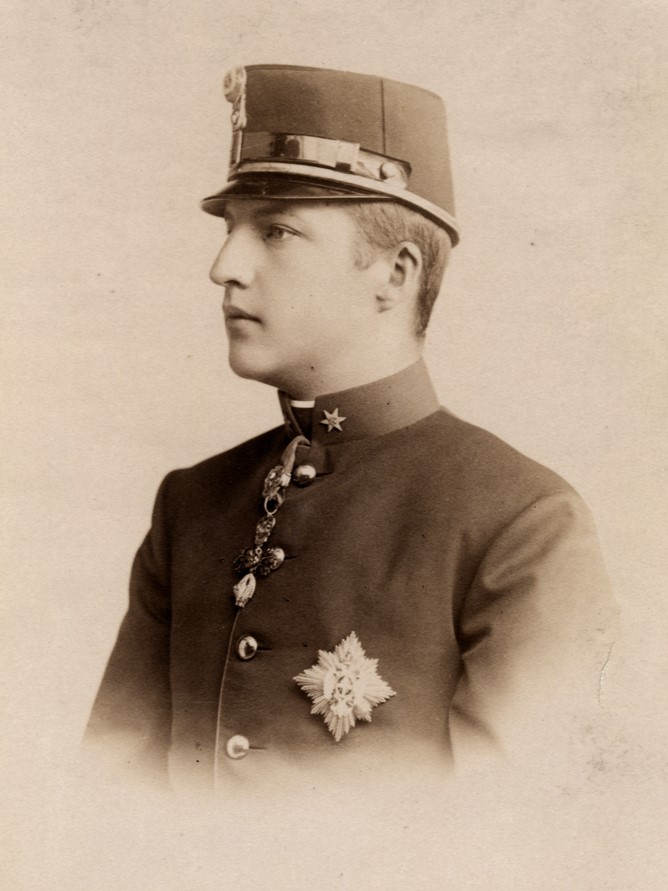
- Ladislaus Philipp in 1895
- Born: 16 July 1875; Alcsútdoboz, Austria-Hungary
- Died: 6 September 1895 (aged 20); Budapest, Austria-Hungary
Names
- László Philipp Marie Vincent Ladislaus
- House: Habsburg-Lorraine
- Father: Archduke Joseph Karl of Austria
- Mother: Princess Clotilde of Saxe-Coburg and Gotha

Archduke László Philipp Marie Vincent Ladislaus of Austria (16 July 1875 – 6 September 1895) was a member of House of Habsburg as the second son of Archduke Joseph Karl of Austria and an officer of the Austro-Hungarian Army.

== Early life and ancestry ==
Archduke László Philipp or Lasdislaus Philipp was born on 16 July 1875 as the fifth child and younger son of Archduke Joseph Karl of Austria and Princess Clotilde of Saxe-Coburg and Gotha. By birth, he was a member of the Hungarian line of the reigning House of Habsburg, which ruled as Palatines of Hungary.

Monarchical styles of Archduke Ladislaus Philipp of Austria
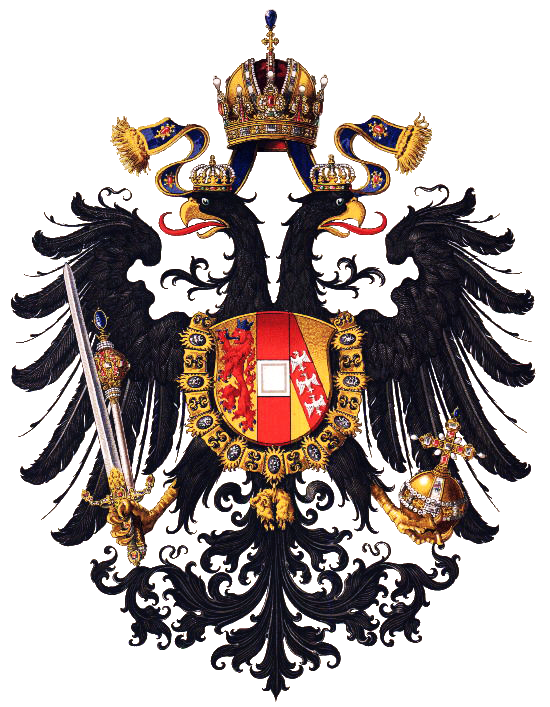
- Reference style: His Imperial and Royal Highness
- Spoken style: Your Imperial and Royal Highness

== Military career ==
He entered the military as a Lieutenant of Ungarischen Infanterie Regiment Nr. 6. Major Heinrich Himmel von Agisburg received him as a Lieutenant. He was redeployed to Ungarische Infanterie Regiment "Duke Joseph“ Nr. 37.

Lasdislaus Philipp was awarded the Grand Cross of the Order of the White Eagle and became a knight of Order of the Golden Fleece.

== Death ==
In 1895, Lasdislaus Philipp was accidentally shot in while hunting with Stuart Marek and died in Budapest on 6 September 1895, at the age of 20. His body was buried in the crypt of the Royal Palais, Budapest, Hungary.

== Ancestry ==
Ancestors of Archduke Ladislaus Philipp of Austria

8. Leopold II, Holy Roman Emperor
4. Archduke Joseph, Palatine of Hungary
9. Infanta Maria Luisa of Spain
2. Archduke Joseph Karl, Palatine of Hungary
10. Duke Louis of Württemberg
5. Duchess Maria Dorothea of Württemberg
11. Princess Henriette of Nassau-Weilburg
1. Archduke Ladislaus Philipp of Austria
12. Prince Ferdinand of Saxe-Coburg and Gotha
6. Prince August of Saxe-Coburg and Gotha
13. Princess Maria Antonia Koháry of Csábrág and Szitnya
3. Princess Clotilde of Saxe-Coburg and Gotha
14. Louis Philippe I of France
7. Princess Clémentine of Orléans
15. Princess Maria Amalia of Naples and Sicily
