= Archduke Joseph Karl of Austria =

Austrian royal; Palatine of Hungary

Archduke Joseph Karl
- Palatine of Hungary (titular)
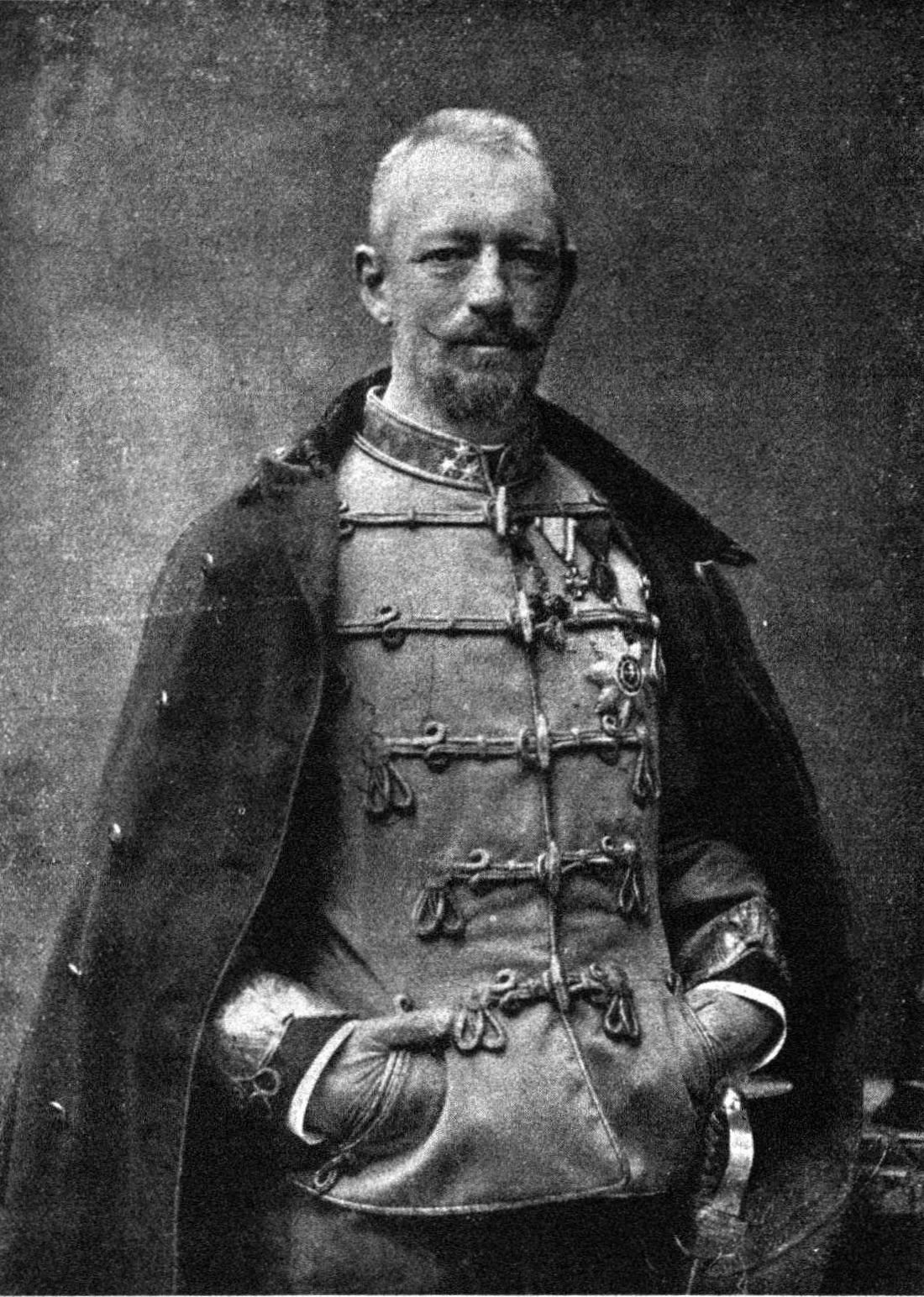
- Portrait by Károly Koller
- Born: 2 March 1833; Pressburg, Kingdom of Hungary
- Died: 13 June 1905 (aged 72); Fiume, Austria-Hungary
- Burial: Palatinal Crypt
- Spouse: Princess Clotilde of Saxe-Coburg and Gotha (m. 1864)
- Issue Detail: Archduchess Elisabeth Klementine; Maria Dorothea, Duchess of Orléans; Margarethe Klementine, Princess of Thurn and Taxis; Archduke Joseph August; Archduke Ladislaus Philipp; Archduchess Elisabeth Henriette; Archduchess Klothilde Maria
Names
- Josef Karl Ludwig
- House: Habsburg-Lorraine
- Father: Archduke Joseph, Palatine of Hungary
- Mother: Duchess Maria Dorothea of Württemberg

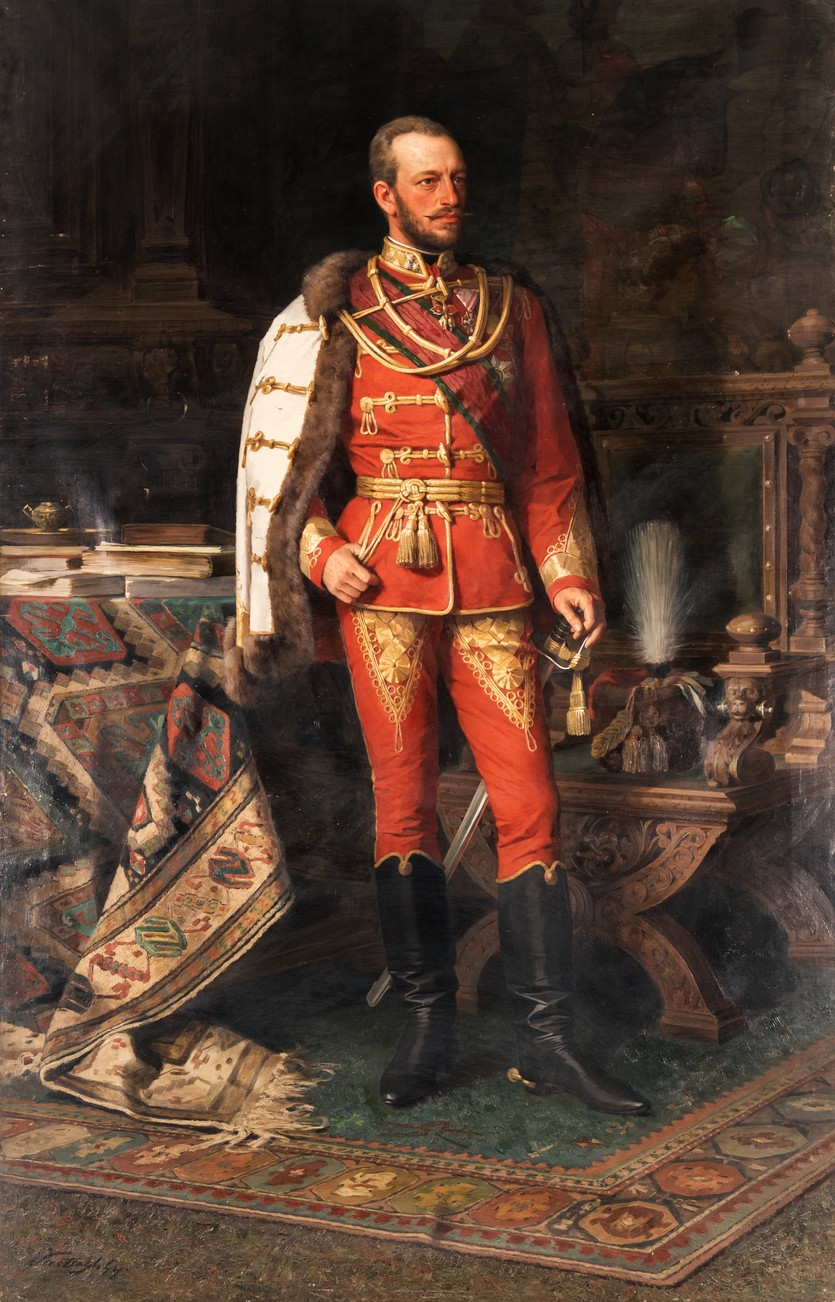
Portrait by György Vastagh (1881)

Archduke Joseph Karl of Austria (German: (Erzherzog) Josef Karl (Ludwig) von Österreich, Hungarian: Habsburg–Lotaringiai József Károly (Lajos) főherceg; 2 March 1833 – 13 June 1905) was a member of the House of Habsburg-Lorraine. He was the second son of Archduke Joseph, Palatine of Hungary (seventh son of Leopold II, Holy Roman Emperor) and Duchess Maria Dorothea of Württemberg.

== Biography ==
Monarchical styles of Archduke Joseph Karl of Austria
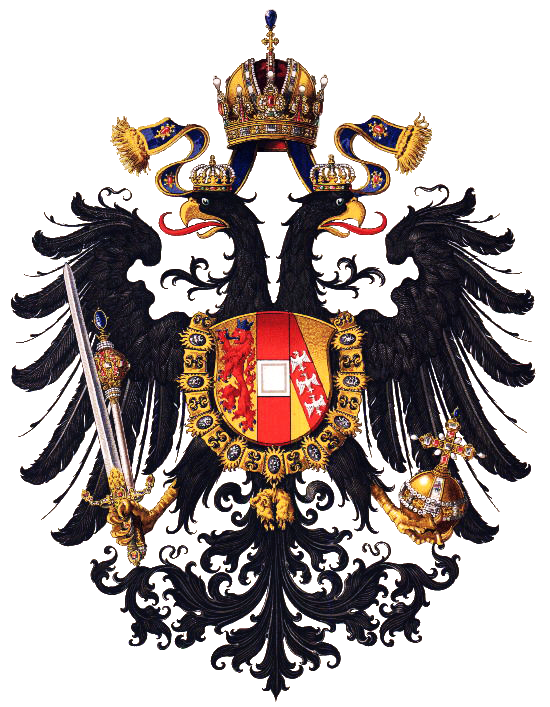
- Reference style: His Imperial and Royal Highness
- Spoken style: Your Imperial and Royal Highness

Like many junior members of royal families, Archduke Joseph Karl entered the military. He became a Major General in the Austrian Army in 1860. During the Austro-Prussian War he commanded a Brigade in the North Army and had three horses shot under him at Königgrätz. In 1867, he became Palatine of Hungary after the death of his childless half-brother Stephen, though the post by that time was symbolic only.

The archduke had an interest in the Romani language and occasionally wrote on this topic to Albert Thomas Sinclair, an American lawyer who shared this interest. A biography of Sinclair notes that the archduke sent a copy of his work, "a large octavo volume handsomely bound. It is a most important and valuable philological work comparing the gypsy words with Sanskrit, Hindustani Persian, etc".

As early as the late 1880s, Archduke Joseph advocated turning the poor fishing village of Crikvenica into a new health resort. In 1895 the Grand Hotel named after the archduke was opened there.

His residence was the Archduke Joseph's Palace in Budapest.

== Marriage and issue ==
On 12 May 1864 in Coburg, Archduke Joseph married Princess Clotilde of Saxe-Coburg and Gotha (1846–1927), the elder daughter of Prince August of Saxe-Coburg and Gotha and Princess Clémentine of Orléans. They had seven children :

- Archduchess Elisabeth Klementine Klothilde Maria Amalie (18 March 1865 – 7 January 1866)
- Archduchess Maria Dorothea Amalie (14 June 1867 – 6 April 1932)
- Archduchess Margarethe Klementine Maria (6 July 1870 – 2 May 1955)
- Archduke Joseph August Viktor Klemens Maria (9 August 1872 – 6 July 1962)
- Archduke Ladislaus Philipp (16 July 1875 – 6 September 1895), no issue
- Archduchess Elisabeth Henriette Klothilde Maria Viktoria (9 March 1883 – 8 February 1958), married Zoltán Decleva, Hungarian Army Commander in WWII.
- Archduchess Klothilde Maria Amalie Philomena Raineria (9 May 1884 – 14 December 1903), no issue.

== Honours and awards ==
He received the following orders and decorations:

- Austrian Empire:
  - Knight of the Golden Fleece, 1852
  - Grand Cross of the Royal Hungarian Order St. Stephen, 1871
  - Military Merit Cross, in Diamonds
  - Military Merit Medal on Red Ribbon
- Kingdom of Prussia:
  - Knight of the Black Eagle, 4 June 1853
  - Knight of the Red Eagle, 1st Class
- Oldenburg: Grand Cross of the Order of Duke Peter Friedrich Ludwig, with Golden Crown, 13 September 1855
- Belgium: Grand Cordon of the Order of Leopold (civil), 2 May 1857
- (Saxe-Coburg and Gotha) (Duchy of Saxe-Altenburg) (Saxe-Meiningen) Ernestine duchies: Grand Cross of the Saxe-Ernestine House Order, May 1857
- Kingdom of Hanover:
  - Knight of St. George, 1857
  - Grand Cross of the Royal Guelphic Order, 1857
- Nassau: Knight of the Gold Lion of Nassau, November 1858
- Saxe-Weimar-Eisenach: Grand Cross of the White Falcon, 12 December 1858
- Kingdom of Bavaria: Knight of St. Hubert, 1860
- Grand Duchy of Hesse: Grand Cross of the Ludwig Order, 24 May 1863
- Württemberg: Grand Cross of the Württemberg Crown, 1872
- Principality of Bulgaria: Grand Cross of St. Alexander
- Persian Empire: Order of the August Portrait, in Diamonds
- Kingdom of Portugal: Grand Cross of the Tower and Sword
- Kingdom of Romania: Grand Cross of the Star of Romania
- Russian Empire:
  - Knight of St. Andrew
  - Knight of St. Alexander Nevsky
  - Knight of the White Eagle
  - Knight of St. Anna, 1st Class
- Principality of Serbia:
  - Grand Cross of the Cross of Takovo
  - Grand Cross of the White Eagle
- Grand Duchy of Tuscany: Grand Cross of St. Joseph

== Ancestry ==
Ancestors of Archduke Joseph Karl of Austria

8. Francis I, Holy Roman Emperor
4. Leopold II, Holy Roman Emperor
9. Maria Theresa of Austria
2. Archduke Joseph, Palatine of Hungary
10. Charles III of Spain
5. Infanta Maria Luisa of Spain
11. Princess Maria Amalia of Saxony
1. Archduke Joseph Karl, Palatine of Hungary
12. Frederick II Eugene, Duke of Württemberg
6. Duke Louis of Württemberg
13. Princess Friederike of Brandenburg-Schwedt
3. Duchess Maria Dorothea of Württemberg
14. Charles Christian, Prince of Nassau-Weilburg
7. Princess Henriette of Nassau-Weilburg
15. Princess Carolina of Orange-Nassau
