= Alcsútdoboz =

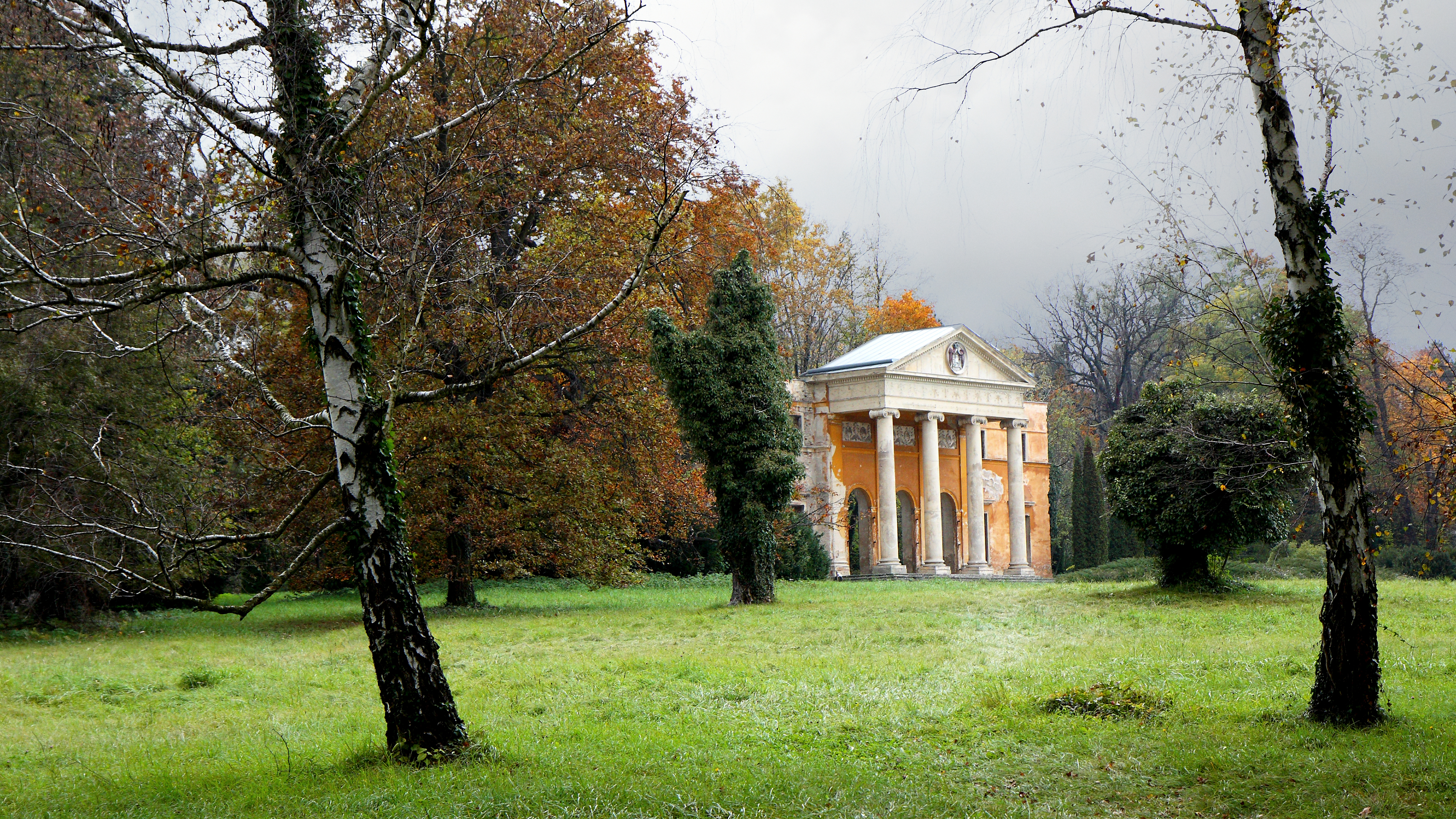
- Ruins of the destroyed Habsburg palace

- Location of Alcsútdoboz in Hungary
- Coordinates: 47.4258°N 18.6026°E
- Country: Hungary
- Region: Central Transdanubia
- County: Fejér

Area
  - Total: 50.71 km^{2} (19.58 sq mi)

Population (2017)
  - Total: 1,427
  - Density: 28.14/km^{2} (72.88/sq mi)
- Time zone: UTC+1 (CET)
  - Summer (DST): UTC+2 (CEST)
- Postal code: 8087
- Area code: +36 22
- Website: https://alcsutdoboz.hu/

Alcsútdoboz is a village in Fejér county, Hungary. Alcsútdoboz was created in 1950 by the merger of the municipalities of Alcsút (German: Altschutt) and Vértesdoboz.

== History ==
Archduke Joseph, Palatine of Hungary had his country estate Alcsút Palace there. It was constructed by the renowned architect Mihály Pollack. It was destroyed during World War II, with only the portico remaining.

Archduke Joseph August of Austria, who was for a short period head of state of Hungary, was born in Alcsút.

Former Hungarian Prime Minister Viktor Orbán was raised in Alcsútdoboz. His family owns nowadays the Hatvanpuszta manor house.
