= Prince Nikolaus of Thurn and Taxis (1885–1919) =

- Baron of Hochstadt
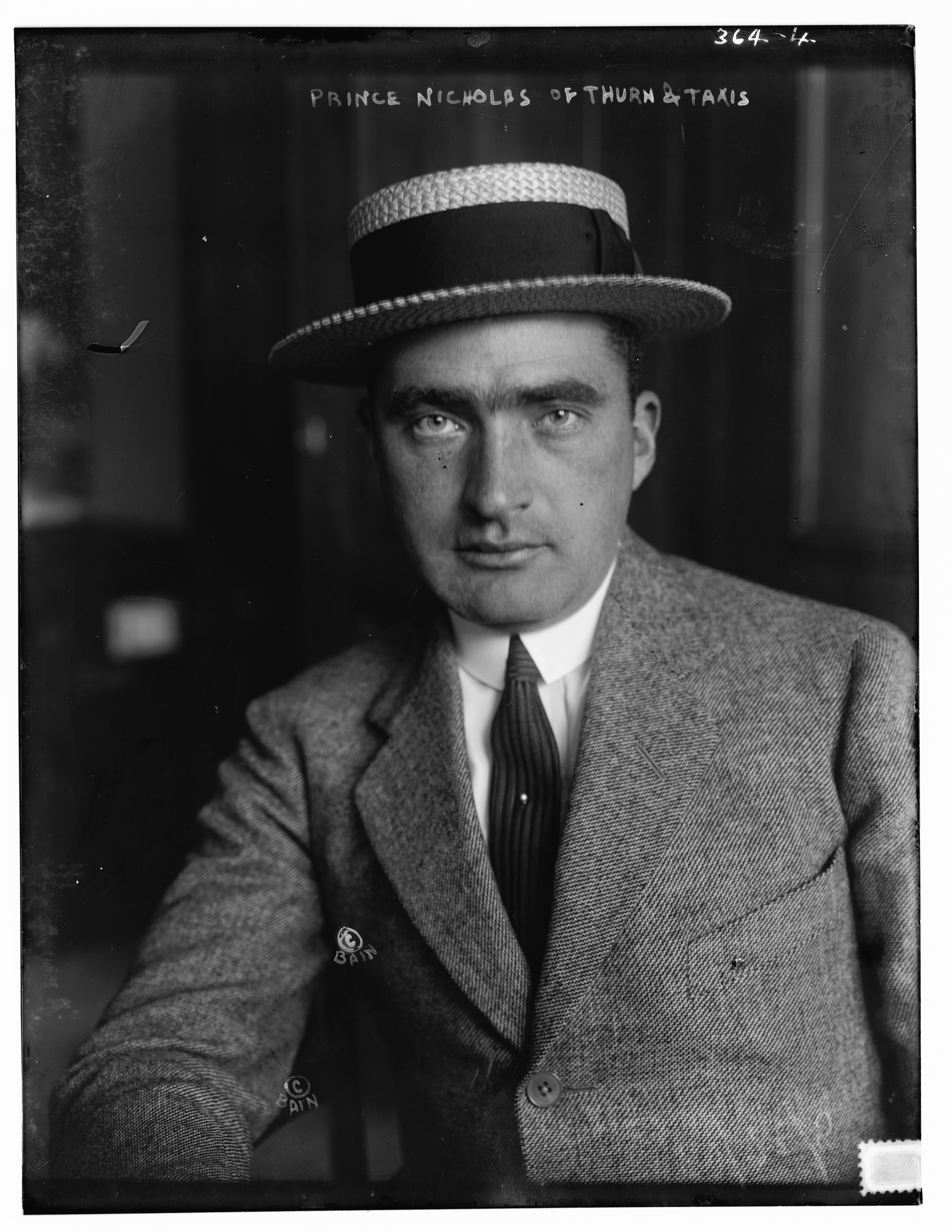
- Born: 21 January 1885; Athens, Kingdom of Greece
- Died: 8 June 1919 (aged 34); Munich, Bavaria, Germany
- Spouse: Carola Reichenberger
Names
- Nicholas; German: Nikolaus
- House: House of Thurn and Taxis
- Father: Prince Franz of Thurn and Taxis
- Mother: Countess Theresia Grimaud of Orsay

Prince Nikolaus of Thurn and Taxis (later Nikolaus, Baron of Hochstadt) (German: Nikolaus Prinz von Thurn und Taxis; Nikolaus, Freiherr von Hochstadt) (21 January 1885 – 8 June 1919) was a member of the Princely House of Thurn and Taxis and a Prince of Thurn and Taxis. Nikolaus was a Lieutenant in the German Imperial Navy (German: Kaiserliche Marine).

== Family ==
Nikolaus was born in Athens, Kingdom of Greece, the eldest child and son of Prince Franz of Thurn and Taxis and his wife Countess Theresia Grimaud of Orsay. Nikolaus was an older brother of Princess Luise of Thurn and Taxis (1887–1949), Prince Gustav of Thurn and Taxis (1888–1919), Prince Egon of Thurn and Taxis (1890–1915), and Prince Franz of Thurn of Taxis (1892–1944). Through his father, Nikolaus was a grandson of Maximilian Karl, 6th Prince of Thurn and Taxis and his second wife Princess Mathilde Sophie of Oettingen-Oettingen and Oettingen-Spielberg.

== Marriage ==
Styles of Prince Nikolaus of Thurn and Taxis
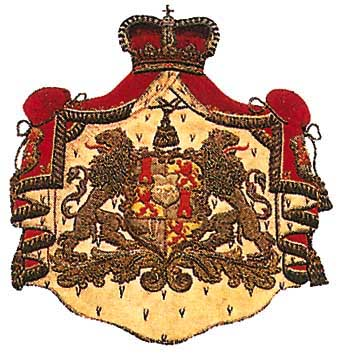
- Reference style: His Serene Highness
- Spoken style: Your Serene Highness

Nikolaus renounced his princely rights and title of "Prince of Thurn and Taxis" and was subsequently created "Baron of Hochstadt" by Otto of Bavaria on 19 May 1913. His renunciation of his succession rights and title followed his engagement to the Munich actress Carola Reichenberger, the daughter of a foreman of a printing shop. Because Reichenberger was "of humbler birth" than Nikolaus, his family objected to the union. It was announced that their wedding was scheduled to take place in early August 1913 and the couple wed on 3 August. Following the wedding, Nikolaus and his wife relocated to Texas in the United States.

== Military career ==
Nikolaus entered the German Imperial Navy (German: Kaiserliche Marine) on 1 April 1903 where he served in the "Fürst Bismarck" unit at the rank of Ensign (German: Fähnrich zur See). By 1913, Nikolaus had attained the rank of Lieutenant.

== Ancestry ==
Ancestors of Prince Nikolaus of Thurn and Taxis (1885–1919)

8. Karl Alexander, 5th Prince of Thurn and Taxis
4. Maximilian Karl, 6th Prince of Thurn and Taxis
9. Duchess Therese of Mecklenburg-Strelitz
2. Prince Franz of Thurn and Taxis
10. Johannes Aloysius III, Prince of Oettingen-Oettingen and Oettingen-Spielberg
5. Princess Mathilde Sophie of Oettingen-Oettingen and Oettingen-Spielberg
11. Princess Amalie Auguste of Wrede
1. Prince Nikolaus of Thurn and Taxis
12. Maximilian Grimaud, Count of Orsay
6. Emil Grimaud, Count of Orsay
13. Countess Maria Dominika of Lodron-Laterano
3. Countess Theresia Grimaud of Orsay
14. Vince, Count Festetics de Tolna
7. Countess Felicitas Festetics de Tolna
15. Baroness Franciska von Wenckheim
