= Prince Gustav =

Prince Gustav may refer to:

- Gustav of Sweden (1568–1607), son of Eric XIV
- Gustav, Prince of Vasa (1799–1877), son of Gustav IV Adolf of Sweden
- Prince Gustaf, Duke of Uppland (1827–1852), son of Oscar I of Sweden
- Prince Gustav of Thurn and Taxis (1848–1914)
- Prince Gustav of Denmark (1887–1944), son of Frederick VIII
- Prince Gustav of Thurn and Taxis (1888–1919)
- Prince Gustaf Adolf, Duke of Västerbotten (1906–1947)
- Gustav, 7th Prince of Sayn-Wittgenstein-Berleburg, (born 1969)
