= Prince Paul =

Prince Paul may refer to:

- Prince Paul of Romania
- Prince Paul of Thurn and Taxis
- Prince Paul of Württemberg
- Prince Paul of Yugoslavia
- Prince Paul (producer)
- Pavlos, Crown Prince of Greece
- Paul Ilyinsky
