= Bohlke =

Bohlke, Böhlke or Boehlke is a German surname. Notable people with the surname include:

- Andrea Boehlke, contestant on Survivor: Redemption Island
- Bain Boehlke, American actor
- Ardyce Bohlke (1943–2013), American educator and politician
- Erich Böhlke (1895–1979), German conductor and composer
- Eugenia Brandt Böhlke (1928–2001), American ichthyologist
- Hellmuth Böhlke, (1893–1956), Nazi Germany general
- James Erwin Böhlke (1930–1982), American ichthyologist
- Sanders Bohlke (born 1984), American songwriter and recording artist
