= Minna Barnay =

German actress (1852–1932)

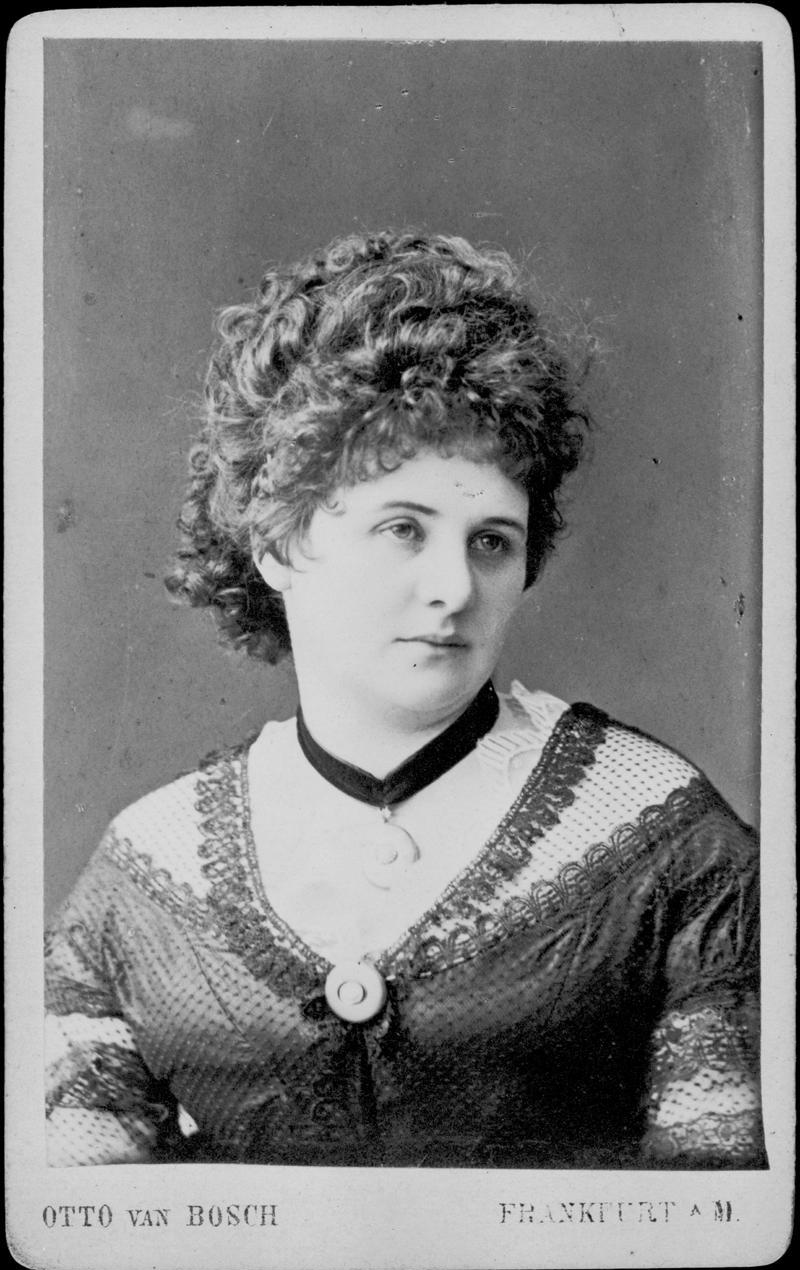
- Carte de Visite (CDV) Portrait of the actress Minna Barnay; Studio photograph by Otto van Bosch, Frankfurt am Main, around 1870; Manskopf Collection of the Johann Christian Senckenberg University Library
- Born: 1852; Hanover
- Died: 3 January 1932 (aged 79–80); Hanover
- Occupation: Stage actress

Minna Barney, also known as Minnie Barney, with the surname Arendt (born 1852 in Hanover – died 3 January 1932, in Hanover) was a German Stage actress.

== Life ==
Minna Barney first performed in Frankfurt, later in Hamburg and Dresden. In 1874, she became a member of the Konzerthaus Berlin.In 1883, she married the actor Ludwig Barnay and retired from the stage that same year.

== Honors ==
After the Hanover City Council decided in 1999 to prioritize naming new streets after women who had played an important role in the city's history, a brochure was published in August 2011 containing information about existing street names in honor of women, as well as a list of women who were to have streets named after them in the future. The list also included the name and biography of Minna Barney.
