= Prince Paul of Thurn and Taxis =

German prince (1843–1879)

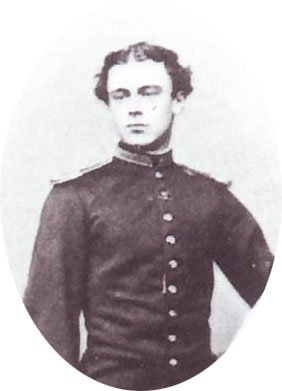
- Created Herr von Fels by King Ludwig II on 19 June 1868
- Born: 27 May 1843; Regensburg, Kingdom of Bavaria
- Died: 10 March 1879 (aged 35); Cannes, Alpes-Maritimes, France
- Burial: Cannes, France, Cimetière du Grand Jas, Allée du Silence no. 33
- Spouse: Elise Kreuzer (m. 1868)
- Issue: Heinrich von Fels (1867–1955)
Names
- German: Paul Maximilian Lamoral
- House: Thurn and Taxis
- Father: Maximilian Karl, 6th Prince of Thurn and Taxis
- Mother: Princess Mathilde Sophie of Oettingen-Oettingen and Oettingen-Spielberg

Paul Maximilian Lamoral, Prince of Thurn and Taxis (full German name: Paul Maximilian Lamoral Fürst von Thurn und Taxis; 27 May 1843 – 10 March 1879), was the third child of Maximilian Karl, 6th Prince of Thurn and Taxis and his second wife Princess Mathilde Sophie of Oettingen-Oettingen and Oettingen-Spielberg. He was buried in Cannes, at the Cimetière du Grand Jas, Allée du Silence no. 33 under the name of Paul de Fels.

== Friendship with Ludwig II of Bavaria ==
At the request of his father to King Maximilian II of Bavaria, he was appointed on 15 November 1861 as junior lieutenant in the 2nd Bavarian artillery regiment (military registry no. KA OP 69 547) and was assigned as orderly officer of then Crown Prince Ludwig on 1 May 1863. Ludwig and Paul became close friends after spending three weeks together in Berchtesgaden in September 1863. After Ludwig's accession to the throne in 1864, Paul was promoted to personal aide-de-camp of the king on 18 January 1865. In the following two years, Paul von Thurn und Taxis, who matched the king in his good looks, became the closest friend and confidant of the monarch.

Although it is unknown if this infatuation, like that with Richard Wagner, was sexually expressed, there were rumours in Munich that Ludwig was sexually intimate with his aide-de-camp.

Paul appears to have kept a diary, but like everything else concerning him in the Regensburg archives of the Thurn und Taxis family, it has been destroyed. The following letter was sent by Paul to Ludwig from his apartment at Türkenstrasse 82 in Munich on 5 May 1866:

Dear and Beloved Ludwig! I am just finishing my diary with the thought of the beautiful hours which we spent together that evening a week ago which made me the happiest man on earth… Oh, Ludwig, Ludwig, I am consecrated to you! I couldn’t stand the people around me; I sat still and, in my thought I was with you ... How my heart beats when, at the Residenz, I see a light in your window.

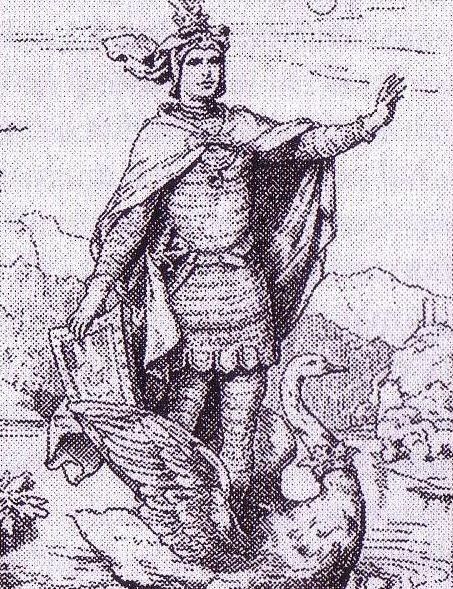
Prince Paul of Thurn and Taxis as Lohengrin.

Paul and Ludwig shared their passion for Richard Wagner and the theatre. He was gifted with a beautiful voice and sang before the King several times. Wagner rehearsed with Paul a part of the opera Lohengrin which was performed at the occasion of the 20th birthday of the king on 25 August 1865 at the Alpsee in Hohenschwangau. It was magnificently staged with Paul - dressed as Lohengrin wearing a silver shining armor - drawn over the lake by an artificial swan and the whole scenery was illuminated by electric light.

After Richard Wagner was forced to leave Munich on 10 December 1865, Prince Paul of Taxis served as a discreet messenger and intermediary between Ludwig and Wagner. Ludwig apparently also toyed with the idea of abdicating in order to follow his hero into exile, but Wagner with the assistance of Taxis dissuaded him from doing so, while both of them stayed incognito at Wagner's Villa in Tribschen in May 1866. Using the alias Friedrich Melloc, Paul travelled again to Tribschen on 6 August 1866, this time, however without Ludwig, obviously to convince Wagner to return to Munich. Paul's following letter to Ludwig is dated 7 August 1866:

I have just left the intimate circle of the Dear Friends (i.e. Richard & Cosima Wagner) and have retired to the cosy little room which we shared when we were here together… Beautiful memory!...He and Frau Vorstal (i.e. Richard & Cosima Wagner) send their deepest greetings. May God protect you and keep you on the Throne. This is their wish and my own, because only then can we achieve our high ideal. The results of my mission are best given verbally, and I believe that you will approve of them….But now good night, in my thoughts I salute you a thousand times. Your sincere and faithful Friedrich.

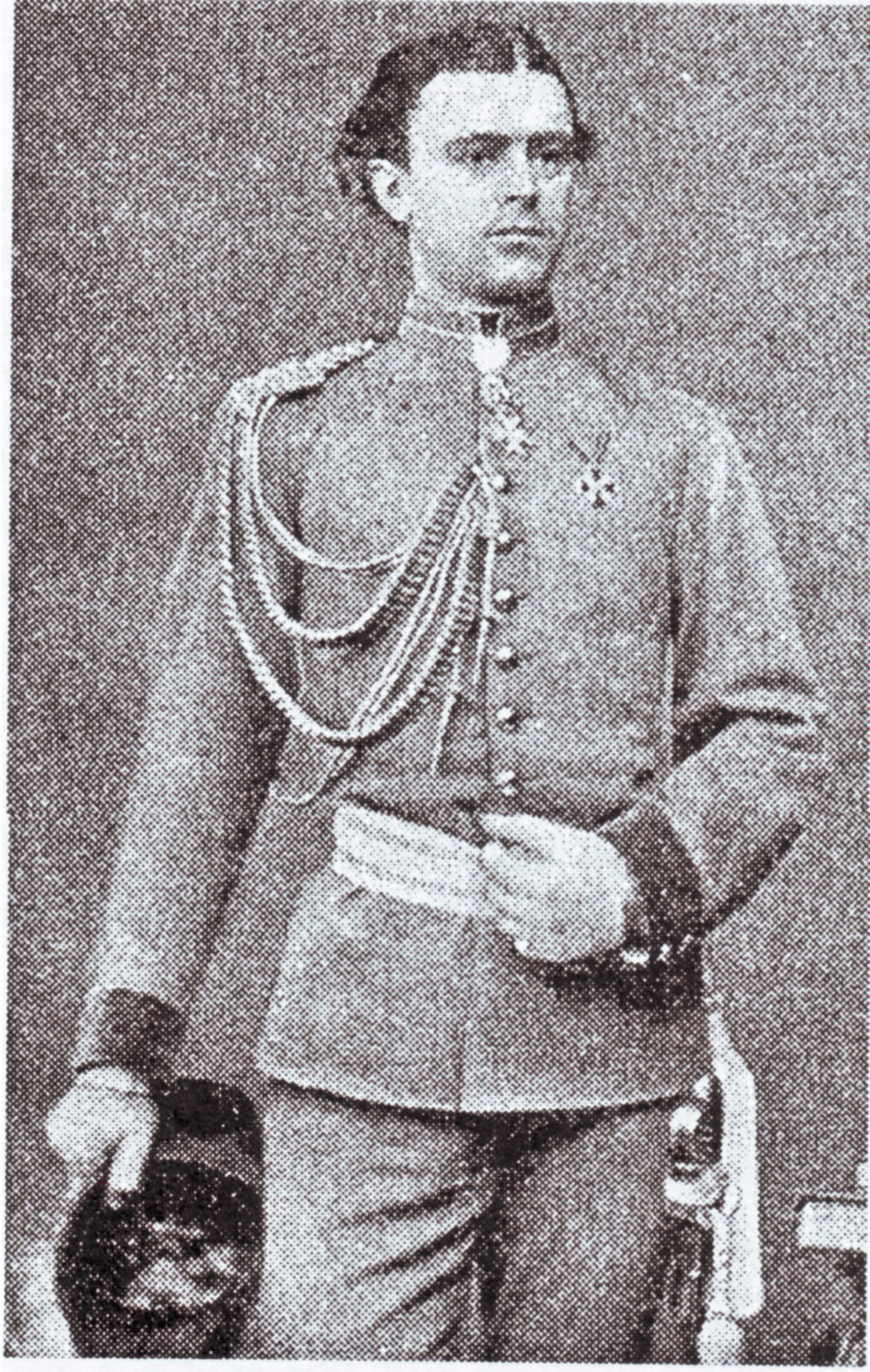
Prince Paul of Thurn and Taxis.

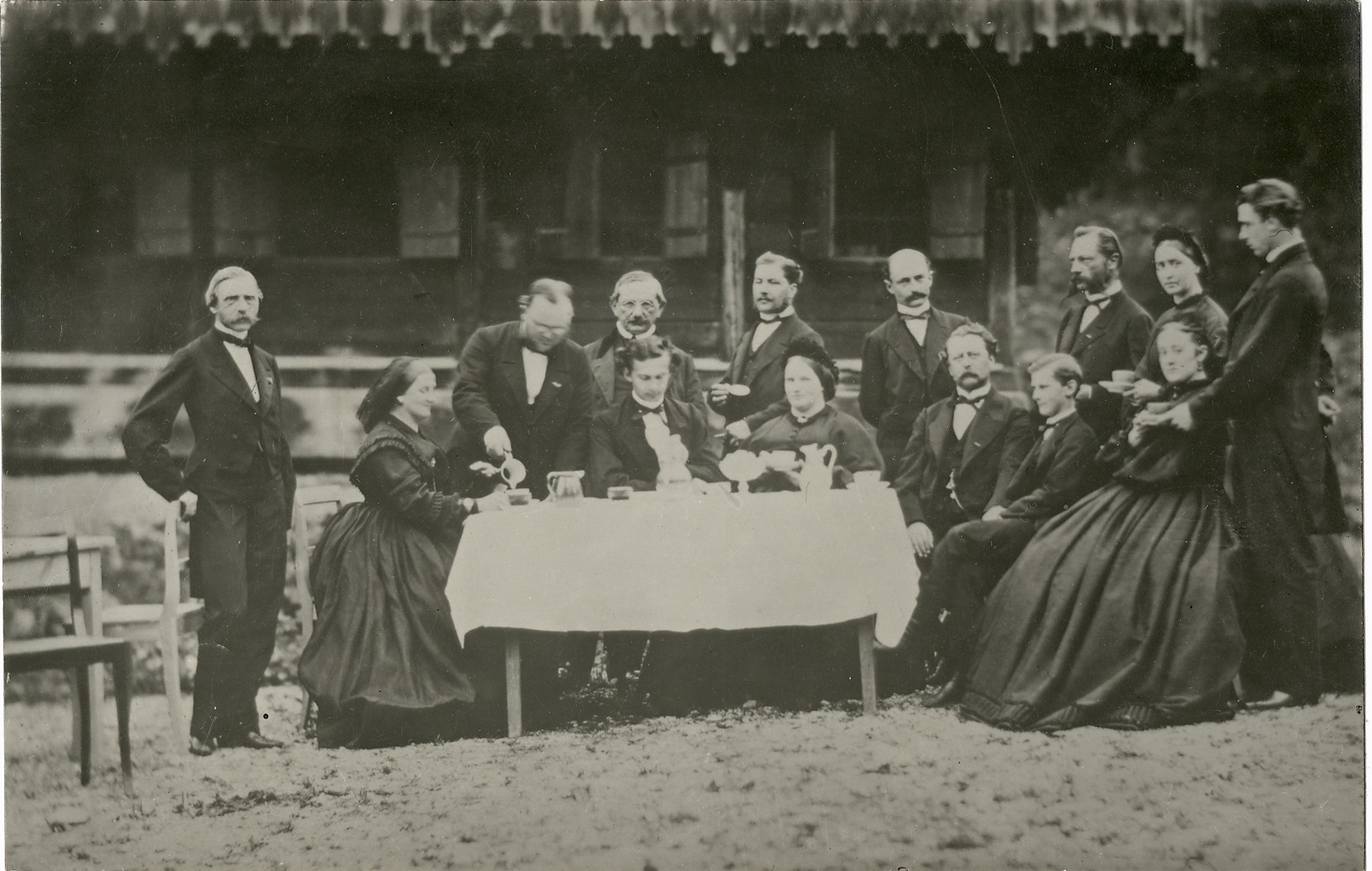
Sitting (from left to right): King Mother Marie, King Ludwig II, Lady-in-Waiting Countess Juliane von der Mühle, Medical Officer von Wolfsteiner, Prince Otto (Ludwig's brother), Lady-in-Waiting Therese von RedwitzStanding (from left to right):Constable Graf Max zu Pappenheim, Marshal Ludwig von Malsen, Privy Councillor Franz Xaver von Gietl, Captain Theodor Sauer (Ludwig's adjutant), Baron von Godin and Captain Anton von Orff (both adjutants of Prince Otto), Lady-in-Waiting Charlotte Fugger, Prince Paul of Thurn and Taxis

But soon the relationship between Paul and Ludwig soured. Jealous tongues attempted to discredit Paul, and evil and untrue rumours reached Ludwig's ears that Paul lived a frivolous life. Having little malice in his own nature, Ludwig could never get used to it in others and at first he probably took the rumours about Paul at face value.

Although Ludwig's feelings for his friend grew deeper and developed into great love, the friendship was so precariously balanced that the slightest tremor of reality threatened to send it plummeting to oblivion. Paul again “faltered” making a wrong choice, saying the wrong word, displaying too much familiarity on one occasion and not enough affection on another. Trivial in themselves, such incidents preyed upon Ludwig's mind until they became unbearable. Once and for all, he cut Paul out of his life. Apparently the final indiscretion was so trivial that even Paul himself was unaware of it. When he learned of his fall from grace, he sent some agonized letters to the King, but there was to be no response from Ludwig. Paul's letter to Ludwig is undated, but must have been written somewhere about the middle of December 1866:

My own beloved Ludwig! What in the name of all the Saints has your Friedrich done to you? What did he say that no hand, no good night, no Auf Wiedersehen favoured him? How I feel I cannot say, my trembling hand may show you my inner disquiet. I did not intend to hurt you. Forgive me; be good again with me, I fear the worst - I cannot stand this. May my notes climb to you reconcilingly. Amen! Forgive your unhappy Friedrich.

== Marriage, estrangement and death ==
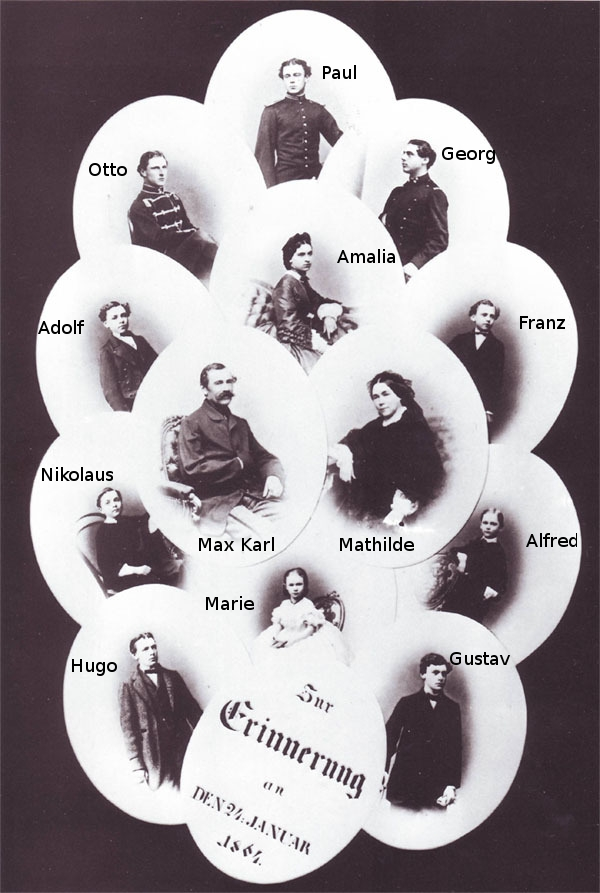
Prince Paul of Thurn and Taxis (top) together with his family at the occasion of the silver wedding anniversary of his parents on 24 January 1864.

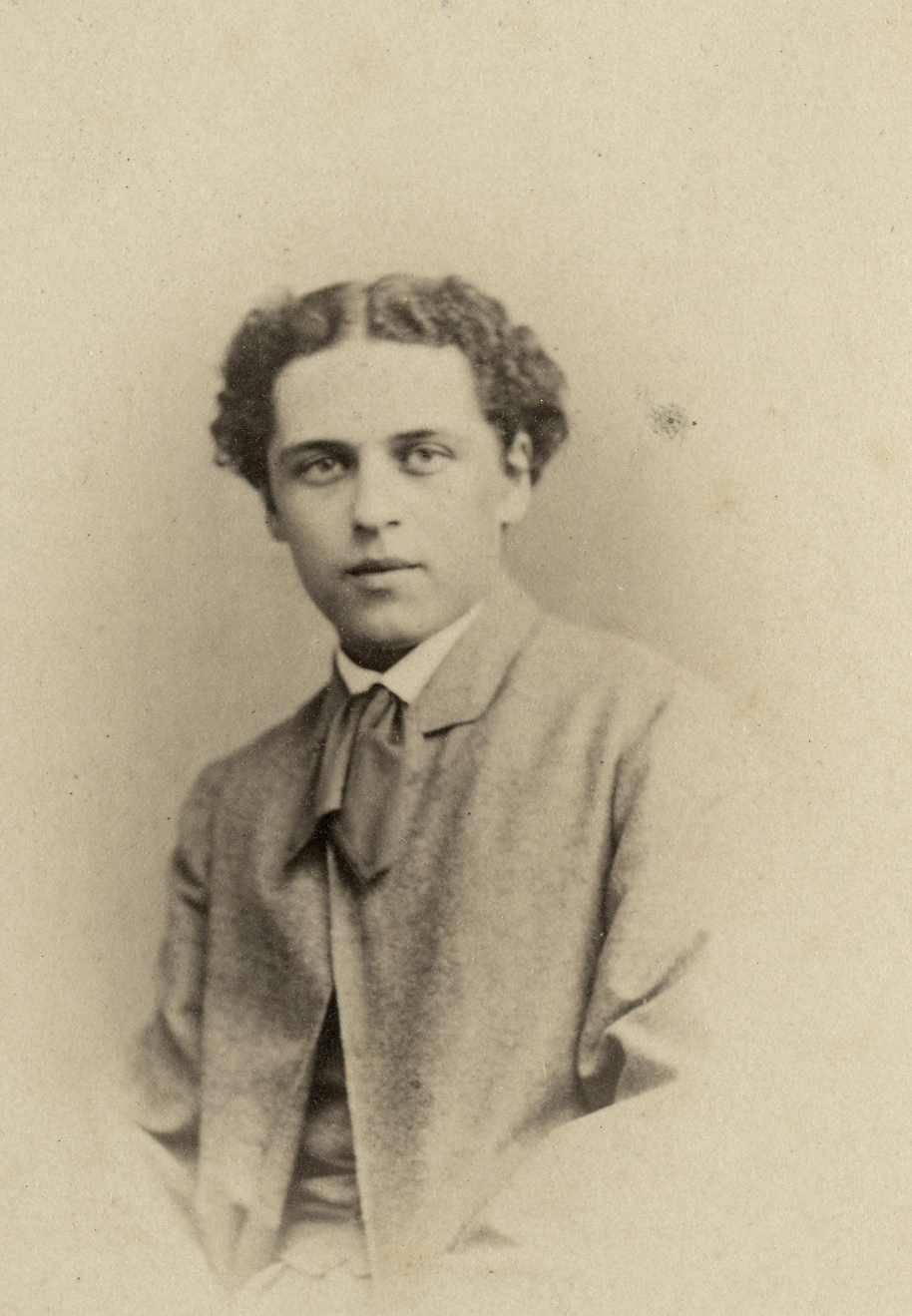
Paul von Thurn und Taxis

On 7 November 1866, Paul was released from his duties as aide-de-camp and transferred to an artillery regiment "under gracious recognition of his services". From midst November 1866, he started to drink without limits and in a state of turmoil and distress ended up with the Jewish soubrette Elise Kreuzer of the Actien-Volkstheater.

After their final break up Paul would never see Ludwig again. In January 1867, Paul retired from the Bavarian army under peculiar circumstances, which were later termed as "desertion" by Minister of War Siegmund von Pranckh in 1872. Using the alias "Rudolphi", Paul moved to Wankdorf near Bern, Switzerland, together with Elise where their son Heinrich, named after Elise's father Heinrich Kreuzer, a known opera singer, was born on 30 January 1867.

After Paul received notice that his parents had tasked the Bavarian police to trace their son in order to convince him to abandon Elise, they moved to Mannheim or Ludwigshafen in August 1867. In October 1867, Paul took up an engagement at the municipal theatre of Aachen under the name “Herr von Thurn” together with Elise.

1867 was a very challenging year for the Thurn and Taxis family. Paul's sister Amalie died on 12 February 1867 at the age of 22 and his half-brother, Maximilian Anton Lamoral, the Hereditary Prince of Thurn and Taxis, died on 26 June 1867 at the age of 36. With the annexation of the Free City of Frankfurt am Main - where the Thurn-und-Taxis-Post had its headquarters - by the Kingdom of Prussia in 1866 during the Austro-Prussian war, the era of the Thurn and Taxis family's postal monopoly ended on 1 July 1867 with the handover to Prussia.

In 1868, Prince Paul von Thurn und Taxis was forced by his family to marry Elise morganatically, and thereafter was disowned by them and stripped of all his titles, rank and birthrights against an annual pension of 6000 florin. Paul kept writing to Ludwig but without any reply. In the end he begged the King to give him a title. On 19 June 1868 Ludwig inscribed him upon the list of the nobility of Bavaria as Herr Paul von Fels. However, his later petition for conferment of hereditary nobility was declined on 10 December 1869 at the request of the Bavarian Ministry.

Paul tried to reconnect with Richard Wagner as a diary entry of Cosima Wagner on 11 April 1869 shows:"...Hans reporting nothing but bad things from Munich; on top of that a letter from Paul of Fels (formerly Prince Taxis), who wants an appointment of some kind, and, in order to secure it, tells us a lot of gossip! At three o’clock a boat trip with the three little ones and R."

Paul started a new attempt to reconcile with his father and visited him together with Elise on 3 August 1869 in Schloss Donaustauf, obviously to no avail. Paul then became an actor at the Zurich theatre in Switzerland, but ended his acting career after being hissed off the stage.

After his father died on 10 November 1871, his sister-in-law, Helene of Thurn and Taxis, became the unofficial head of the family until her son, Maximilian Maria, the Hereditary Prince, became of age on 24 June 1883. Known for her diplomatic skills, she tried to reconnect Paul to King Ludwig II and, according to newspaper reports of 1874, Paul was to regain his family name and become the Marshall of the Royal Palace Herrenchiemsee and Master of the Revels to King Ludwig II. However, this was not realized for unknown reasons.

From 1874 to 1878, Elise was the prima donna at the municipal theatre of Freiburg im Breisgau. According to Baring-Gould she "exacted from her husband that, whenever she acted, he should throw a bouquet on to the stage at her feet, and get his friends to do the same".

Shortly after, Paul came down with tuberculosis and went with his wife to Lugano, where he grew worse. Elise formed a liaison with a Prussian officer, staying at the same hotel, and eloped with him, "leaving her husband, who had given up so much for her, to die unbefriended" on 10 March 1879 in Cannes.

In 1879, Paul's widow, under the name of Frau Elisabeth von Fels, joined the Municipal Theatre in Lübeck together with Arno Cabisius, whom she married in 1881. In 1891, Cabisius became the Director of the Magdeburg Municipal Theatre which he led until his death on 6 March 1907. Elisabeth Cabisius-Kreuzer took over the directorship to complete her husband's contract until the end of the season 1907/08. Paul's son Heinrich von Fels studied agriculture in Munich-Weihenstephan, married a certain Maria von Scarparetti in 1897, and in 1898 bought the castle of Teisbach, north of Munich. He retired in to the manor of Huntlosen, Großenkneten, in the district of Oldenburg, Germany, where he died in 1955.

== Cultural Depictions ==
- In the TV series Wagner (1983) with Richard Burton as Richard Wagner and Vanessa Redgrave as Cosima Wagner, Prince Paul of Thurn and Taxis (played by Arthur Denberg) appears performing as Lohengrin on the Alpsee and at the occasion of his visit to Tribschen together with King Ludwig II in May 1866.
- Prince Paul Taxis is featured as lover of King Ludwig II in the three-volume manga series Ludwig II (Ruutovihi II sei) by the artist You Higuri, published by Kadokawa Shoten.
- Prince Paul (Hermann Pröll) makes a brief appearance in the film Ludwig - Requiem für einen jungfräulichen König, from 1972.

== Ancestry ==
Ancestors of Prince Paul of Thurn and Taxis

8. Karl Anselm, 4th Prince of Thurn and Taxis
4. Karl Alexander, 5th Prince of Thurn and Taxis
9. Duchess Auguste of Württemberg
2. Maximilian Karl, 6th Prince of Thurn and Taxis
10. Charles II, Grand Duke of Mecklenburg-Strelitz
5. Duchess Therese of Mecklenburg-Strelitz
11. Princess Friederike of Hesse-Darmstadt
1. Prince Paul of Thurn and Taxis
12. Johannes Aloysius II, Prince of Oettingen-Spielberg
6. Johannes Aloysius III, Prince of Oettingen-Spielberg
13. Princess Maria Aloysia of Auersperg
3. Princess Mathilde Sophie of Oettingen-Spielberg
14. Carl Philipp Joseph, 1st Prince of Wrede
7. Princess Amalie Auguste of Wrede
15. Countess Sophie of Wiser

== See also ==
- Austro-Prussian War
- Baron Karl Ludwig von der Pfordten
- Berg Castle
- Cosima Wagner
- Duchess Sophie Charlotte in Bavaria
- Edgar Hanfstaengl
- Ludwig II of Bavaria
- Prince Chlodwig of Hohenlohe-Schillingsfürst
- Richard Wagner
- Roseninsel

== Citations ==
{Sylvia Alphéus, Lothar Jegensdorf: Fürst Paul von Thurn und Taxis. Ein eigensinniges Leben. München 2017, p. 109–126.}
