= Donaustauf Palace =

Former summer palace of the princes of Thurn and Taxis in Donaustauf, Bavaria, Germany

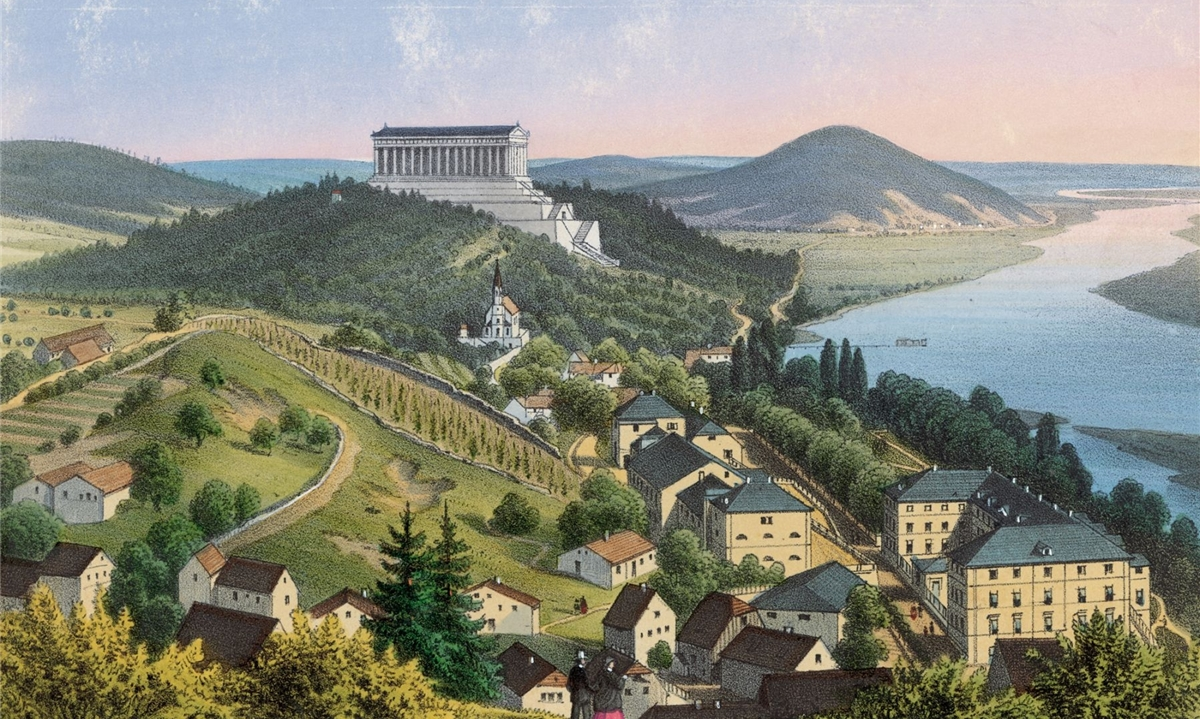
Donaustauf with the palace right below and the Walhalla memorial in the background

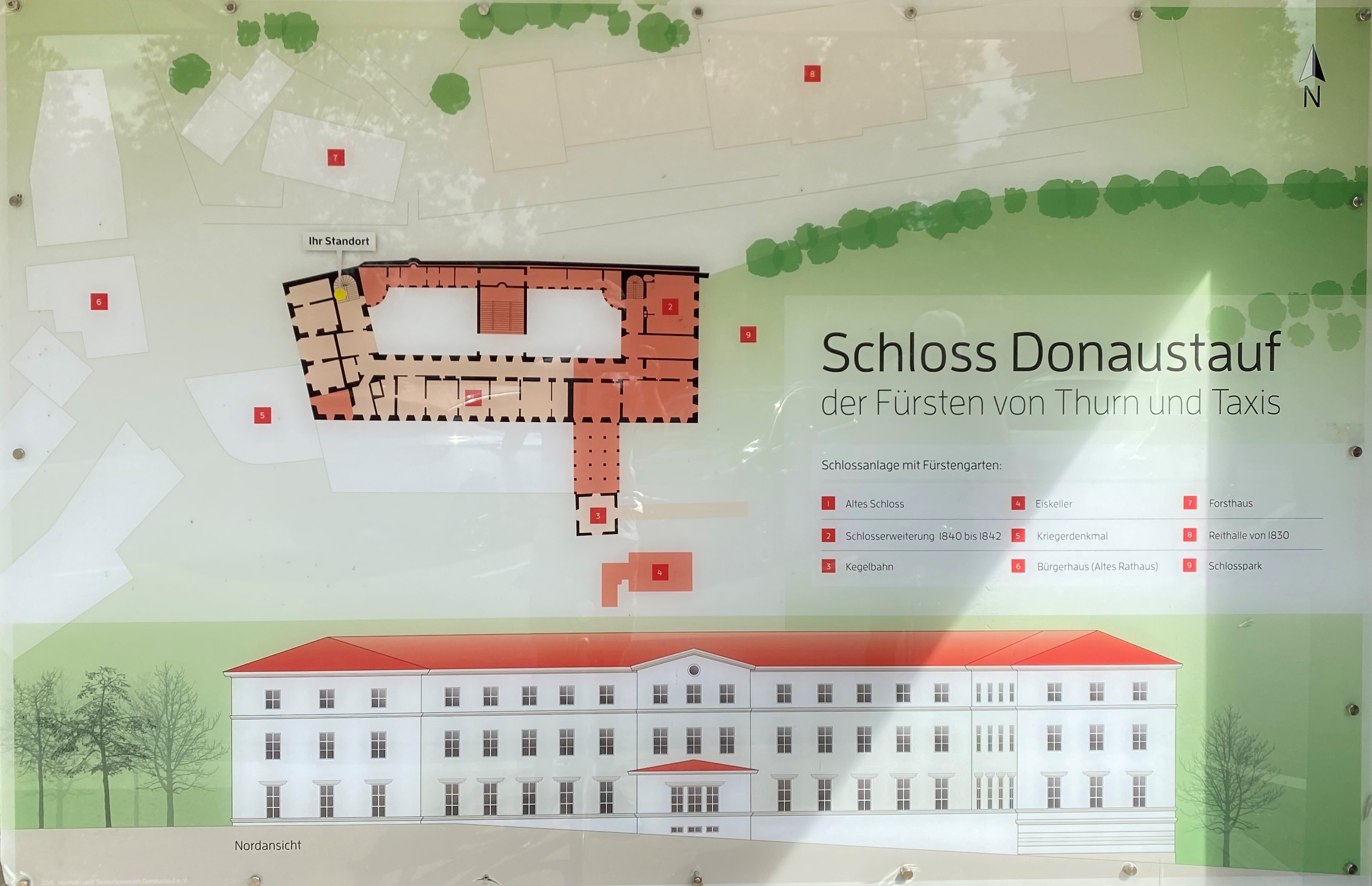
Reconstruction and plan of Donaustauf palace at an information column at the palace's former location in Donaustauf

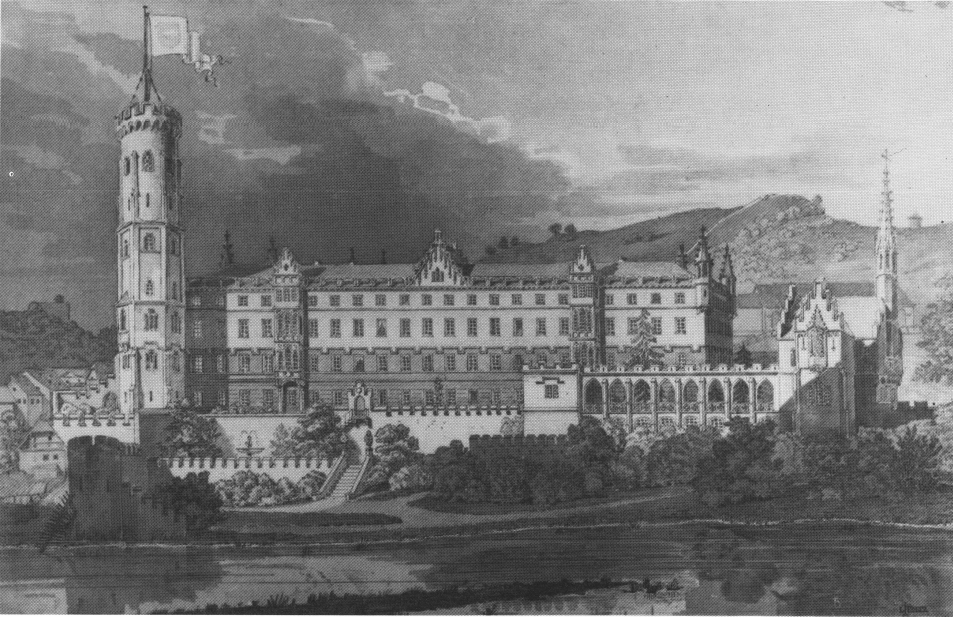
A non-executed neogothic design for the palace by Ludwig Voltz (1846)

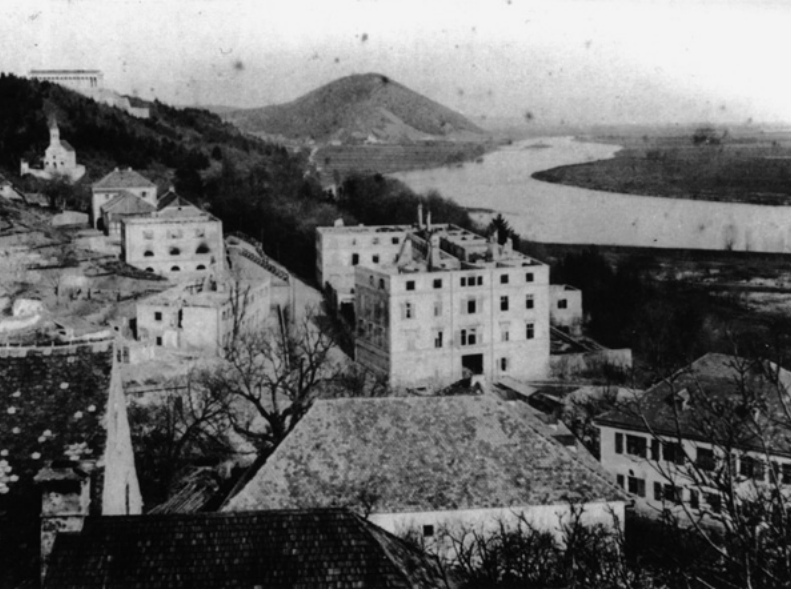
Donaustauf palace after the fire in 1880

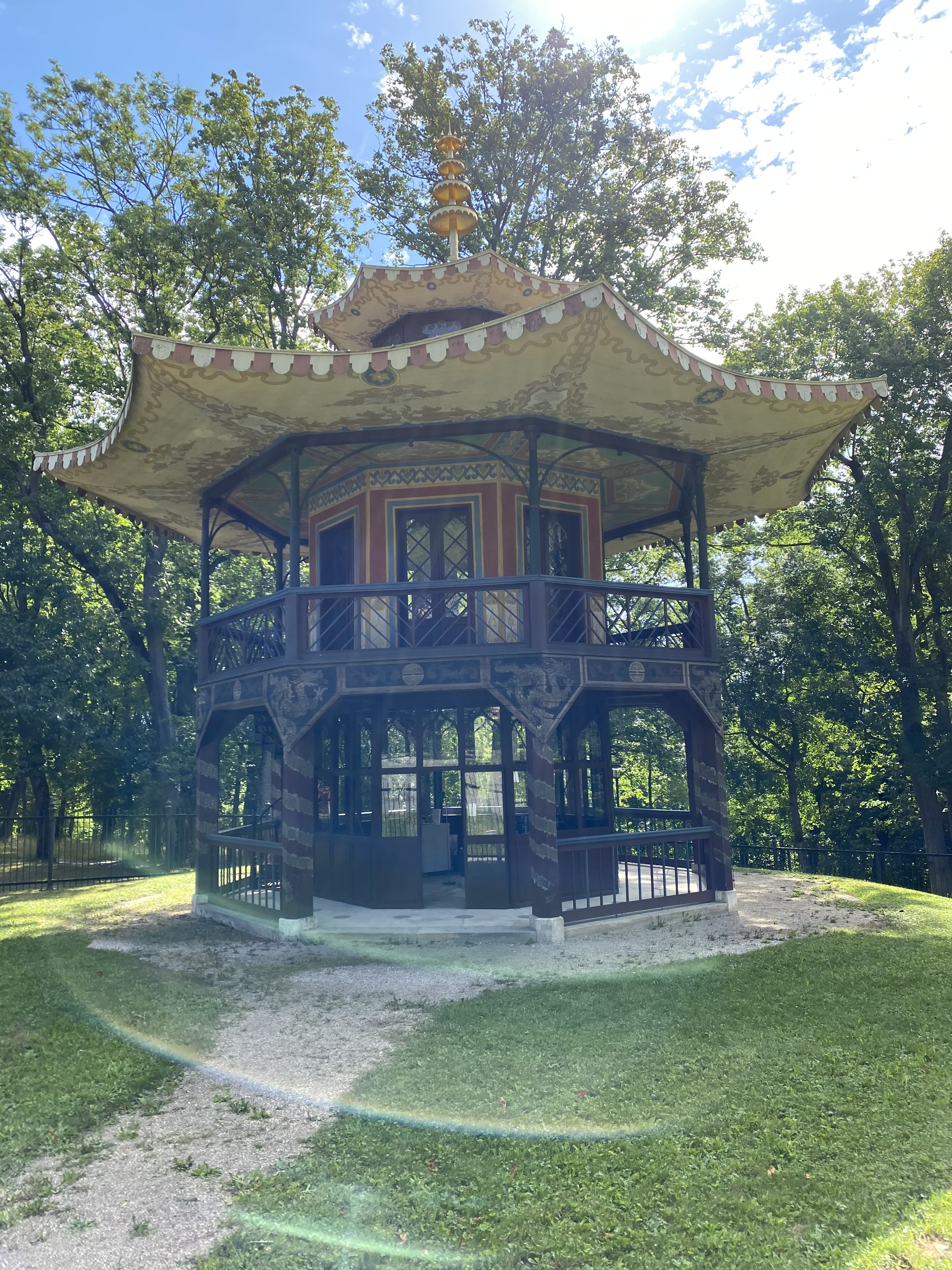
Chinese Tower in the princely gardens

Donaustauf Palace (German: Schloss Donaustauf) was a summer residence of the princes of Thurn und Taxis in Donaustauf, Bavaria in Germany. The palace was destroyed during a fire in 1880. Today, only the gardens with a Chinese teahouse remain.

== History ==
In 1812, Karl Alexander, 5th Prince of Thurn and Taxis (1770-1827) acquired a monastery building, which formerly belonged to the Prince-Bishopric of Regensburg. Between 1817 and 1819, this building was transformed into a princely summer palace overlooking the Danube river.

Under the 6th prince, Maximilian Karl von Thurn and Taxis (1802-1871), who married to Princess Mathilde Sophie of Oettingen-Oettingen and Oettingen-Spielberg (1816-1886) in 1839, the palace became the preferred summer residence as they were drawn to the romantic scenery of the Danube valley. Seven of their twelve children were born at the Donaustauf palace.

Between 1829/1830 and 1841/1842, the palace was rebuilt to mark the construction of the Walhalla (memorial), whose foundation was laid in 1830 and inaugured in 1842. After completion, the palace counted a total of 112 rooms. Various ancillary buildings were erected between 1831 and 1832, such as the stables and a riding hall.

A neogothic rebuilding of the palace was considered in 1843, but did not materialize. Only the designs by Ludwig Voltz remain, the architect responsible for the neogothic renovation of the other princely summer residence, Schloss Taxis.

On 4 March 1880, the palace and many other buildings on the Danube banks in Donaustauf became victim of a large fire. Afterwards, the palace was not reconstructed. Princess Mathilde started to use Schloss Neueglofsheim in Thalmassing as her summer residence.

Today, the princely gardens including a Chinese teahouse (constructed in 1842) and the forestry office belong to the small reminders of the princely palace in Donaustauf. In addition, the head of the princely house of Thurn and Taxis still bears the title 'Duke of Wörth and Donaustauf', which was bestowed to them by the King of Bavaria in 1899.

== Literature ==
- Dallmeier, Martin (1995). "Der Markt Donaustauf und das fürstliche Haus Thum und Taxis im 19. Jahrhundert" (PDF). VHVO (Verhandlungen des Historischen Vereins für Oberpfalz und Regensburg) (in German). 135. Regensburg: 161–181.
