= Stadttheater Magdeburg =

Former theatre in Madgeburg, Germany

Coordinates: 52.1292°N 11.6302°E

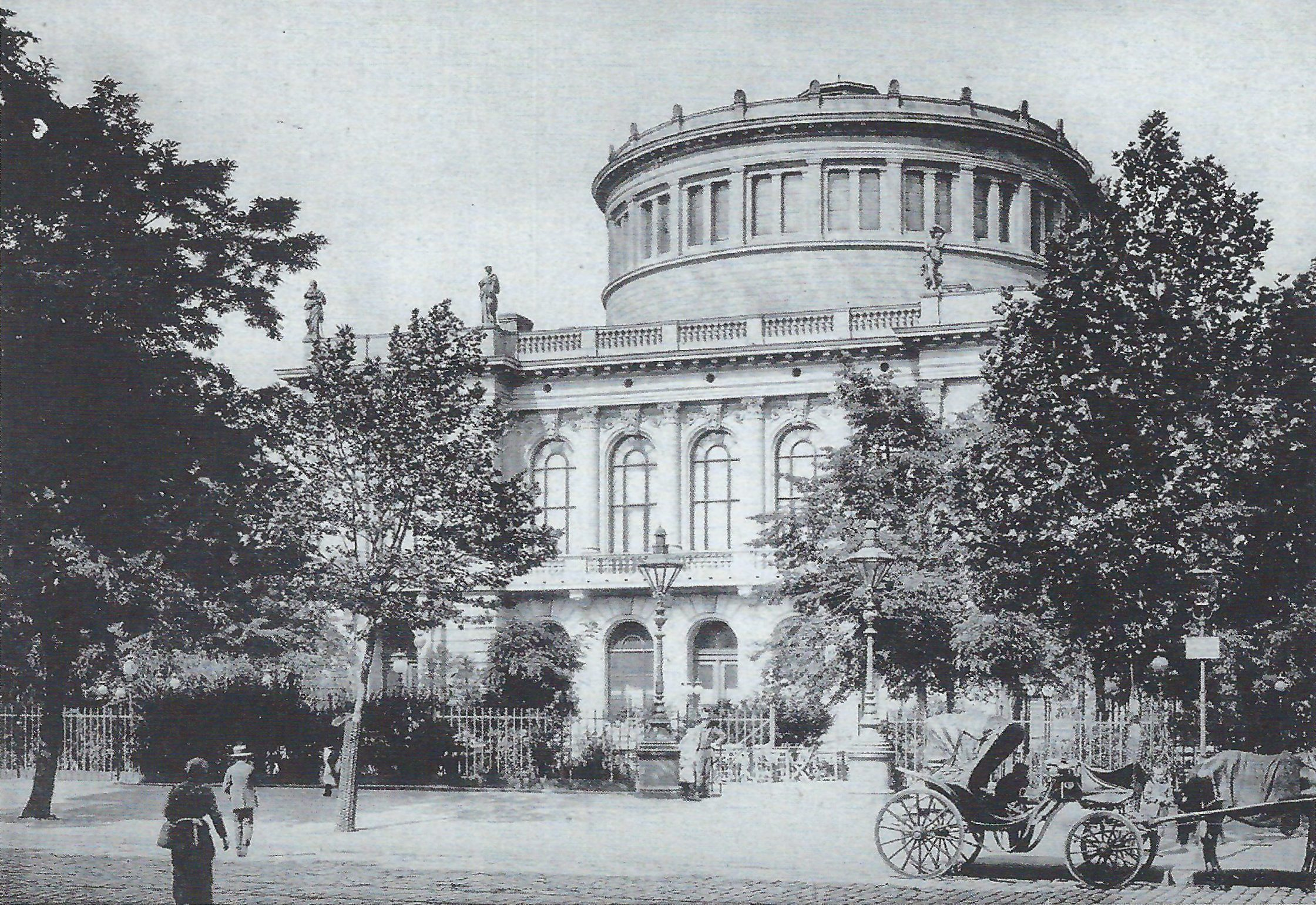
Stadttheater Magdeburg (before 1893)

Stadttheater Magdeburg was the municipal theatre of Magdeburg, Germany. It was opened in 1878, was at times of national importance for operas, and was destroyed during World War II.

== History ==
=== Building ===
Between 1873 and 1876, a new municipal theatre was built on the site of the previously demolished fortifications on Kaiserstraße. The client was a joint-stock company which had been founded specifically for this purpose. Richard Lucae, the director of the Bauakademie, was responsible for the planning. The stage machinery was built by the E. Schwerdtfeger company from Darmstadt, which also worked for Wagner's Bayreuth Festspielhaus.

The theatre seated 1200 people. The opening took place on 6 May 1876, with Goethe's Egmont.

=== Directors ===
The first theatre manager (Intendant), and also chief director (Oberregisseur) was Friedrich Schwemer in 1876/1877. The theatre covered the three genres of opera, operetta and plays. The program of the first season was mostly conservative, playing Weber's Der Freischütz, Shakespeare's The Taming of the Shrew, and Beethoven' Fidelio, among others, including a total of 19 operas. The only risk-taking performance was Bjørnstjerne Bjørnson's play En fallit, resulting in a financial fiasco. Schwemer had to file bankruptcy and was dismissed.

Ludwig Ubrich tried from 1877 until 1882 to run the theatre economically sound, with simpler productions. Efforts were made to have the town take over the theatre.

Adolf Varena staged from 1882 until 1891 large productions including works by Wagner, exclusively with the company's own ensemble. In 1890, the town of Magdeburg became the owner of the property, and leased the theatre for 30 years. Mayor Friedrich Bötticher became chairman of the administrative committee. In 1891, Varena moved to the Stadttheater Königsberg in Königsberg, which he directed until his death.

Arno Cabisius continued from 1891 until 1907 the theatre's artistic rise, presenting a production of Wagner's Der Ring des Nibelungen cycle, and a cycle of Mozart operas, gaining national attention and positive press reviews. In 1901, a May Festival was run to celebrate the 25th anniversary. In 1897, the orchestra also became municipal. Cabisius died in March 1907. His widow, Baroness Elisabeth von Fels (1845–1936), whose first marriage was to Prince Paul of Thurn und Taxis, continued his job until the end of the 1907/1908 season.

Carl Coßmann, in charge from 1908 until 1912, met financial difficulties and the theatre declined, partly due to the newly opened Centraltheater. The director of plays, Heinrich Vogeler, gave more prominence to that part. In 1912, bankruptcy was filed.

Heinrich Hagin succeeded as director in 1912, but never dropped his positions at both the municipal theatre in Karlsruhe and the Berlin Kroll Opera House, and stayed only for two years.

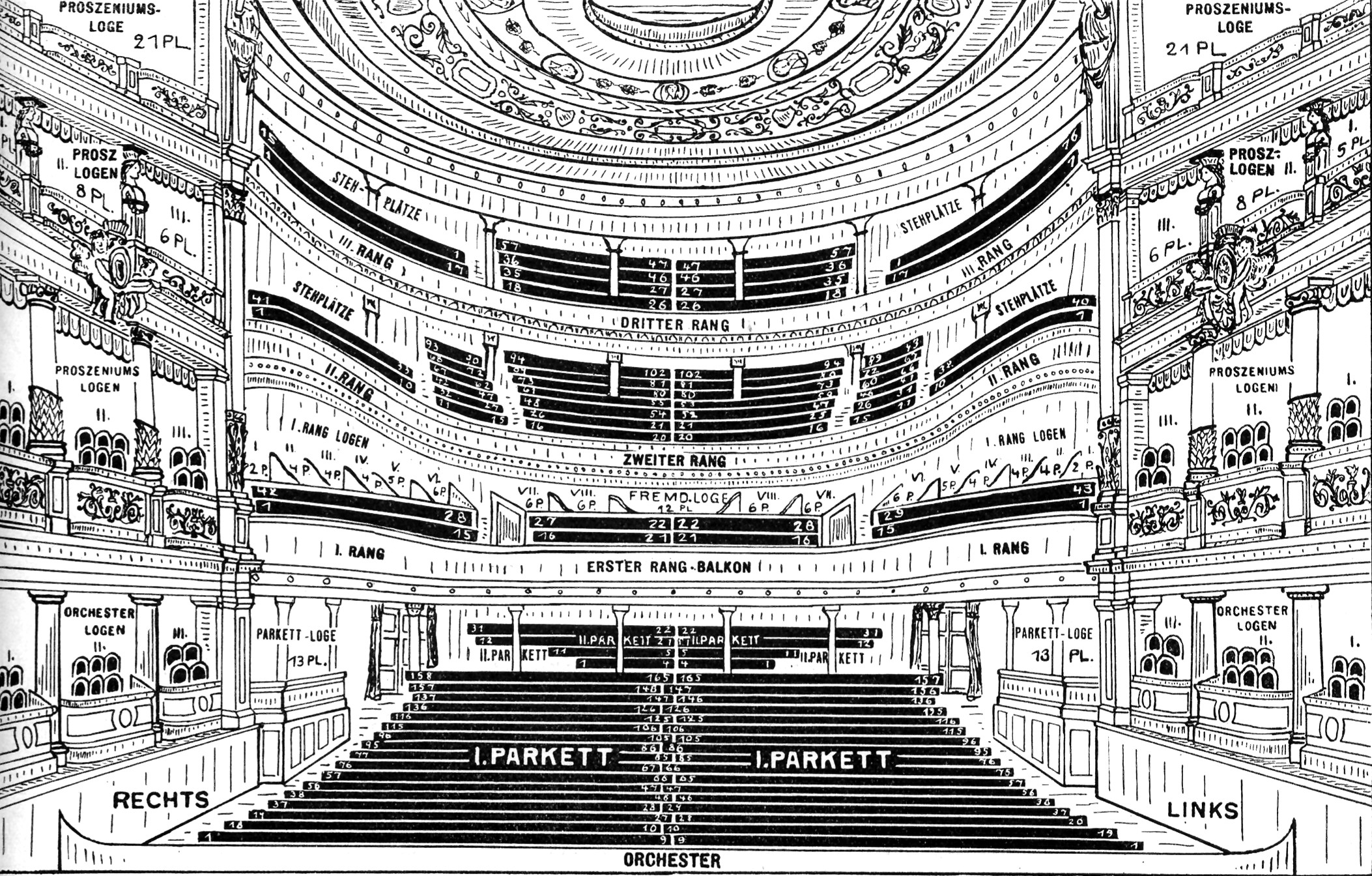
Interior in 1916

The former director of play Heinrich Vogeler was offered the position in 1913, the first to get a regular salary. His first season, with a focus on operas by Verdi and Wagner, was a success, with guest singers from great opera houses.

The beginning of the First World War caused considerable problems. The 1914 season offered many national-conservative plays (Das eiserne Kreuz, Lieb Vaterland, magst ruhig sein and Das Volk in Waffen), but still works by authors from now hostile countries: Shakespeare, Verdi and Puccini. The plays were replaced a years later by classical plays by Hebbel, Grillparzer and Ibsen, but not the expressionist plays performed elsewhere at the same time.

Vogeler significantly lowered ticket prices and the number of soloists, because attendance declined. In the summer of 1917, he leased the Viktoriatheater as a second venue, increasing flexibility. The most important artistic event during this period was the first performance of Wagner's Parsifal at the house in April 1920.

The same years, the town of Magdebuurg took over running the theatre, organised as the Städtische Bühnen Magdeburg, including the Viktoriatheater and the Wilhelm-Theater. Mayor Hermann Beims was the chairman of the theatre committee. Vogeler reorganised the parts, playing opera mostly in the main venue. The world economic crisis led to considerable problems. When the town tried to cut its funding, Vogeler who was not ready to lower artistic standards, resigned on 22 January 1930.

Starting his job in 1930, Egon Neudegg put a special emphasis on operetta, which for the first time formed its own ensemble. It was played at the Central-Theater, now also affiliated to the municipal theatre. Neudegg achieved a short-term increase in audience, but in the long run, it was a financial failure. In 1932, the Centraltheater was separated from the municipal theatre again, and Neudegg resigned in 1932.

Hellmuth Götze (1932–1933) was able to achieve a high artistic level in a few months, and also installed a pricing system leading to economic stability. He ran into conflict with the growing National Socialist influence. On the occasion of a performance of Kaiser's play Der Silbersee, Götze was accused by the Nazis of "Bolshevisation". In the Magdeburg elections on 12 March 1933, the NSDAP achieved the absolute majority in the city council.

Fritz Landsittel was a NSDAP party member, who finished the 1933 season Götze had planned, but cancelling works by Jewish composer Jacques Offenbach, and forcing Kapellmeister Jean-Siegfried Blumann to leave. Landsittel was dismissed after three months due to human and artistic concerns.

Edgar Klitsch, appointed on 11 July 1933, lost quality and importance. Many former employees were no longer allowed to work, others left the town and went to other stages. Klitsch also left Magdeburg at the beginning of 1934 and became director in Königsberg.

The independent Erich Böhlke (1934–1939) was a professional who developed the theatre to one of the most important music centres in Germany. He founded a municipal choir of 300 people. The stage performances were subject to the censure; performance plans had to be approved by Berlin.

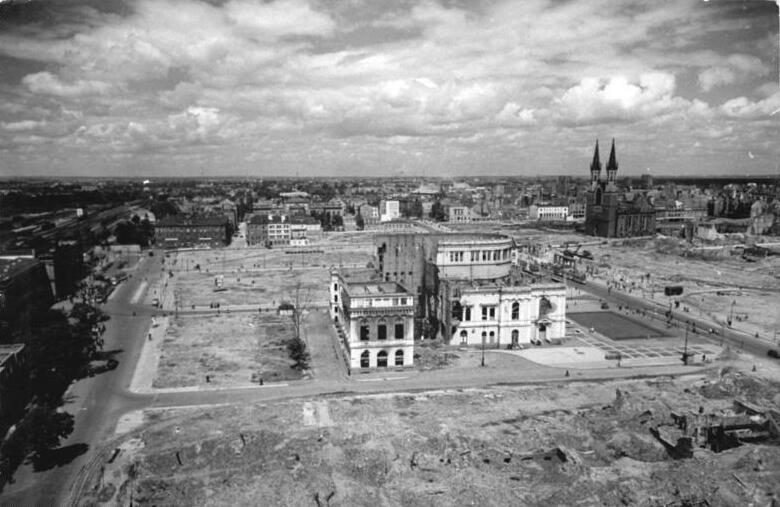
The war-damaged theatre in 1950

In 1939, Kurt Ehrlich, a party and SS member, became director, while Böhlke remained as Generalmusikdirektor. At the beginning of the Second World War, the Reich Ministry of Public Enlightenment and Propaganda announced that the Magdeburg theatre was considered to be of state importance, and that the 1939/40 season was to be held. It was difficult, due to many ensemble members being drafted, and increasing air raid alarms. Only short works were played, beginning already at 6pm. A bunker was built directly in front of the theatre.

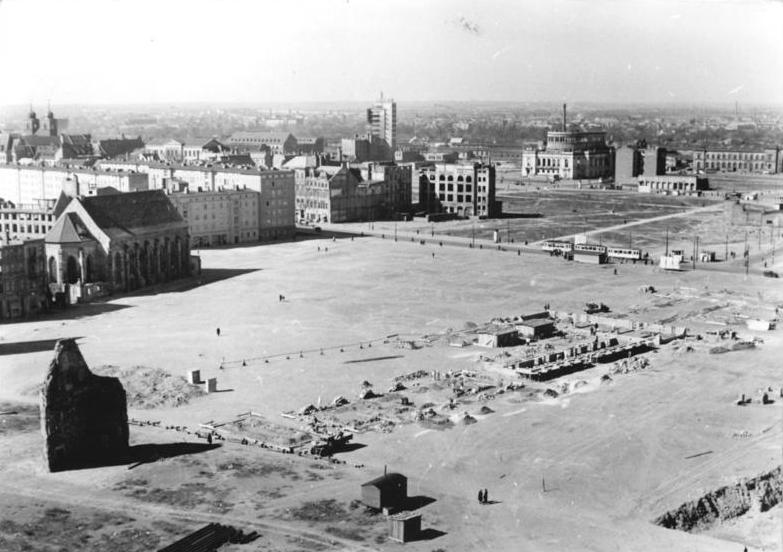
The theatre ruin in 1953

On 1 September 1944, all German theaters were closed. The last performance after 68 years was Mozart's Figaro on 31 August 1944. During the later air raids, the main building was badly hit and destroyed.

=== After 1945 ===
The ruins remained, until they were dynamited in 1958. The stones were partly used for the reconstruction of the Stadthalle Magdeburg, and for other building projects. A park was created on the site. After the 1989 German reunification, the area was newly developed, with only the new street name "Am Alten Theater" (At the old theatre) reminding of the former municipal theatre.

Theater Magdeburg plays since 2004 at an opera house on Universitätsplatz and a theatre on Otto-v.-Guericke-Straße.
