= Arno Cabisius =

German opera singer

Arno Cabisius (15 September 1843 – 6 March 1907) was a German operatic baritone, theatre director and theatre manager.

== Life ==
Born in Magdeburg, Cabisius came from a musical family and also received his first musical lessons from his father Julius Cabisius, later concert master in Bremen. His actual education was taken over by Julius Stockhausen, who designated Cabisius for concert singing.

But he was encouraged to use his beautiful appearance and the power of the organ for the stage and so he tried his hand at the Stadttheater in Mainz in 1867. He liked it and decided to stay with the stage. Then he was engaged at the municipal theatre in Danzig, later he was engaged in Poznan and Freiburg and everywhere his beautiful baritone and artistic routine aroused general recognition.

In 1873 Cabisius followed a call to the municipal theater in Szczecin where he worked as a darling of the public for three years. Then he appeared as "Hans Heiling", "Vampyr", "Templar", "Holländer", "Tell", "Don Juan" etc. on the stages in Lübeck, Danzig and Prague (inaugural role "Tell"), until he took over the direction of the Stettiner Stadttheater in 1886, after a successful artistic wandering life, where he had been working as a singer at last. In 1891 he was given the direction of the Stadttheater Magdeburg. There he was generally popular and did not fail to make this stage into an outstanding art institute. He was a member of the masonic lodge Ferdinand zur Glückseligkeit in Magdeburg.

From 1881 Cabisius was married to Elisabeth Kreuzer (1845-1936), the daughter of the then famous singer Heinrich Kreuzer.

== Literature ==
- Ludwig Eisenberg: Großes biographisches Lexikon der Deutschen Bühne im XIX. Jahrhundert. Published by Paul List, Leipzig 1903, p. 148, (Arno Cabisius is available for free viewing and download at the Internet Archive).
