= Prince Gustav of Thurn and Taxis (1848–1914) =

Prince Gustav
- Prince Gustav with his wife Princess Karoline, c. 1877
- Born: 23 February 1848; Regensburg, Kingdom of Bavaria
- Died: 9 July 1914 (aged 66); Bregenz, Vorarlberg, Austria-Hungary
- Spouse: Princess Karoline of Thurn and Taxis (m. 1877)
Names
- German: Gustav Otto Maximilian Lamoral
- House: Thurn and Taxis
- Father: Maximilian Karl, 6th Prince of Thurn and Taxis
- Mother: Princess Mathilde Sophie of Oettingen-Oettingen and Oettingen-Spielberg

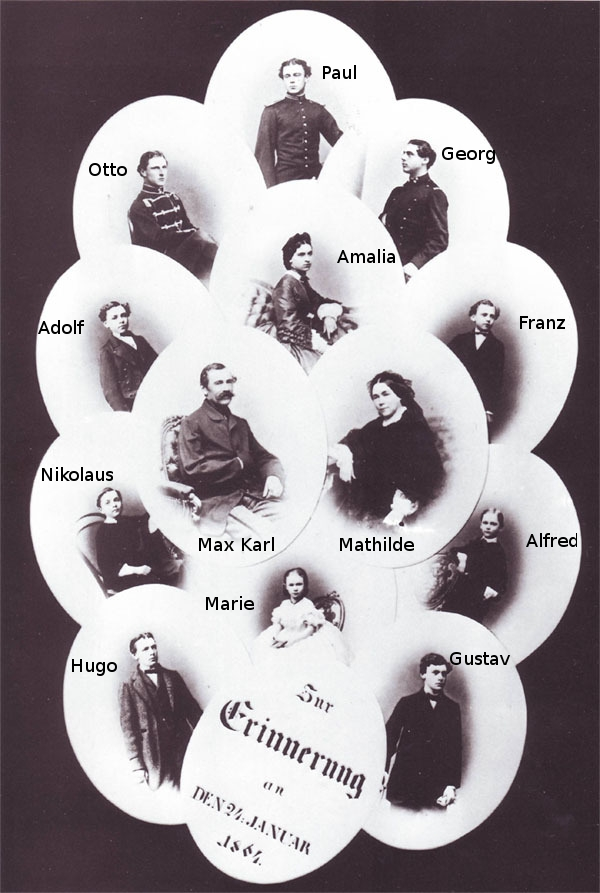
Prince Gustav of Thurn and Taxis (bottom right) together with his family at the occasion of the silver wedding anniversary of his parents on 24 January 1864.

Prince Gustav Otto Maximilian Lamoral of Thurn and Taxis (23 February 1848 – 9 July 1914), full German name: Gustav Otto Maximilian Lamoral Prinz von Thurn und Taxis, was the sixth child of Maximilian Karl, 6th Prince of Thurn and Taxis and his second wife Princess Mathilde Sophie of Oettingen-Oettingen and Oettingen-Spielberg. He was born on 2 February 1848 in Regensburg, Kingdom of Bavaria.

== Family ==
Paul, one of his elder brothers, was an intimate friend and aide-de-camp of King Ludwig II of Bavaria.

== Marriage ==
On 8 September 1877, Gustav married Princess Karoline of Thurn and Taxis, daughter of Hugo Maximilian Prince of Thurn and Taxis and Almeria Countess of Belcredi, in Lautschin, Austria-Hungary. The couple did not have any children.

== Later life ==
From 1882 to 1888, he was Bezirkshauptmann of Bregenz, Vorarlberg, Austria-Hungary, where he died at the age of 66 on 9 July 1914.

In 1884, Prince Gustav acquired the Villa Güllich in Bregenz, which is known today as Palais Thurn & Taxis with a public park area of about 16000 m^{2}, which is heritage-protected. Since 1984, the Palais also houses an international center for contemporary art.

== Ancestry ==
Ancestors of Prince Gustav of Thurn and Taxis (1848–1914)

16. Alexander Ferdinand, 3rd Prince of Thurn and Taxis
8. Karl Anselm, 4th Prince of Thurn and Taxis
17. Margravine Sophie Christine of Brandenburg-Bayreuth
4. Karl Alexander, 5th Prince of Thurn and Taxis
18. Karl Alexander, Duke of Württemberg
9. Duchess Auguste of Württemberg
19. Princess Maria Augusta of Thurn and Taxis
2. Maximilian Karl, 6th Prince of Thurn and Taxis
20. Duke Charles Louis Frederick of Mecklenburg
10. Charles II, Grand Duke of Mecklenburg
21. Princess Elisabeth Albertine of Saxe-Hildburghausen
5. Duchess Therese of Mecklenburg-Strelitz
22. Prince George William of Hesse-Darmstadt
11. Princess Friederike of Hesse-Darmstadt
23. Countess Maria Louise Albertine of Leiningen-Falkenburg-Dagsburg
1. Prince Gustav of Thurn and Taxis
24. Anton Ernst, Prince of Oettingen-Oettingen and Oettingen-Spielberg
12. Johannes Aloysius II, Prince of Oettingen-Oettingen and Oettingen-Spielberg
25. Maria Theresia Walpurga von Waldburg zu Trauchburg
6. Johannes Aloysius III, Prince of Oettingen-Oettingen and Oettingen-Spielberg
26. Karl Joseph Anton, Prince of Auersperg, Duke of Gottschee
13. Princess Maria Aloysia of Auersperg
27. Maria Josepha Rosalie von Trautson, Countess of Falkenstein
3. Princess Mathilde Sophie of Oettingen-Oettingen and Oettingen-Spielberg
28. Ferdinand Josef, Baron of Wrede
14. Carl Philipp Joseph, 1st Prince of Wrede
29. Anna Katharina Jünger
7. Princess Amalie Auguste of Wrede
30. Count Johann Friedrich Heinrich of Wiser
15. Countess Sophie of Wiser
31. Johanna Agathe von Schweitzer
