= Gorgeous Carat =

Japanese manga series

- Cover of the first volume of Gorgeous Carat as published by Shueisha

ゴージャス・カラット (Gōjasu Karatto)
- Genre: Yaoi
- Manga

Gorgeous Carat: Kurayami no Bitoku
- Written by: You Higuri
- Published by: Shueisha
- English publisher: NA: Blu Manga
- Imprint: Eyes Comics
- Original run: 1999 – 2002
- Volumes: 4
- Manga

Gorgeous Carat: Galaxy
- Written by: You Higuri
- Published by: Gentosha
- English publisher: NA: Digital Manga Publishing
- Imprint: Birz Comics Girl's Collection
- Published: 2004
- Volumes: 1
- Manga

Gorgeous Carat: La Esperanza
- Written by: You Higuri
- Published by: Gentosha
- Imprint: Birz Comics Girl's Collection
- Published: 2011
- Volumes: 2
- Manga

Gorgeous Carat: Ao no Karanku
- Written by: You Higuri
- Published by: Gentosha
- Magazine: Web Spica; Comic Spica
- Original run: 2013 – present
- Volumes: 3

Gorgeous Carat (Japanese: ゴージャス・カラット, Hepburn: Gōjasu Karatto) is a yaoi manga series written and illustrated by You Higuri. The series is about the relationship between a man from a poor noble family and a master thief during the Victorian Era in France.

== Characters ==
=== Main characters ===
==== Florian ====
Florian is the last heir of an impoverished noble family. He is 20 years old. He has blond hair and stunning violet eyes, which resemble amethysts. He agrees to be sold to Noir in return for the money to pay his family's debts.

==== Count Ray Balzac Courland/Noir ====
Ray Balzac Courland is a master thief who calls himself "Noir". He lives as an usurer under the name "Count Ray Balzac Courland". He is 18 years old. He prefers to use a whip as a weapon.

==== Laila ====
Laila is Noir's right-hand woman. She is in love with him, and a little jealous of his relationship with Florian.

==== Solomon Sugar ====
Solomon Sugar is a private investigator who is determined to expose Noir's true identity. He gave a nickname to Noir and calls him his "black cat".

==== Noel 'Petit Noel' Tassel ====
Noel is the five-year-old son of Monsieur Tassel. His parents and Florian call him "Petit Noel". He becomes instantly attached to Florian due to Florian's resemblance to his mother. Noel always carries a teddy bear named "Betty Deux", which he calls his treasure. The teddy bear actually contains jewels his father hid there for safekeeping.

==== Louise Mastroianni/Louise Tassel ====
Louise is the female head of the Black Hand's Paris branch. She is originally Italian. She is married to Monsieur Tassel and is mistress to Romwell Sr, Azura's father.

==== Azura/Romwell Jr ====
Azura is the blood brother of Noir. He is secretly the head of several criminal organizations, including the Black Hand.

=== Minor characters ===
==== Monsieur Tassel ====
Monsieur Tassel is Noel's father and the president of the Bank Tassel du Paris. Louise is his second wife, his first having died several years before.

==== Maurice ====
Maurice is Florian's uncle. He attempts to murder Florian's mother and steal the Flame of Mughal. He is killed in the process of stealing the jewel.

==== Manon ====
Manon is Maurice's lover. She joins him in his nefarious plans and is killed along with him in the process.

==== Florian's Mother ====
Florian's Mother is a noblewoman who is forced to sell her treasured family heirlooms to pay off the family's debts. She is presumed to have died in the fire that consumed the family's mansion.

== Release ==
Gorgeous Carat: Kurayami no Bitoku (ゴージャス・カラット 暗闇の美徳), written and illustrated by You Higuri, was published into four volumes under Shueisha's Eyes Comics imprint line from October 25, 1999, to September 25, 2002. Tokyopop licensed it for an English translation in North America, releasing the volumes between February 2006 and February 2007 through its Blu Manga line. On April 24, 2004, Gentosha released a one-shot titled Gorgeous Carat Galaxy: Seinaru Kaibutsu no Mori (ゴージャス・カラット Galaxy 聖なる怪物の森) on its Birz Comics Girl's Collection line. Digital Manga Publishing translated Galaxy into English and published it on July 19, 2006. Under the same line of Galaxy, Gentosha released Gorgeous Carat La Esperanza: Kibō no Seibo (ゴージャス・カラット La Esperanza 希望の聖母) into two volumes on June 24, 2011. Gorgeous Carat: Ao no Karanku (ゴージャス・カラット 青のカランク) has been serialized in Web Spica and Comic Spica magazines since August 2010. Gentosha released the first tankōbon volume on January 24, 2013.

=== Kurayami no Bitoku ===
No.	Original release date	Original ISBN	English release date	English ISBN
1	October 25, 1999	978-4-8342-6122-6	February 2006	1-59816-102-4
2	October 25, 2000	978-4-8342-6139-4	June 2006	1-59816-103-2
3	November 22, 2001	978-4-8342-6156-1	October 2006	1-59816-104-0
4	September 25, 2002	978-4-8342-6161-5	February 2007	978-1-59816-105-2

=== Galaxy ===
No.	Original release date	Original ISBN	English release date	English ISBN
1	April 24, 2004	978-4-344-80401-2	July 19, 2006	978-1-56970-903-0

=== La Esperanza ===
No.	Release date	ISBN
1	June 24, 2011	978-4-344-82247-4
2	June 24, 2011	978-4-344-82248-1

=== Ao no Karanku ===
No.	Release date	ISBN
1	January 24, 2013	978-4-344-82712-7
2	June 24, 2013	978-4-344-82771-4
3	March 24, 2014	978-4-344-83078-3
