= Rose Island (Lake Starnberg) =

Island in Lake Starnberg, Bavaria, Germany

Coordinates: 47°56′28″N 11°18′32″E

UNESCO World Heritage Site
- Rose Island, Lake Starnberg

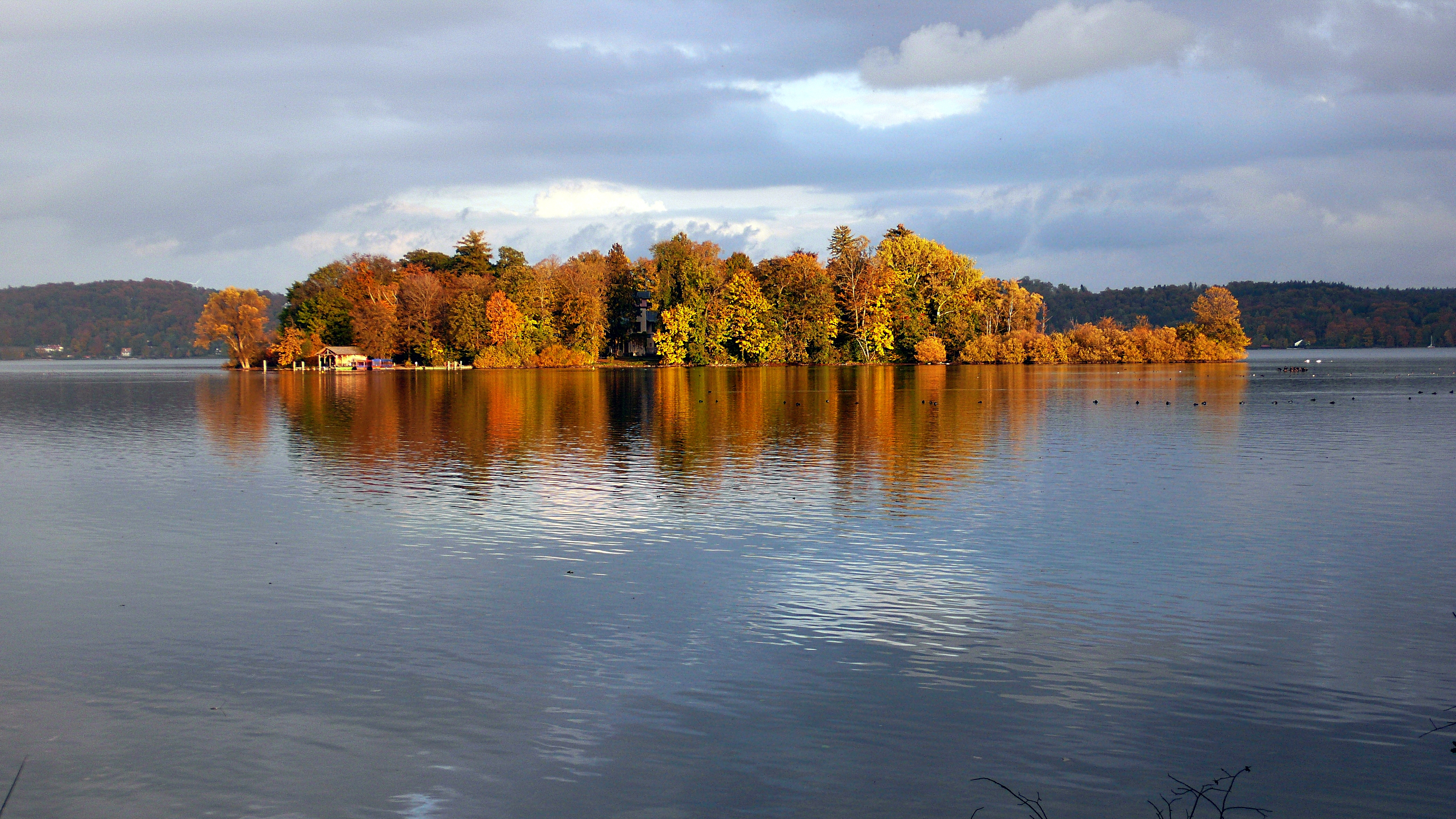
Rose Island

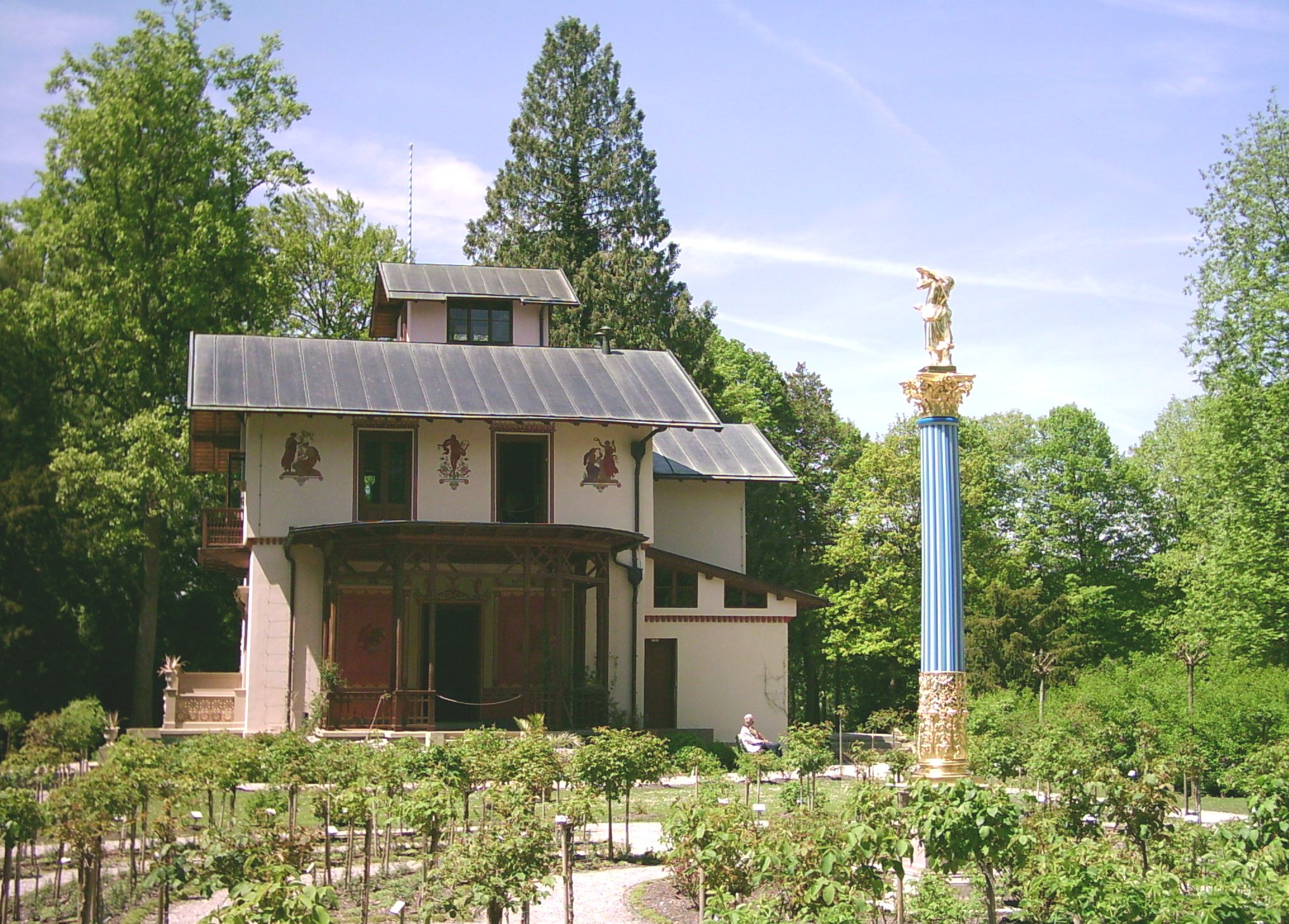
The rose garden and casino

Rose Island (German: Roseninsel [ˈʁoːzn̩ˌʔɪnzl̩]) in Lake Starnberg is the only island in the lake and the site of a royal villa of Ludwig II of Bavaria which had been commissioned by his father. He was particularly attached to this place and made frequent renovations and remodelings of the small garden and the villa, which is called the Casino. Guests on the island included the composer Richard Wagner, his close friend Prince Paul of Thurn and Taxis, Empress Elisabeth of Austria and Grand Duchess Maria Alexandrovna of Russia. The villa is today a small museum, open to the general public and is accessible by a small ferry ride.

It was declared part of the UNESCO World Heritage list in 2011 as one of the 111 locations under the Prehistoric pile dwellings around the Alps listing.
