= Jean-Siegfried Blumann =

Germa conductor and composer

Jean-Siegfried Blumann (2 February 1887 – 1965) was a German conductor and composer.

== Life ==
Blumann was born in Osnabrück, in Hamburg according to other sources. Already at the age of four he showed interest in music and played harmonica. At the age of seven he received music lessons, at 13 he performed in public for the first time. Blumann attended the Kapellmeister class at the Hamburger Konservatorium. His studies also led him to the Conservatory in Vienna. On 5 October 1906 he conducted an orchestra for the first time in an examination concert in the Conventgarten. The Adagio by Ludwig van Beethoven, which he had instrumentalized himself, was performed. He then conducted a small amateur orchestra as well as a women's choir until he went to the Mecklenburg State Theatre as répétiteur in 1908. Two years later he became choir director and kapellmeister in Lübeck. Further engagements took him to Braunschweig, Breslau and to the Kroll Opera House in Berlin.

In 1912 he went to the Stadttheater Magdeburg, where he became municipal Kapellmeister in 1924. He worked as an opera conductor and also conducted folk concerts, so in the circus, in the Kristall-Palast Magdeburg and also in the Stadthalle Magdeburg. In addition, he also appeared as a pianist. As a composer he created two ballet pantomimes, two Christmas fairy tales, a suite for orchestra, several étude, songs, orchestral pieces, a concert piece for cello, incidental music for drama and cheerful pieces. At least around 1916 he lived in Magdeburg at the address Hindenburgstraße 17 (today Albert-Vater-Straße) in the district Stadtfeld Ost.

On 7 April 1933, Blumann, who presumably came from a Jewish family, was granted leave by the newly appointed National Socialist theatre management. Between 1933 and 1938 he fled from Germany and went to France where he lived during World War II as well as in the post-war period. At least in 1960 he lived in Tours and conducted orchestras in La Rochelle and Niort. In 1960 he received support from the artists' aid of the Süddeutscher Rundfunk.

== Work ==
- Harlekinade, for salon orchestra, Magdeburg: Heinrichshofen, 1929.
- Menelaus, Foxtrot for salon orchestra, Magdeburg: Heinrichshofen, 1929.
- Auf dem gelben Fluß, for trumpet, piano and organ
- Robert und Bertram, New arrangement of the folk play in four parts for song and dance by Gustav Raeder and Robert Adolf Stemmle, Berlin, 1930.
- Nun leb’ wohl du kleine Gasse, humorous variations on the folk song of the same name
