= Guild of the German Stage =

The Guild of the German Stage (Genossenschaft Deutscher Bühnen-Angehöriger, or GDBA) is the guild for people who work on the legitimate stage. Its members come from both the areas of stagecraft and artistic workers in theaters from all over Germany. The organization is based in Hamburg and is divided into seven regional divisions. It was established in 1871, in Weimar on an initiative by Ludwig Barnay.
