= Prince Gustav of Thurn and Taxis =

German prince

- Born: 22 August 1888; Dresden, Kingdom of Saxony, German Empire
- Died: 30 April 1919 (aged 30); Munich, Bavarian Soviet Republic
- Cause of death: Execution by firing squad
Names
- German: Gustav Franz Maria
- House: Thurn und Taxis
- Father: Prince Franz of Thurn and Taxis
- Mother: Countess Theresia Grimaud of Orsay
- Religion: Roman Catholic

Prince Gustav Franz Maria of Thurn and Taxis (Note: Full German name: Gustav Franz Maria, Prinz von Thurn und Taxis) (22 August 1888 – 30 April 1919) was a member of the House of Thurn and Taxis and a Prince of Thurn and Taxis by birth. As a member of the Thule Society, Gustav was executed by the Bavarian Soviet Republic (German: Bayerische Räterepublik) government during the German Revolution of 1918–19.

== Family ==
Gustav was born in Dresden, Kingdom of Saxony as the fourth child and second son of Prince Franz of Thurn and Taxis and his wife Countess Theresia Grimaud of Orsay. Through his father, Gustav was a grandson of Maximilian Karl, 6th Prince of Thurn and Taxis and his wife Princess Mathilde Sophie of Oettingen-Oettingen and Oettingen-Spielberg.

== Life ==
Gustav studied philosophy at the University of Tübingen. After fighting in World War I, he became a member of the Thule Society (German: Thule-Gesellschaft), a German occultist and völkisch group in Munich, named after a mythical northern country from Greek legend.

== German Revolution ==
As White Guard (German: Weisse Garde) forces (a coalition of Prussian and Bavarian troops combined with Freikorps) surrounded Munich, the Communists began to raid nationalist strong points throughout the city. On 26 April 1919, the Red Army (German: Rote Armee) broke into the Thule Society premises and arrested secretary Countess Heila von Westarp, Gustav, and five other members, labelling them as "right-wing spies." Gustav and the other hostages were taken to the cellar of the Luitpold Gymnasium, which had served as a Red Army post since mid-April. The seven Thule Society members, including Gustav, and three Freikorps soldiers were killed on 30 April as a reprisal for reports of the killing of Red soldiers by Whites at Starnberg. Gustav and his fellow hostages were lined up against a wall and executed by a firing squad. Their deaths may have also been a reprisal for an attempt by Thule Society members to infiltrate the Bavarian Soviet Republic's government and stage a coup d'état on 30 April. Gustav was the most notable of the four titled members killed in the incident, due to his family's extensive ties with several of Europe's royal houses.

== Ancestry ==
Ancestors of Prince Gustav of Thurn and Taxis

8. Karl Alexander, 5th Prince of Thurn and Taxis
4. Maximilian Karl, 6th Prince of Thurn and Taxis
9. Duchess Therese of Mecklenburg-Strelitz
2. Prince Franz of Thurn and Taxis
10. Johannes Aloysius III, Prince of Oettingen-Oettingen and Oettingen-Spielberg
5. Princess Mathilde Sophie of Oettingen-Oettingen and Oettingen-Spielberg
11. Princess Amalie Auguste of Wrede
1. Prince Gustav of Thurn and Taxis
12. Maximilian Grimaud, Count of Orsay
6. Emil Grimaud, Count of Orsay
13. Countess Maria Dominika of Lodron-Laterano
3. Countess Theresia Grimaud of Orsay
14. Vince, Count Festetics de Tolna
7. Countess Felicitas Festetics de Tolna
15. Baroness Franciska von Wenckheim
