= Ludwig Barnay =

German actor

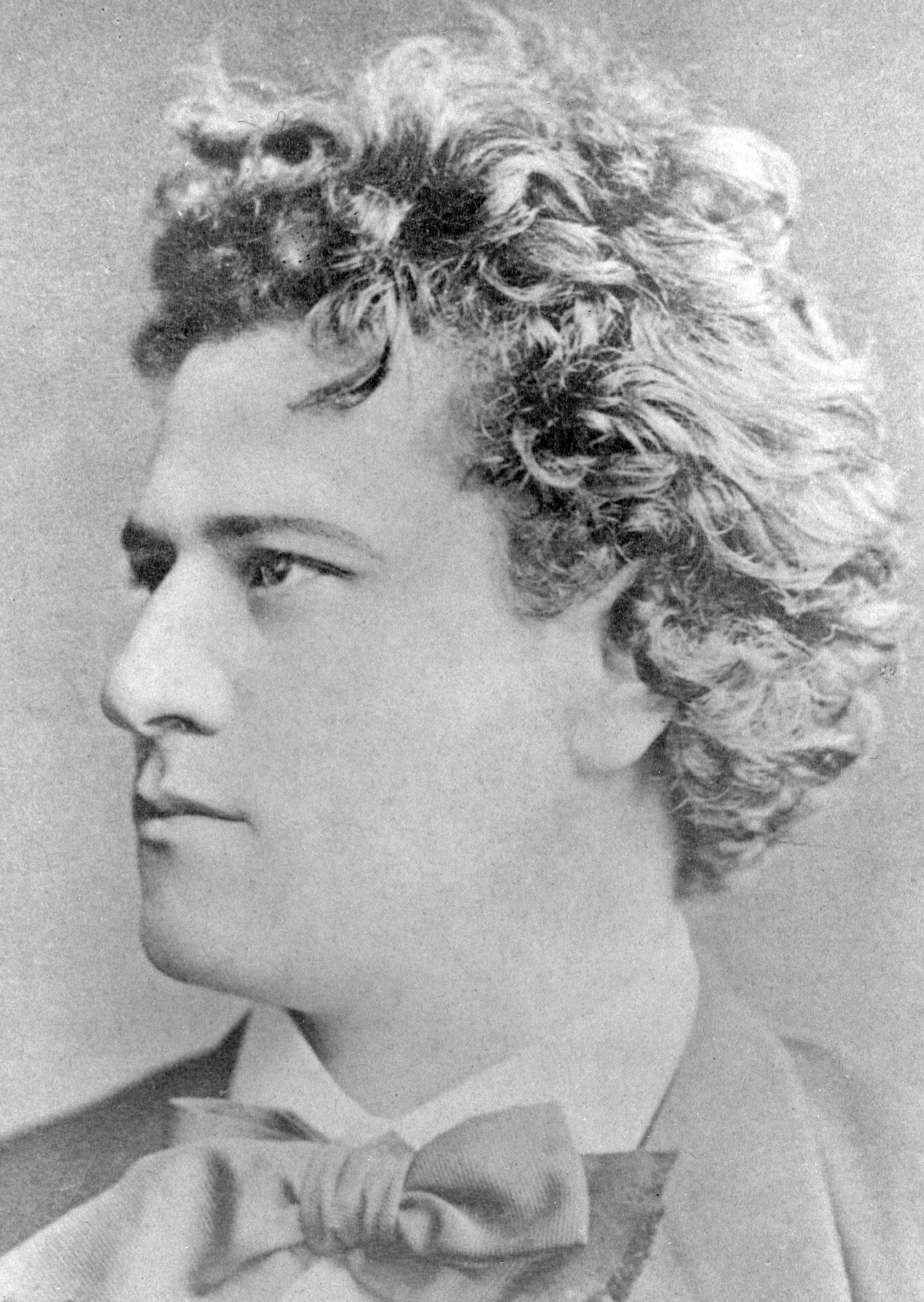
Ludwig Barnay

Ludwig Barnay (1842 – February 1924) was a German stage actor.

== Biography ==
He was born Ludwig (Lajos) Braun at Pest. His father was the secretary general for the local Jewish Community, Ignac Barnay (until 1844: Braun).

In 1857, the fifteen-year-old Barnay secretly left his father's house to study Kosinsky in Schiller's "The Robbers" in Vienna under the lead of Adolf von Sonnenthal. At his father's request, he pursued polytechnic studies to become a master builder. Then he became an accountant in Pest and in 1859 in Kaschau. But his inclination towards the theater was insurmountable and Barnay now turned to it resolutely, ignoring his father's warnings.

He appeared in 1860 at Trutenau and appeared in Pest the following year, after which he had engagements of varying length in Graz, Mainz, Vienna, Prague, Riga, Mainz again, Leipzig, and Weimar, often using the stage name Ludwig Lacroix. His artistic beginnings were considered rather unsuccessful. Later he made his home in Wiesbaden.

In July 1871, on his initiative, the General German Theater Congress met in Weimar, where the foundation for the union of professional actors ("Genossenschaft deutscher Buehnenangehoeriger") was founded in December of the same year.

From 1870 to 1875 he was at the Stadt Theater of Frankfort-on-the-Main, and for the next five years at that of Hamburg, where he acted as director. Several years after that, he traveled as a "star," visiting London in 1881 with the Meiningen Court Company, and in 1882 making a tour of the United States, successful both artistically and financially.

Together with Adolphe L'Arronge and others he founded the Deutsche Theater in Berlin in 1883, but left it in 1884 and returned to his career of a touring guest star. Between 1887 and 1894 he was the artistic director of the Berliner Theater in Berlin (former Walhalla Theater). He gave classical repertoire, with himself in the leading roles((Macbeth, Othello, King Lear etc., at low prices to attract less affluent audiences. Later he made his home in Wiesbaden.

Barnay's greatest talents were shown in tragedy. He excelled in roles such as Essex, Uriel Acosta, Othello, Antony, Tell, and Egmont. He was the leader in the movement which assembled the stage congress at Weimar in 1871, thus being the founder of the "Stage Association" (German: Bühnengenossenschaft) which proved of such value to the German theatrical profession.

In 1864 he married Marie Kreuzer, daughter of Heinrich Kreuzer, tenor at the Vienna Court Opera, and, after getting divorced in 1882, the actress Minnie Arndt.

Ludwig Barnay died in Berlin in February 1924. His memoirs contained an account of his performances, in which he calculated that he had been married on stage 1,721 times and had died 1,120 times.
