= Ludwig II (manga) =

Japanese manga

- English edition of the first volume of Ludwig II as published by Digital Manga Publishing

ルートヴィヒII世 (Rūtovihi II Sei)
- Genre: Historical, Yaoi
- Manga
- Written by: You Higuri
- Published by: Kadokawa Shoten
- English publisher: NA: Digital Manga Publishing
- Original run: 1996 – 1998
- Volumes: 3

Ludwig II (Japanese: ルートヴィヒII世, Hepburn: Rūtovihi II Sei) is a Japanese manga series written and illustrated by You Higuri. It is licensed in North America by Digital Manga Publishing, which released the first volume of the manga on 10 June 2009, and the second on 23 September 2009. It has been licensed in France and Germany by Panini Comics. It fictionalises the story of Ludwig II of Bavaria.

== Release ==
No.	Original release date	Original ISBN	English release date	English ISBN
1	13 March 1996	4-04-852640-5	10 June 2009	978-1-56-970053-2
2	29 May 1997	4-04-852822-X	23 September 2009	978-1-56-970054-9
3	29 October 1998	4-04-853018-6	—	—

== Reception ==
Holly Ellingwood, writing for Active Anime, enjoyed how You Higuri brought historical facts into her story. Casey Brienza, writing for Graphic Novel Reporter, described Ludwig II as being "an updated Rose of Versailles", due to its "bold lines, asymmetrical layouts" and European setting, describing it as being less about the history than about the personalities in that time. Katherine Dacey enjoyed Higuri's "sensual artwork – her languid character designs, sumptuous interiors, and Wagnerian imagery", but disliked the sexual torture of the king's lover, Richard Hornig. Leroy Douresseaux, writing for Comic Book Bin, felt "You Higuri's use of romantic entanglements, sex, and political machinations makes for an excellent, engaging read." and also enjoyed the artwork, noting Higuri's use of toning and sparkling techniques around Ludwig to symbolise the "enchanted fantasy world he wants to inhabit". Melinda Beasi, writing for PopCultureShock, felt that the plot could have been closer to real life, but noted that the "palpable loneliness" of the real Ludwig II does not fit well into the boys love genre.
