= Heinrich Kreuzer =

Austrian tenor singer (1819–1900)

- Born: 16 February 1819 – 26 October 1900; 16 February 1819; Vienna, Austrian Empire
- Died: 26 October 1900 (aged 81); Baden bei Wien, Austria-Hungary
- Other name: Heinrich Kreutzer
- Education: Vienna Conservatory
- Occupation: Tenor
- Years active: 1930s–1856, 1861
- Employers: Vienna Court Opera; Landestheater Coburg; Theater Koblenz
- Style: Classical; opera
- Children: 2

Heinrich Kreuzer (sometimes written as Kreutzer; 16 February 1819 – 26 October 1900) was a well-known Austrian-Jewish opera singer.

== Biography ==
Kreuzer was born in Vienna and received his singing education at the Vienna Conservatory as well as from Giuseppe Ciccimarra. In 1835, he performed at the Theater am Kärntnertor in Vienna, in 1836 in Laibach, and further in Brünn, Frankfurt, Cologne and Mannheim. After two guest appearances in 1844 and 1847, he was engaged by the Vienna Court Opera as Principal Tenor on 19 May 1849. He temporarily retired from singing on 31 March 1856 due to a vocal cord ailment, but returned to perform there from 1 April 1861 to 31 October 1866.

In 1867, he took over the directorship of the Court Theatre in Coburg, and in 1870, that of the municipal theatre in Koblenz. Kreuzer died on 26 October 1900 in Baden bei Wien.

His daughters, Elisabeth ("Elise") and Marie, were also opera singers. Elise's relationship with Prince Paul of Thurn and Taxis, which started in October 1866, caused a major scandal. Their eventual morganatic marriage resulted in her husband having to give up his title and rank and change his name to "Paul von Fels". His younger daughter, Marie (11 March 1839, Salzburg – 7 January 1904, Ulm), married the actor Ludwig Barnay in 1864. The couple divorced in 1880.
