= You Higuri =

Japanese shōjo and yaoi manga artist

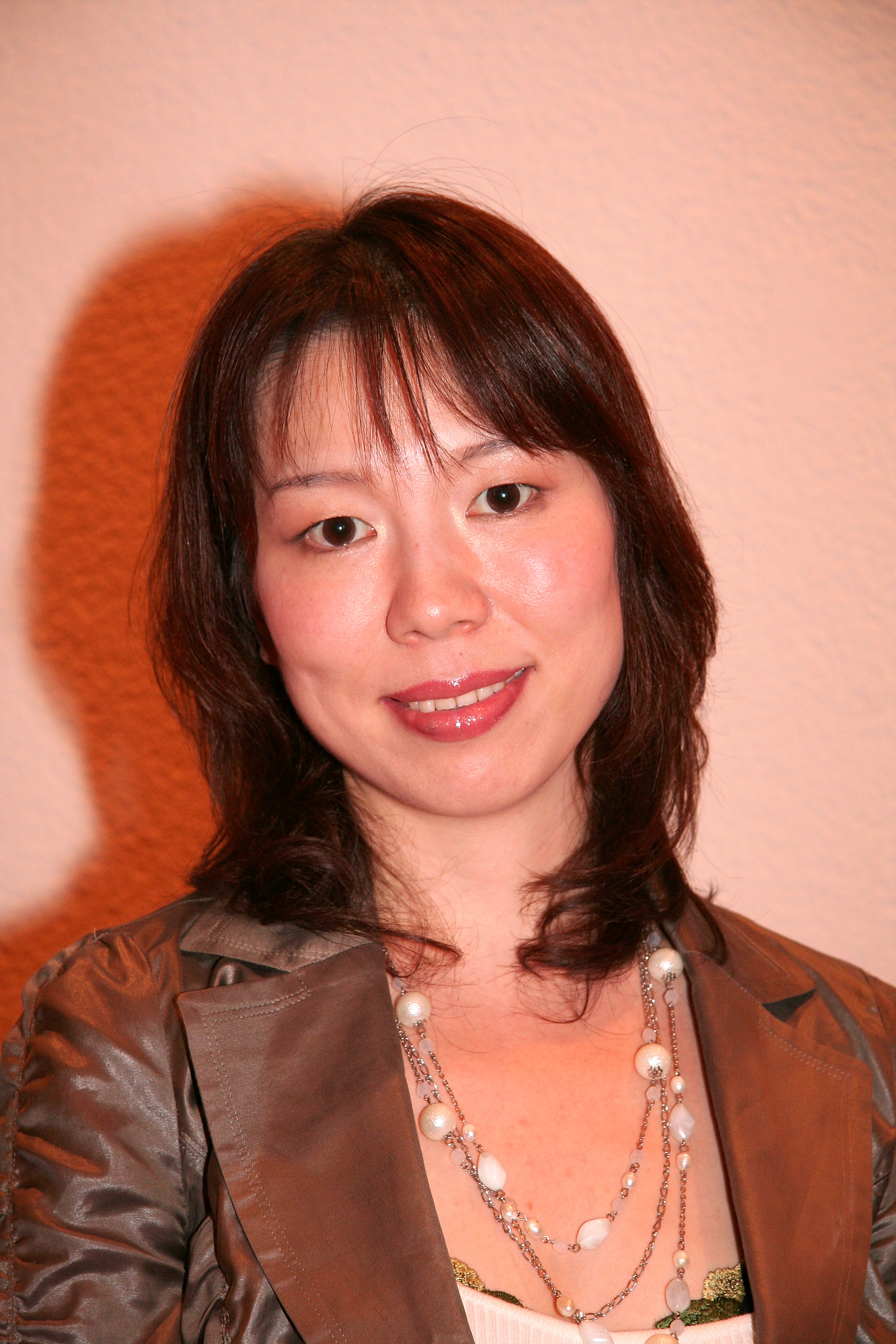
You Higuri

You Higuri (氷栗 優, Higuri Yũ; born October 16 in Osaka, Japan) is a Japanese shōjo and yaoi manga artist who has made several appearances at anime and manga conventions in the United States, as well as in Germany. Her first U.S. appearance was at the initial Yaoi-Con in San Francisco in 2001 (Yaoi-Con 2001, 3). She is known especially for her drawings of beautiful fantasy men in romantic storylines set in historical Europe, such as Gorgeous Carat in early 20th-century France and Cantarella during the Italian Renaissance.

Her comic art influences include Osamu Tezuka, Hayao Miyazaki, and the Showa 24 generation of women manga artists led by Moto Hagio who created girls' comics in the 1970s (Yaoi-Con 2001, 3; Higuri Q & A, 2004). She has also found inspiration in Franco-Belgian comics or bandes dessinées.

== Published works ==
(This list does not include her dōjinshi or self-published comics.)

- Azel Seimaden, 1994 - prequel to Seimaden
- Sento no Hishin, 1994
- Seimaden (聖魔伝), 1994–1999
- Lost Angel, 1996
- Ludwig II 1996–1998
- Kamen no Romanesque (Mask of Romance), 1997 - Not written by artist; based on a Takarazuka Revue play.
- Zoku: Cutlass, 1997–1998
- Zeus, 1997–1998
- Ramen Ikaga!? 1995 (original) & 1997
- Shinkyoku (Divine Comedy), 1998
- Gorgeous Carat: Virtue of Darkness, 1999–2002 - A young French nobleman finds himself caught up in the maneuvers of the famous jewel thief Noir.
- Tenshi no Hitsugi: Ave Maria (Angel's Coffin: Ave Maria), 2000
- Tenshi ni Bara no Hanataba o (Rose Bouquet for an Angel), 2000–2001 (also called: L'alleluja des Anges) - Sei turns into a girl when he is around white roses. Only a kiss will change him back.
- Cutlass: Shōnen tachi no toki (Cutlass: A Time for Boys), 2000 - pirate manga
- Poison artbook, 2000 - Color and monochrome illustrations from Seimaden, Ludwig II, Gorgeous Carat, and other manga.
- Cantarella, 2000–2010
- Flower, 2001
- My Little Lover, 2002
- Gorgeous Carat Galaxy, 2004 - One-shot sequel to Gorgeous Carat.
- Gakuen Heaven (School Heaven), 2004 - A scenario from SPRAY's "Boy's Love Scramble!" game.
- Taisho Era Chronicles, 2005
- Crown, 2005–2008 - Art only; writer Shinji Wada.
- Night Head Genesis anime, 2006 - Did character design.
- Night Head Genesis manga, 2006 - vols. 1, 2, and 3
- Jewel artbook, 2006
