= Erich Böhlke =

German conductor and composer

Erich Böhlke (9 September 1895 – 19 April 1979) was a German conductor and composer.

== Life ==
Böhlke was born as the son of an art dealer in Szczecin. Already as a child and teenager he made his mark musically. So from 1909, he directed the Stettin male choral society Melodia. Böhlke first prepared himself for the profession of a teacher by attending the Präparandenanstalt in Maszewo and then the teachers' seminar in Pölitz. During the First World War he served on the Eastern Front. He passed the 2nd teacher's exam, but then he devoted himself entirely to music.

From 1919 he studied at the Berlin University of the Arts. In 1924 he became bandmaster at the Theater Rudolstadt. Further stations were from 1926 musical director at the Theater Koblenz and from 1929 chief conductor at the Staatstheater Wiesbaden. In 1934, he became general music director and artistic director of the Stadttheater Magdeburg. There he was replaced as artistic director by a party member in 1939, but remained general music director until the war-related closure in 1944.

After the Second World War he was General Music Director of the Staatstheater Oldenburg from 1947 to 1950. From 1950 he worked as a freelance musician. During this time he was, among other things, guest conductor at the Tōkyō Geijutsu Daigaku, where he was awarded the title of honorary professor in 1963.

Böhlke was also active as a composer and composed over 100 songs, among other things. He died in Delmenhorst at the age of 83 and was buried in the family grave at the sterholzer Friedhof in Bremen. (in German)

== Literature ==
- Gerd Lüpke: Erich Böhlke. Porträt eines pommerschen Musikers. In Pommern. Issue 3/1970, ISSN 0032-4167. Neu abgedruckt in Die Pommersche Zeitung. Nr. 25/2013, pp. 12–13.
- Eckhard Wendt: Stettiner Lebensbilder (Veröffentlichungen der Historische Kommission für Pommern. Series V, vol. 40). Böhlau, Cologne/Weimar/Vienna 2004, ISBN 3-412-09404-8, pp. 86–88.
- Festschrift für Erich Böhlke zum 75. Geburtstag 9. September 1970.
- Werkverzeichnis Erich Böhlke.
- Das heute geltende Pachtrecht.
- Gedarken um Schostakasitsch und seine Zehrte.
