= Maximilian Karl, 6th Prince of Thurn and Taxis =

Maximilian Karl
- Prince of Thurn and Taxis
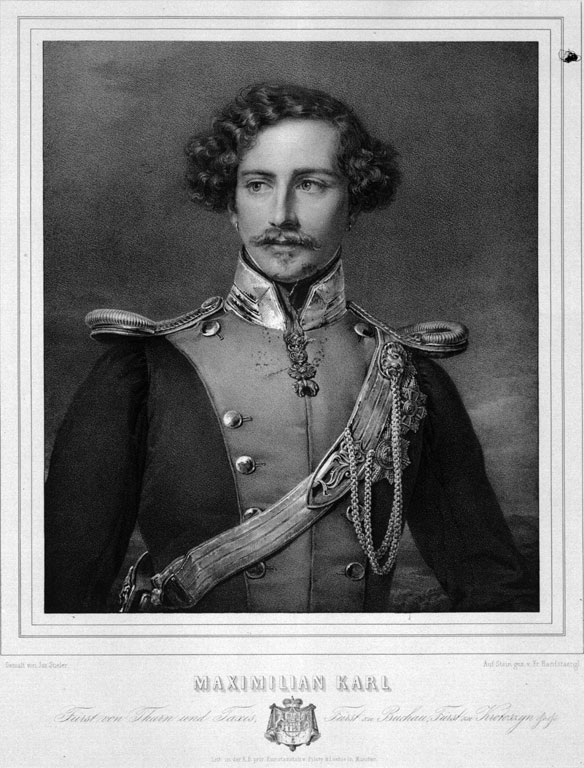

Head of the House of Thurn and Taxis
- Period: 15 July 1827 – 10 November 1871
- Predecessor: Karl Alexander
- Successor: Maximilian Maria
- Born: 3 November 1802; Regensburg, Electorate of Bavaria, Kingdom of Germany, Holy Roman Empire
- Died: 10 November 1871 (aged 69); Regensburg, Kingdom of Bavaria
- Burial: Gruftkapelle, Saint Emmeram's Abbey, Regensburg
- Spouse: Baroness Wilhelmine of Dörnberg (m. 1828; died 1835) Princess Mathilde Sophie of Oettingen-Spielberg (m. 1839)
- Issue: Prince Karl Wilhelm; Princess Therese Mathilde; Maximilian Anton, Hereditary Prince of Thurn and Taxis; Prince Egon; Prince Theodor; Prince Otto; Prince Georg; Prince Paul; Princess Amalie; Prince Hugo; Prince Gustav; Prince Wilhelm; Prince Adolf; Prince Franz; Prince Nikolaus; Prince Alfred; Princess Marie Georgine
Names
- German: Maximilian Karl
- House: Thurn and Taxis
- Father: Karl Alexander, 5th Prince of Thurn and Taxis
- Mother: Duchess Therese of Mecklenburg-Strelitz

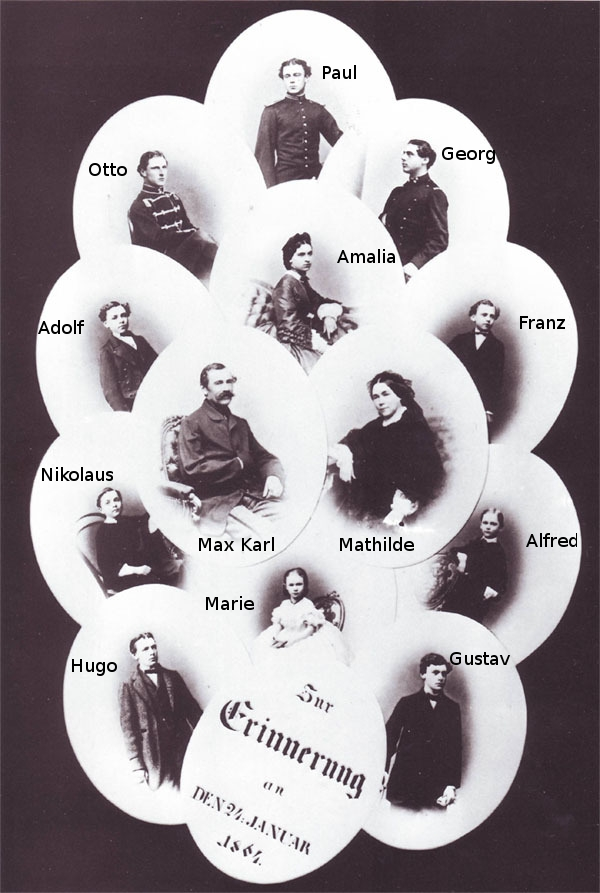
Maximilian Karl and Mathilde Sophie with their family at the occasion of their silver wedding anniversary on 24 January 1864.

Maximilian Karl, 6th Prince of Thurn and Taxis, full German name: Maximilian Karl Fürst von Thurn und Taxis (3 November 1802 – 10 November 1871) was the sixth Prince of Thurn and Taxis, head of the Thurn-und-Taxis-Post, and Head of the Princely House of Thurn and Taxis from 15 July 1827 until his death on 10 November 1871.

== Early life, education, and military career ==
Maximilian Karl was the fourth child of Karl Alexander, 5th Prince of Thurn and Taxis and his mother Duchess Therese of Mecklenburg-Strelitz, sister of Queen Louise of Prussia and niece of Queen Charlotte. He was born on 3 November 1802 in the so-called Inner Palace of St. Emmeram's Abbey.

At the age of nine, Maximilian Karl became Under Lieutenant in Bayer's Fourth Bayerrischen Cheveaulegers-Regiment König. After four years of education at Bildungsinstitut Hofwyl, a Swiss educational institution, he joined the Bavarian army on 25 August 1822. After the death of his father in 1827, Maximilian Karl asked for his dismissal from the army. Afterwards, he continued with his new role as head of the House of Thurn and Taxis, with the advisement and support of his mother.

== Marriage and family ==
Maximilian Karl married Baroness Wilhelmine of Dörnberg, younger daughter of Ernst, Baron of Dörnberg, Director of the royal chamber of Brandenburg-Ansbach, and his wife, Baroness Wilhelmine Henriette Maximiliane of Glauburg, on 24 August 1828 in Regensburg. Maximilian Karl and Wilhelmine had five children:

- Prince Karl Wilhelm of Thurn and Taxis (14 April 1829 – 21 July 1829)
- Princess Therese Mathilde of Thurn and Taxis (31 August 1830 – 10 September 1883), married firstly Duke Alfred von Beaufort-Spontin (1816-1888), married secondly Wilhelm von Pirch (d. 1881)
- Maximilian Anton Lamoral, Hereditary Prince of Thurn and Taxis (28 September 1831 – 26 June 1867), married Duchess Helene in Bavaria and had issue
- Prince Egon of Thurn and Taxis (17 November 1832 – 8 February 1892), married Viktoria Edelspacher de Gyorok (1841-1895) and had issue
- Prince Theodor of Thurn and Taxis (9 February 1834 – 1 March 1876), married Baroness Melanie von Seckendorff (1841-1919) and had issue

In their seventh year of marriage, Wilhelmine died at the age of 32. Maximilian Karl mourned her death greatly and constructed the Neo-Gothic mausoleum at St. Emmeram's Abbey for her. Maximilian Karl married secondly to Princess Mathilde Sophie of Oettingen-Spielberg, daughter of Johannes Aloysius III, Prince of Oettingen-Spielberg and his wife, Princess Amalie Auguste of Wrede, on 24 January 1839 in Oettingen in Bayern. Maximilian Karl and Mathilde Sophie had twelve children:

- Prince Otto of Thurn and Taxis (28 May 1840 – 6 July 1876), married Maria de Fontelive-Vergne (1842-1878), created Baroness von Pernstein by the King of Bavaria on 1 August 1867 and had issue
- Prince Georg of Thurn and Taxis (11 July 1841 – 22 December 1874), married morganatically Anna Frühwirth (1841-1884), no issue
- Prince Paul of Thurn and Taxis (27 May 1843 – 10 March 1879), married morganatically Elize Kreutzer and had issue
- Princess Amalie of Thurn and Taxis (12 May 1844 – 12 February 1867), married Count Otto von Rechberg und Rothenlöwen zu Hohenrechberg (1833-1918)
- Prince Hugo of Thurn and Taxis (24 November 1845 – 15 May 1873)
- Prince Gustav of Thurn and Taxis (23 February 1848 – 9 July 1914), married Princess Karoline von Thurn und Taxis (1846-1931), no issue
- Prince Wilhelm of Thurn and Taxis (20 February 1849 – 11 December 1849)
- Prince Adolf of Thurn and Taxis (26 May 1850 – 3 January 1890), married Countess Franziska Grimaud von Orsay (1857-1919) and had issue
- Prince Franz of Thurn and Taxis (2 March 1852 – 4 May 1897), married Countess Theresia Grimaud von Orsay (1861-1947) and had issue
- Prince Nikolaus of Thurn and Taxis (2 August 1853 – 26 May 1874)
- Prince Alfred of Thurn and Taxis (11 June 1856 – 9 February 1886)
- Princess Marie Georgine of Thurn and Taxis (25 December 1857 – 13 February 1909), who married, as his second wife, Wilhelm, 4th Prince of Waldburg-Zeil.

In 1843, Maximilian Karl and his family moved to the newly constructed Donaustauf palace of the Thurn and Taxis family in Donaustauf, which was completed in the same year as the nearby Walhalla. The Donaustauf palace was completely destroyed during a blaze on 4 March 1880.

== Postal career ==
In 1827, Maximilian Karl was his father's successor as head of the private Thurn-und-Taxis-Post which had its headquarters in Frankfurt am Main. With the annexation of the Free City of Frankfurt by the Kingdom of Prussia in 1866 and the forced sale of Thurn-und-Taxis-Post for three million Thalers ended the era of the Thurn and Taxis family's postal monopoly. The handover took place on 1 July 1867.

== Death ==
Prince Maximilian Karl died in Regensburg, on 10 November 1871, at the age of 69. His second wife Mathilde Sophie survived him by 15 years, dying in 1886. Maximilian's body was buried in the Gruftkapelle, St.Emmeram, Regensburg, Germany, alongside both his wives.

== Orders and decorations ==
- Kingdom of Hanover: Grand Cross of the Royal Hanoverian Guelphic Order, 1831
- Kingdom of Prussia: Knight of the Order of the Black Eagle, 23 August 1851

Maximilian Karl, 6th Prince of Thurn and Taxis House of Thurn and Taxis Cadet branch of the House of Tassis Born: 3 November 1802 Died: 10 November 1871
German nobility
Preceded by Karl Alexander	Prince of Thurn and Taxis; 15 July 1827 – 10 November 1871	Succeeded by Maximilian Maria
Postal offices
Preceded by Karl Alexander	Postmaster General of the Thurn-und-Taxis-Post; 15 July 1827–1867	Succeeded by Thurn-und-Taxis-Post cedes control of its postal system to the Kingdom of Prussia
