= Princess Mathilde Sophie of Oettingen-Spielberg =

German nobility and princess consort (1816–1886)

Princess Mathilde Sophie
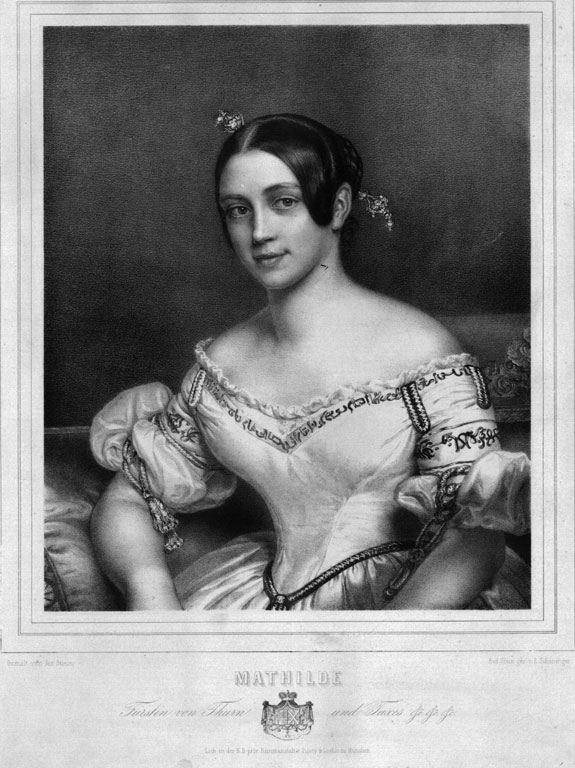
- Portrait, c. 1839

Princess consort of Thurn and Taxis
- Tenure: 24 January 1839 – 10 November 1871
- Born: 9 February 1816; Oettingen, Kingdom of Bavaria
- Died: 20 January 1886 (aged 69); Obermais, Meran, County of Tyrol, Austria-Hungary
- Burial: Gruftkapelle, Saint Emmeram's Abbey, Regensburg
- Spouse: Maximilian Karl, 6th Prince of Thurn and Taxis (m. 1839; died 1871)
- Issue: Prince Otto; Prince Georg; Prince Paul; Princess Amalie; Prince Hugo; Prince Gustav; Prince Wilhelm; Prince Adolf; Prince Franz; Prince Nikolaus; Prince Alfred; Princess Marie Georgine
Names
- German: Mathilde Sophie
- House: Oettingen-Spielberg
- Father: Johannes Aloysius III, Prince of Oettingen-Spielberg
- Mother: Princess Amalie Auguste of Wrede

Princess Mathilde Sophie of Oettingen-Oettingen and Oettingen-Spielberg (German: Mathilde Sophie, Prinzessin zu Oettingen-Oettingen und Oettingen-Spielberg; 9 February 1816 – 20 January 1886) was a member of the princely House of Oettingen-Spielberg by birth. Through her marriage to Maximilian Karl, 6th Prince of Thurn and Taxis, she became a member of the House of Thurn and Taxis and served as the princess consort of the house from 1839 until 1871.

== Family ==
Mathilde Sophie was born on 9 February 1816 in Oettingen, Kingdom of Bavaria, as the eldest daughter and second child of Johannes Aloysius III, Prince of Oettingen-Spielberg, and his wife, Princess Amalie Auguste von Wrede. Through her mother, she was a granddaughter of the Bavarian field marshal, Prince Karl Philipp von Wrede. She spent her formative youth raised at her family's ancestral Bavarian estates and received a private home education overseen by tutors.

== Marriage and issue ==
On 24 January 1839, Princess Mathilde Sophie married Maximilian Karl, 6th Prince of Thurn and Taxis in Oettingen. She became his second wife following the 1835 death of his first spouse, Baroness Wilhelmine of Dörnberg.

The marriage produced twelve children:

- Prince Otto of Thurn and Taxis (1840–1876), married Maria de Fontelive-Vergne in 1867 and had issue.
- Prince Georg of Thurn and Taxis (1841–1874), married morganatically Anna Frühwirth in 1870 without issue.
- Prince Paul of Thurn and Taxis (1843–1879), married morganatically Elize Kreutzer in 1868 and had issue.
- Princess Amalie of Thurn and Taxis (1844–1867), married Count Otto von Rechberg und Rothenlöwen zu Hohenrechberg in 1865 and had no issue.
- Prince Hugo of Thurn and Taxis (1845–1873).
- Prince Gustav of Thurn and Taxis (1848–1914), married Princess Karoline von Thurn und Taxis in 1877 without issue.
- Prince Wilhelm of Thurn and Taxis (1849–1849)
- Prince Adolf of Thurn and Taxis (1850–1890), married Countess Franziska Grimaud von Orsay in 1875 and had issue.
- Prince Franz of Thurn and Taxis (1852–1897), married Countess Theresia Grimaud von Orsay in 1883 and had issue.
- Prince Nikolaus of Thurn and Taxis (1853–1874)
- Prince Alfred of Thurn and Taxis (1856–1886)
- Princess Marie Georgine of Thurn and Taxis (1857–1909), married Wilhelm, 4th Prince of Waldburg-Zeil in 1889 and had issue.

Princess Mathilde Sophie died on 20 January 1886 at the age of 69 in Obermais, Meran, within the County of Tyrol, Austria-Hungary. She was interred in the family vault at the Gruftkapelle within Saint Emmeram's Abbey in Regensburg, Germany, alongside her husband.

== Court life and patronage ==
Following her marriage, Mathilde Sophie assumed extensive administrative and charitable obligations as the female head of the court at St. Emmeram Palace. She managed the integrated household that included her husband's surviving children from his first marriage alongside her own extensive issue, stabilizing the domestic affairs of the princely house during a period of dynastic transition.

A devout Roman Catholic, she acted as a prominent religious and philanthropic patron within the Regensburg region, financially sponsoring local charitable institutions, hospitals, and parochial schools attached to Saint Emmeram's Abbey. Her domestic oversight directly influenced the formative education of her sons, notably Prince Paul, who later became the close personal confidant of King Ludwig II of Bavaria.

== Ancestry ==
Ancestors of Princess Mathilde Sophie of Oettingen-Spielberg

8. Anton Ernst, Prince of Oettingen-Spielberg
4. Johannes Aloysius II, Prince of Oettingen-Spielberg
9. Countess Maria Theresia Walpurga of Waldburg-Zeil-Trauchburg
2. Johannes Aloysius III, Prince of Oettingen-Spielberg
10. Karl Joseph Anton, Prince of Auersperg
5. Princess Maria Aloysia of Auersperg
11. Countess Maria Josepha Rosalie von Trautson
1. Princess Mathilde Sophie of Oettingen-Spielberg
12. Baron Ferdinand Josef von Wrede
6. Carl Philipp Joseph, 1st Prince of Wrede
13. Anna Katharina Jünger
3. Princess Amalie Auguste of Wrede
14. Count Friedrich Joseph von Wiser-Siegelsbach
7. Sophie Aloysia Agathe von Wiser-Siegelsbach
15. Johanna Aqathe von Schweitzer

== Bibliography ==
- Huberty, Michel (1988). L'Allemagne dynastique: Les quinze dynasties de l'Empire (in French). Vol. 5. Le Perreux-sur-Marne: Alain Giraud.
- Zedlitz-Neukirch, Leopold von (1837). "Oettingen". Neues preussisches Adels-Lexicon (in German). Vol. 4. Leipzig: Gebrüder Reichenbach.

Princess Mathilde Sophie of Oettingen-Spielberg House of Oettingen-Spielberg Cadet branch of the House of Oettingen-Wallerstein Born: 9 February 1816 Died: 20 January 1886
German nobility
| Preceded by Baroness Wilhelmine of Dörnberg | Princess consort of Thurn and Taxis; 24 January 1839 – 10 November 1871 | Succeeded by Archduchess Margarethe Klementine of Austria |
