= Princess Maria Theresa of Braganza =

Maria Teresa
- Princess Karl Ludwig of Thurn and Taxis
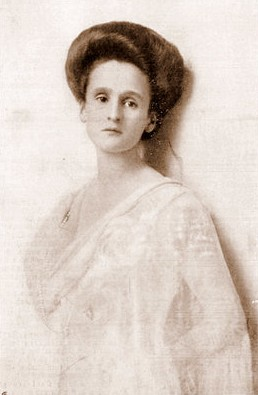
- Born: 26 January 1881; Ödenburg, Austria-Hungary
- Died: 17 January 1945 (aged 63); Stainach, Nazi Germany
- Spouse: Prince Karl Ludwig of Thurn and Taxis (m. 1900; died 1942)
- Issue: Prince Maximilian
Names
- Maria Teresa Carolina Micaela Ana Josefina Antónia Francisca de Assis e de Paula Brígida Pia Gerardina Severina Inácia Luísa Estanislau Joana Policarpa de Bragança
- House: Braganza
- Father: Prince Miguel, Duke of Braganza
- Mother: Princess Elisabeth of Thurn and Taxis

Princess Maria Theresa of Braganza (26 January 1881 – 17 January 1945) was a member of the House of Braganza. Through her marriage to Prince Karl Ludwig of Thurn and Taxis, Maria Theresa was also a member of the House of Thurn and Taxis.

== Family ==
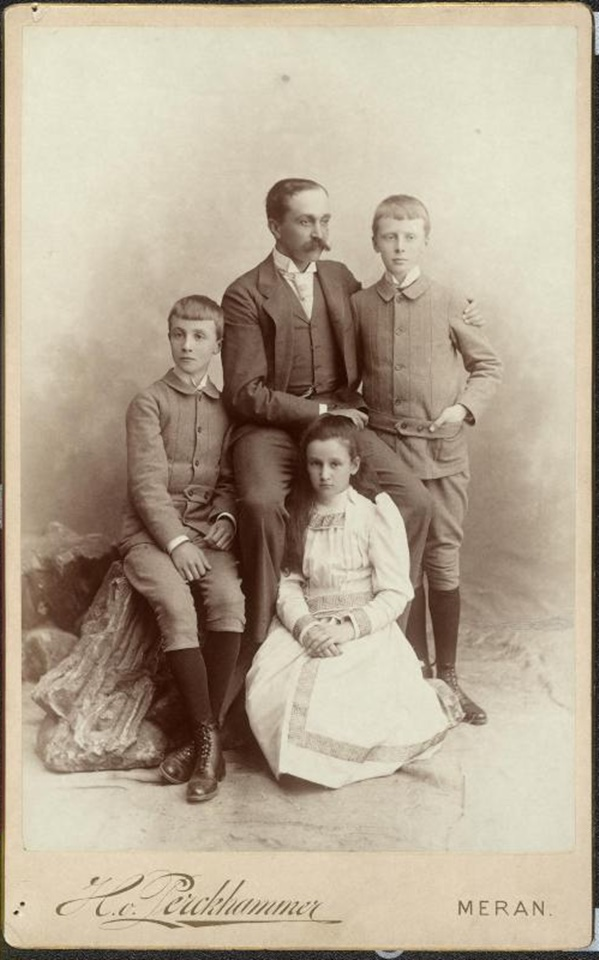
Princess Maria Theresa with her father and brothers Miguel (right) and Francis Joseph (left)

Maria Theresa was born in Ödenburg, Austria-Hungary (now Sopron, Hungary), the only daughter of the Miguelist pretender to the Portuguese throne Miguel Januário, Duke of Braganza and his first wife Princess Elisabeth of Thurn and Taxis. Maria Theresa's father was the head of the non-reigning branch of the Portuguese Royal House that had been exiled from Portugal. The exile was the result of the Portuguese law of banishment of 1834 and the constitution of 1838 which was brought about because his grandfather Miguel I of Portugal had in 1828 usurped the throne of Portugal from Queen Maria II. Her grandfather reigned as king until 1834 when Maria II was restored.

== Marriage and issue ==
Styles of Princess Maria Theresa of Thurn and Taxis
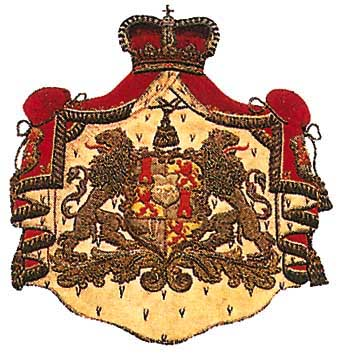
- Reference style: Her Royal Highness
- Spoken style: Your Royal Highness

Maria Theresa married Prince Karl Ludwig of Thurn and Taxis (1863–1942), a member of the Czech branch of the family, son of Prince Maximilian Karl Friedrich of Thurn and Taxis and his wife Amélie Eugénie de Tascher de La Pagerie, on 22 May 1900 in Regensburg, Bavaria, Germany. Maria Theresa and Karl Ludwig had one son:

- Prince Maximilian of Thurn and Taxis (1913–1928)

== Ancestry ==
Ancestors of Princess Maria Theresa of Braganza

8. John VI of Portugal
4. Miguel I of Portugal
9. Infanta Carlota Joaquina of Spain
2. Miguel Januário, Duke of Braganza
10. Constantine, Hereditary Prince of Löwenstein
5. Princess Adelaide of Löwenstein
11. Princess Agnes of Hohenlohe-Langenburg
1. Princess Maria Theresa of Braganza
12. Maximilian Karl, Prince of Thurn and Taxis
6. Maximilian Anton, Hereditary Prince of Thurn and Taxis
13. Baroness Wilhelmine of Dörnberg
3. Princess Elisabeth of Thurn and Taxis
14. Duke Maximilian Joseph in Bavaria
7. Duchess Helene in Bavaria
15. Princess Ludovika of Bavaria
