= Prince Francis Joseph of Braganza =

Austro-Hungarian Army officer (1879–1919)

Francisco José de Bragança
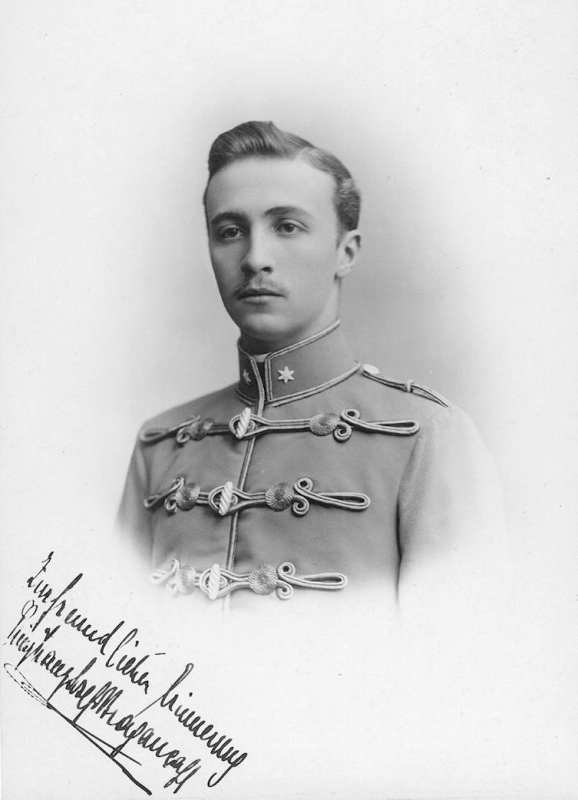
- Born: 7 September 1879; Meran, Tyrol, Cisleithania, Austria-Hungary
- Died: 15 June 1919 (aged 39); Ischia, Italy
Names
- Francisco José Gerardo Maria Jorge Humberto António Henrique Miguel Rafael Gabriel de Bragança
- House: House of Braganza
- Father: Miguel Januário, Duke of Braganza
- Mother: Princess Elisabeth of Thurn and Taxis

Prince Francis Joseph of Braganza (Portuguese: Príncipe Francisco José de Bragança; 7 September 1879 – 15 June 1919) was a member of the exiled branch of House of Braganza and an officer in the Austro-Hungarian Army. During his life he was involved in a number of incidents ranging from sex scandals to swindles.

== Early life ==
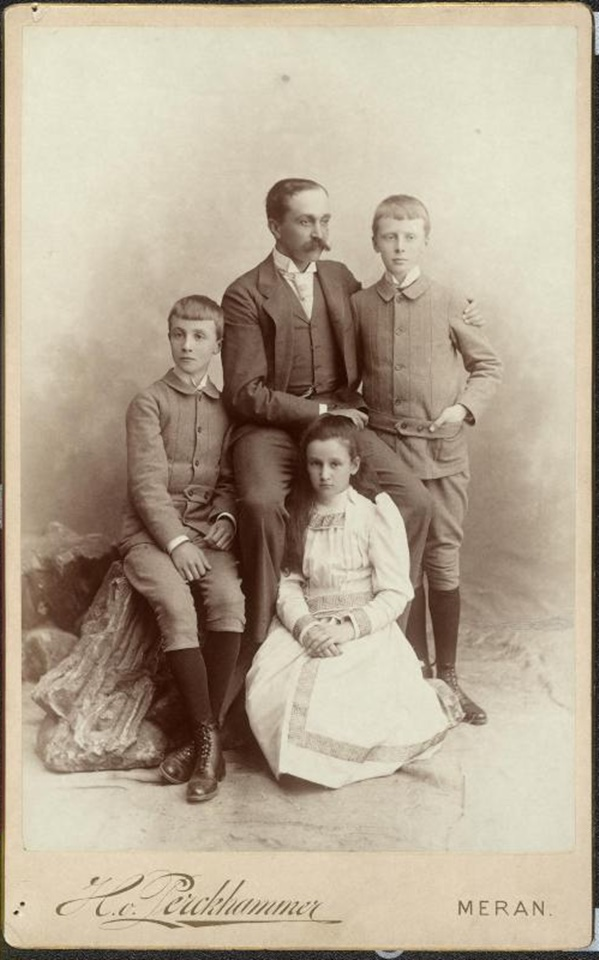
Prince Francis Joseph (left) with his father, brother Miguel and sister Maria Teresa

Francis Joseph (Note: His full given names were Francis Joseph Gerard Maria George Humbert Anthony Henry Michael Rafael Gabriel (Portuguese: Francisco José Gerardo Maria Jorge Humberto António Henrique Miguel Rafael Gabriel).) was born in Meran, Austria (now in Italy), the second son of the Miguelist pretender to the Portuguese throne Miguel Januário, Duke of Braganza and his first wife Princess Elisabeth of Thurn and Taxis. He was the namesake of his godfather Emperor Francis Joseph I of Austria. His elder brother, Prince Miguel, Duke of Viseu, was married to the American Anita Stewart. In order to get the consent of his father to marry Anita, his brother Dom Miguel had to renounce all claim to the throne of Portugal in favor of Prince Francis Joseph.

Francis Joseph's father was the head of the non reigning branch of the Portuguese Royal House that had been exiled from Portugal. The exile was the result of the Portuguese law of banishment of 1834 and the constitution of 1838 which was brought about because his grandfather, King Miguel I of Portugal, had in 1828 usurped the throne of Portugal from Queen Maria II. His grandfather reigned as king until 1834 when Maria II was restored.

== Career ==
Like his father, Francis Joseph pursued a career in the Austro-Hungarian Army. In October 1900, while a lieutenant in the Hussars he was disciplined by his godfather the Austrian Emperor Francis Joseph, after he issued a challenge to an old colonel who called him to account for a breach of Army regulations. As a result, he was removed from the Hussars and transferred to a regiment of Dragoons and sent to carry out policing duties in the barren, poverty stricken villages along the Austrian-Russian frontier.

=== Royalist fighter ===
In 1911–12 Francis Joseph participated in the monarchist uprisings in northern Portugal led by Henrique Mitchell de Paiva Couceiro, in an unsuccessful attempt to overthrow the First Portuguese Republic. After his father and older brother offered to give up their claim to the Portuguese throne in an attempt to unite the monarchist support behind the deposed King Manuel II, Prince Francis Joseph was hailed as a leader of the Royalist cause by a number of Miguelist supporters and was seen as a rival to the deposed king in the event of a restoration.

During World War I, Francis Joseph fought in the Austro-Hungarian Army and was captured. He was imprisoned on the island of Ischia, near Naples, where he died of heart failure on 15 June 1919.

== Personal life ==
In August 1902, Prince Francis Joseph was in London to attend the coronation of King Edward VII of the United Kingdom as a member of the Austro-Hungarian mission. On 11 September he was indicted in the Central Criminal Court on a charge that he had committed an act of gross indecency with a fifteen-year-old boy. A 24-year-old man and a seventeen-year-old boy were also charged with conspiring together to procure the commission of an act of gross indecency. In opening the case, the prosecution said "the offense with which the prince was charged was far too common in London." The Prince was defended by Sir Edward Clarke, the former Solicitor General. (Note: Sir Edward Clarke represented Oscar Wilde in his disastrous prosecution of the Marquess of Queensberry for libel, and representing the plaintiff in the "baccarat case", during which Sir Edward cross-examined the Prince of Wales.) A witness falsely claimed that he had made a hole in a bedroom door and that through the hole he had seen Francis Joseph and the fifteen-year-old boy engaged in sexual activity in a house in Lambeth. The witness's lies were undone by the police investigation. The police found that only nine inches of the bed were visible through the hole and therefore the witness could not have seen the matters as to which he had testified. The prosecutors therefore moved for a verdict of no guilt declaring that there was no evidence of guilt and the jury indeed pronounced Prince Francis Joseph not guilty.

After the acquittal, his lawyer stated that the Prince had gone to the house "under the impression that it was a brothel and that a woman would be waiting for him there. It was not uncommon on the Continent for men and boys to go about touting to take men to brothels." The other man and the two boys were found guilty of conspiring together to procure the commission of an act of gross indecency. The man was sentenced to two years imprisonment, and the boys to ten and eight months each.

As a result of this indiscretion Francis Joseph was forced to resign his commission as a Lieutenant in the Seventh Hussars of the Austro-Hungarian Army. The prince was adjudged by an Austrian court to be of unsound mind and, for his protection, placed his affairs in the hands of a trustee, his brother-in-law, Prince Charles Louis of Thurn und Taxis. Francis Joseph was later implicated in another homosexual incident in Austria.

=== Victim of a swindle ===
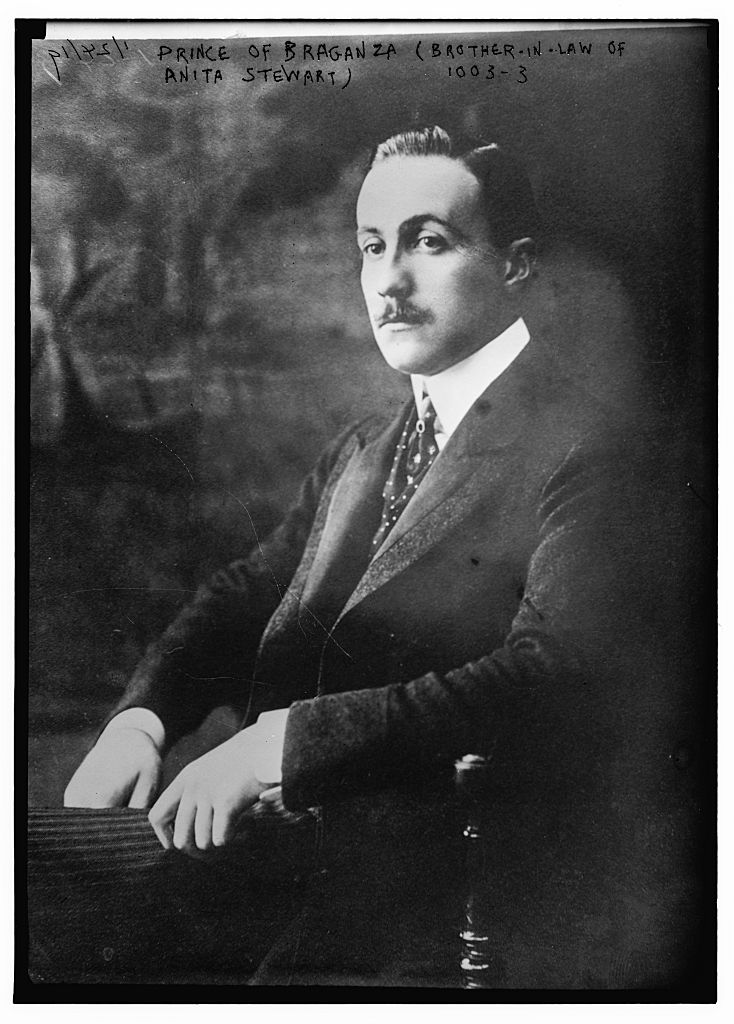
Francis Joseph of Braganza

In November 1909, Prince Francis Joseph had £325,000 swindled from him after purchasing what he believed to be valuable emeralds and shares in an English mining company, by an impostor passing himself off as Frederick Dennehey Vanderbilt of the famous Vanderbilt family. The impostor, whose real name was William Lackerstein Joachim, first met the Prince in Paris in April 1909 and a month later Joachim traveled to Vienna where he threw a dinner for him. Joachim managed to convince Francis Joseph of his credentials as an astute financier. As Prince Francis Joseph's affairs had been placed in the hands of a trustee and he was only given an allowance, he saw a friendship with supposed millionaire member of the Vanderbilt family as a good way to boost his finances. In October after he returned from a trip abroad, he received a number of business proposals where Joachim told him that he had recently acquired a large number of emeralds and that because he would allow him to purchase the emeralds for a good price, whereby he could then sell them for a substantial profit.

The deal was held up after Prince Francis Joseph did not show up for an arranged meeting at a banquet. After an emissary informed Joachim that Francis Joseph's father had summoned him to his castle in Seebenstein, Joachim feared that he had been tricked. However, the next day he received a letter from the Prince in which he revealed his annoyance at being unable to attend.

Joachim and Prince Francis Joseph next met in Berlin a week later to conclude the emerald deal. However, during the delay Joachim had come up with a way to swindle more money out of the Prince. While in Berlin, he introduced Francis Joseph to two supposed mining engineers. The two engineers made a good impression on the Prince, so Joachim managed to get him to part with more money by acquiring shares in the mining company that he said he was the majority shareholder of. A total of £325,000, £125,000 for the emeralds and £200,000 for the shares.

As the emeralds and shares turned out to be worthless Prince Francis Joseph decided to prosecute criminally through the Austrian embassy in London. The majority of his money was recovered.

== Death ==
During the First World War, Franz Joseph fought in the Austro-Hungarian Army and was taken prisoner. He was held on the island of Ischia, near Naples, where he died of heart failure, unmarried and without issue.

== Ancestry ==
Ancestors of Prince Francis Joseph of Braganza

8. John VI of Portugal
4. Miguel I of Portugal
9. Infanta Carlota Joaquina of Spain
2. Miguel Januário, Duke of Braganza
10. Constantine, Hereditary Prince of Löwenstein
5. Princess Adelaide of Löwenstein
11. Princess Agnes of Hohenlohe-Langenburg
1. Prince Francisco José of Braganza
12. Maximilian Karl, Prince of Thurn and Taxis
6. Maximilian Anton, Hereditary Prince of Thurn and Taxis
13. Baroness Wilhelmine of Dörnberg
3. Princess Elisabeth of Thurn and Taxis
14. Duke Maximilian Joseph in Bavaria
7. Duchess Helene in Bavaria
15. Princess Ludovika of Bavaria
