= Miguel of Portugal (disambiguation) =

Miguel of Portugal (English: Michael) is the name of one Portuguese king and other members of the Portuguese Royal Family:

== Kings ==
- Miguel I of Portugal (1802–1866)

== Infantes ==
- Miguel, Infante of Portugal (1384–1385), alleged son of Beatrice of Portugal
- Miguel da Paz, Prince of Portugal (1498–1500), son of Manuel I of Portugal
- Miguel, Prince of Beira (1820), son of Peter IV of Portugal
- Miguel, Duke of Braganza (1853–1927), son of Miguel I of Portugal
- Prince Miguel, Duke of Viseu (1878–1923), son of Miguel, Duke of Braganza
