= Princess Elisabeth of Thurn and Taxis (1860–1881) =

Duchess of Braganza (1860–1881)

Elisabeth of Thurn and Taxis
- Duchess of Braganza (miguelist)
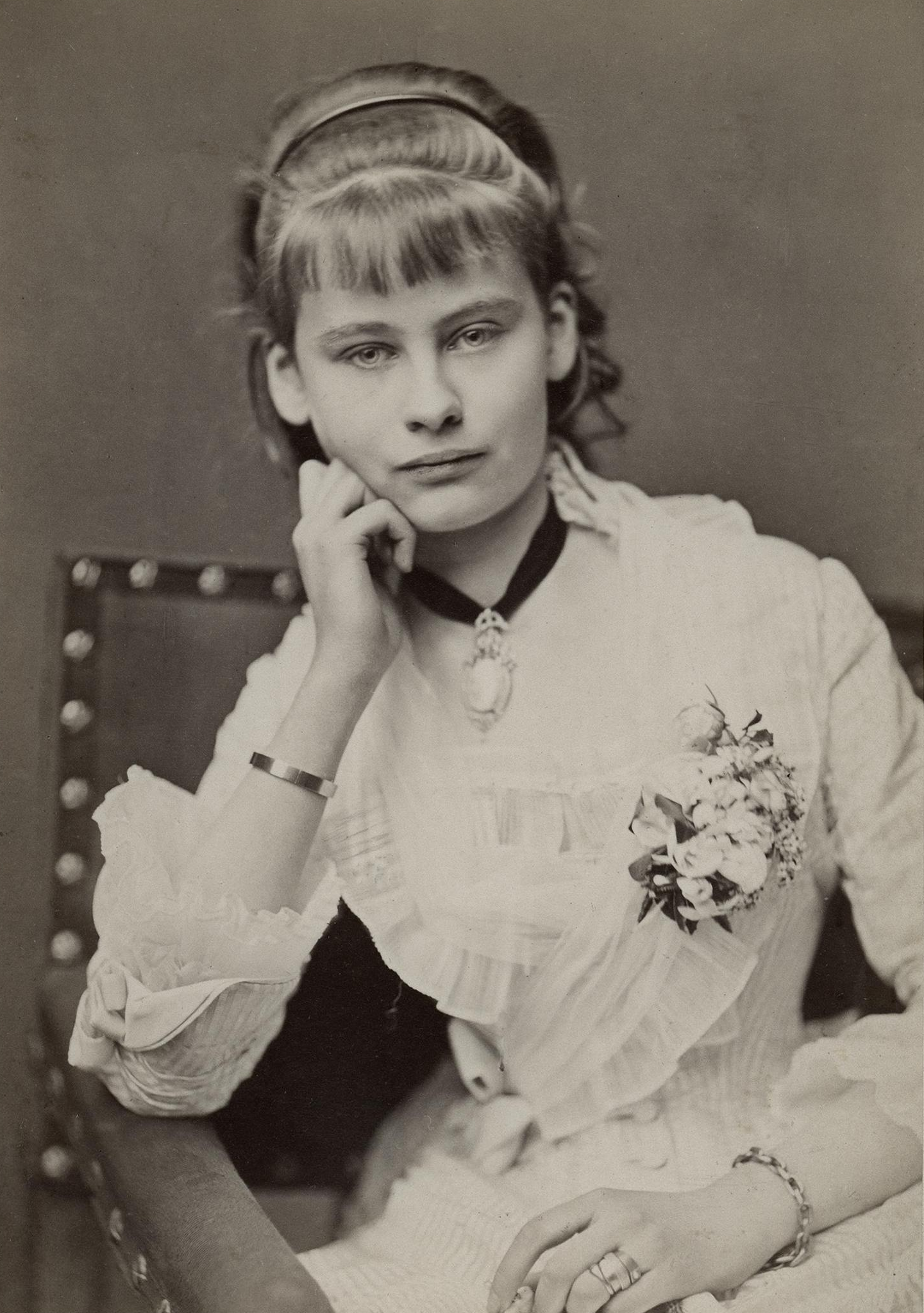
- Born: 28 May 1860; Dresden, Kingdom of Saxony
- Died: 7 February 1881 (aged 20); Ödenburg, Austrian Empire
- Spouse: Miguel Januário, Duke of Braganza (m. 1877)
- Issue: Prince Miguel, Duke of Viseu; Prince Francisco José; Maria Teresa, Princess Karl Ludwig of Thurn and Taxis
Names
- German: Elisabeth Maria Maximiliana
- House: Thurn and Taxis
- Father: Maximilian Anton, Hereditary Prince of Thurn and Taxis
- Mother: Duchess Helene in Bavaria

Princess Elisabeth of Thurn and Taxis (Elisabeth Maria Maximiliana; 28 May 1860 – 7 February 1881) was a German princess who became the Duchess of Braganza through her marriage to Miguel Januário, Duke of Braganza, the Miguelist claimant to the throne of Portugal. As a member of the House of Thurn and Taxis, she was the daughter of Maximilian Anton Lamoral, Hereditary Prince of Thurn and Taxis and Duchess Helene in Bavaria, and the niece of Empress Elisabeth of Austria.

== Life ==
Elisabeth was a Princess of Thurn and Taxis by birth and married Miguel Januário, Duke of Braganza, the Miguelist claimant to the throne of Portugal from 1866 to 1920.

Elisabeth was the daughter of Maximilian Anton, Hereditary Prince of Thurn and Taxis and his wife Duchess Helene in Bavaria.

== Marriage and issue ==
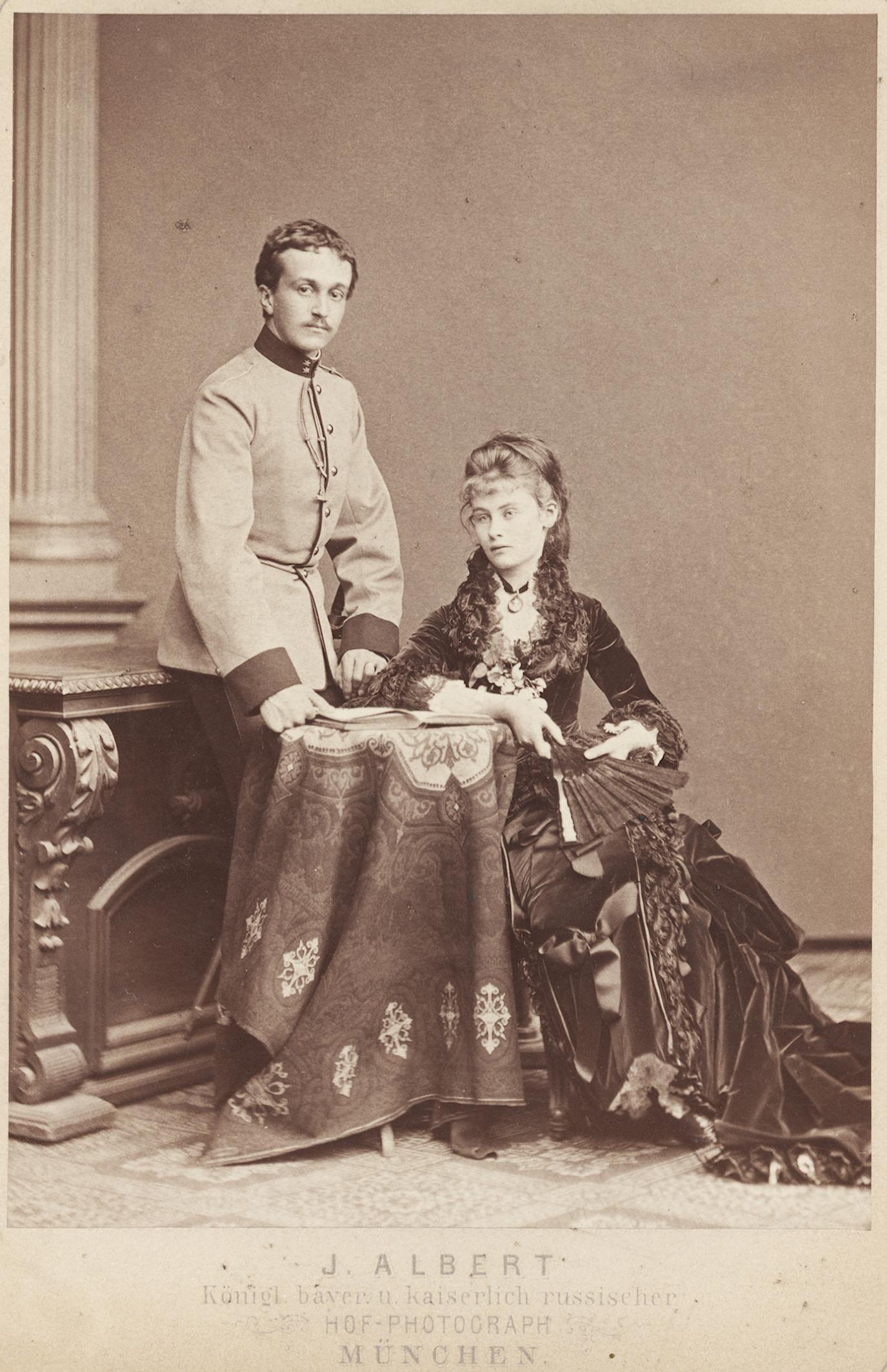
Elisabeth with her husband Miguel Januário, Duke of Braganza, late 1870s

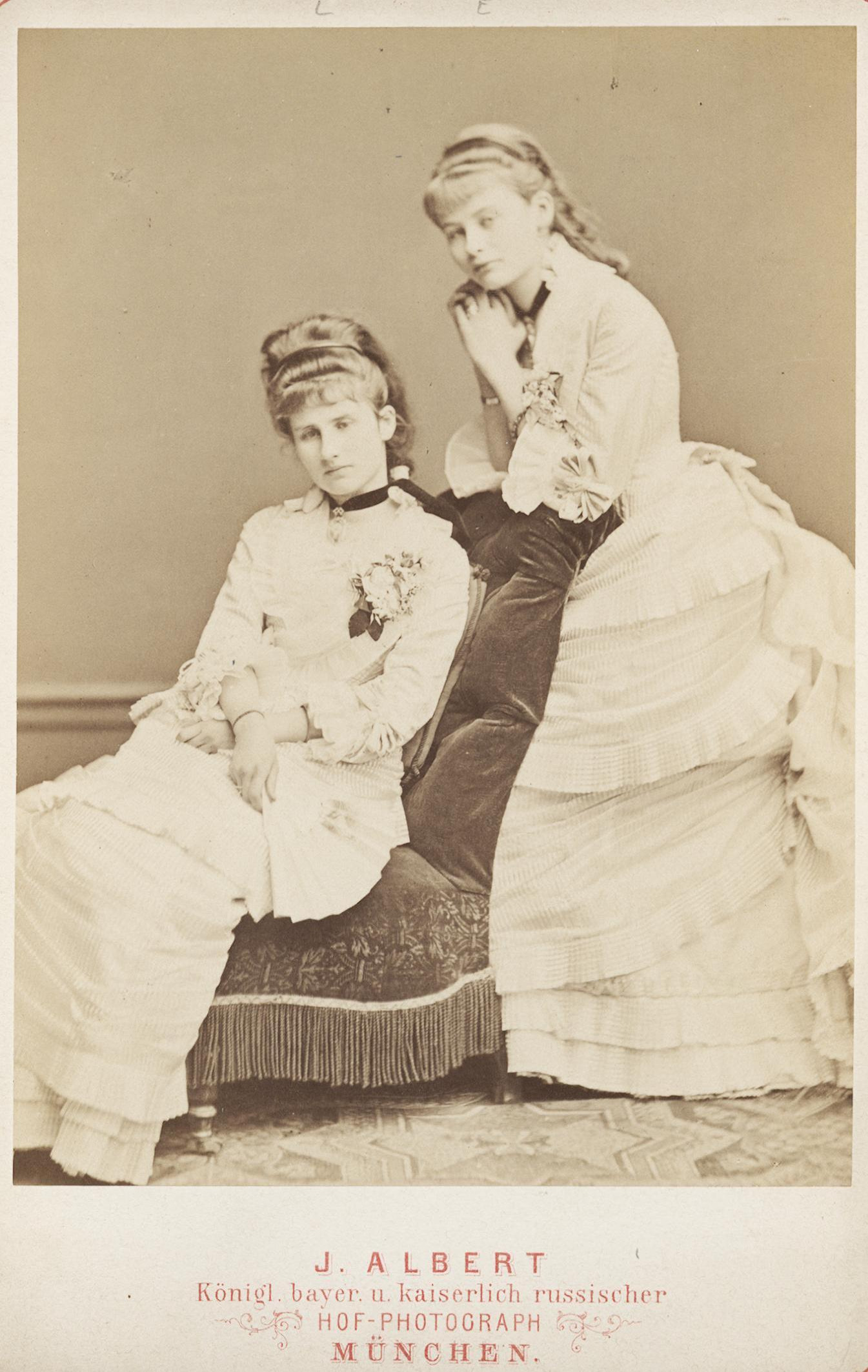
Elisabeth with her elder sister, Louise.

Her marriage to Miguel Januário, Duke of Braganza, son of Miguel I of Portugal and his wife Princess Adelaide of Löwenstein-Wertheim-Rosenberg, on 17 October 1877 in Regensburg, Kingdom of Bavaria.

Elisabeth and Miguel had three children:

- Dom Miguel Maria Maximiliano de Bragança, Duke of Viseu (1878–1923), married Anita Stewart
- Dom Francisco José de Bragança (1879–1919)
- Dona Maria Teresa de Bragança (1881–1945), married Prince Karl Ludwig of Thurn and Taxis

The couple moved to Austria, where on 22 September 1878 in Reichenau an der Rax, her first son, Miguel Maria Maximiliano, was born. It was after this birth that Elisabeth's health began to deteriorate. Elisabeth died at the age of 20 in Ödenburg shortly after the birth of her third child, Maria Teresa.

Elisabeth's mother Helene withdrew more and more from public life after her death. Elisabeth's husband Miguel Januário eventually remarried on 8 November 1893 in Kleinheubach to Princess Maria Theresa of Löwenstein-Wertheim-Rosenberg.

== Ancestry ==
Ancestors of Princess Elisabeth of Thurn and Taxis (1860–1881)

8. Karl Alexander, Prince of Thurn and Taxis
4. Maximilian Karl, Prince of Thurn and Taxis
9. Duchess Therese of Mecklenburg-Strelitz
2. Maximilian Anton, Hereditary Prince of Thurn and Taxis
10. Baron Ernst of Dörnberg
5. Baroness Wilhelmine of Dörnberg
11. Baroness Wilhelmine Sophie of Glauburg
1. Princess Elisabeth of Thurn and Taxis
12. Duke Pius August in Bavaria
6. Duke Maximilian Joseph in Bavaria
13. Princess Amélie Louise of Arenberg
3. Duchess Helene in Bavaria
14. Maximilian I Joseph of Bavaria
7. Princess Ludovika of Bavaria
15. Princess Caroline of Baden

Princess Elisabeth of Thurn and Taxis (1860–1881) House of Thurn and Taxis Cadet branch of the House of Tassis Born: 28 May 1860 Died: 7 February 1881
Titles in pretence
Preceded by Adelaide of Löwenstein	— TITULAR — Queen consort of Portugal; Miguelist line 17 October 1877–7 February 1881	Succeeded by Maria Theresa of Löwenstein
