= Infante Miguel of Portugal =

Miguel of Portugal is the name of a few members of the Portuguese Royal Family:

- Miguel da Paz, Prince of Portugal (1498–1500)
- Miguel I of Portugal (1802–1866)
- Prince Miguel, Duke of Braganza (1853–1927)
- Prince Miguel, Duke of Viseu (1878–1923)
