= Prince Frederick of Hohenzollern-Sigmaringen =

Prussian prince and military general (1843–1904)

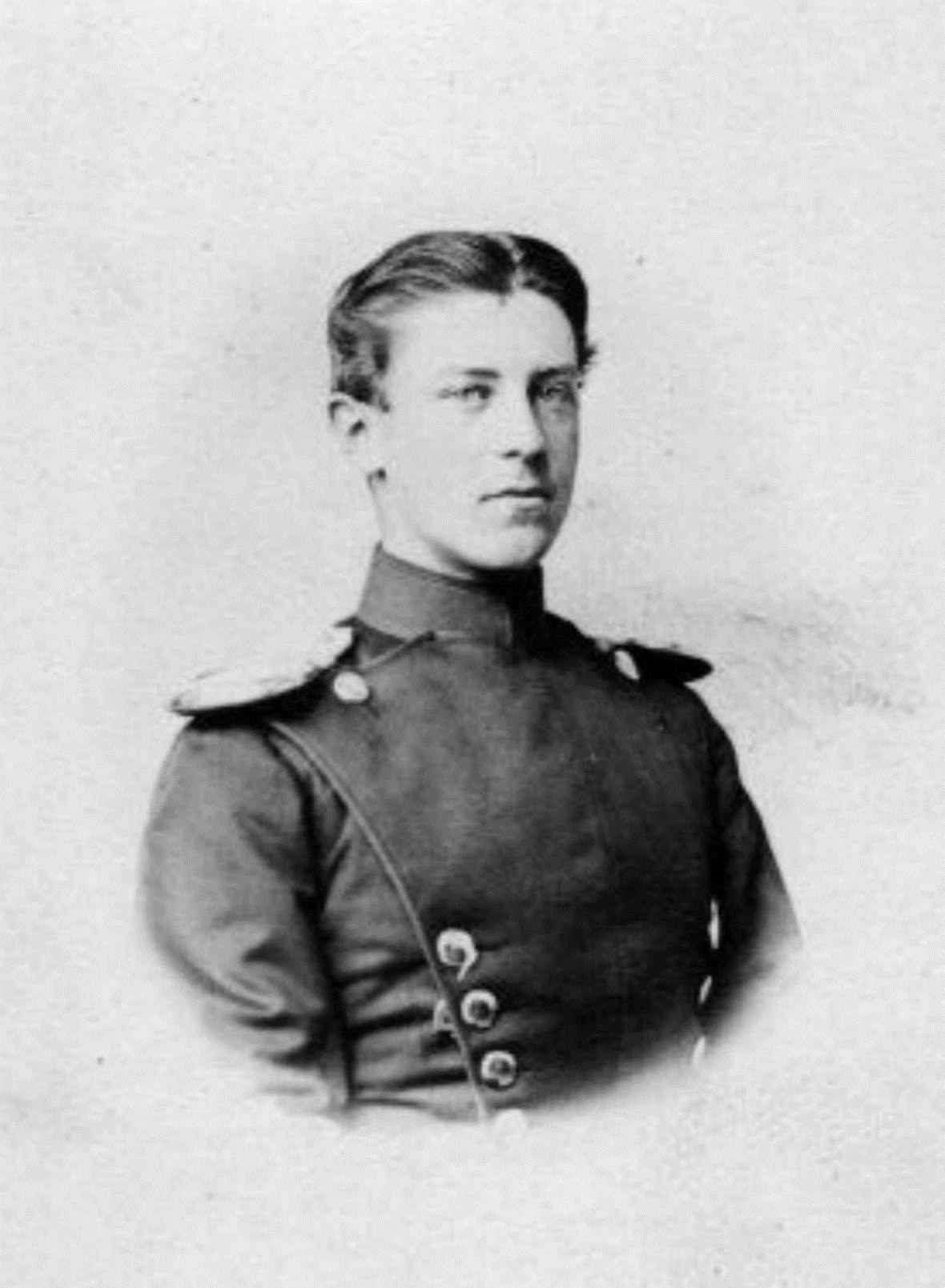
- Prince Frederick in the mid-1860s
- Born: 25 June 1843; Schloss Inzigkofen, Inzigkofen, Hohenzollern-Sigmaringen
- Died: 2 December 1904 (aged 61); Munich, Kingdom of Bavaria
- Burial: Kloster Hedingen, Sigmaringen
- Spouse: Princess Louise of Thurn and Taxis (m. 1879)
Names
- German: Friedrich Eugen Johann
- House: Hohenzollern-Sigmaringen
- Father: Charles Anthony, Prince of Hohenzollern
- Mother: Princess Josephine of Baden

Prince Frederick of Hohenzollern-Sigmaringen (German: Friedrich Eugen Johann, Prinz von Hohenzollern-Sigmaringen) (25 June 1843, in Schloss Inzigkofen, Inzigkofen, Hohenzollern-Sigmaringen – 2 December 1904, in Munich, Kingdom of Bavaria) was a member of the House of Hohenzollern-Sigmaringen and a Prussian General of the Cavalry. He fought with distinction in the Franco-Prussian War. Frederick was the fifth child and youngest son of Charles Anthony, Prince of Hohenzollern, and Princess Josephine of Baden.

== Marriage ==
Frederick married Princess Louise of Thurn and Taxis, eldest child of Maximilian Anton Lamoral, Hereditary Prince of Thurn and Taxis and his wife Duchess Helene in Bavaria, on 21 June 1879 in Regensburg. Frederick and Louise did not have children.

Frederick was buried on 6 December 1904 at the Erlöserkirche in Kloster Hedingen, Sigmaringen.

== Honours and awards ==
He received the following orders and decorations:

- Hohenzollern: Cross of Honour of the Princely House Order of Hohenzollern, 1st Class with Swords
- Kingdom of Prussia:
  - Grand Commander's Cross of the Royal House Order of Hohenzollern, 3 October 1867
  - Grand Cross of the Red Eagle, 14 June 1879
  - Knight of the Black Eagle, with Collar 22.03.1888
  - Iron Cross, 2nd Class
  - Service Award Cross
- Anhalt: Grand Cross of Albert the Bear
- Kingdom of Bavaria: Knight of St. Hubert, 1897
- Baden:
  - Knight of the House Order of Fidelity, 1879
  - Knight of the Order of Berthold the First, 1879
- Belgium: Grand Cordon of the Order of Leopold
- (Saxe-Coburg and Gotha) (Duchy of Saxe-Altenburg) (Saxe-Meiningen) Ernestine duchies: Grand Cross of the Saxe-Ernestine House Order, 1889
- Kingdom of Greece: Grand Cross of the Redeemer
- Kingdom of Italy: Grand Cross of the Crown of Italy
- Mecklenburg: Grand Cross of the Wendish Crown, with Crown in Ore
- Ottoman Empire: Order of Osmanieh, 1st Class
- Kingdom of Romania:
  - Grand Cross of the Star of Romania
  - Grand Cross of the Crown of Romania
- Russian Empire: Knight of St. George, 4th Class
- Saxe-Weimar-Eisenach: Grand Cross of the White Falcon, 1891
- Waldeck and Pyrmont: Order of Merit, 1st Class

== Ancestry ==
Ancestors of Prince Frederick of Hohenzollern-Sigmaringen

8. Anton Aloys, Prince of Hohenzollern-Sigmaringen
4. Karl, Prince of Hohenzollern-Sigmaringen
9. Princess Amalie Zephyrine of Salm-Kyrburg
2. Karl Anton, Prince of Hohenzollern
10. Pierre Murat
5. Marie Antoinette Murat
11. Louise d'Astorg
1. Prince Frederick of Hohenzollern
12. Charles Louis, Hereditary Prince of Baden
6. Charles, Grand Duke of Baden
13. Princess Amalie of Hesse-Darmstadt
3. Princess Josephine of Baden
14. Claude de Beauharnais, comte des Roches-Baritaud
7. Stéphanie de Beauharnais
15. Adrienne de Lézay-Marnézia
