= Prince Miguel, Duke of Viseu =

Prince Miguel
- Duke of Viseu
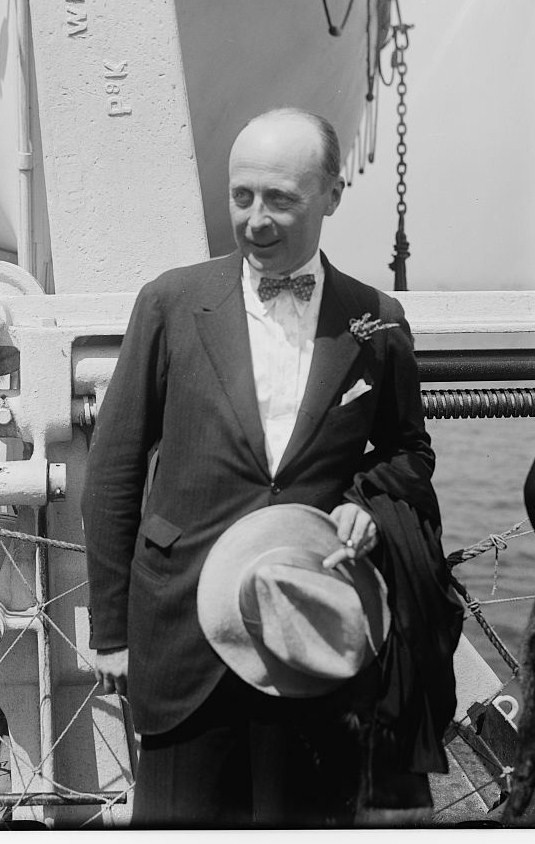
- Born: 22 September 1878; Reichenau an der Rax, Austria below the Enns, Cisleithania, Austria-Hungary
- Died: 21 February 1923 (aged 44); New York City, US
- Spouse: Anita Stewart (m. 1909)
- Issue: Isabel "Nadejda" de Bragança; John de Bragança; Miguel de Bragança
Names
- Miguel Maria Sebastiao Maximiliano Rafael Gabriel Gonzaga Francisco D'Assis e de Paula Eustachio Carlos Afonso José Henrique Alberto Clemente Ignacio Martinho Antonio Gerardo Jorge Emmeric Mauricio de Bragança
- House: Braganza
- Father: Miguel Januário, Duke of Braganza
- Mother: Princess Elisabeth of Thurn and Taxis

Prince Miguel of Braganza, Duke of Viseu (22 September 1878 – 21 February 1923) was a member of the exiled branch of the House of Braganza. The eldest son of the Miguelist pretender to the throne of Portugal, he married an American heiress in 1909, and in 1920, he renounced his rights to the throne. His full given names were Miguel Maria Sebastião Maximiliano Rafael Gabriel Gonzaga Francisco de Assis e de Paula Eustáquio Carlos Afonso José Henrique Alberto Clemente Inácio Martinho António Gerardo Jorge Emerico Maurício.

== Early life ==
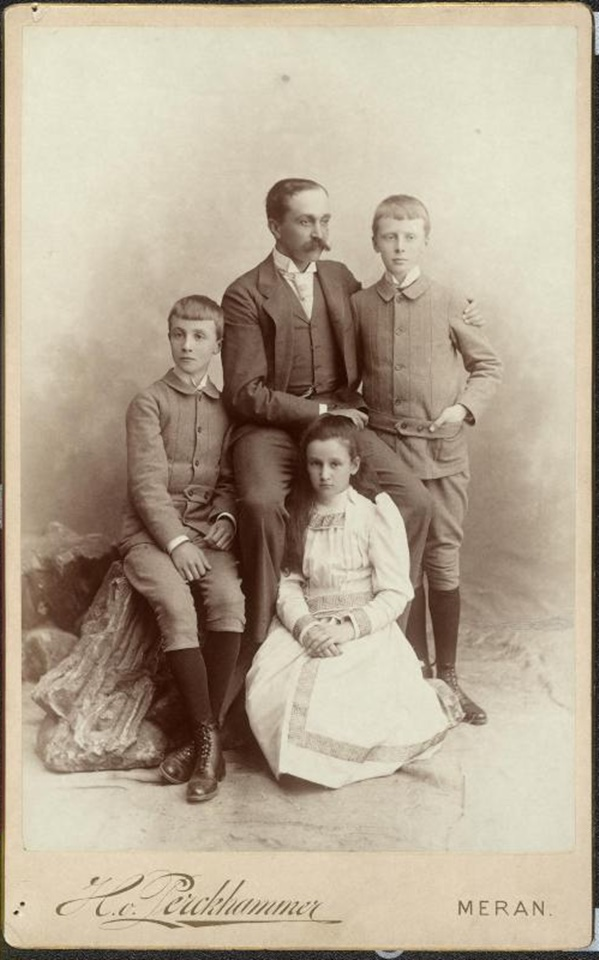
Prince Miguel (far right) with his father, brother Francis Joseph and sister Maria Teresa

Miguel was born in Reichenau an der Rax, Austria-Hungary, the eldest son and heir of the Miguelist pretender to the Portuguese throne Miguel Januário, Duke of Braganza and his first wife Princess Elisabeth of Thurn and Taxis. Prince Miguel's father was the head of the non reigning branch of the Portuguese Royal House that had been exiled from Portugal. The exile was the result of the Portuguese law of banishment of 1834 and the constitution of 1838 which was brought about because in 1828 his grandfather Miguel usurped the throne of Portugal from his niece Queen Maria II. His grandfather reigned as king until 1834 when Maria II was restored.

Like his father, Miguel pursued a career in the Army and served in a Saxon cavalry regiment. On 16 September 1900 Miguel was riding back into town in a Phaeton after having attended a dinner at a country house, when he caught his wheels in the carriage of Prince Albert, the nephew of King Albert of Saxony. The collision was so great that the carriage overturned into a ditch, with the prince dying of his injuries a few hours after. Because it could not be determined whether it was an accident or intentional Miguel escaped a court martial but he was forced to give up his commission in the Army and leave the country.

A year later he caused more controversy when it was discovered that while King Carlos I of Portugal was visiting the United Kingdom, Miguel had entered Portugal with the aim of assisting an uprising against the king. After this was discovered he effectively became a social outcast.

== Marriage ==
On 9 July 1909 Miguel's engagement to the American heiress, Anita Stewart was announced in London. Stewart was the daughter of William Rhinelander Stewart and Annie Armstrong. After her parents divorced in August 1906, her mother married the millionaire James Henry Smith, then the socialite Jean de Saint-Cyr on April 25, 1915.

Miguel and Anita Stewart were married at Tulloch Castle near Dingwall in Scotland on 15 September 1909. This was the first royal wedding in Scotland since the days of the Stuarts. Shortly before the wedding Stewart was created Prinzessin von Braganza (Princess of Braganza) by the Austrian Emperor Francis Joseph. Upon his marriage Miguel was able to keep his place in the line of succession as morganatic marriages did not exist in Portuguese law.

Out of this union, three children were born, all of whom used the title Prince or Princess until 21 July 1920, when their parents' marriage was deemed to be in contravention of royal law, and when Prince Miguel renounced, for them and himself, his rights of succession to the Portuguese throne.

== Later life ==
After his marriage Miguel was granted the title Duke of Viseu by his father, though the reigning Portuguese King Manuel II did not recognise this and claimed the title for himself. Shortly after his marriage, Miguel faced legal action from a syndicate who had lent him money a few years before his marriage when he was in financial difficulties. After promising to pay the syndicate one-fifth of any dowry he received as a result of contracting a marriage he later tried to pay back only what he had originally borrowed. Although he paid off the majority of his creditors after his wedding some were unhappy and seized his furniture and other items and took them to an Auction house.

In 1911-1912 Miguel took part in the monarchist uprisings in Portugal led by Henrique Mitchell de Paiva Couceiro, in an unsuccessful attempt to overthrow the First Portuguese Republic. He was also active in raising money to fund the uprisings.

Miguel later found work in London where he was employed as a Broker's clerk for the city firm Basil Montgomery, Fitzgerald and Company. After originally being forced to resign from the Army, he returned to serve in the German automobile corps during the First World War reaching the rank of Captain.

After the war, Miguel renounced on 21 July 1920 for himself and his descendants, his rights of succession to the Portuguese throne. His father also renounced his rights ten days later which resulted in the Miguelist claim passing to his younger half brother Duarte Nuno.

Prince Miguel later moved to New York City where he sold life insurance before dying of pneumonia following an influenza attack.

== Issue ==
Name	Birth	Death	Notes
Isabel "Nadejda" de Bragança	28 June 1910	13 June 1946	She was married firstly in 1930 to Wlodzimierz Dorozynski with whom she had one son, Alexandre, before divorcing in 1932. Her book Poems for Music was published by Obelisk Press in 1934. She was married for a second time in London on 29 January 1942 to René Millet. She died after a fall which was later ruled to be suicide.
John de Bragança	7 September 1912	12 March 1991	A Harvard graduate, he served in the US Navy during World War II, later becoming vice president and treasurer of the Rhinelander Real Estate Company and an investment banker. He was married firstly in New York City on 21 May 1948 to Winifred Dodge Seyburn (granddaughter of Detroit Auto Pioneer John Dodge) with whom he had one son, Miguel, before divorcing in 1953. He was married secondly on 15 May 1971 to Katharine Bahnson, née King.
Miguel de Bragança	8 February 1915	7 February 1996	A St. George School graduate, he worked as a civil airlines pilot and was married in Miami on 18 November 1946 to Anne Hughson with whom he had two daughters (Anita and Michele).

== Ancestry ==
Ancestors of Prince Miguel, Duke of Viseu

8. John VI of Portugal
4. Miguel I of Portugal
9. Infanta Carlota Joaquina of Spain
2. Miguel Januário, Duke of Braganza
10. Constantine, Prince of Löwenstein-Wertheim-Rosenberg
5. Princess Adelaide of Löwenstein-Wertheim-Rosenberg
11. Princess Agnes of Hohenlohe-Langenburg
1. Prince Miguel, Duke of Viseu
12. Maximilian Karl, Prince of Thurn and Taxis
6. Maximilian Anton, Hereditary Prince of Thurn and Taxis
13. Baroness Wilhelmine of Dörnberg
3. Princess Elisabeth of Thurn and Taxis
14. Duke Maximilian Joseph in Bavaria
7. Duchess Helene in Bavaria
15. Princess Ludovika of Bavaria

Prince Miguel, Duke of Viseu House of Braganza Born: 22 September 1878 Died: 21 February 1923
Portuguese nobility
Vacant Title last held by Infanta Maria	Duke of Viseu; 1909–1920	Vacant Title next held by Infante Miguel
