= Maximilian Maria, 7th Prince of Thurn and Taxis =

Maximilian Maria
- Prince of Thurn and Taxis
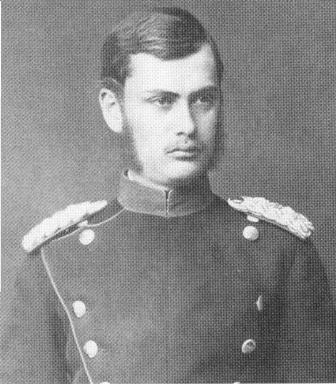

Head of the House of Thurn and Taxis
- Period: 10 November 1871 – 2 June 1885
- Predecessor: Maximilian Karl
- Successor: Albert I
- Born: 24 June 1862; Schloss Taxis, Dischingen, Kingdom of Württemberg
- Died: 2 June 1885 (aged 22); Regensburg, Kingdom of Bavaria, German Empire
- Burial: Gruftkapelle, Saint Emmeram's Abbey, Regensburg
Names
- German: Maximilian Maria Carl Joseph Gabriel Lamoral
- House: Thurn and Taxis
- Father: Maximilian Anton Lamoral, Hereditary Prince of Thurn and Taxis
- Mother: Duchess Helene in Bavaria
- Religion: Roman Catholic

Maximilian Maria Carl Joseph Gabriel Lamoral, 7th Prince of Thurn and Taxis, full German name: Maximilian Maria Carl Joseph Gabriel Lamoral Fürst von Thurn und Taxis (24 June 1862, Schloss Taxis, Dischingen, Kingdom of Württemberg – 2 June 1885, Regensburg, Bavaria, Germany) was the seventh Prince of Thurn and Taxis and Head of the Princely House of Thurn and Taxis from 10 November 1871 until his death on 2 June 1885.

== Early life ==
Maximilian Maria was the elder of the two sons of Maximilian Anton Lamoral, Hereditary Prince of Thurn and Taxis and Duchess Helene in Bavaria. After the death of his father on 26 June 1867, he became heir apparent to the headship of the House of Thurn and Taxis. With the death of his grandfather Maximilian Karl, 6th Prince of Thurn and Taxis on 10 November 1871, he succeeded as Prince of Thurn and Taxis at the age of nine.

== Education ==
To prepare for his future office, Maximilian Maria received his education from Baron Carl von Geyr-Schweppenburg. Maximilian Maria attended no public school, but was given private lessons. Beginning in the Autumn of 1880, he studied philosophy, law, and economics at the Universities of Bonn, Strasbourg, and Göttingen. Since his youth, he was fascinated not only with riding and hunting, but also with the promotion of arts and sciences. He urged his archivist to establish and write a scientifically based history of the House of Thurn and Taxis.

== Career and philanthropy ==
To celebrate his achievements and the official takeover of the government business of the House of Thurn and Taxis, Maximilian Maria created generous foundations for the poor of the city of Regensburg and the surrounding countryside, and also for the restoration of the St. Emmeram's Abbey.

== Death ==
He died young at age 22. His heart had been weakened by scarlet fever in childhood, and he had severe heart spasms. In 1885, he died of a pulmonary embolism.

== Ancestry ==
Ancestors of Maximilian Maria, 7th Prince of Thurn and Taxis

8. Karl Alexander, 5th Prince of Thurn and Taxis
4. Maximilian Karl, 6th Prince of Thurn and Taxis
9. Duchess Therese of Mecklenburg-Strelitz
2. Maximilian Anton Lamoral, Hereditary Prince of Thurn and Taxis
10. Ernst, Baron of Dörnberg
5. Baroness Wilhelmine of Dörnberg
11. Baroness Wilhelmine Henriette Maximiliane of Glauburg
1. Maximilian Maria, 7th Prince of Thurn and Taxis
12. Duke Pius August in Bavaria
6. Duke Maximilian Joseph in Bavaria
13. Princess Amélie Louise of Arenberg
3. Duchess Helene in Bavaria
14. Maximilian I Joseph of Bavaria
7. Princess Ludovika of Bavaria
15. Caroline of Baden

== Bibliography ==
- Wolfgang Behringer: Thurn und Taxis, Die Geschichte ihrer Post und ihrer Unternehmen. München, Zürich 1990, ISBN 3-492-03336-9.
- Martin Dallmeier, Martha Schad: Das Fürstliche Haus Thurn und Taxis, 300 Jahre Geschichte in Bildern. Verlag Friedrich Pustet, Regensburg 1996, ISBN 3-7917-1492-9.

Maximilian Maria, 7th Prince of Thurn and Taxis House of Thurn and Taxis Cadet branch of the House of Tassis Born: 24 June 1862 Died: 2 June 1885
German nobility
Preceded by Maximilian Karl	Prince of Thurn and Taxis; 10 November 1871 – 2 June 1885	Succeeded by Albert I
