= Princess Louise of Thurn and Taxis =

German princess (1859–1948)

- Princess Frederick of Hohenzollern-Sigmaringen
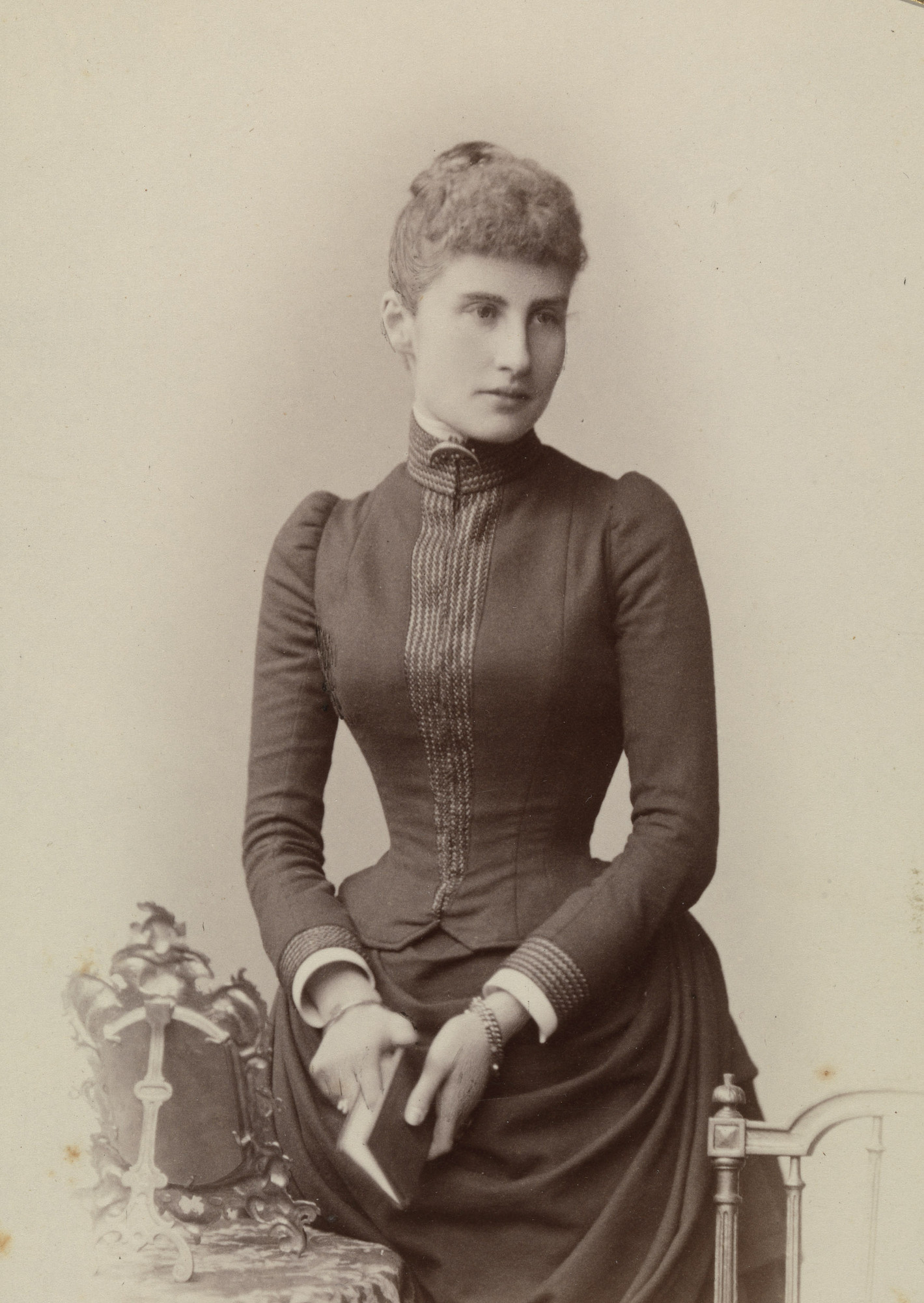
- Born: 1 June 1859; Schloss Taxis, Dischingen, Kingdom of Württemberg
- Died: 20 June 1948 (aged 89); Sigmaringen, Allied-occupied Germany
- Burial: Kloster Hedingen, Sigmaringen
- Spouse: Prince Frederick of Hohenzollern-Sigmaringen (m. 1879; died 1904)
Names
- German: Luisa Mathilde Wilhelmine Marie Maximiliane
- House: Thurn and Taxis
- Father: Maximilian Anton, Hereditary Prince of Thurn and Taxis
- Mother: Duchess Helene in Bavaria

Princess Louise of Thurn and Taxis (German: Luisa Mathilde Wilhelmine Marie Maximiliane, Prinzessin von Thurn und Taxis; 1 June 1859 – 20 June 1948) was the eldest child of Maximilian Anton, Hereditary Prince of Thurn and Taxis, and Duchess Helene in Bavaria. She married Prince Frederick of Hohenzollern-Sigmaringen in 1879.

== Life ==
Louise was a member of the House of Thurn and Taxis by birth and through her marriage to Prince Frederick of Hohenzollern-Sigmaringen, a Princess of Hohenzollern-Sigmaringen.

Louise was the eldest child of Maximilian Anton, Hereditary Prince of Thurn and Taxis and his wife Duchess Helene in Bavaria.

== Marriage ==
Louise married Prince Frederick of Hohenzollern-Sigmaringen, fifth child and youngest son of Karl Anton, Prince of Hohenzollern and his wife Princess Josephine of Baden, on 21 June 1879 in Regensburg.

Louise and Frederick did not have children.

Marie of Romania, who married her nephew-by-marriage, wrote in her memoirs:

"Tantchen," his thin, active, talkative little wife, was more militant and showed scant patience with either Uncle or Aunty. Both her elderly sisters-in-law exasperated her, Fürstin Antonia as well as Carmen Sylva; I am afraid that she even occasionally called them "humbugs" and was not disinclined to be in sympathy with the younger generation when they allowed themselves to criticize their betters. "Tantchen" was very self-opinionated but not a pedagogue; she laughed with the young.

== Ancestry ==
Ancestors of Princess Louise of Thurn and Taxis

8. Karl Alexander, Prince of Thurn and Taxis
4. Maximilian Karl, Prince of Thurn and Taxis
9. Duchess Therese of Mecklenburg-Strelitz
2. Maximilian Anton, Hereditary Prince of Thurn and Taxis
10. Baron Ernst of Dörnberg
5. Baroness Wilhelmine of Dörnberg
11. Wilhelmine Henriette Maximiliane von Glauburg
1. Princess Louise of Thurn and Taxis
12. Duke Pius August in Bavaria
6. Duke Maximilian Joseph in Bavaria
13. Princess Amélie Louise of Arenberg
3. Duchess Helene in Bavaria
14. Maximilian I Joseph of Bavaria
7. Princess Ludovika of Bavaria
15. Princess Caroline of Baden
