= Maximilian Anton, Hereditary Prince of Thurn and Taxis =

Maximilian Anton
- Hereditary Prince of Thurn and Taxis
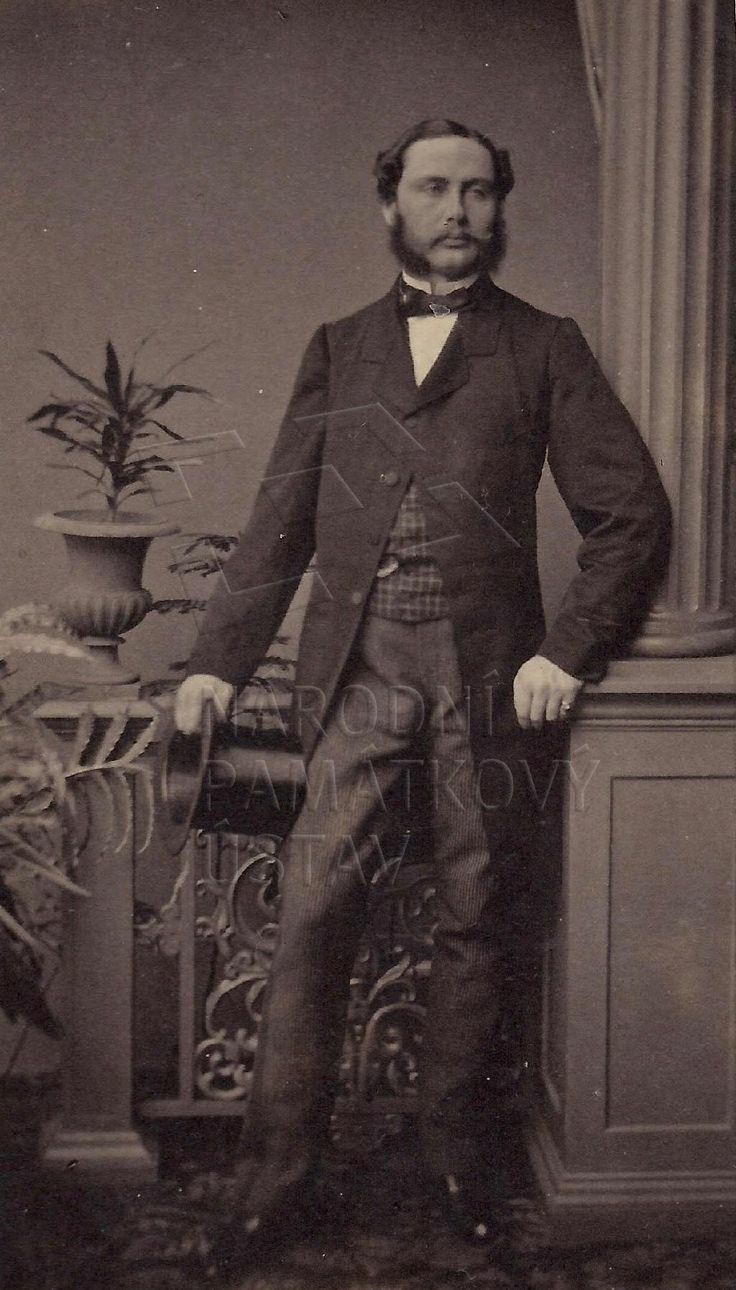
- Maximilian Anton c. 1860
- Born: 28 September 1831; Regensburg, Kingdom of Bavaria
- Died: 26 June 1867 (aged 35); Regensburg, Kingdom of Bavaria
- Burial: Gruftkapelle, Saint Emmeram's Abbey, Regensburg
- Spouse: Duchess Helene in Bavaria (m. 1858)
- Issue: Louise, Princess of Hohenzollern; Elisabeth, Duchess of Braganza; Maximilian Maria, 7th Prince of Thurn and Taxis; Albert, 8th Prince of Thurn and Taxis
Names
- German: Maximilian Anton Lamoral
- House: Thurn and Taxis
- Father: Maximilian Karl, 6th Prince of Thurn and Taxis
- Mother: Baroness Wilhelmine of Dörnberg

Maximilian Anton Lamoral, Hereditary Prince of Thurn and Taxis (German: Maximilian Anton Lamoral Erbprinz von Thurn und Taxis; 28 September 1831 – 26 June 1867) was the Hereditary Prince of Thurn and Taxis from birth until his death in 1867.

== Biography ==
Maximilian Anton Lamoral was the son of Maximilian Karl, 6th Prince of Thurn and Taxis, and his wife, Baroness Wilhelmine of Dörnberg.

=== Marriage and residence ===
Maximilian married Duchess Helene in Bavaria, daughter of Duke Maximilian Joseph in Bavaria and Princess Ludovika of Bavaria, on 24 August 1858 at Possenhofen Castle. Helene was the eldest sister of Empress Elisabeth of Austria.

Initially, King Maximilian II of Bavaria had refused to let Helene, his first cousin, marry a prince who was not from a reigning royal house. However, Helene's brother-in-law, Emperor Franz Joseph I of Austria, intervened, and the marriage took place as planned.

The couple resided in the Erbprinzenpalais (Hereditary Prince's Palace) in Regensburg, a Baroque four-wing complex on the northern east side of Bismarckplatz. The building, originally constructed in 1701 as a guesthouse for Prüfening Abbey, was re-acquired by the House of Thurn and Taxis in 1862 to serve as the couple's residence.

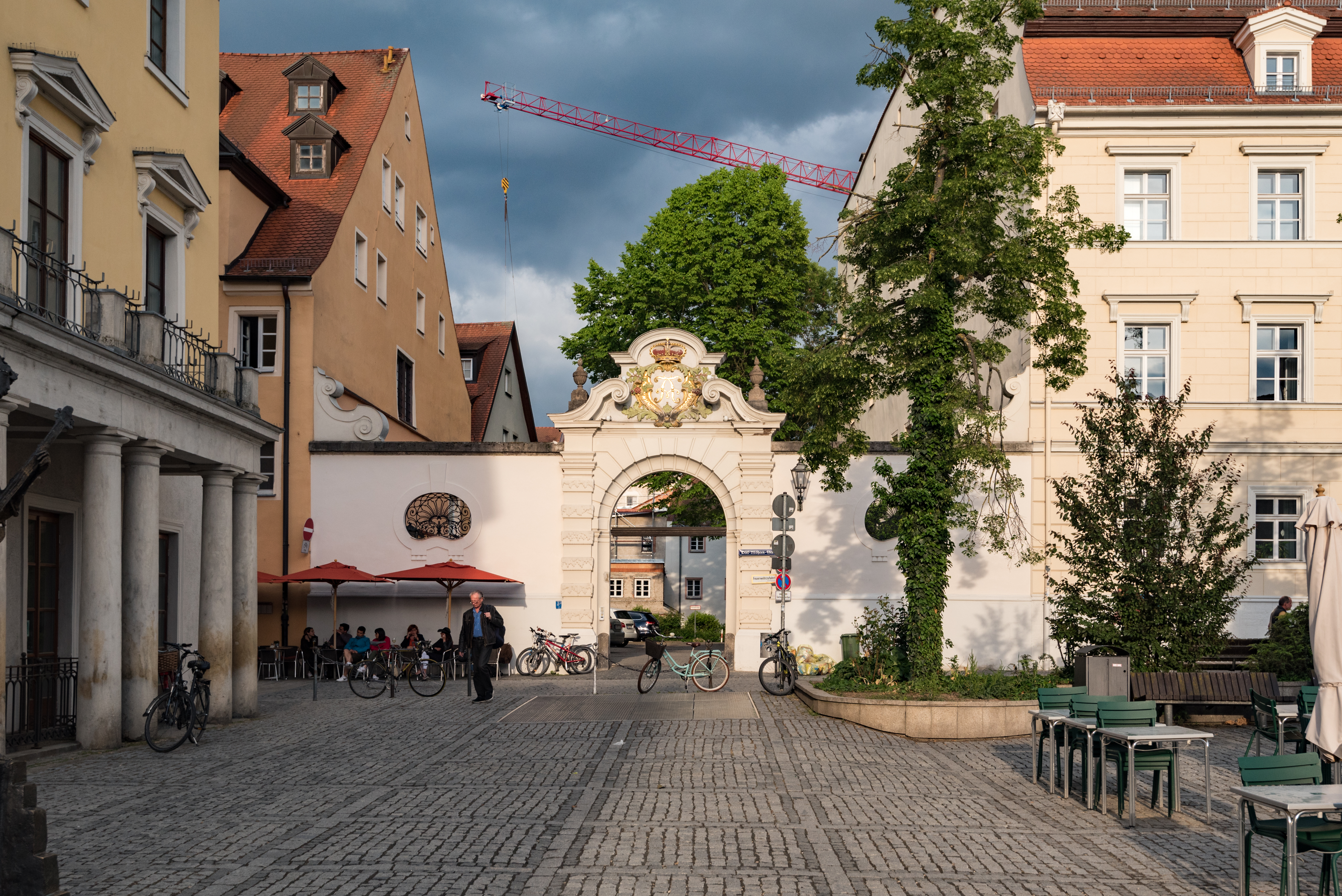
Bismarckplatz: entrance to the former Erbprinzenpalais (left) and theater facade

=== Children ===
Maximilian and Helene had four children:

- Princess Louise of Thurn and Taxis, married Prince Frederick of Hohenzollern-Sigmaringen (1 June 1859 – 20 June 1948)
- Princess Elisabeth of Thurn and Taxis, married Miguel, Duke of Braganza (28 May 1860 – 7 February 1881)
- Maximilian Maria, 7th Prince of Thurn and Taxis (24 June 1862 – 2 June 1885)
- Albert, 8th Prince of Thurn and Taxis, married Archduchess Margarethe Klementine of Austria (8 May 1867 – 22 January 1952)

=== Death and legacy ===
Maximilian died on 26 June 1867 at the age of 35 in Regensburg, with the cause of death cited as either kidney failure or pulmonary paralysis. He was interred in the burial chapel at St. Emmeram's Abbey.

Because he predeceased his father, the succession passed directly to his nine-year-old son, Maximilian Maria, in 1871. His widow, Helene, served as guardian for her son until 1883.

King Ludwig II wrote in a personal letter of condolence to Maximilian's father:

I feel with your Highness the deep and justified pain felt by you and the entire Taxis family, and I well appreciate what a wealth of hopes has been extinguished with the dear life of the departed.

== Ancestry ==
Ancestors of Maximilian Anton, Hereditary Prince of Thurn and Taxis

8. Karl Anselm, 4th Prince of Thurn and Taxis
4. Karl Alexander, 5th Prince of Thurn and Taxis
9. Duchess Auguste of Württemberg
2. Maximilian Karl, 6th Prince of Thurn and Taxis
10. Charles II, Grand Duke of Mecklenburg
5. Duchess Therese of Mecklenburg-Strelitz
11. Princess Friederike of Hesse-Darmstadt
1. Maximilian Anton Lamoral, Hereditary Prince of Thurn and Taxis
12. Pandolphus Ferdinand, Baron of Dörnberg
6. Ernst, Baron of Dörnberg
13. Caroline Dorothea von Löwenstein
3. Baroness Wilhelmine of Dörnberg
14. Friedrich Maximilian, Baron von Glauburg
7. Baroness Wilhelmine Henriette Maximiliane von Glauburg
15. Wilhelmine Auguste Caroline von Geismar
