= Duchess Helene in Bavaria =

Hereditary Princess of Thurn and Taxis (1834–1890)

Helene Caroline Therese
- Hereditary Princess of Thurn and Taxis
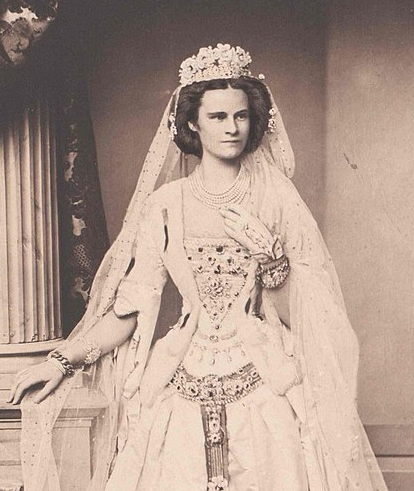
- Helene in 1858
- Born: 4 April 1834; Munich, Kingdom of Bavaria
- Died: 16 May 1890 (aged 56); Regensburg, Kingdom of Bavaria
- Burial: Gruftkapelle, Saint Emmeram's Abbey, Regensburg
- Spouse: Maximilian Anton, Hereditary Prince of Thurn and Taxis (m. 1858; died 1867)
- Issue Detail: Louise, Princess of Hohenzollern; Elisabeth, Duchess of Braganza; Maximilian Maria, 7th Prince of Thurn and Taxis; Albert, 8th Prince of Thurn and Taxis
Names
- German: Helene Caroline Therese
- House: Wittelsbach
- Father: Duke Maximilian Joseph in Bavaria
- Mother: Princess Ludovika of Bavaria

Duchess Helene in Bavaria (Helene Caroline Therese; 4 April 1834 – 16 May 1890), nicknamed Néné, was the Hereditary Princess of Thurn and Taxis as the wife of Maximilian Anton Lamoral. She was a Duchess in Bavaria by birth as the daughter of Duke Maximilian Joseph and Princess Ludovika. She was temporarily the head of the Thurn and Taxis family.

In 1858, Helene married Maximilian Anton, Hereditary Prince of Thurn and Taxis. After nearly nine years of marriage, Maximillian died due to a chronic kidney disease, leaving the Thurn and Taxis throne in the hands of Helene until their son reached maturity.

== Early life (1834–1858) ==
=== Childhood ===
Helene Caroline Therese was the third (Note: Helene was the second child to survive to adulthood. Her older brother, Wilhelm Karl, died in infancy, henceforth, Helene’s younger sister, Elisabeth, is deemed as the third.) child and eldest daughter of Duke Maximilian Joseph in Bavaria and Princess Ludovika of Bavaria. Princess Ludovika had been pregnant with twins, but lost one of the fetuses during a trip to Bayreuth. Helene was born on 4 April 1834 in the Herzog Max Palais in Munich and was christened Caroline Therese Helene.

As a child, Helene and her siblings enjoyed a more carefree and informal upbringing than what was customary for royal children at the time. Their family home during winter was Herzog-Max-Palais in Munich and Possenhofen Castle on Lake Starnberg during summer.

Helene was not considered a pretty child. One of her aunts, Elisabeth Ludovika of Bavaria, described the then seven-year-old as "cross-eyed and unhappily ugly" after a visit to Possenhofen Castle. Another aunt, Princess Sophie of Bavaria, remarked after a meeting in Innsbruck in June 1848 that "poor Helene [...] was not pretty".

Helene was known in her family for her difficult character. Her niece Duchess Amalie in Bavaria recorded in her memoirs that Helene had "made life sour" in her girlhood.

=== Marriage prospects ===
In 1853 Helene traveled with her mother, Ludovika, and her younger sister Elisabeth to Bad Ischl, Upper Austria for the birthday of her cousin, Franz Joseph I, then the Emperor of Austria. During this visit, Franz Joseph asked for Elisabeth's hand in marriage. Historical accounts often contain the assertion that according to a plan by the two mothers, Franz Joseph was to be engaged to Helene instead. However, recent source investigations have shown that there is no written evidence to support this claim. Neither in the correspondence of Archduchess Sophie nor in the surviving correspondence of Duchess Ludovika are there indications of a planned engagement in Bad Ischl.

By 22 years old, Helene was not yet married, and Ludovika became concerned that her incredibly pious daughter would take the veil and join a convent. Therefore, Ludovika arranged for her to meet the wealthy Maximilian Anton, Hereditary Prince of Thurn and Taxis. Duke Maximillian Joseph, Helene's father, invited the Thurn and Taxis family to Possenhofen for a hunting party, at which Prince Maximilian was introduced to Helene.

While the prince was vacationing at Possenhofen, he brought his marriage plans to his parents, who immediately agreed. The only difficulty involved was that, although the Thurn and Taxis family were counted among the richest in the land, they were not considered social equals for a princess of royal blood and a member of the House of Wittelsbach. Because of this, King Maximilian II of Bavaria, who was a cousin of Helene, did not at first agree to a marriage between the two, but through Elisabeth's influence on the king, the marriage took place nevertheless.

== Marriage and later life (1858–1890) ==
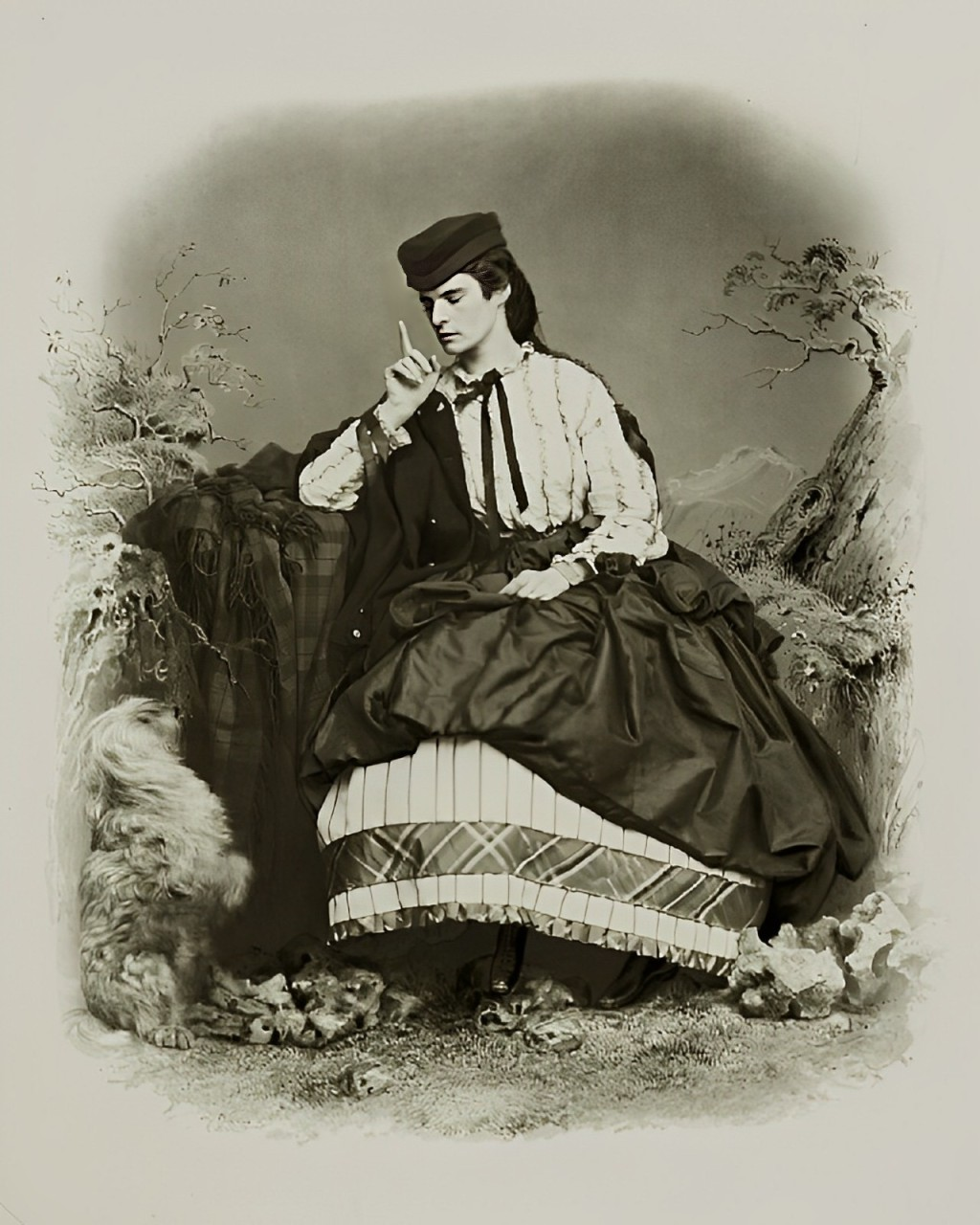
Photograph of Helene, 1860s

The wedding ceremony was held on 24 August 1858 at Possenhofen Castle. To mark the occasion, the in-laws gave the bride a necklace worth 160,000 Gulden. In spite of the earlier objections to the match, Helene is considered to have had the only happy marriage among the five Wittelsbach sisters.

The first child, a daughter, who they named Louisa, was born in 1859, followed by a second daughter, Elisabeth, in 1860. Shortly after the birth of her second child she traveled to Corfu to visit her sister Elisabeth, who was very ill. She returned by way of Vienna, where she reported to Franz Joseph on the poor state of his wife.

Helene gave birth to the much-desired son in 1862, Maximilian Maria, 7th Prince of Thurn and Taxis, and in 1867 she gave birth to another son, Albert, 8th Prince of Thurn and Taxis.

Even though Helene and Maximilian Anton had a happy marriage, this became overshadowed by his severe chronic kidney disease. Neither a course of treatment in Karlsbad nor the best doctors could save him. He died in 1867 at only 35 years of age.

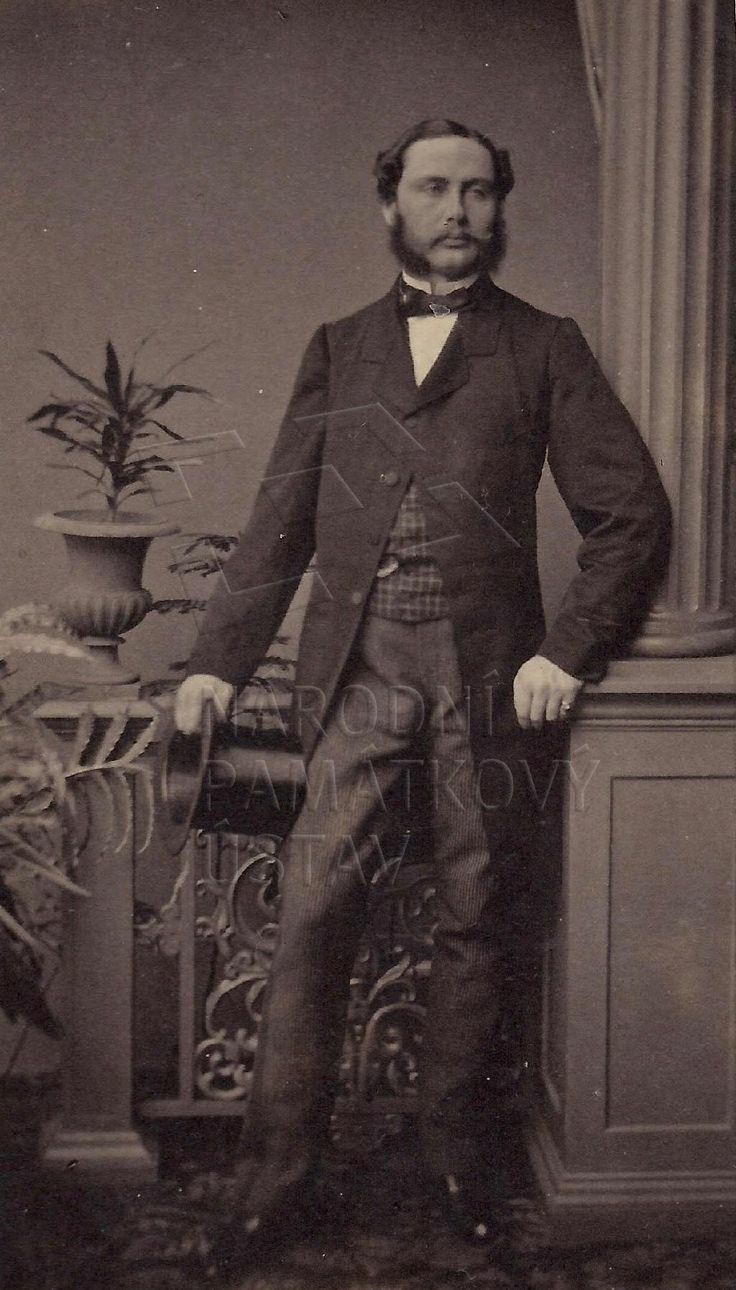
Helene's husband Maximilian

Helene took her mind off her sorrows with charitable activities, and received the guardianship of her children from the Emperor of Austria. Her father-in-law began to include her in the business affairs of the House of Thurn and Taxis, seeing in her a support and successor. In this way she became the head of the family until her oldest son reached his majority.

In 1883, her son Maximilian took over the leadership of the family business, but he soon fell ill. His heart had been weakened by scarlet fever in childhood, and he suffered from severe heart spasms. In 1885, he died of a pulmonary embolism. This left Helene the family head again until 1888 when her son Albert reached his majority and took over the family businesses. Helene then retired and dedicated herself to her religious devotions.

=== Death ===
Helene died of stomach cancer on 16 May 1890, at the age of 56.

== Children ==
Children	Birth	Death	Notes
Louise	1 June 1859	20 June 1948	Married Prince Frederick of Hohenzollern-Sigmaringen in 1879. No issue.
Elisabeth	28 May 1860	1 February 1881	Married Prince Miguel, Duke of Braganza in 1877. Had issue.
Maximillian Maria	24 June 1862	2 June 1885	Became Head of the Princely House of Thurn and Taxis. Never married, nor had issue.
Albert	8 May 1867	22 January 1952	Married Archduchess Margarethe Klementine of Austria in 1890. Had issue.

== Honors ==
Styles of Helene, Hereditary Princess of Thurn and Taxis
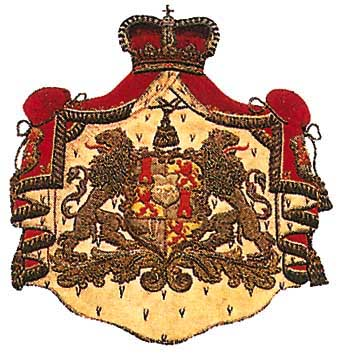
- Reference style: Her Royal Highness
- Spoken style: Your Royal Highness

- Spain: Dame of the Order of Queen Maria Luisa

== Ancestry ==
Ancestors of Duchess Helene in Bavaria

8. Duke Wilhelm in Bavaria
4. Duke Pius August in Bavaria
9. Countess Palatine Maria Anna of Zweibrücken-Birkenfeld
2. Duke Maximilian Joseph in Bavaria
10. Prince Louis of Arenberg
5. Princess Amélie Louise of Arenberg
11. Anne Marie Adélaïde Julie de Mailly-Nesle
1. Duchess Helene in Bavaria
12. Frederick Michael, Count Palatine of Zweibrücken
6. Maximilian I Joseph of Bavaria
13. Countess Palatine Maria Franziska of Sulzbach
3. Princess Ludovika of Bavaria
14. Charles Louis, Hereditary Prince of Baden
7. Princess Caroline of Baden
15. Princess Amalie of Hesse-Darmstadt
