= Czech branch of the Thurn und Taxis family =

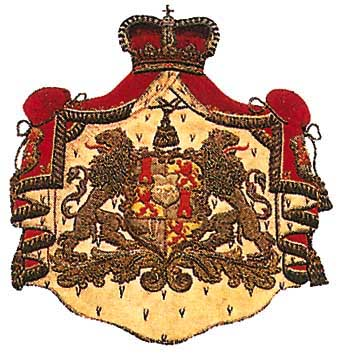
Princely Coat of Arms of Thurn und Taxis

The Czech branch of the House of Thurn and Taxis (German: Thurn und Taxis) is a dynastic cadet branch of the Princely House of Thurn and Taxis, a German noble family that was a key player in the postal services in Europe since the 16th century and became one of the largest land owners in Germany.

Descendants of the House of Thurn und Taxis in Bohemia, a family that played an important role in Czech national culture and local history for 140 years, are today dispersed around the world.

== Foundation ==
The Czech branch of the House of Thurn und Taxis was founded in 1808 by Prince Maximilian Joseph von Thurn und Taxis, the youngest child of Alexander Ferdinand, 3rd Prince of Thurn and Taxis (1704–1773), a founder of a dynastic order of knighthood and a house order of chivalry in the Princely House of Thurn and Taxis, The Order of Parfaite Amitié, and his third wife Princess Maria Henriette von Fürstenberg (1732–1772).

== Maximilian Joseph von Thurn und Taxis ==
Prince Maximilian Joseph von Thurn und Taxis (Regensburg, 29 May 1769 – Prague, 15 May 1831) married Princess Eleonore von Lobkowicz (Prague, 22 April 1770 – Lautschin, 9 November 1834), in 1791. She belonged to a Czech noble family whose origin can be traced back to Mares Martin z Ujezda (1376–90). In 1808, he inherited Lautschin (Loučeň in Czech) and Dobrovice castles from his cousin Princess Maria Josefa von Fürstenberg (1756-1809), and in 1820 permanently settled in Bohemia. Besides Lautschin and other rural estates, the family also owned real estate in Prague that included two palaces: one in the city's uptown (V jámě 635–636, no longer exists) and one in the old town (Vrtbovský Palace in Malá Strana, purchased in 1814).

Maximilian and Eleonore had six sons:

- Karl Anselm von Thurn und Taxis (1792–1844), the firstborn (not to be confused with his uncle Karl Anselm, 4th Prince of Thurn and Taxis of Regensburg, heir to the senior line of the House of Thurn und Taxis)
- August Maria Maximilian von Thurn und Taxis (1794–1862)
- Joseph von Thurn und Taxis (1796–1857)
- Karl Theodor von Thurn und Taxis (1797–1868)
- Friedrich Hannibal Thurn and Taxis (1799–1857)
- Wilhelm Karl von Thurn und Taxis (1801–1848)

== Karl Anselm von Thurn und Taxis ==
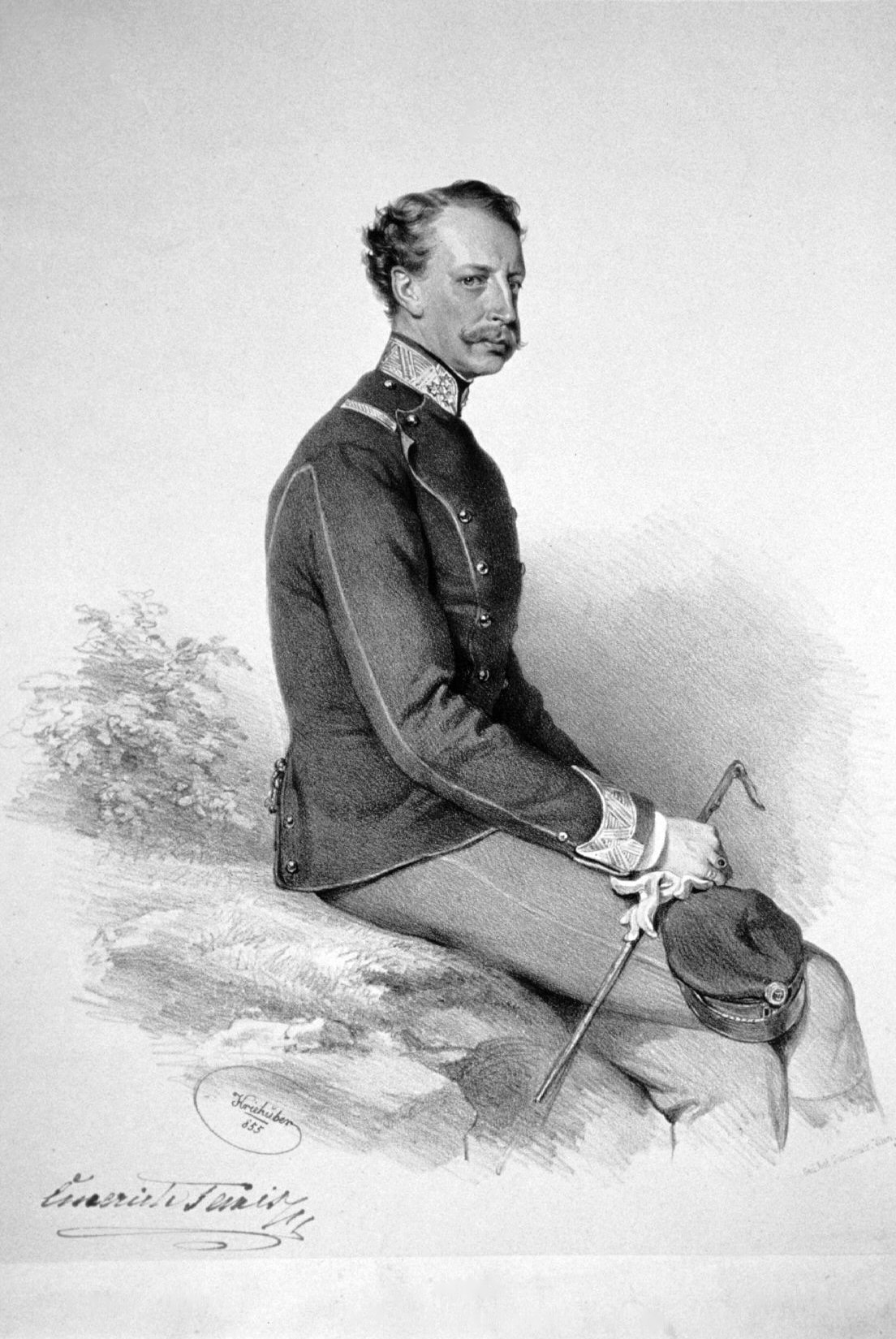
Emmerich von Thurn und Taxis (1820–1900)

In 1815, Prince Karl Anselm von Thurn und Taxis (Prague, 18 June 1792 – Teplitz, 25 August 1844) married Countess Marie Isabelle von und zu Eltz genannt Faust von Stromberg (Dresden, 10 February 1795 – Prague, 12 March 1859). They had six children:

- Marie Sophie (1816-1897) ⚭ Count Giovanni Batista von Montfort (1804-1878)
- Hugo (1817–1889), heir to the family estate
- Eleonore (1818-1898)
- Emmerich (1820–1900), general and Knight in the Order of the Golden Fleece ⚭ Countess Lucie Capello von Wickeburg (1832-1851)
- Marie Theresa (1824-1889) ⚭ Count Edmund von Belcredi (d. 1896)
- Rudolf (1833–1904), who became Baron von Troskow.

Prince Rudolf von Thurn und Taxis, later known as Rudolf, Baron von Troskow (Prague, 25 November 1833 – Velehrad, 4 July 1904), was married in 1857 to Jenny Ständler (Prague, 9 April 1830 – Graz, 28 September 1914). They had several children.

Rudolf was an intellectual who loved Czech music and literature and was an avid patron of the arts. He studied law and in 1861 founded Právník ("The Lawyer"), the first Czech language law journal. Aided by writer and historian Karel Jaromír Erben, he also contributed vocabulary to Czech legal terminology.

He was sincerely devoted to the Czech national cause and was one of its important players: among others, he was the publisher of Boleslavan ("Boleslav's Magazine"), a Czech language weekly dedicated to the cause, and became the first chairman of the famous Czech choir Hlahol.

He was also a member of the Committee for the Establishment of the Czech National Theatre (1861) and one of the founders of Czech arts society Umělecká beseda in Prague (1863). He supported Czech writers Božena Němcová, Vítězslav Hálek, and Karolina Světlá, and promoted Czech composers Antonín Dvořák and Bedřich Smetana. The latter composed the opera Braniboři v Čechách ("The Brandenburgers in Bohemia") at Rudolf's estate in Niměřice.

In 1894, Rudolf gave up his princely title and family name, receiving at his request the title of Freiherr von Troskow from the Emperor Franz Joseph. Ten years later he died while visiting his daughter Hedvika in Velehrad, Moravia. In 1930, his and his wife's remains were exhumed and reinterred in the family grave in Stará Boleslav.

== Hugo Maximilian von Thurn und Taxis ==
Prince Hugo Maximilian von Thurn und Taxis (Prague, 3 July 1817 – Lautschin, 28 November 1889) married Countess Almeria von Belcredi (Ingrowitz, 8 October 1819 – Lautschin, 25 September 1914), sister of Count Richard von Belcredi, who served as Minister-President of the Austrian Empire. Hugo's estate included castles in Dobrovice, Lautschin (Loucen in Czech) and Mzells (Mcely), and estates in Vlkava, Niměřice and Ceteň. They had four legitimate children:

- Karoline (1846-1931)
- Egmont (1849-1866)
- Alexander (his heir) (1851-1939)
- Maria Theresia (1856-1908)

== Alexander von Thurn und Taxis ==
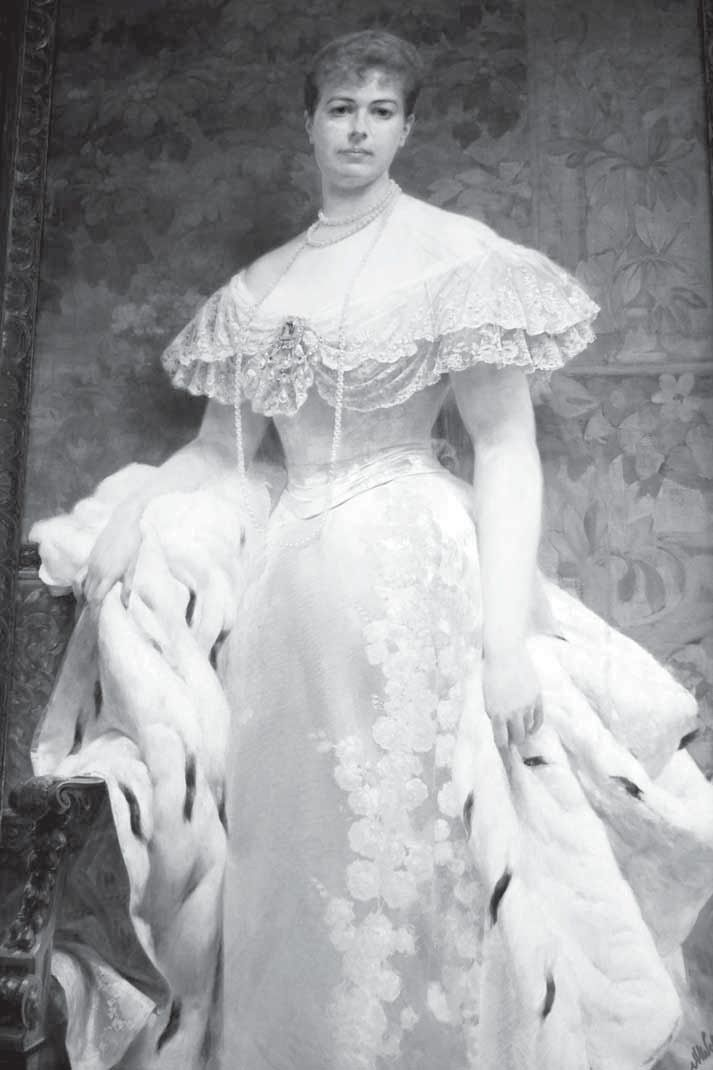
Prince Alexander's wife: Princess Marie von Hohenlohe-Waldenburg-Schillingsfürst

Prince Alexander Johann Vincenz Rudolf Hugo Karl Lamoral Eligius von Thurn und Taxis (Lautschin (Loučeň), 1 December 1851 – Lautschin, 21 July 1939) married in 1875 Princess Marie zu Hohenlohe-Waldenburg-Schillingsfürst (Venice, 28 December 1855 – Lautschin, 16 February 1934). They inherited Schloss Lautschin in 1889.

=== Cultural influence ===
Both Alexander and Marie were avid patrons of the arts (Alexander himself played violin and Marie was an amateur painter), and although they were not wealthy compared to their Regensburg relatives, they were generous and never hesitated to support a good cause.

Marie's protégé Rainer Maria Rilke used to visit the family at their castles Lautschin and Duino. He dedicated his Duino Elegies to the princess, who in turn wrote about him in her published memoirs.

Besides Rilke, regular guests at the castle in Lautschin included Karel Sladkovský and Bedřich Smetana who in 1880 dedicated his composition Z domoviny for violin and piano to Alexander.

After Smetana's death, Alexander designated the house in nearby Jabkenice, where Smetana lived his last years, as Smetana's museum and donated land for his memorial.

Other artists and intellectuals known to visit the castle included F. X. Salda, Eliška Krásnohorská, Karel Bendl, members of the Czech Quartet (who included composer Josef Suk), and Mark Twain (who visited the castle during his European travels in 1899).

Alexander also loved to travel and he was a passionate hunter who made several hunting trips to Africa, occasionally accompanied by Czech traveller Bedřich Machulka; he later donated his animal trophies to the National Museum in Prague. He belonged to the Knights of Malta and financially assisted a number of charitable causes. Together with his father Prince Hugo he was also instrumental in building the first railway in the region. The railway was built on land that he donated for the project.

=== Sports influence ===
When his son Prince Erich, who studied in Cambridge, brought to Lautschin a new game, he helped him establish the first football team in Bohemia (1889). The team made history when it played in the first official football match historically recorded in Bohemia (1893). The Lautschin team competed against Regatta, the best team in the Austrian-Hungarian Empire. The match took place at the famous Císařská louka in Prague on 18 April 1893 and ended with the Thurn Taxis team losing 0:5. This was still considered a great success for the Lautschin players and the Vienna newspapers Wiener Sportzeitung did not hesitate to conclude that the team from Lautschin was the second best team after Regatta in the Empire.

=== Burial place ===
The family's burial place is in Sýčina (Seitzin) near Dobrovice.

=== Legitimate offspring ===
Prince Alexander had three legitimate children:

- Erich (Mzells, 11 January 1876 – Kremsegg, 20 October 1952)
- Eugen (Prague, 27 March 1878 – Prague, 4 March 1903)
- Alexander (Mzells, 8 July 1881 – Duino, 11 March 1937)

Prince Erich married Countess Gabrielle Kinsky von Wchinitz und Tettau (eldest daughter of Rudolf, 9th Prince Kinsky of Wchinitz and Tettau) in 1903 and in 1925 moved to Austria where he died in 1952. He had nine children, and his son Alexander Ferdinand (1906–1992) held the Lautschin Castle until the end of the war in 1945 when it was confiscated by the Czechoslovak state (his cousin, Ludwig (Luigi) held Mzells Castle until 1948).

Prince Alexander married Princess Marie de Ligne (1885-1971), member of an ancient House of Ligne. Together they had three children:

- Raimundo (heir), married Princess Eugenie of Greece and Denmark and had issue
- Ludwig (b. 1908), married Frances Goodyear and had issue
- Margareta (1909-2006), married Prince Gaetano of Bourbon-Parma and had issue

They divorced in 1919.

In 1923 Prince Alexander left the dynastic House of Thurn und Taxis to become the first Duca di Castel Duino by grant of Victor Emmanuel III of Italy.

Alexander's sons Raimundo and Luigi joined their father and were recognized in Italy as Princes della Torre e Tasso. The prince's daughter Princess Margarita remained a member of the Thurn und Taxis family until her marriage in 1931 to a son of Robert I (former Sovereign of the independent Duchy of Parma), Prince Gaetano of Bourbon-Parma.

Alexander married American heiress Helen Holbrook Walker in Vrana.

After Alexander's death, the castle in Duino was inherited by his son Raimundo, 2nd Duke of Castel Duino (1907–1986), and then his grandson Carlo Alessandro, 3rd Duke of Castel Duino, and has remained a part of the Torre e Tasso family estate.

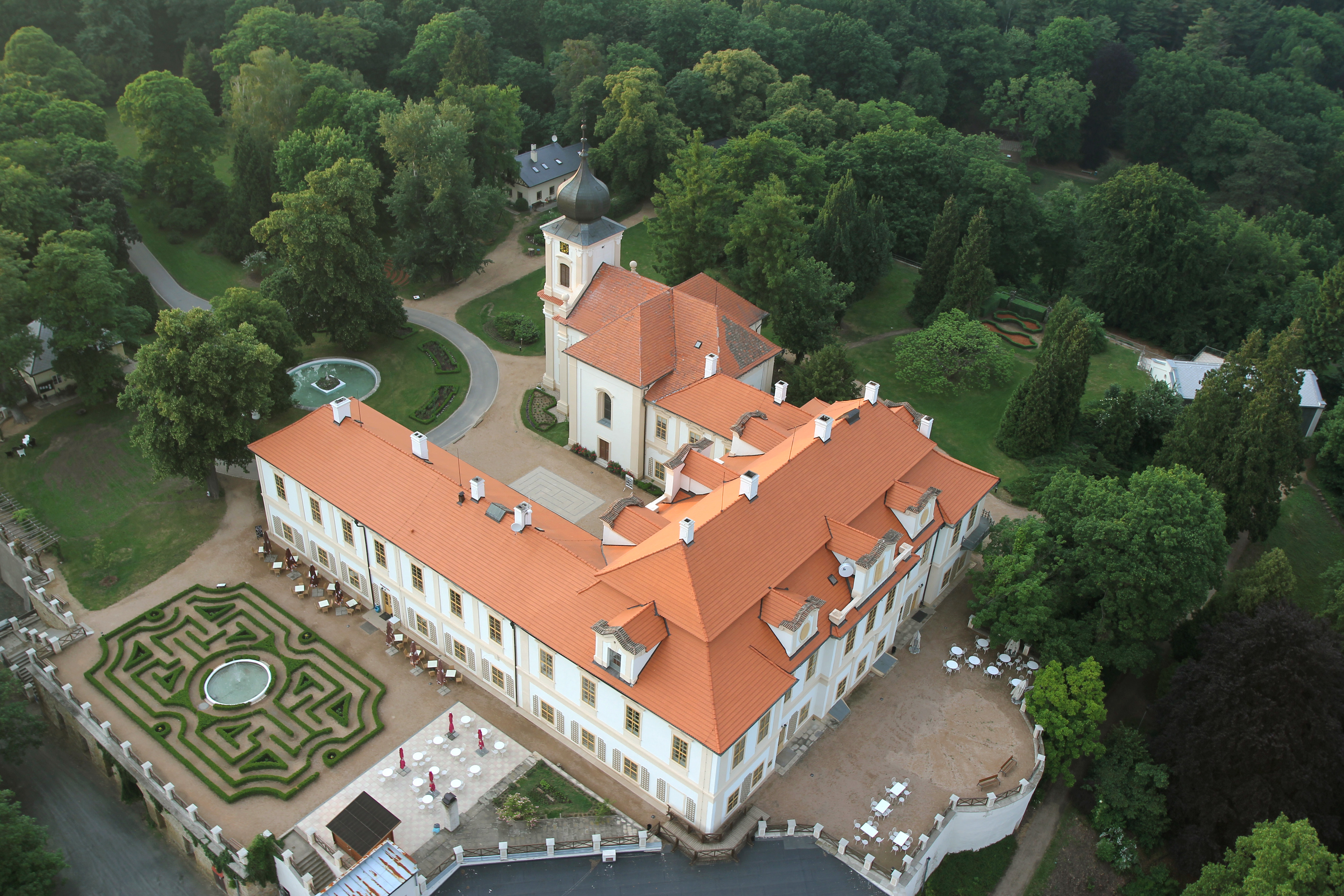
Loučeň (Lautschin, Luschen) Castle

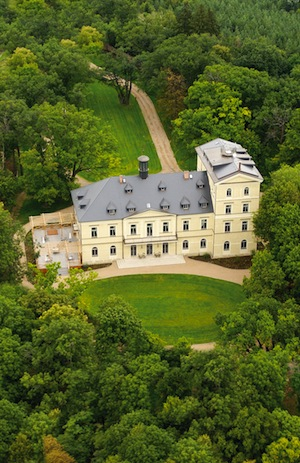
Mcely (Mutzel) Castle

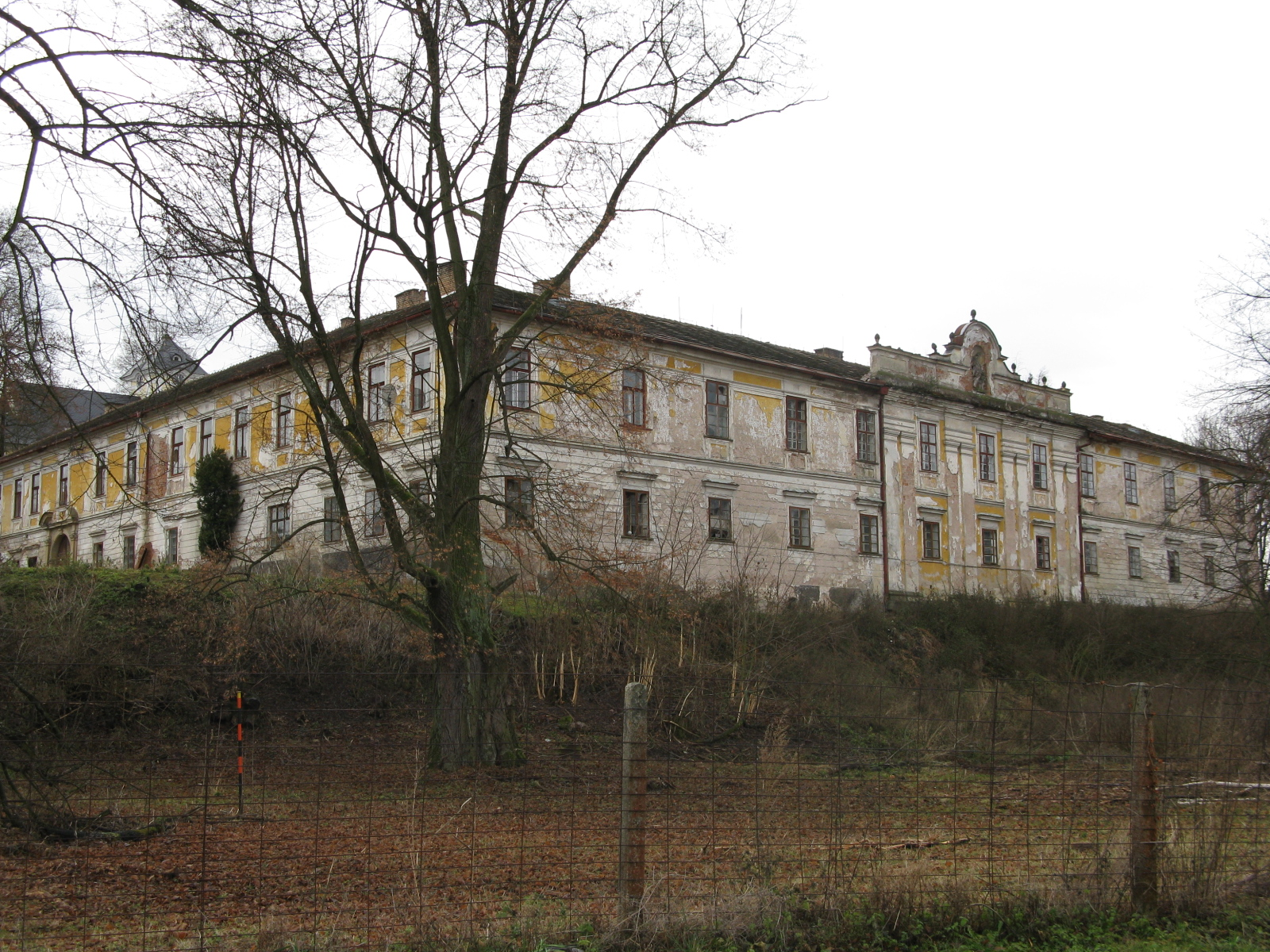
Biskupice (Biskupitz) Castle

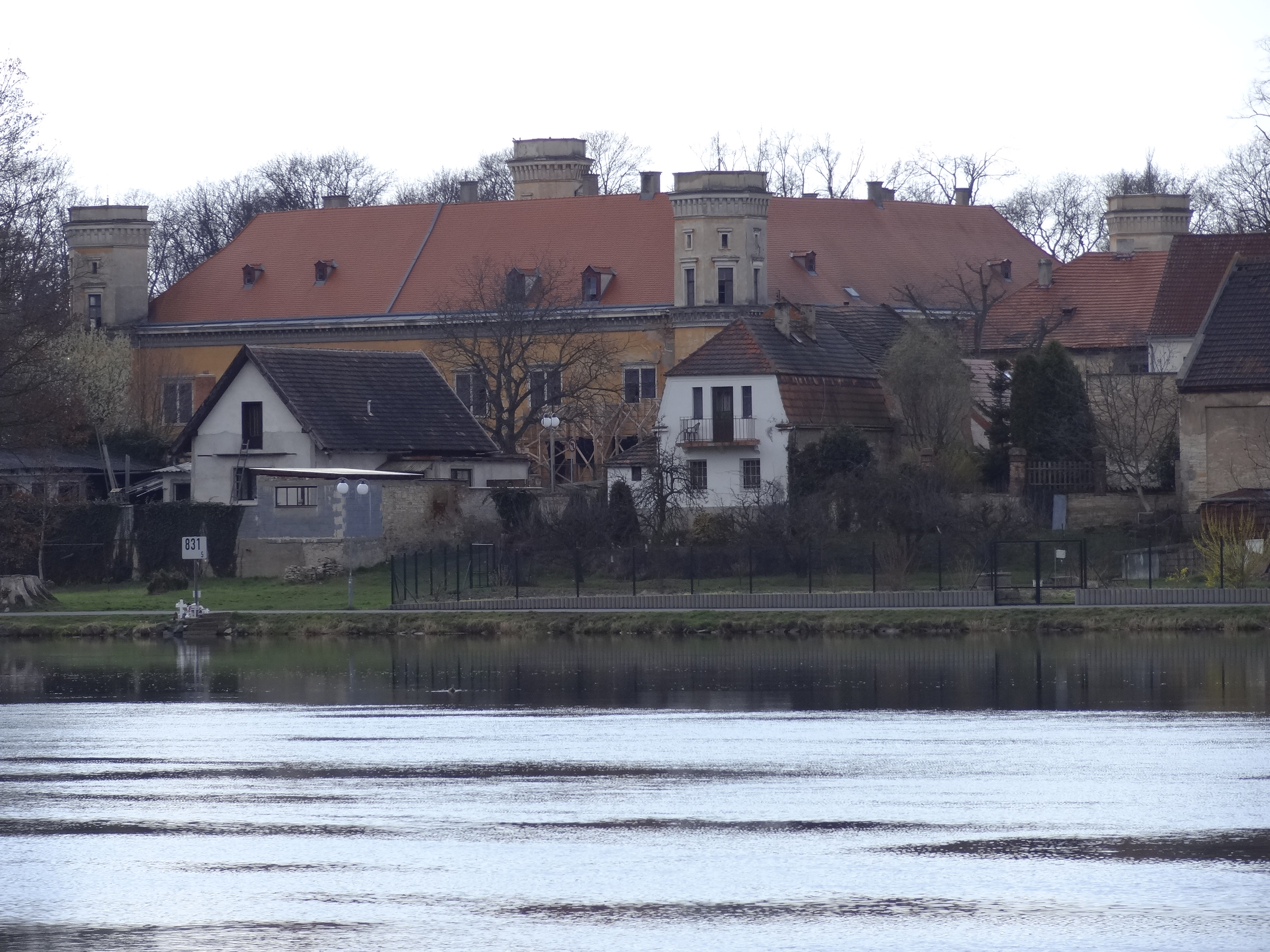
Dolní Beřkovice (Unter Berschkowitz) Castle

Duino Castle, Italy

== Bibliography ==
- Dragounová, Marie. 1922. Kronika rodu Dragounů, loučeňských poštmistrů. (Chronicle of the Dragoun Family, Postmasters at Loučeň). Unpublished text. Deposited in Státní archiv Nymburk.
- Dročár, Jan. Zapomenutý šlechtic, 25 June 2007, http://www.pozitivni-noviny.cz/cz/clanek-2007060059 (1 March 2008), Pozitivní noviny.
- FK Loučeň: Nejstarší fotbalový klub v Čechách (1893). 2003. Program guide. Published at the occasion of the 110th anniversary of the Loučeň Football Club.
- Mareček, Zdeněk. 1998. Loučeň a Thurn Taxisové: Pohledy do doby minulé i nedávné. Loučeň, Czech Republic: Obec Loučeň.
- Mareček, Zdeněk. 2003. Vyprávění o tom, jak fotbal na Loučeň přišel. Unpublished text.
- Nováček, Jiří. 2003. Čechy naučili hrát fotbal anglický komorník se zahradníkem. Unpublished text.
- Paine, Albert Bigelow. Mark Twain. eBooks@Adelaide. http://ebooks.adelaide.edu.au/t/twain/mark/paine/chapter206.html (31 March 2008), ebooks.adelaide.edu.au
- Thurn-Taxis, Marie. 1997. Rainer Maria Rilke v mých vzpomínkách. Praha: Nadace Arbor vitae.
- Votypka, Vladimír. 2005. Paradoxy české šlechty. Praha: Nakladatelství Dokořán.
- "Z tajností fotbalového pravěku". Stadion 32 (9 August 1988).
- Zapletal, Vladimír. JUDr. Rudolf Knize Thurn-Taxis. (2nd ed.) http://www.pozitivni-noviny.cz/cz/clanek-2007060063 (26 June 2007) Pozitivní noviny.
- Von Thurn und Taxis, Princess Marie, The Poet and The Princess: Memories of Rainer Maria Rilke, Amun Press, 2017
