= Alessandro, 1st Duke of Castel Duino =

Alessandro
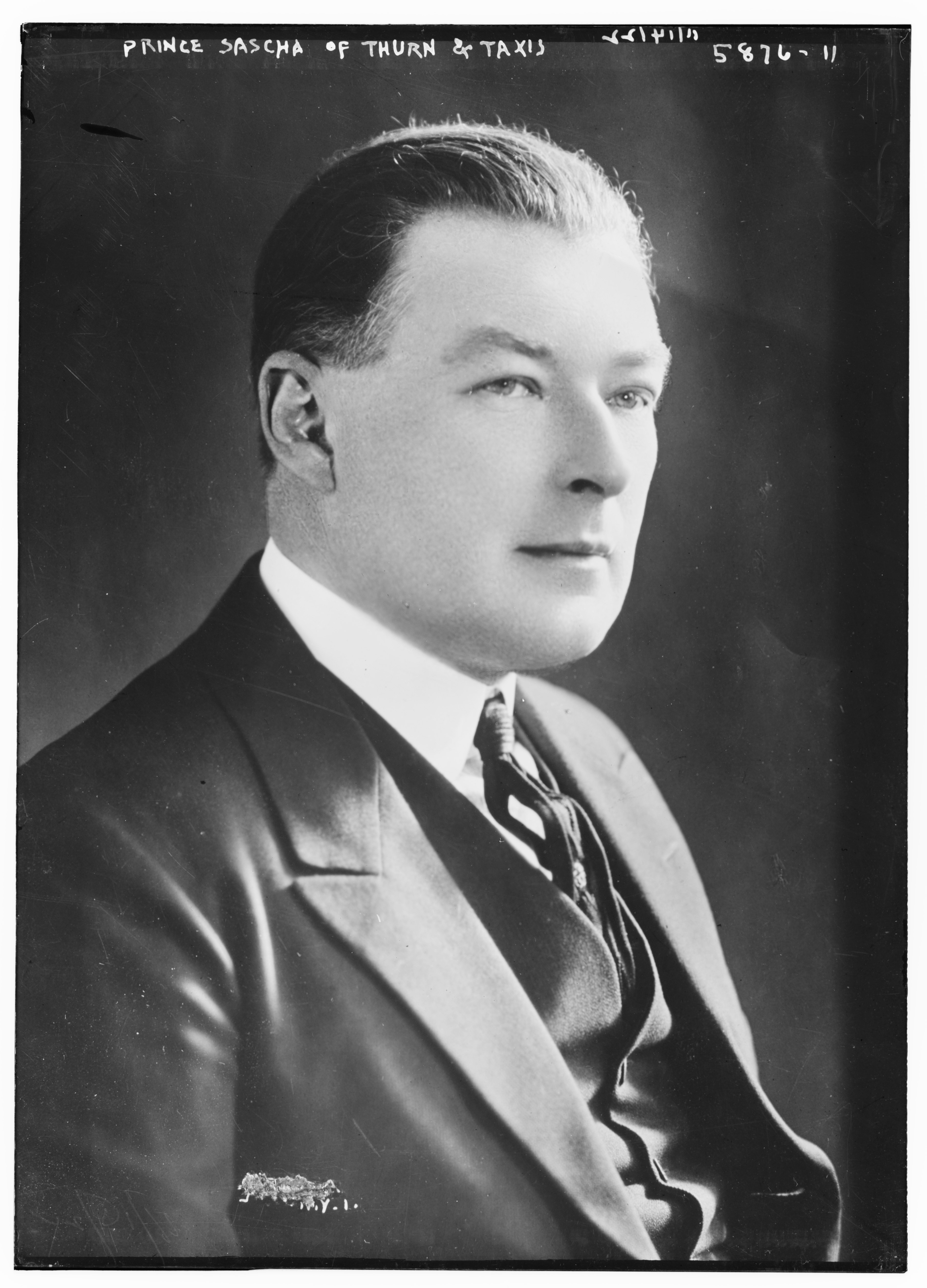
- Prince Alexander of Thurn and Taxis in 1922

Duke of Castel Duino
- Period: 1923 – 11 March 1937
- Predecessor: none
- Successor: Raimundo
- Born: 8 July 1881; Schloss Mzell, Mzell, Kingdom of Bohemia, Austria-Hungary
- Died: 11 March 1937 (aged 55); Castel Duino, Duino, Kingdom of Italy
- Spouse: Princess Marie of Ligne; Helen Holbrook Walker
- Issue: Raimundo, 2nd Duke of Castel Duino; Prince Ludwig; Princess Margarete
Names
- German: Alexander Karl Egon Theobald Lamoral Johann Baptist Maria
- House: Thurn and Taxis
- Father: Prince Alexander Johann of Thurn and Taxis
- Mother: Princess Marie of Hohenlohe-Waldenburg-Schillingsfürst

Prince Alessandro della Torre e Tasso, 1st Duke of Castel Duino, full German name: Alexander Karl Egon Theobald Lamoral Johann Baptist Maria, Prinz von Thurn und Taxis (8 July 1881 in Schloss Mzell, Mzell, Kingdom of Bohemia, Austria-Hungary – 11 March 1937 in Castel Duino, Duino, Kingdom of Italy) was a member of the Bohemian branch of the princely House of Thurn and Taxis. He was created Prince della Torre e Tasso and first Duke of Castel Duino by Victor Emmanuel III of Italy after relocating to the Kingdom of Italy in 1923.

== Family ==
Alessandro was the third child and son of Prince Alexander Johann of Thurn and Taxis and his wife Princess Marie of Hohenlohe-Waldenburg-Schillingsfürst. He was a great-great-great-grandson of Alexander Ferdinand, 3rd Prince of Thurn and Taxis.

== First marriage and issue ==
Alessandro's first marriage was to Princess Marie Susanne Marguerite Louise de Ligne, daughter of Louis, 9th Prince de Ligne and Elisabeth de La Rochefoucauld, daughter of Sosthène, Duc de Doudeauville, civilly on 27 January 1906 and religiously on 29 January 1906 in Paris. Alessandro and Marie had three children together:

- Prince Raimundo della Torre e Tasso, 2nd Duke of Castel Duino (Castel Duino 16 March 1907 – Castel Duino 17 March 1986), married Princess Eugénie of Greece and Denmark
- Prince Luigi della Torre e Tasso (Castel Duino 5 October 1908 – Camillus, New York 25 March 1985) married Frances Goodyear (granddaughter of Buffalo, New York industrialist Charles W. Goodyear in 1939. They divorced in 1948. Together they had one son, "Sascha" Alexander Frederick Bradley, Prince of Torre e Tasso (1940–2011).
- Princess Margarete of Thurn and Taxis (born at Château de Belœil on 8 November 1909 – died on 21 September 2006), married Prince Gaetano of Bourbon-Parma, youngest child of Robert I, Duke of Parma. Together they had one daughter, Princess Diane Marguerite of Bourbon-Parma.

Alessandro and Marie divorced in 1919.

== Second marriage ==
In 1932, in Vrana, Alessandro married American heiress Helena "Ella" Holbrook Walker.

Ella lived many years beyond her husband's death in 1937, and worked on the upkeep of the family's property, Villa Serbelloni at Bellagio, Lombardy, Italy, and left it to the Rockefeller Foundation in her will.

== Ancestry ==
Ancestors of Alessandro, 1st Duke of Castel Duino

8. Prince Karl Anselm of Thurn and Taxis
4. Prince Hugo Maximilian of Thurn and Taxis
9. Countess Marie Isabelle zu Eltz
2. Prince Alexander Johann of Thurn and Taxis
10. Count Eduard von Belcredi
5. Countess Almeria von Belcredi
11. Countess Marie von Fünfkirchen
1. Alessandro, 1st Duke of Castel Duino
12. Charles Albert III, Prince of Hohenlohe-Waldenburg-Schillingsfürst
6. Prince Egon of Hohenlohe-Waldenburg-Schillingsfürst
13. Princess Maria Leopoldina of Fürstenberg
3. Princess Marie of Hohenlohe-Waldenburg-Schillingsfürst
14. Count Johann Baptist von Thurn und Valsassina
7. Countess Theresa von Thurn-Hofer-Valsassina
15. Countess Polyxena Brigido

Alessandro, 1st Duke of Castel Duino House of Thurn and Taxis Cadet branch of the House of Tassis Born: 8 July 1881 Died: 11 March 1937
Italian nobility
Preceded by New creation	Duke of Castel Duino; 1923 – 11 March 1937	Succeeded by Raimundo
