= Duke of Castel Duino =

Italian noble title

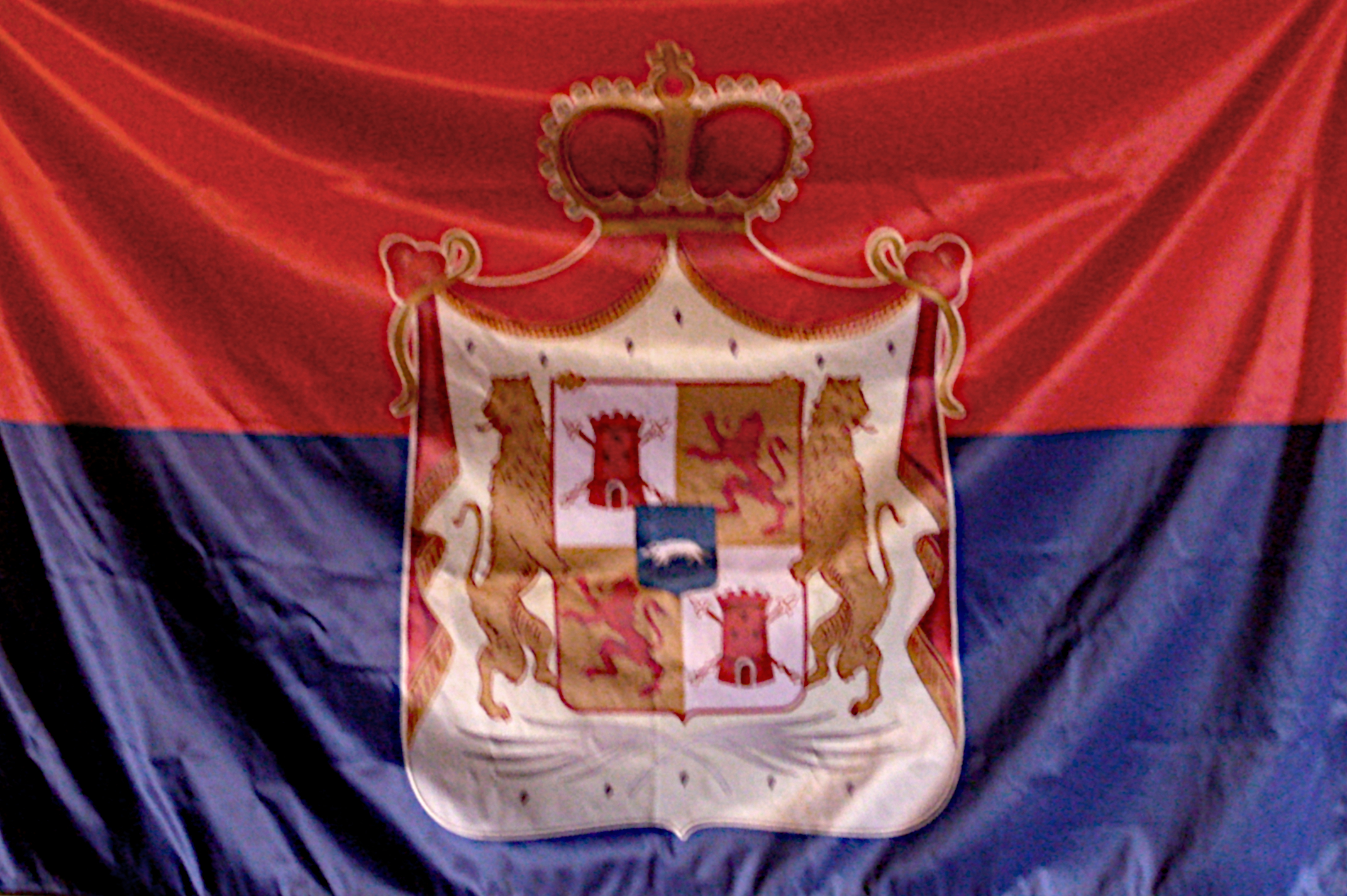
Flag with the Coat of Arms of della Torre and Tasso family

The Dukes of Castel Duino are a noble family in Italy descending from the Bohemian line of the Princely House of Thurn and Taxis.

== History ==
The title was created along with the additional title of Principe della Torre e Tasso in 1934 for Prince Alexander of Thurn and Taxis following his naturalisation in the Kingdom of Italy. The second duke, Raimondo, married Princess Eugénie of Greece and Denmark a member of the Greek Royal Family.

The main seat of the family is Duino Castle in Duino in the Province of Trieste, Friuli-Venezia Giulia.

== Dukes of Castel Duino (1934-present) ==
- Prince Alessandro della Torre e Tasso, 1st Duke of Castel Duino (1881–1937), son of Prince Alexander Johann of Thurn and Taxis and Princess Marie of Hohenlohe-Waldenburg- Schillingsfürst
- Prince Raimondo della Torre e Tasso, 2nd Duke of Castel Duino (1907–1986)
- Prince Carlo Alessandro della Torre e Tasso, 3rd Duke of Castel Duino (born 1952)

The heir is Prince Dimitri della Torre e Tasso (born 1977).
