= Raimundo, 2nd Duke of Castel Duino =

Raimondo

Duke of Castel Duino
- Period: 11 March 1937 – 17 March 1986
- Predecessor: Alessandro
- Successor: Carlo Alessandro
- Born: 16 March 1907; Duino Castle, Austrian Littora, Austria-Hungary
- Died: 17 March 1986 (aged 79); Duino Castle, Friuli-Venezia Giulia, Italy
- Burial: Duino Castle, Friuli-Venezia Giulia, Italy
- Spouse: Princess Eugénie of Greece and Denmark (m. 1949; div. 1965)
- Issue: Carlo Alessandro, 3rd Duke of Castel Duino
Names
- Raimondo Alexander Maria Louis Lamoral
- House: Thurn and Taxis
- Father: Alessandro, 1st Duke of Castel Duino
- Mother: Princess Marie Suzanne Marguerite of Ligne

Raimondo, Prince della Torre e Tasso, 2nd Duke of Castel Duino (16 March 1907 – 17 March 1986) was an Italian Duke of German ancestry.

== Early life and ancestry ==
Descending from the Bohemian line of the House of Thurn und Taxis, he was the son of Alessandro, 1st Duke of Castel Duino and his French wife, Princess Marie Suzanne Marguerite de Ligne.

== Duke of Castel Duino ==
His father was naturalised in Italy in 1923 with the title Prince della Torre e Tasso and was also created Duke of Castel Duino. Raimundo succeeded as the 2nd Duke of Castel Duino following the death of his father on 11 March 1937.

== Marriage and issue ==
He was married to Princess Eugénie of Greece and Denmark on 28 November 1949 in Athens, who was previously married to Prince Dominik Rainer Radziwiłł. They divorced on 11 May 1965, having had one son who succeeded Raimondo as the 3rd duke of Castel Duino.

- Carlo Alessandro, 3rd Duke of Castel Duino (born 1952)

Together with his wife Eugénie, Raimundo took part in the ship tour organized by Queen Frederica and her husband King Paul of Greece in 1954, which became known as the "Cruise of the Kings" and was attended by over 100 royals from all over Europe.

== Ancestry ==
Ancestors of Raimundo, 2nd Duke of Castel Duino

8. Prince Hugo Maximilian of Thurn and Taxis
4. Prince Alexander Johann of Thurn and Taxis
9. Countess Almeria von Belcredi
2. Alessandro, 1st Duke of Castel Duino
10. Prince Egon of Hohenlohe-Waldenburg-Schillingsfürst
5. Princess Maria of Hohenlohe-Waldenburg-Schillingsfürst
11. Countess Theresa von Thurn-Hofer-Valsássina
1. Raimondo, 2nd Duke of Castel Duino
12. Henri, Hereditary Prince de Ligne
6. Louis, 9th Prince de Ligne
13. Marguerite de Talleyrand-Périgord
3. Princess Marie of Ligne
14. Sosthène de La Rochefoucauld, Duc de Doudeauville
7. Elisabeth de la Rochefoucauld
15. Princess Marie de Ligne

Raimundo, 2nd Duke of Castel Duino House of Thurn and Taxis Cadet branch of the House of Tassis Born: 16 March 1907 Died: 17 March 1986
Italian nobility
Preceded by Alessandro	Duke of Castel Duino; 11 March 1937 – 17 March 1986	Succeeded by Carlo Alessandro
