= Straßberg, Zollernalbkreis =

German municipality

Straßberg
- Municipality
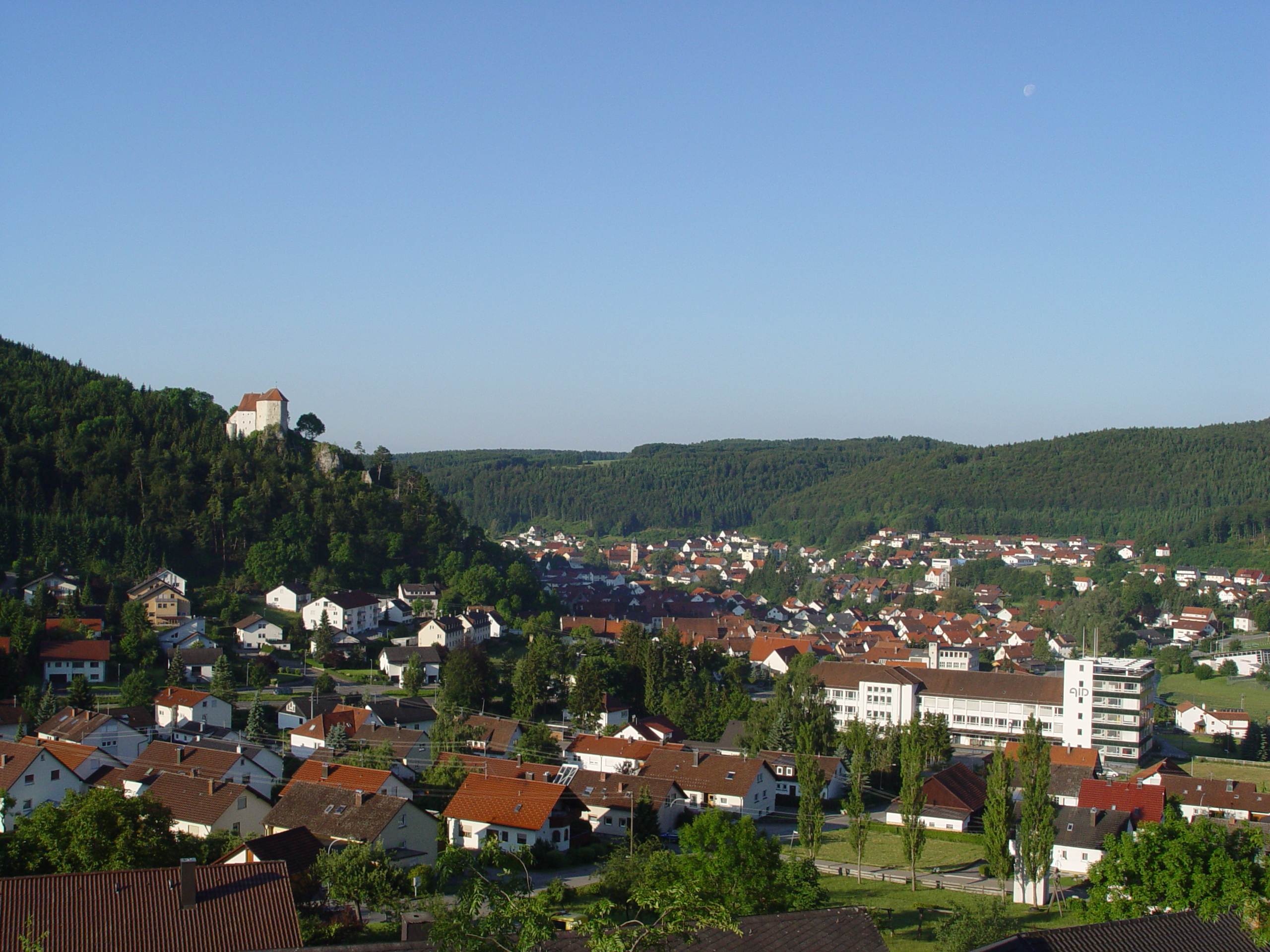
- Straßberg

- Coat of arms

- Location of Straßberg within Zollernalbkreis district
- Interactive map of Straßberg
- Location within Germany Location within Baden-Württemberg
- Coordinates: 48°10′49″N 09°05′16″E
- Country: Germany
- State: Baden-Württemberg
- Admin. region: Tübingen
- District: Zollernalbkreis

Government
  - Mayor (2022–30): Markus Zeiser

Area
  - Total: 24.91 km^{2} (9.62 sq mi)
- Elevation: 682 m (2,238 ft)

Population (2025-12-31)
  - Total: 2,479
  - Density: 99.52/km^{2} (257.8/sq mi)
- Time zone: UTC+01:00 (CET)
  - Summer (DST): UTC+02:00 (CEST)
- Postal codes: 72479
- Dialling codes: 07434
- Vehicle registration: BL
- Website: www.strassberg.de

Straßberg (German pronunciation: [ˈʃtʁaːsbɛʁk]) is a municipality of the Zollernalb district of Baden-Württemberg, Germany.

== History ==
From 1625 until 1803, when it was dissolved during German mediatization, Straßberg was a possession of Buchau Abbey. The County of Thurn und Taxis, which was first awarded the township, ceded it in 1806 to Hohenzollern-Sigmaringen. In 1836, an Oberamt was organized for the locality that was in 1854 merged into Oberamt Gammertingen. In 1925, that district was dissolved and Straßberg was assigned to Landkreis Sigmaringen. Straßberg began a period of physical expansion in the 1950s to the south, and again in the 1970s to the east.

== Geography ==
The municipality (Gemeinde) of Straßberg is located in the Zollernalb district of Baden-Württemberg, one of the states of the Federal Republic of Germany. It lies at the southwest edge of Zollernalb, along the border with Sigmaringen district. It is physically located in the Middle Kuppenalb, in the valley of the Schmeie. The water that streams then on to the Danube.

9, though a portion of the municipality is located in the Großer Heuberg to the west. Elevation above sea level in the municipal area ranges from a high of 901 meters (2,956 ft) Normalnull (NN) to a low of 630 meters (2,070 ft) NN.

A portion of the Federally-protected Eselmühle nature reserve is located in Straßberg's municipal area.

=== Smuggling until 1835 ===
Within the Heuberg Training Area there is the legendary Dreibannmarke, also called the "Bahn", a 17th-century border, which today marks the border between three different municipalities, formerly in the three states of Württemberg, Baden, and Hohenzollern. The meadow at the Dreibannmarke served as a stopping place for traveling merchants, wagons and craftsmen. With care it is possible to identify traces of the border. After the inauguration of the firing ranges, a meadow was allocated to the Gypsies as a camping site at the edge of the restricted area. Until 1835 merchants were smuggled over the customs borders guarded by local hunters. Smuggling across the border (Württemberg, Baden, Province of Hohenzollern) in Meßstetten to, from Meßsteten- Heinstetten, Straßberg. 30.000 bibles (Martin Luther) to Habsburg: Hans Ungnad von Weißenwolff, Freiherr von Sonneck, Hans III. (1493–1564), famous bible printer and smuggler in Bad Urach The smuggler was called Schwärzer in the local dialect due to the black camouflage color on his face.

== Religions ==
The following religions are present in Straßberg:

- Roman Catholic Church
- Evangelische Landeskirche in Württemberg before 1950 Kirchenkreis Hohenzollern Evangelische Kirche im Rheinland Old Prussian Mass in Hohenzollern possible by wish.

== Coat of arms ==
Straßberg's coat of arms is divided in half vertically into a section with a red cross upon a white field, and a white pitcher upon a red field. The left half is the coats of arms of Buchau Abbey, impaled with the attribute of St. Verena, Straßberg's patron saint. The coat of arms was awarded on 26 June 1950 by the post-WWII provisional Württemberg-Hohenzollern government. A corresponding flag was issued by the Zollernalb district office on 17 July 1968.

== Transportation ==
The Tübingen–Sigmaringen railway runs through Straßberg. Local public transportation is provided by the Verkehrsverbund Neckar-Alb-Donau.

== Notable people ==
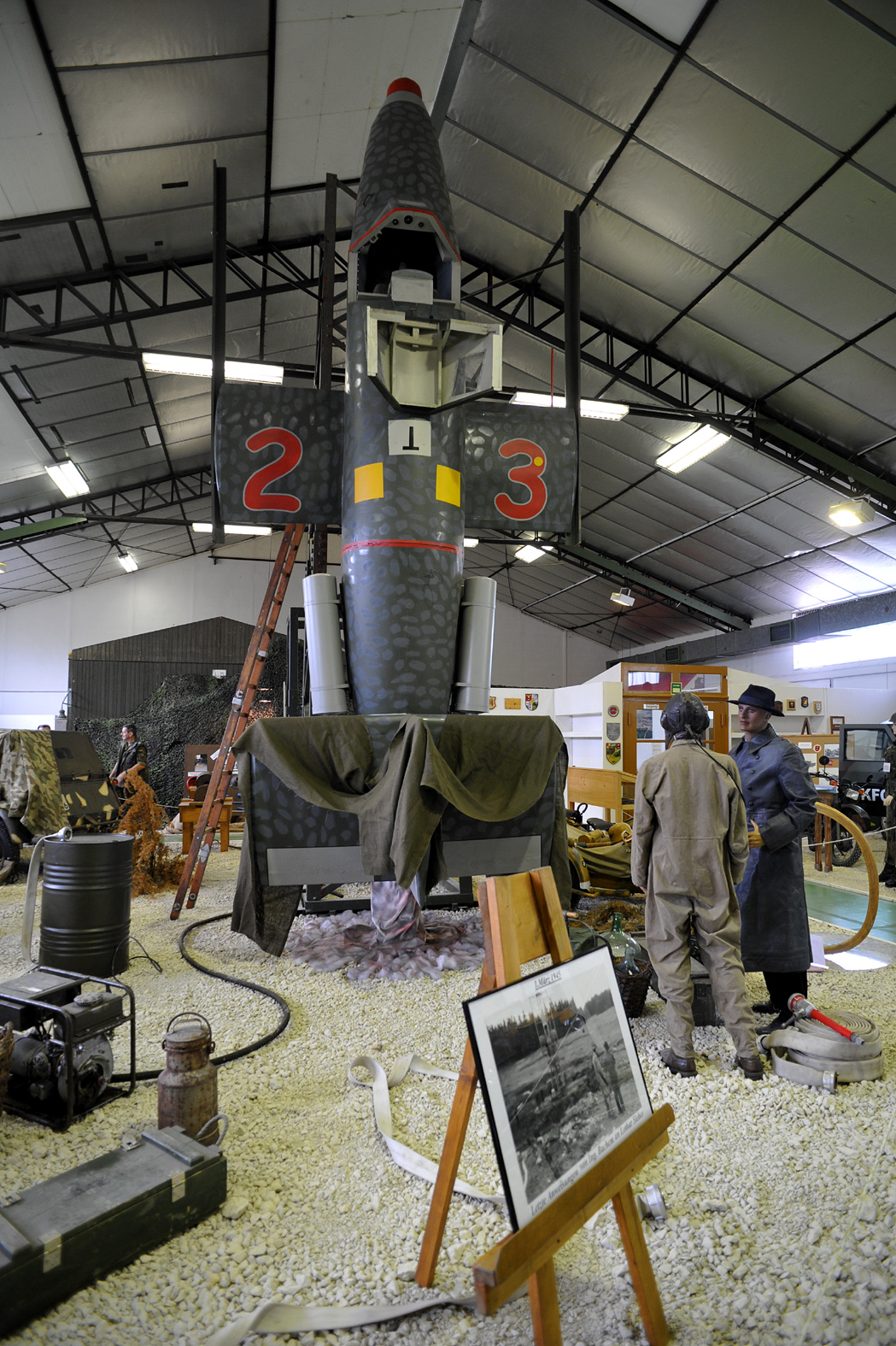
Trailing scene, Sieber discusses with Erich Bachem in Straßberg Kaiseringen the final launch preparations, at the Militärgeschichtliche Sammlung Stetten am kalten Markt

- Elsa Rainherin, burned as a witch in 1566.
- Jan von Werth (1591-1651) married 1637 in Straßberg, St Verena
- Katharina Geiger (1694-1743), accused witch
- Hermann Antom Bantle (1872-1930) painter Beuron Art School
- Lothar Sieber (1922-1945) killed test pilot of Staßberg Kaiseringen on the Ochsenkopf. The rockets crashed down in Nusplingen near Stetten akM.
- Claudia Welz (1974); theologian
