= Buchau Abbey =

Monastery

Coordinates: 48°4′3″N 9°36′42″E

Imperial Abbey of Buchau on the Federsee Reichsstift Buchau am Federsee
- 1347–1803
- Status: Imperial Abbey
- Capital: Buchau Abbey
- Common languages: Alemannic
- Government: Elective principality
- Historical era: Early modern period
  - Founded: 770
  - Raised to princely status, gained Imp. immediacy: 1347
  - Converted to secular foundation: 1415
  - Gained sovereignty over Straßberg: 1625
  - Mediatised to Thurn und Taxis: 1803
  - Ceded to Württemberg: 1806
Preceded by	Succeeded by
Bad Buchau	House of Thurn und Taxis
- Today part of: Germany

Buchau Abbey, otherwise the Imperial Abbey of Buchau (German: Reichsstift Buchau), was a self-ruling Imperial Estate and its abbess had a seat and vote at the Imperial Diet.

== History ==
According to tradition, the monastery was founded around 770 on an island in the Federsee by the Frankish Count Warin, his wife Adelindis von Buchau (still commemorated in the local Adelindisfest).

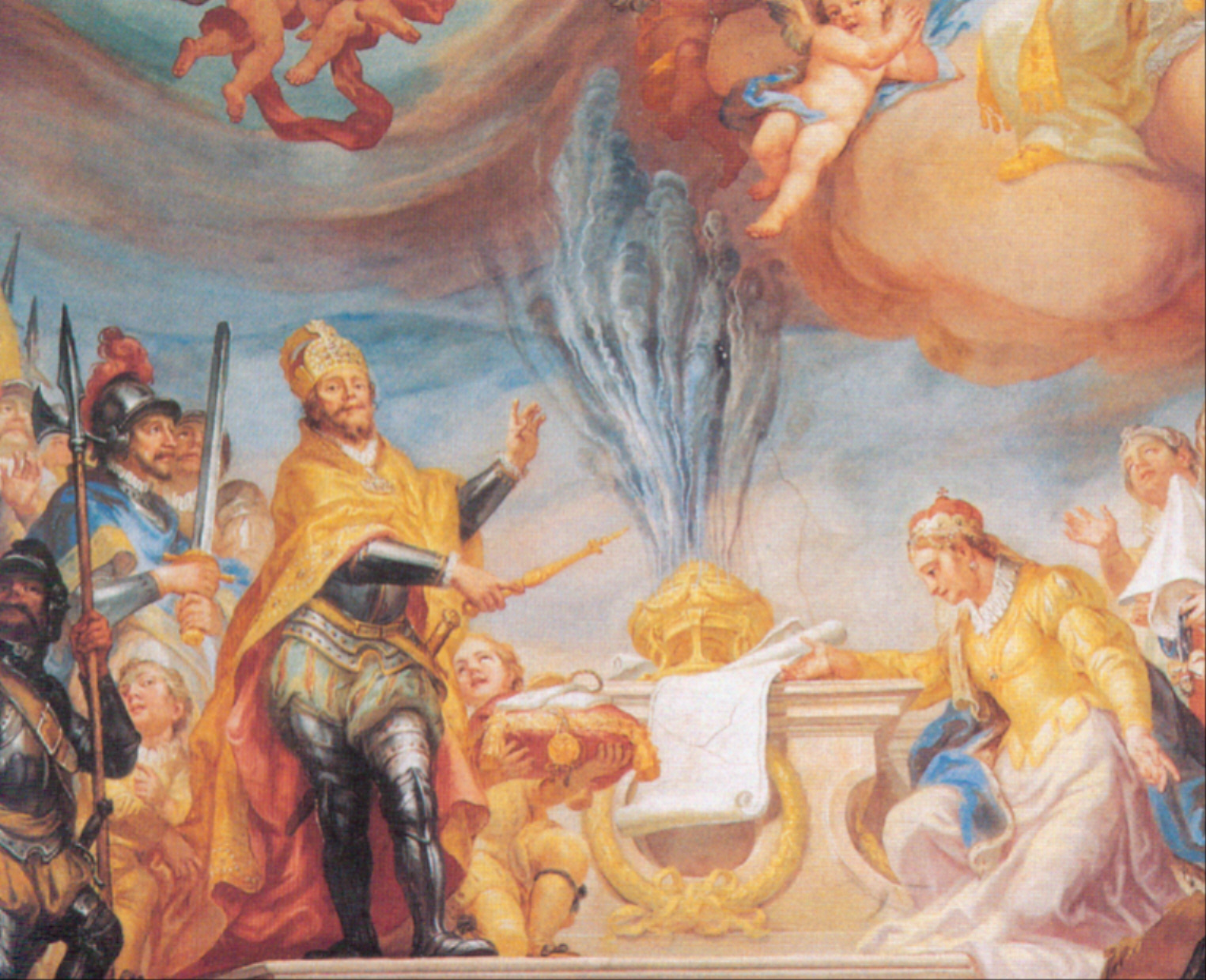
Allegorical ceiling painting of the Baroque abbey church showing Louis the Pious and Adelindis, founders of Buchau Abbey

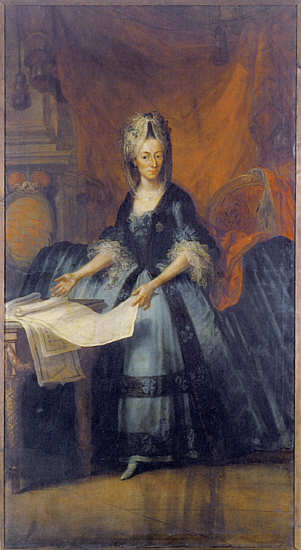
Maria Carolina von Königsegg-Rothenfels, Princess-Abbess of Buchau (1742–1774)

Whether Buchau was initially a house of canonesses regular or a Benedictine abbey is unclear. The abbey was put on a secure financial footing by Louis the Pious, who in 819 granted the nuns property in Mengen. In 857, Louis the German declared it a private religious house of the Carolingian Imperial family, appointed as abbess his daughter Irmingard (died 16 July 866), and granted the abbey lands at Saulgau.

In the 13th century the town of Buchau, which had grown up in the immediate vicinity of the abbey, gained the status of a Free imperial city after a long period of strife between the townspeople and the abbey. From then on and until 1803, Buchau Abbey and the Imperial City of Buchau, both self-governing entities fully independent of each other, were compelled to coexist. Unlike most of the other Free Imperial Cities, Buchau was to remain Catholic in the course of the Reformation.

In 1347, Buchau Abbey gained Imperial immediacy and the abbess was raised to the rank of Princess-Abbess. The abbey was an Imperial Estate and its abbess had a seat and vote at the Imperial Diet.

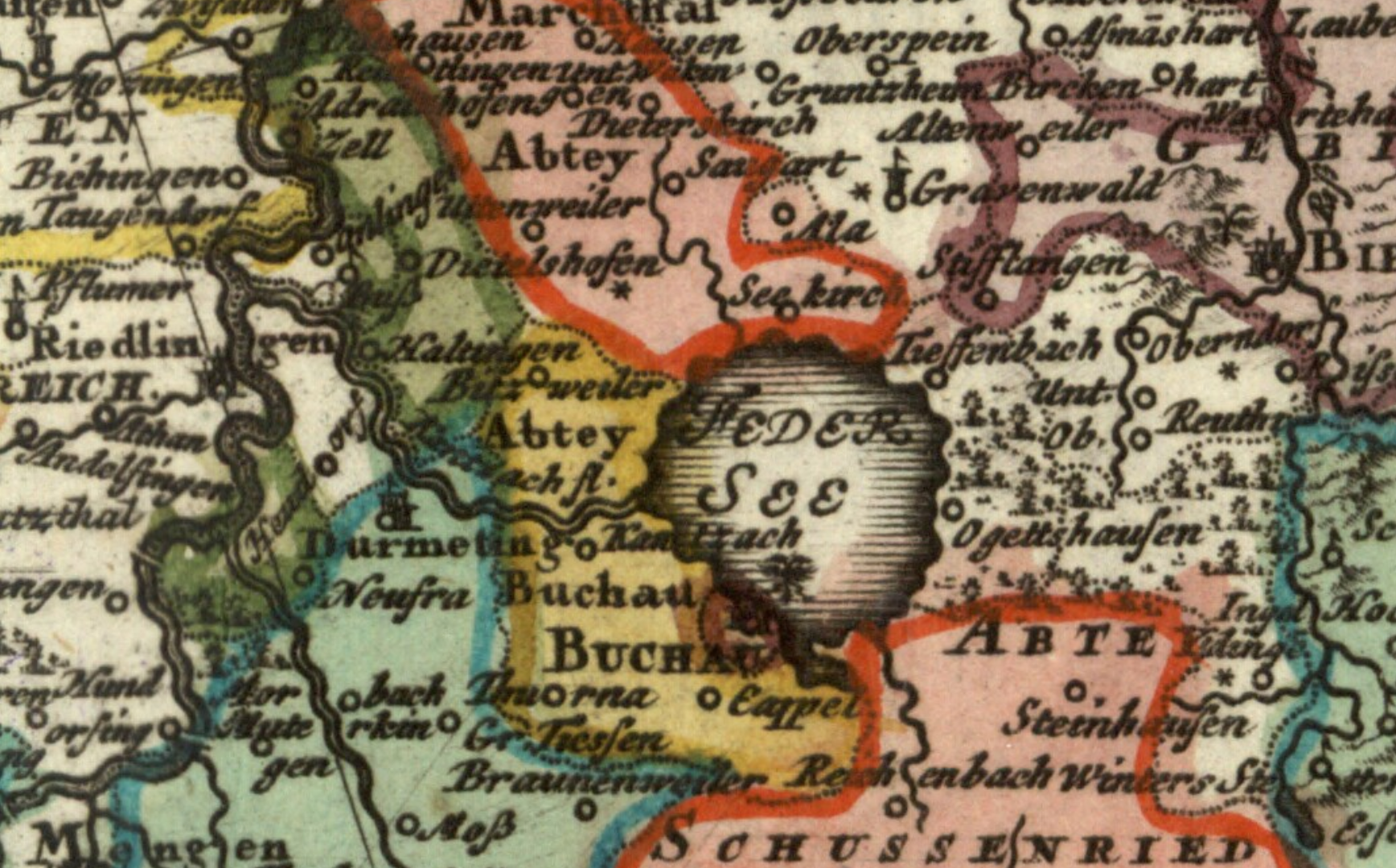
Detail of a mid-18th century map showing the territory of Buchau Abbey

In 1415, the abbey became a secular foundation and from then on the congregation was to be composed of an abbess, twelve canonesses choral (choir women or Chorfrauen) and two chaplains. Buchau Abbey had a small territorial base and in 1625 the lordship of Strassberg also became part of the abbey's possessions.

In the course of the secularisation of 1803, Buchau Abbey was dissolved like all the other Imperial abbeys and its territory and assets passed first to the prince of Thurn und Taxis, then to the Kingdom of Württemberg in 1806. The lordship of Strassberg however was annexed to the Principality of Hohenzollern-Sigmaringen.

The abbey church of Saints Cornelius and Cyprian, one of the first neo-classical buildings in southern Germany and still showing some late Baroque features, was built between 1774 and 1776 by Pierre Michel d'Ixnard as a conversion and refurbishment of a Gothic church. It includes stucco sculptures by Johann Joseph Christian.

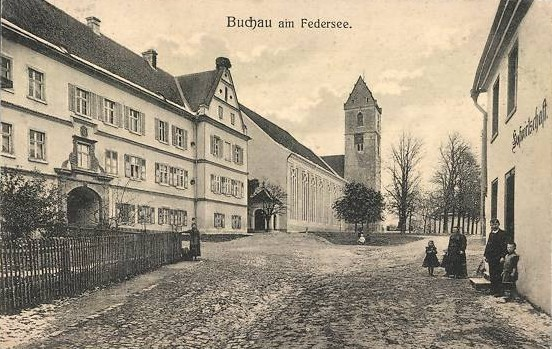
The former abbey and monastic church in the late 19th century
