= Schwenningen =

Schwenningen is the name of several locations in Germany:

- Schwenningen, Bavaria
- Schwenningen, Sigmaringen
- Villingen-Schwenningen
