= Niměřice =

- Municipality
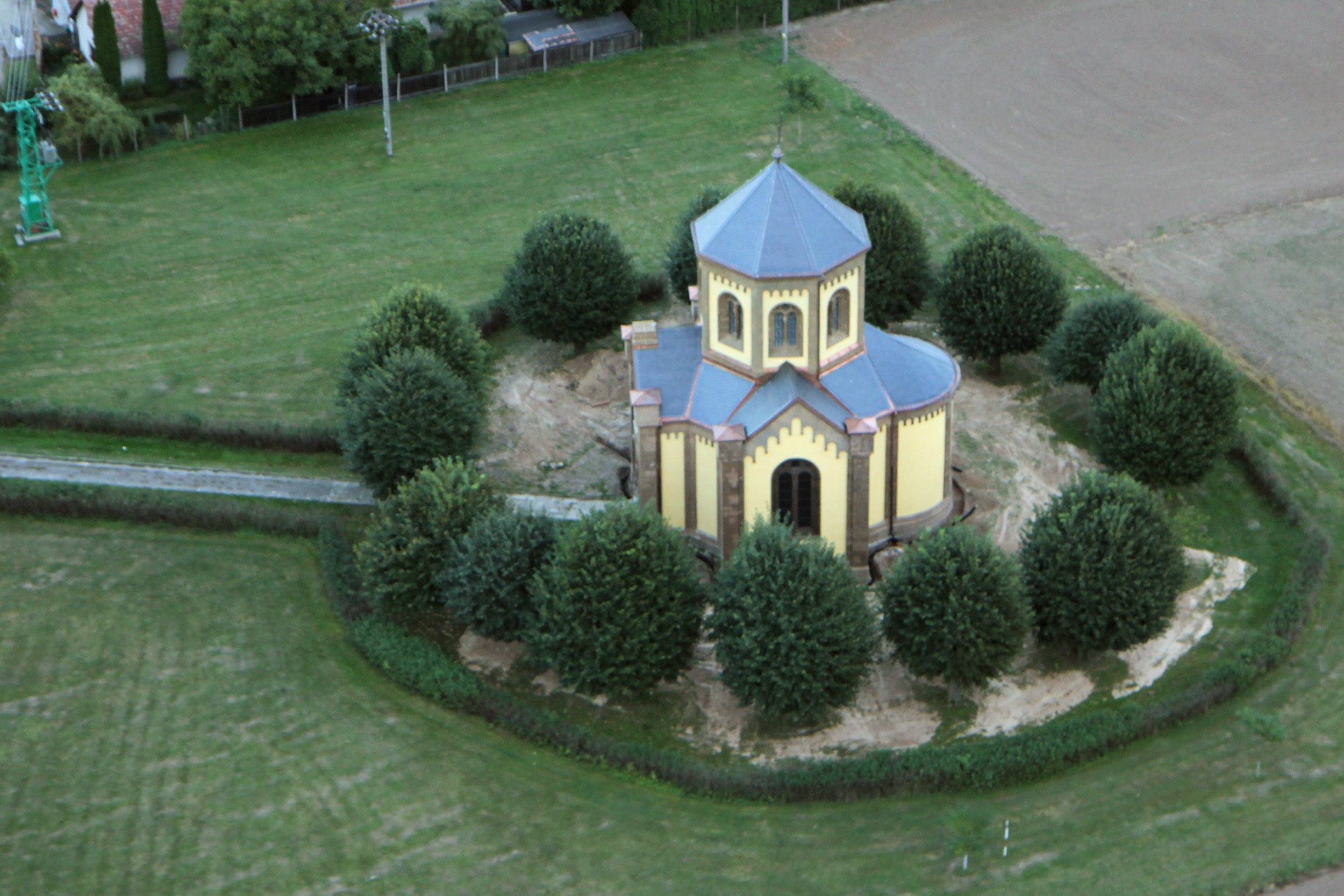
- Chapel of the Coronation of the Virgin Mary

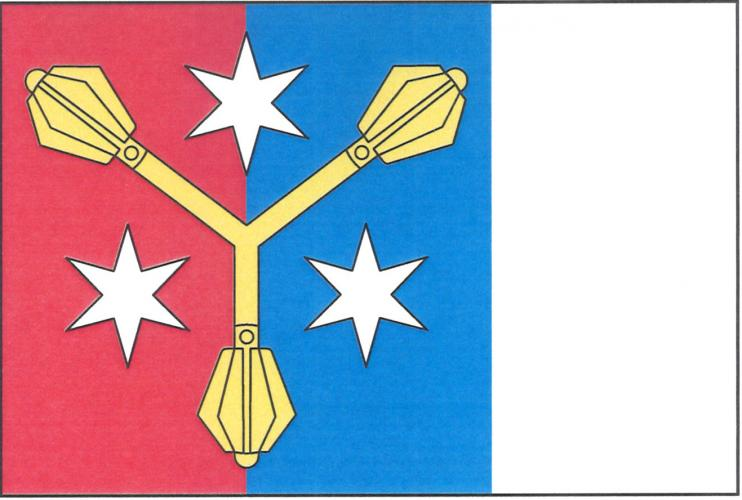
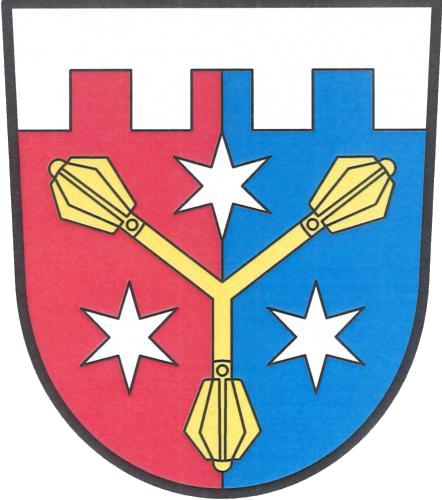
- Flag Coat of arms

- Location in the Czech Republic
- Coordinates: 50°23′45″N 14°48′31″E
- Country: Czech Republic
- Region: Central Bohemian
- District: Mladá Boleslav
- First mentioned: 1360

Area
  - Total: 4.26 km^{2} (1.64 sq mi)
- Elevation: 285 m (935 ft)

Population (2026-01-01)
  - Total: 309
  - Density: 72.5/km^{2} (188/sq mi)
- Time zone: UTC+1 (CET)
  - Summer (DST): UTC+2 (CEST)
- Postal code: 294 30
- Website: www.nimerice.cz

Niměřice is a municipality and village in Mladá Boleslav District in the Central Bohemian Region of the Czech Republic. It has about 300 inhabitants.

== Administrative division ==
Niměřice consists of three municipal parts (in brackets population according to the 2021 census):

- Niměřice (37)
- Dolní Cetno (129)
- Horní Cetno (167)

== Demographics ==
Historical population
Year	Pop.	±%
1869	731	—
1880	882	+20.7%
1890	822	−6.8%
1900	790	−3.9%
1910	814	+3.0%
1921	713	−12.4%
1930	645	−9.5%
1950	449	−30.4%
1961	539	+20.0%
1970	471	−12.6%
1980	369	−21.7%
1991	265	−28.2%
2001	256	−3.4%
2011	312	+21.9%
2021	333	+6.7%
Source: Censuses
