= Princess Eugénie of Greece and Denmark =

Princess Eugenie
- Princess Eugenie Radziwiłł; Duchess of Castel Duino
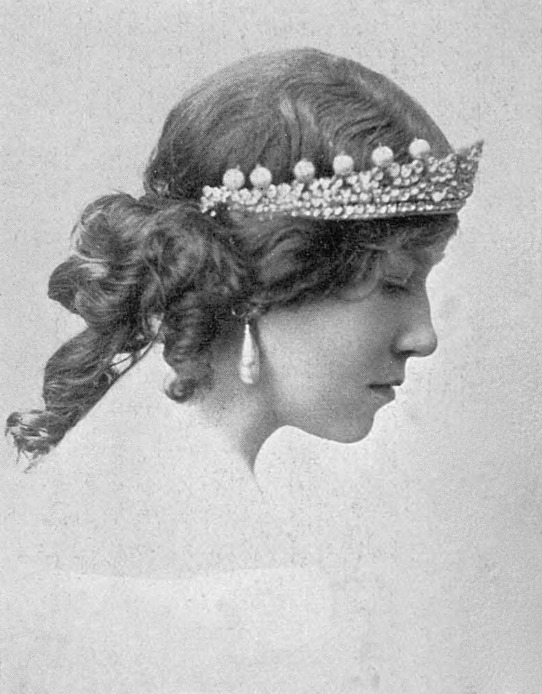
- Princess Eugenie in 1934
- Born: 10 February 1910; Paris, France
- Died: 13 February 1989 (aged 79); Geneva, Switzerland
- Burial: Duino Castle, Friuli-Venezia Giulia, Italy
- Spouse: Prince Dominik Radziwiłł (m. 1938; div. 1946) Prince Raimundo, Duke of Castel Duino (m. 1949; div. 1965)
- Issue: Princess Tatiana Radziwiłł; Prince Jerzy Radziwiłł; Prince Carlo Alessandro, Duke of Castel Duino
- House: Glücksburg
- Father: Prince George of Greece and Denmark
- Mother: Marie Bonaparte

Princess Eugenie of Greece and Denmark (Greek: Ευγενία, romanized: Evyenía; 10 February 1910 – 13 February 1989) was by birth member of the Greek royal family and by marriage member of the House of Radziwiłł and House of Thurn und Taxis.

The daughter of Prince George of Greece and Denmark and Marie Bonaparte, Eugenie was brought up in France in a cosmopolitan family environment that included members of European royal houses and prominent intellectuals. Her godmother was Empress Eugénie of France, the widow of Napoleon III. Eugenie's childhood was marked by a complicated relationship with her parents, her close bond with her elder brother Prince Peter of Greece and Denmark, and a prolonged illness during adolescence. Through her mother, she became acquainted with Sigmund Freud and developed an interest in psychoanalysis.

Eugenie married Prince Dominik Rainer Radziwiłł in 1938 and had two children. During the Second World War, she and her family lived in exile in southern Africa, where she worked as a nurse. After her first marriage ended in divorce, she married Prince Raimundo della Torre e Tasso, Duke of Castel Duino, in 1949. They had a son and divorced in 1965. In later life, Eugenie pursued historical research, publishing a biography of her great-grandfather Pierre-Napoléon Bonaparte in 1963. Her research into the life of Tsarevich Alexei of Russia, based partly on documents she discovered among her family's papers, resulted in a book published posthumously in 1990.

== Early life and education ==
=== Childhood and family relationships ===
Eugenie was born in Paris, France, on 10 February 1910, the younger child and only daughter of Prince George of Greece and Denmark and his wife, Marie Bonaparte. Her father was the second son of George I of Greece and Olga Constantinovna of Russia. Her mother was the daughter of Prince Roland Bonaparte and Marie-Félix Blanc, and a great-granddaughter of Lucien Bonaparte, one of the brothers of Napoleon I. Eugenie had one elder brother, Prince Peter of Greece and Denmark.

Eugenie's godmother was Eugénie de Montijo, the former Empress of the French and widow of Napoleon III. Despite this connection to the Bonaparte and imperial French families, Eugenie's upbringing was shaped principally by her parents' life in France and their connections to the Greek and Danish royal families.

She spent most of her childhood and adolescence between the family residences in Saint-Cloud and on the Avenue d'Iéna in Paris. Her maternal grandfather, Roland Bonaparte, also maintained residences in Paris. Eugenie's connections with Greece were comparatively distant during her early years. The First World War and its consequences for the Greek royal family, followed by the proclamation of the Second Hellenic Republic in 1924, prevented her from visiting Greece for many years. Between 1912 and 1936, she did not return to the country.

Instead, Eugenie became familiar with Denmark, where the family spent their summers at Bernstorff Palace in Gentofte. They stayed with her great-uncle, Prince Valdemar of Denmark, who had maintained a close relationship with Eugenie's father since 1883. Valdemar and Prince George had a long-standing romantic relationship, and Eugenie and Peter affectionately called Valdemar Papa Two.

The relationships within Eugenie's immediate family were affectionate at times but complicated. Her mother had lost her own mother, Marie-Félix Blanc, shortly after birth and had experienced a difficult relationship with her father, Roland Bonaparte. As a parent, Marie could alternate between being emotionally distant and overprotective. Although she espoused egalitarian principles, she tended to favour her son Peter, which sometimes made Eugenie jealous. Eugenie also felt that her father would have preferred another son and that he did not love her as much as she wanted. Prince George could be distant towards his daughter, and their relationship was strained for periods of her childhood and adolescence.

Like many children of royal families of the period, Eugenie and Peter were cared for partly by household staff. Their English governess, Violet Croisdale, known as "Croisy", played an important role in their upbringing, although Eugenie's later relationship with her became difficult.

=== Education and intellectual influences ===
Eugenie and her brother received a relatively liberal education under their mother's supervision. They were initially taught by the Swiss tutor Henri Hoesli and subsequently attended public schools, an unusual choice for children of their social position. Their father, a devout member of the Church of Greece, personally oversaw their religious education.

The children grew up in a cultured environment and encountered a variety of writers, politicians and intellectuals. Eugenie met the author Rudyard Kipling when she was two years old. In 1924, she spent time with the French sinologist George Soulié de Morant, who taught her some Mandarin Chinese. Through her mother, she also came into contact with French statesman Aristide Briand, who was her mother's lover for a period, and the psychoanalyst Rudolph Loewenstein.

Marie Bonaparte's interest in psychoanalysis would become particularly important in Eugenie's adolescence. Marie had become a close associate of Sigmund Freud, and the family increasingly participated in the intellectual world surrounding the development of psychoanalysis in France and Austria.

== Illness and interwar years ==
=== Illness and psychoanalysis ===
The death of Eugenie's maternal grandfather, Roland Bonaparte, in 1924 marked the beginning of a difficult period for the family. In 1925, Marie Bonaparte left France for several months to undergo psychoanalysis with Sigmund Freud in Vienna. Eugenie felt abandoned by her mother's absence, particularly as her relationship with her father was also becoming more distant. She hoped to accompany her mother on a subsequent visit to Austria, but Prince George refused to allow her to leave France.

In July 1926, Eugenie and Peter finally met Freud and members of his family. The meeting pleased the children, although they continued to resent their mother's prolonged absences.

In November 1926, during Marie's fifth visit to Freud, Eugenie's health deteriorated suddenly. Her physician, Charles Talamon, initially considered jaundice but eventually diagnosed pleurisy. Marie immediately returned to Paris to care for her daughter. Eugenie was treated in France before being sent to a convalescent home in Leysin, Switzerland, during the summer of 1927. Her governess, Violet Croisdale, accompanied her, and Marie visited regularly.

As Eugenie's condition failed to improve, Marie moved her to a house in Leysin known as La Pyrole. The household included a cook, kitchen maid, chambermaid and chauffeur to help care for the sick princess. Eugenie was confined to bed for extended periods and occupied herself by reading, particularly the novels of Charles Dickens. With her parents' permission, she adopted two chow-chows, a breed that subsequently became closely associated with the family. Marie later devoted a book to one of the dogs, Topsy.

Marie and Eugenie grew closer during these years, and Marie came to regard her daughter as one of the few people who truly understood her. Eugenie nevertheless continued to feel that her mother did not take sufficient interest in her. Her illness required repeated examinations and treatments, and her health remained fragile for several years.

Despite her condition, Eugenie retained a lively and playful temperament. She made occasional trips with her mother, returning to Austria in August 1929 to see the Freud family and attend the Salzburg Festival. She spent time at the family's residence, Lys de Mer, in Saint-Tropez in March 1930, and returned to Vienna in February 1931. In March 1932, she attended Briand's funeral in Paris. In December that year, she travelled to Denmark for her parents' silver wedding anniversary, but her health deteriorated and she required emergency hospitalisation. It was not until October 1933 that she began to resume a more normal life.

During her illness, Eugenie became increasingly interested in psychoanalysis. She underwent therapy and eventually broke off her relationship with Croisdale in 1932, accusing her governess of being oppressive. Eugenie also corresponded with Freud and became sufficiently close to his circle to receive a ring bearing an intaglio, a symbol of esteem among his associates.

=== Travels in Europe and the Amazon ===
By 1934, Eugenie had recovered sufficiently to resume travelling and attending social events. That year, she served as a bridesmaid at the wedding in London of her cousin Prince George, Duke of Kent, and Princess Marina of Greece and Denmark.

In 1935, her cousin George II of Greece was restored to the Greek throne after twelve years of exile. Before returning to Athens, he invited members of the Greek royal family to London. Eugenie travelled there in October with her parents and Peter. At this time, her relationship with her brother became more complicated. Although they had long been close, Peter's relationship with Irina Ovtchinnikova, a divorced Russian woman whom he met in 1935, led him to distance himself from some members of his family. This contributed to a temporary estrangement between Peter, Eugenie and their mother.

After the London visit, Eugenie spent the end of 1935 with her mother at Lys de Mer in Saint-Tropez. In August 1936, the two travelled to Brazil, arriving in Belém on 22 August. They embarked on a cruise along the Amazon River to Manaus. Eugenie was fascinated by the region's natural environment and particularly enjoyed seeing parrots. The journey also marked one of her first romantic experiences, as she reportedly had a flirtation with a fellow traveller aboard the ship.

After completing their journey, Eugenie and Marie travelled to Madeira and Lisbon, returning to Paris on 20 September 1936.

In November, Eugenie and her family travelled to Greece for ceremonies marking the return of the remains of Constantine I of Greece, Queen Olga, and Queen Sophia, all of whom had died in exile. It was the first time Eugenie and Peter had returned to Greece since the Balkan Wars. Eugenie visited Crete with her family in April 1937 and attended the coronation of George VI in London the following month.

In autumn 1937, Eugenie returned to Vienna to continue her therapy with Freud. She remained there until Christmas. Freud was pleased with her progress and reportedly remarked that she had an understanding of the nature of psychoanalysis.

== Marriage and children ==
Eugenie became engaged to Prince Dominik Rainer Radziwiłł, a member of the Polish princely Radziwiłł family, on 18 February 1938. Her father, who had sometimes been distant towards her, was pleased by her choice of a husband from a family of comparable social standing and became warmer towards her following the engagement.

The engagement coincided with growing political danger in Europe. On 11 March 1938, Nazi Germany annexed Austria in the Anschluss. Marie Bonaparte was alarmed for Freud and his family and travelled to Vienna to help arrange their escape to the United Kingdom. Freud eventually reached London in June 1938.

Eugenie and Dominik married on 30 May 1938 at the Church of Saint-Louis-des-Invalides in Paris. The ceremony was attended by relatives and friends, including Prince Valdemar of Denmark and Eugenie's former governess, Violet Croisdale. Freud did not attend the wedding but visited the young couple's family in Paris shortly after escaping Austria.

The couple honeymooned in the United States, travelling aboard the French ocean liner Île-de-France. After returning to Europe, they stayed with Marie Bonaparte at Lys de Mer in September 1938. Eugenie translated into English her mother's book about Topsy, the family's chow-chow, which had developed cancer.

The couple subsequently settled in Normandy. Marie bought them a property, Val-Saint-Martin, near Beaumont-le-Roger. Eugenie's first pregnancy was difficult, and she spent a lengthy period confined to bed. Their daughter, Tatiana Radziwiłł, was born at the Saint-Hilaire clinic in Rouen on 28 August 1939.

== World War II ==
A few days after Tatiana's birth, Nazi Germany invaded Poland, beginning the Second World War in Europe. Dominik joined the Polish Legion stationed at Coëtquidan, in Brittany, in late September 1939, hoping to help his country. Eugenie remained at Val-Saint-Martin with their daughter.

Following the French defeat in the summer of 1940, Dominik was demobilised. The couple initially remained in Normandy before fleeing south to Saint-Tropez, where they took refuge at Lys de Mer in June 1940.

After the Armistice of 22 June 1940 and the establishment of the Vichy regime, Eugenie and Dominik decided to leave France. They travelled first to Egypt, then to Lourenço Marques in Portuguese Mozambique, now Maputo, before moving to Durban in the Union of South Africa. On 8 July 1941, Eugenie's parents and other members of the Greek royal family joined them in South Africa, having been forced into exile by the Axis occupation of Greece.

The exiled family subsequently established themselves in Cape Town. During their stay in South Africa, Eugenie and her cousin Princess Katherine of Greece and Denmark worked as nurses at St Dunstan's hospital. Eugenie's second pregnancy interrupted her nursing work. She spent six months confined to bed and was hospitalised in early October 1942. Her son was born the following month and was named George, or Jerzy in Polish.

Despite the birth of their son, Eugenie's marriage to Dominik continued to deteriorate. The couple separated after the war and their divorce was finalised on 27 February 1946.

== Second marriage and family life ==
=== Divorce and travels ===
Eugenie returned to Europe with her children in the summer of 1945 and settled at Lys de Mer, her mother's residence in Saint-Tropez. Dominik joined them there for a time, and the couple confirmed their decision to divorce. While the divorce proceedings were pending, Eugenie travelled to London with her children. On 31 December 1945, she and the children left for a trip to North America organised by Marie Bonaparte. After a short visit to Canada, they arrived in New York City on 16 January 1946 and remained in the United States until early March, when they returned to France.

In 1947, Eugenie travelled with her children and parents. She was in Corsica when her cousin, George II of Greece, died in Athens and was unable to attend his funeral. A few weeks later, she travelled to Denmark for the funeral of Christian X of Denmark. At the end of the year, she attended the wedding of Princess Elizabeth and Philip Mountbatten, later Duke of Edinburgh. Philip, born Prince Philip of Greece and Denmark, had spent four years of his childhood living with his family in Saint-Cloud.

=== Remarriage and family life ===
After her divorce from Dominik, Eugenie gradually considered remarrying. In March 1949, she informed her parents that she wished to marry Prince Raimundo della Torre e Tasso, Duke of Castel Duino. Raimundo was Catholic, while Eugenie was not particularly religious. Her parents approved of the match, and she applied to the Vatican for recognition of the nullity of her first marriage. The process was delayed, however, and the couple decided to marry according to the Orthodox rite while the matter remained unresolved.

The wedding took place on 28 June 1949 in the chapel of the royal palace in Athens. The ceremony was officiated by Archbishop Spyridon I of Athens and attended by members of European royal and princely families. The nullity of Eugenie's first marriage was recognised by the Catholic Church in 1952.

After the wedding, Eugenie and Raimundo spent two months honeymooning, beginning in Turkey. They then settled at Château de Malbosc in Grasse, France. Their son, Carlo Alessandro della Torre e Tasso, was born on 10 February 1952, Eugenie's forty-second birthday.

Eugenie was an attentive mother and was particularly concerned about the health of her elder son, Jerzy. She sought to provide her children with a modern education while also introducing them to the world of European royal families. Tatiana and Jerzy initially attended school together in Grasse, but their education later diverged. Tatiana attended a public secondary school, while Jerzy studied at École des Roches in Normandy before attending a boarding school in Villars-sur-Ollon, Switzerland.

=== Travels and family bereavements ===
Eugenie and her family continued to travel during the 1950s. In 1951, they visited Italy and Greece aboard the Orient Express. In 1953, they attended the coronation of Elizabeth II in London. In 1954, they participated in the first Cruise of the Kings, a Mediterranean cruise organised by Queen Frederica of Greece.

In November 1957, Eugenie cared for her father during his final illness. Prince George died that month, and she attended funeral ceremonies in Paris and at Tatoi Palace in Greece.

Eugenie remained close to her mother and supported her activities. In late 1959, she and Raimundo signed Marie Bonaparte's petition seeking an appeal against the death sentence imposed on American prisoner Caryl Chessman. The campaign was unsuccessful.

In April 1960, Eugenie and Tatiana accompanied Marie on a journey through Asia. They visited Ceylon, Thailand, Cambodia, Hong Kong, and Japan. In Japan, the group separated: Eugenie and Tatiana returned to France through India, while Marie continued to the United States before returning to Europe.

Marie Bonaparte died in Saint-Tropez in 1962, with Eugenie and her grandchildren at her side. Eugenie's second marriage ended in divorce in May 1965.

== Publications and historical research ==
=== Biography of Pierre-Napoléon Bonaparte ===
Following her mother's death in 1962, Eugenie devoted considerable time to sorting and cataloguing the family's papers. She had inherited access to extensive family archives and became an important source of information for researchers interested in the Bonaparte family and its connections with the European royal houses.

After several years of research, she published a biography of her maternal great-grandfather, Pierre-Napoléon Bonaparte, in 1963. Pierre-Napoléon was a son of Lucien Bonaparte and a nephew of Napoleon I. He was also known for killing the journalist Victor Noir in 1870, an event that became a major political scandal during the final years of the Second French Empire. Eugenie's biography examined his life and the controversy surrounding the killing.

The book received favourable critical attention and earned Eugenie the Prix Broquette-Gonin of the Académie française in 1964.

=== Research on Tsarevich Alexei ===
While sorting the papers in her family's house in Saint-Cloud, Eugenie discovered a small notebook in an old tin box. It contained pages from the diary of Alexei Nikolaevich, Tsarevich of Russia, alongside letters and photographs associated with the Russian imperial family during its imprisonment in Tobolsk after the Russian Revolution. The documents provided material for further research into Alexei's life and the final months of the imperial family.

Eugenie undertook extensive research into the documents and the circumstances surrounding Alexei's captivity. Her resulting biography, Le Tsarévitch, enfant martyr, was published posthumously in 1990. The book included the diary material and correspondence that had prompted her investigation.

Eugenie also assisted other researchers. She gave the writer Célia Bertin access to the family archives over a period of years, enabling Bertin to research her biography of Marie Bonaparte, first published in 1982. The work was subsequently reissued in 1999.

== Later life and death ==
After her second divorce in 1965, Eugenie established her principal residence at the Domaine des Marronniers in Saint-Cloud. During the 1970s, she moved to a spacious apartment in the Résidence Marie-Bonaparte, built on the grounds of her mother's former residence. She continued to visit Saint-Tropez, where her son Carlo Alessandro later settled, and maintained regular contact with the Greek royal family.

In 1964, Eugenie and her neighbour Anne Troisier de Diaz founded the Association pour la protection des sites naturels et historiques de la Moutte, des Salins et des Canebiers, an organisation dedicated to preserving the coastline and historic sites around Saint-Tropez.

Eugenie also continued to visit Athens and maintained warm relations with members of the Greek royal family. Her relationship with her brother Peter remained close despite their differences over Queen Frederica. Peter was a fierce critic of Frederica, but Eugenie continued to enjoy cordial relations with the Greek sovereigns and their family.

In old age, Eugenie developed Alzheimer's disease and gradually withdrew from public life. She died in Geneva, Switzerland, on 13 February 1989, three days after her seventy-ninth birthday. By the time of her death, she had known her five grandchildren.

Despite her divorce from Raimundo, Eugenie was buried beside him at Duino Castle, near Trieste, in Italy. Among those who attended her funeral was Queen Sofía of Spain.

== Issue ==
Eugenie had three children from her two marriages.

With Prince Dominik Radziwiłł, she had:

- Tatiana Radziwiłł (28 August 1939 – 19 December 2025), who married Dr Jean Henri Fruchaud. She was a bridesmaid at the 1962 wedding of Prince Juan Carlos of Spain and Princess Sophia of Greece and Denmark, and at the 1964 wedding of Constantine II of Greece and Princess Anne-Marie of Denmark.
- Prince Jerzy (George) Andrzej Dominik Hieronim Piotr Leon Radziwiłł (4 November 1942 – 27 August 2001).

With Prince Raimundo della Torre e Tasso, Duke of Castel Duino, she had:

- Prince Carlo Alessandro della Torre e Tasso, Duke of Castel Duino (born 10 February 1952), who married Véronique Lanz and had children.

== Honours ==
- Dame Grand Cross of the Order of Saints Olga and Sophia

== Ancestry ==
Ancestors of Princess Eugénie of Greece and Denmark

8. Christian IX of Denmark
4. George I of Greece
9. Princess Louise of Hesse-Kassel
2. Prince George of Greece and Denmark
10. Grand Duke Konstantin Nikolayevich of Russia
5. Grand Duchess Olga Constantinovna of Russia
11. Princess Alexandra of Saxe-Altenburg
1. Princess Eugénie of Greece and Denmark
12. Prince Pierre-Napoléon Bonaparte
6. Prince Roland Bonaparte
13. Éléonore-Justine Ruflin
3. Princess Marie Bonaparte
14. François Blanc
7. Marie-Félix Blanc
15. Marie Hensel

== Bibliography ==
- Bertin, Célia (1999). Marie Bonaparte. Paris: Perrin.
- Branda, Pierre (2018). "Marie, la névrosée". In La Saga des Bonaparte, du XVIIIe siècle à nos jours. Paris: Perrin.
- Eugénie de Grèce (1963). Pierre-Napoléon Bonaparte. Paris: Hachette.
- Eugénie de Grèce (1990). Le Tsarévitch, enfant martyr. Paris: Perrin.
- Mateos Sáinz de Medrano, Ricardo (2004). "La familia del príncipe Jorge: una psicoanalista en la familia y un amor entre dos hombres". In La Familia de la Reina Sofía: La Dinastía griega, la Casa de Hannover y los reales primos de Europa. Madrid: La Esfera de los Libros.
- Van der Kiste, John (1994). Kings of the Hellenes: The Greek Kings, 1863–1974. Stroud: Alan Sutton.
