= Loučeň =

- Market town
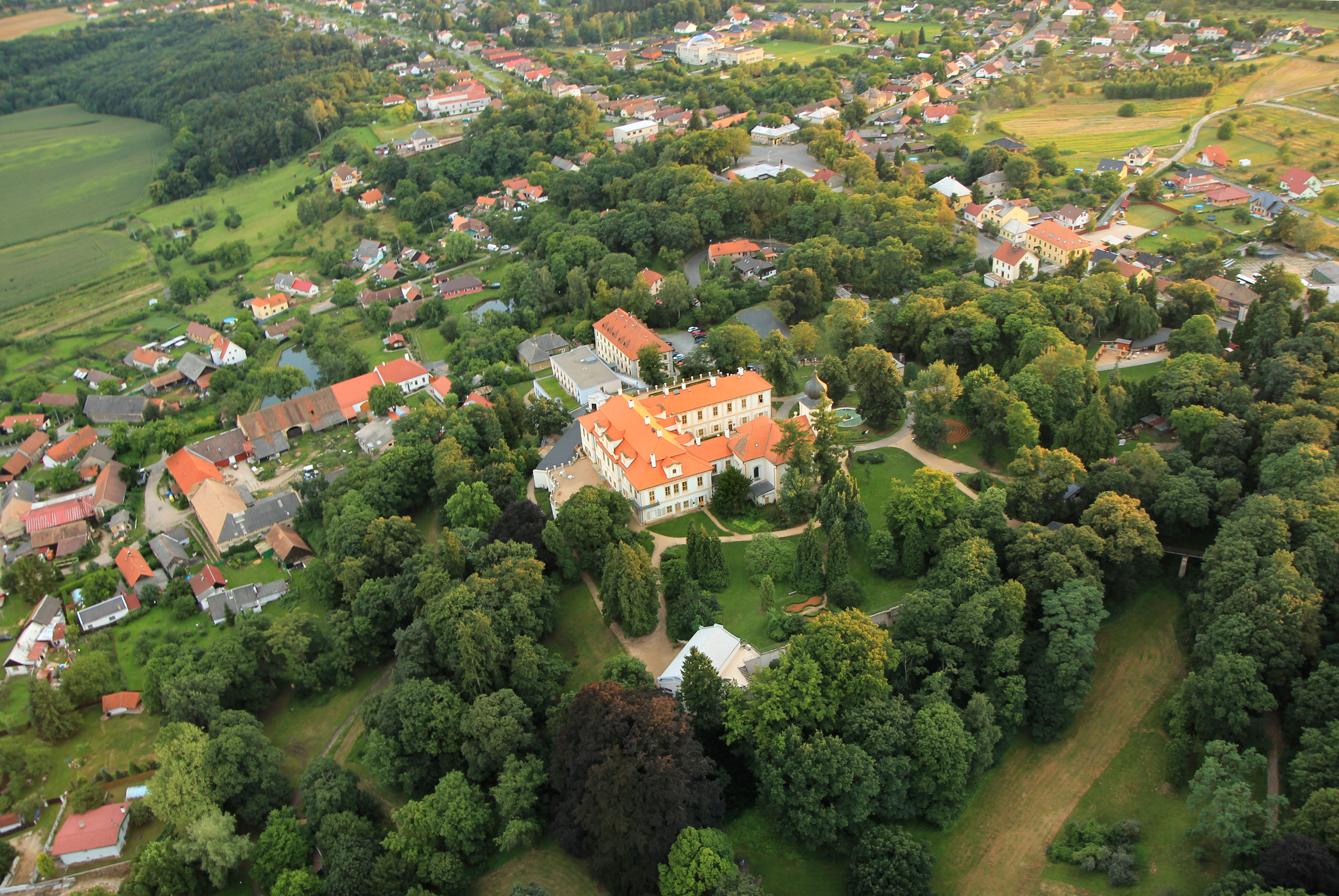
- Aerial view of Loučeň with Loučeň Castle

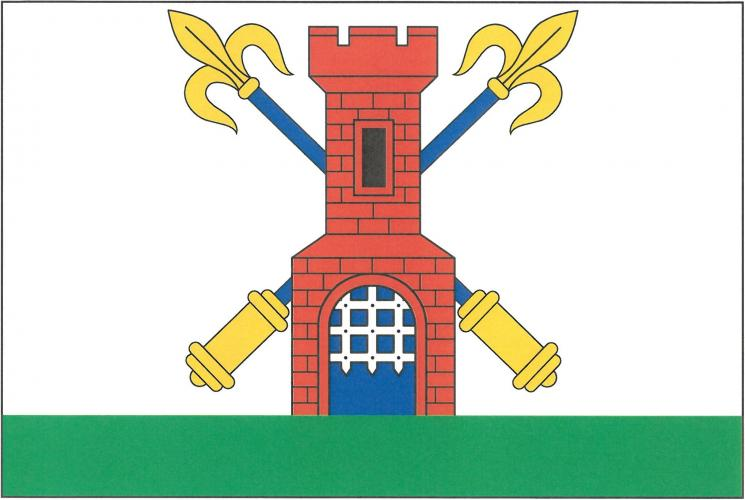
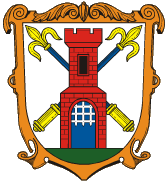
- Flag Coat of arms

- Location in the Czech Republic
- Coordinates: 50°17′8″N 15°1′14″E
- Country: Czech Republic
- Region: Central Bohemian
- District: Nymburk
- First mentioned: 1223

Area
  - Total: 19.03 km^{2} (7.35 sq mi)
- Elevation: 195 m (640 ft)

Population (2026-01-01)
  - Total: 1,422
  - Density: 74.72/km^{2} (193.5/sq mi)
- Time zone: UTC+1 (CET)
  - Summer (DST): UTC+2 (CEST)
- Postal code: 289 37
- Website: www.loucen.cz

Loučeň (Czech pronunciation: [ˈloutʃɛɲ]) is a market town in Nymburk District in the Central Bohemian Region of the Czech Republic. It has about 1,400 inhabitants.

== Administrative division ==
Loučeň consists of four municipal parts (in brackets population according to the 2021 census):

- Loučeň (860)
- Patřín (431)
- Studce (81)
- Studečky (16)

== Etymology ==
The name is derived from the personal name Loučen (in old Czech written as Lúčen; probably a variant of the name Lukáš), meaning "Loučen's (court)".

== Geography ==
Loučeň is located about 11 kilometres (7 mi) north of Nymburk and 37 km (23 mi) northeast of Prague. It lies on the border of the Jizera Table and Central Elbe Table. The highest point is at 262 m (860 ft) above sea level. There are several small fishponds around the market town.

== History ==
The first written mention of Loučeň is in a deed of Bishop Peregrin from 1223. Until 1363, the village was divided into several parts with different owners. In 1363, all the parts were bought by the Barons of Kopidlno. It is not known how long this family held Loučeň. At the beginning of the 16th century, the village was a property of the Křinecký of Ronov family.

After 1599, the estate was bought by the Berka of Dubá family. Their properties were confiscated after the Battle of White Mountain and Loučeň was acquired by the Waldstein family in 1622. During the Thirty Years' War, in 1630 and 1639, the village was burned down. From 1756 to 1808, Loučeň was held by the Fürstenberg family, and then the estate was inherited by the Thurn und Taxis family, who were the last noble owners of Loučeň. In 1906, Loučeň was promoted to a market town.

== Demographics ==
Historical population

Year	Pop.	±%
1869	1,547	—
1880	1,685	+8.9%
1890	1,608	−4.6%
1900	1,642	+2.1%
1910	1,584	−3.5%

Year	Pop.	±%
1921	1,497	−5.5%
1930	1,407	−6.0%
1950	1,302	−7.5%
1961	1,267	−2.7%
1970	1,123	−11.4%

Year	Pop.	±%
1980	1,179	+5.0%
1991	1,052	−10.8%
2001	1,081	+2.8%
2011	1,236	+14.3%
2021	1,388	+12.3%

Source: Censuses

== Transport ==
There are no railways or major roads passing through the municipality.

== Sights ==
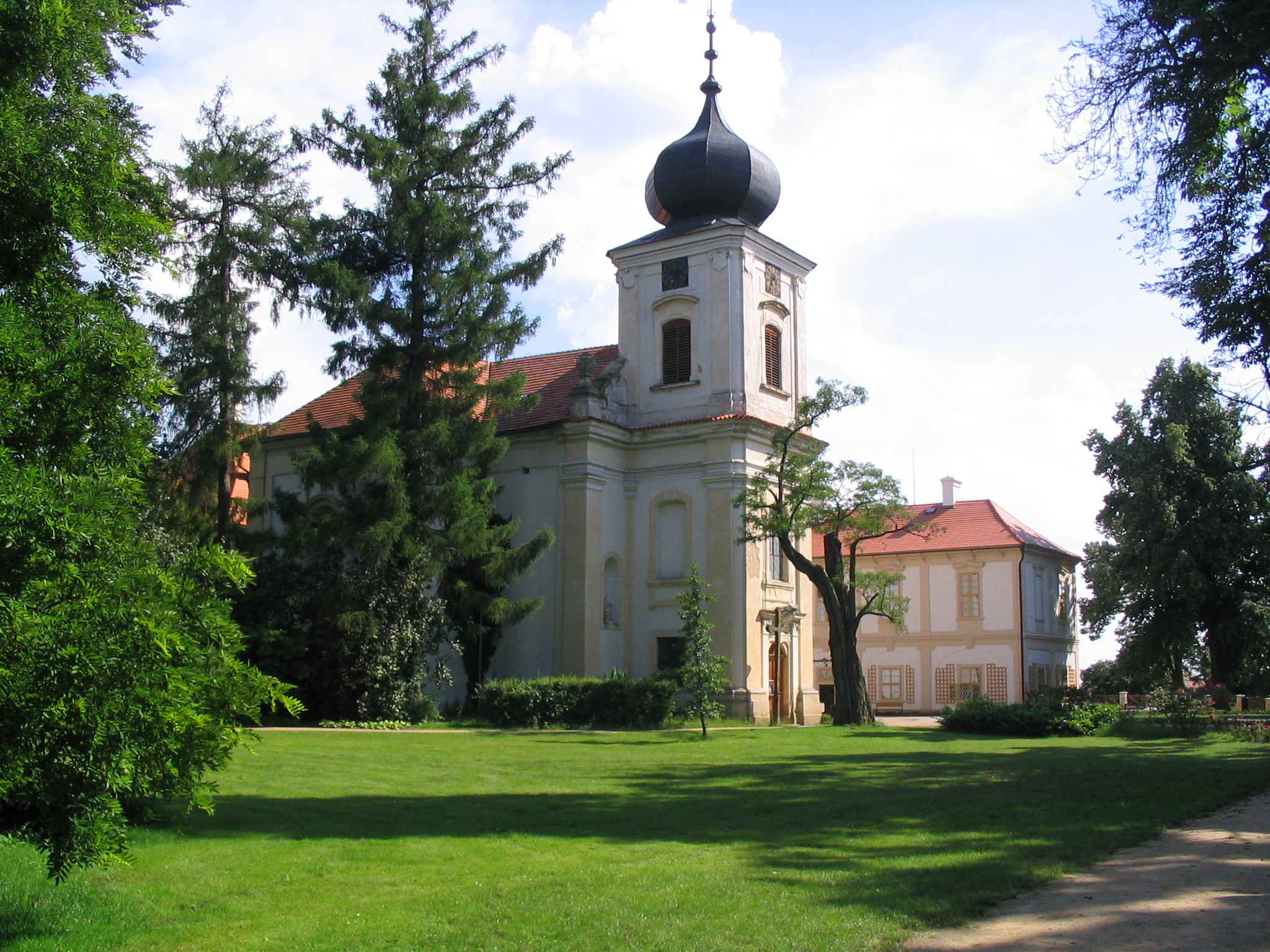
Church of the Assumption of the Virgin Mary

Loučeň is known for the Loučeň Castle. The Baroque castle was built on the site of a dilapidated medieval fortress in 1703–1714. Today it is open to the public and partially serves as a hotel. The castle also includes a large castle park with a set of labyrinths.

Next to the castle a chapel was built, later rebuilt into the Church of the Assumption of the Virgin Mary.
