= Carlo Alessandro, 3rd Duke of Castel Duino =

Prince Carlo Alessandro

Duke of Castel Duino
- Period: 17 March 1986 – present
- Predecessor: Raimundo
- Heir-Apparent: Prince Dimitri
- Born: 10 February 1952 (age 74); Neuilly-sur-Seine, Île-de-France, France
- Spouse: Veronique Lantz (m. 1976)
- Issue: Prince Dimitri; Prince Maximilian; Princess Constanza
Names
- Italian: Carlo Alessandro
- House: Thurn and Taxis
- Father: Raimundo, 2nd Duke of Castel Duino
- Mother: Princess Eugénie of Greece and Denmark

Prince Carlo Alessandro della Torre e Tasso, 3rd Duke of Castel Duino (born 10 February 1952) is the current head of the Castel Duino branch of the House of Thurn and Taxis.

== Family ==
Carlo Alessandro is the only child of Raimundo, 2nd Duke of Castel Duino and his wife Princess Eugénie of Greece and Denmark. He was born in Neuilly-sur-Seine, Île-de-France, France.

He is a maternal second cousin of Charles III, King of the United Kingdom, through their shared great-grandparents, King George I and Queen Olga of Greece, born a Grand Duchess of Russia.

== Marriage and issue ==
Carlo Alessandro married Véronique Lantz, daughter of Gérard Lantz and Monique Rachet, on 10 February 1976 in Saint-Tropez, Provence-Alpes-Côte d'Azur, France. They have three children:

- Prince Dimitri della Torre e Tasso (born 24 November 1977) m. 2017 Jonkvrouw Elinor de Pret Roose de Calesberg (b. 1981)
  - Prince Alexandre della Torre e Tasso (b. 2017)
  - Prince Louis della Torre e Tasso (b. 2019)
- Prince Maximilian della Torre e Tasso (born 22 May 1979)
- Princess Constanza della Torre e Tasso (born 7 August 1989)

Carlo Alessandro and his family currently reside at Duino Castle in the Province of Trieste, Italy.

Carlo Alessandro, 3rd Duke of Castel Duino House of Thurn and Taxis Cadet branch of the House of Tassis Born: 10 February 1952
Italian nobility
Preceded by Raimundo	Duke of Castel Duino; 17 March 1986 – present	Incumbent; Heir: Prince Dimitri
