= Mcely =

- Municipality
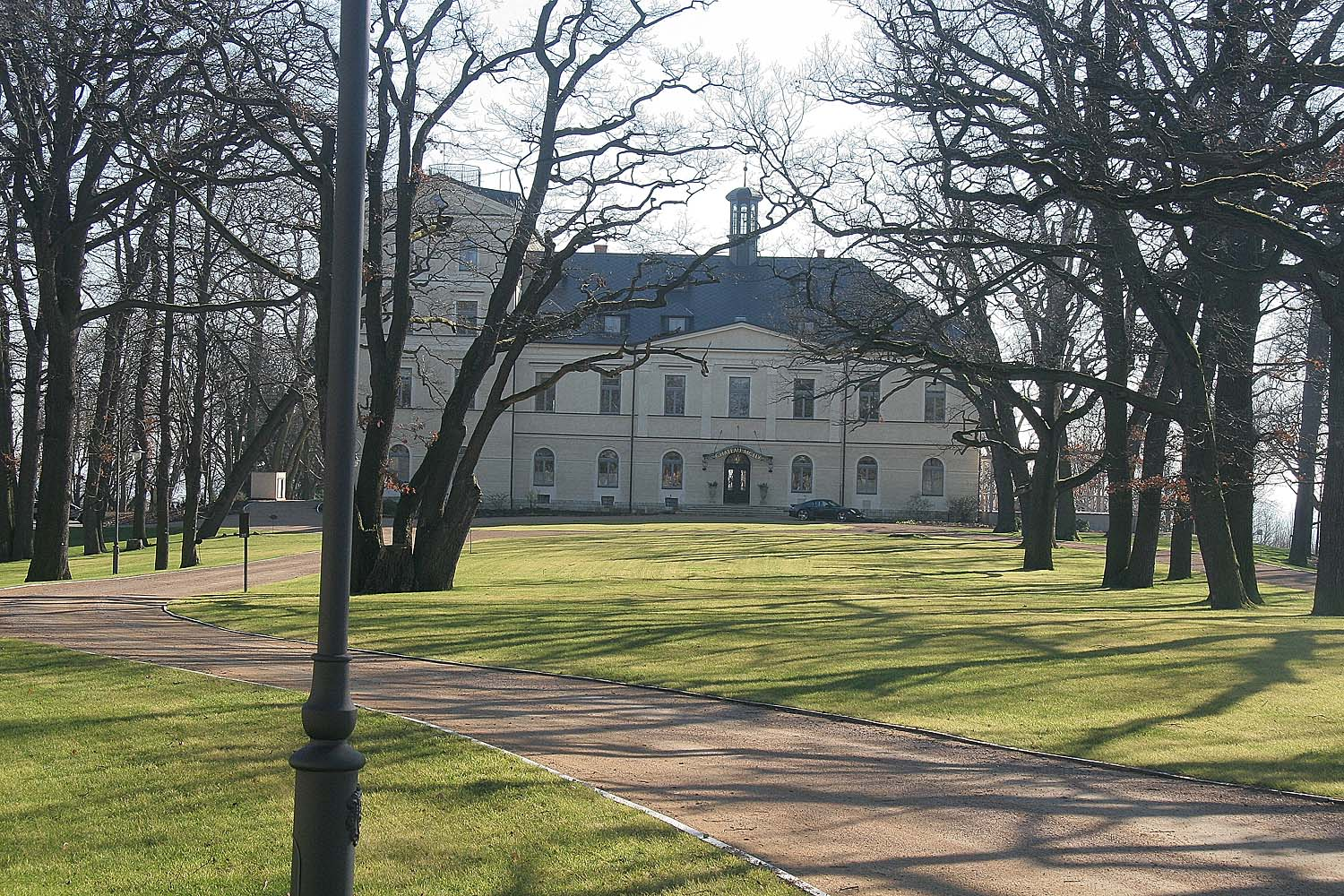
- Mcely Castle

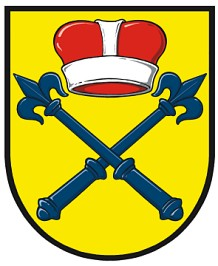
- Flag Coat of arms

- Location in the Czech Republic
- Coordinates: 50°13′29″N 14°47′57″E
- Country: Czech Republic
- Region: Central Bohemian
- District: Nymburk
- First mentioned: 1252

Area
  - Total: 13.38 km^{2} (5.17 sq mi)
- Elevation: 211 m (692 ft)

Population (2026-01-01)
  - Total: 423
  - Density: 31.6/km^{2} (81.9/sq mi)
- Time zone: UTC+1 (CET)
  - Summer (DST): UTC+2 (CEST)
- Postal code: 289 36
- Website: obecmcely.cz

Mcely is a municipality and village in Nymburk District in the Central Bohemian Region of the Czech Republic. It has about 400 inhabitants.

== Demographics ==
Historical population
| Year | Pop. | ±% |
|---|---|---|
| 1869 | 845 | — |
| 1880 | 933 | +10.4% |
| 1890 | 857 | −8.1% |
| 1900 | 745 | −13.1% |
| 1910 | 731 | −1.9% |
| 1921 | 840 | +14.9% |
| 1930 | 775 | −7.7% |
| 1950 | 569 | −26.6% |
| 1961 | 582 | +2.3% |
| 1970 | 506 | −13.1% |
| 1980 | 430 | −15.0% |
| 1991 | 420 | −2.3% |
| 2001 | 383 | −8.8% |
| 2011 | 378 | −1.3% |
| 2021 | 402 | +6.3% |
Source: Censuses

== Notable people ==
- Alessandro, 1st Duke of Castel Duino (1881–1937), nobleman
