= Thurn und Taxis family =

German noble family

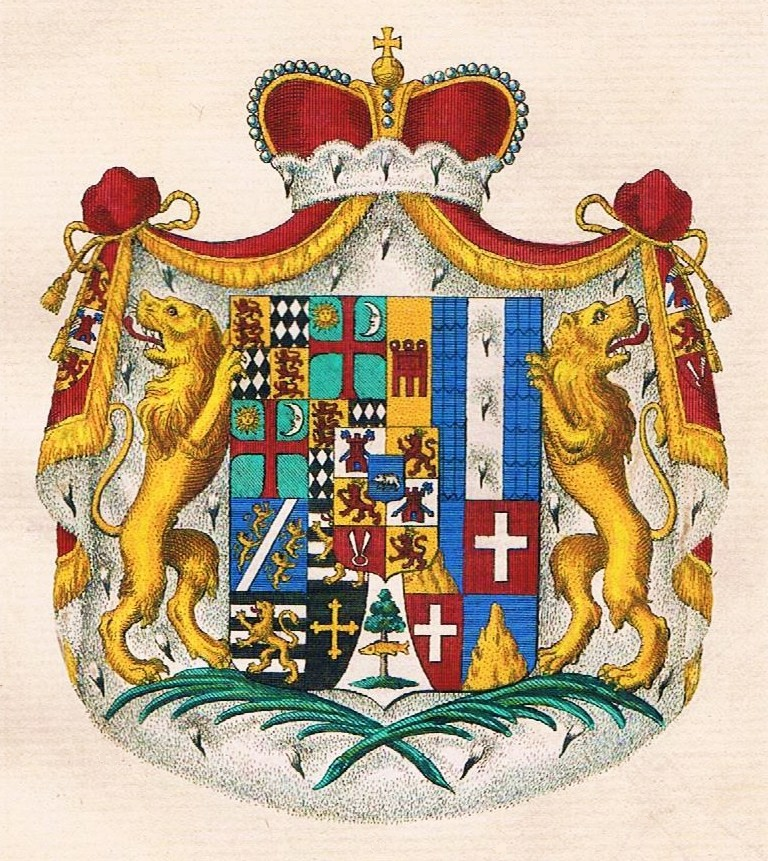
Princely Coat of Arms of the House of Thurn und Taxis

The Princely House of Thurn und Taxis, also Anglicised as Thurn and Taxis (German: Fürstenhaus von Thurn und Taxis, [ˈtuːɐ̯n ʔʊnt ˈtaksɪs], Italian: della Torre e Tasso, French: de la Tour et Tassis) is a German noble family that originated in Lombardy (Italy). It was a key player in the postal services in Europe; its operations began around 1290 in the Bergamo region, and from the 16th to the 19th century, it maintained significant, Europe-wide networks with headquarters in Brussels and Frankfurt.

From the 14th century onwards, it operated a relay courier service between numerous European capitals; from this, a private postal enterprise evolved starting in 1490, followed by the Kaiserliche Reichspost (Imperial Post) which was operated by the family from around 1600 to 1806, followed by the Thurn-und-Taxis Post between 1806 and 1867.

By investing the proceeds from its postal business − and later the compensations received for its postal rights – into numerous landed estates in Southern Germany during the 18th and 19th centuries, the family became, and remains to this day, Germany's largest private forest owner. It also operated a brewery and a private bank.

The family, raised to the rank of baron in 1608 and count in 1624, added Thurn to its original surname, Taxis, starting in 1650. In 1681, the Brussels branch was raised to the rank of prince in the Spanish Netherlands, and in 1695 to the rank of prince of the Holy Roman Empire. From 1615, the heads of the family held the title of Hereditary Postmaster General of the Holy Roman Empire. Admission to the Council of Princes of the Imperial Diet took place in 1704. The Imperial Diet was based in Regensburg. When the head of the family, Prince Alexander, assumed the office of the Emperor's representative (Principal Commissioner) at the Perpetual Diet – and thus the presidency of that parliament – in 1741, he relocated from Frankfurt to Regensburg. His descendants held this office until the end of the Empire in 1806. In 1812, the family acquired the buildings and lands of the significant former Imperial Saint Emmeram's Abbey there; since then, the site has remained their place of residence and business headquarters under the name St Emmeram's Palace. The current head of the House is Albert, 12th Prince of Thurn und Taxis.

They are one of the mediatised Houses for their former sovereign Imperial counties, acquired in the 18th century, which were consolidated into a principality in 1803 (Principality of Buchau), consisting of the lands of five secularized imperial abbeys, though it lost its political independence as early as 1806 when it was mediatised to the Kingdom of Württemberg, and in smaller parts to the Kingdom of Bavaria and the principality of Hohenzollern-Sigmaringen.

== History ==
The Tasso family (from the Italian word for "badger", the family's heraldic animal) was a Lombard family in the area of Bergamo. The earliest records place them in Almenno in the Val Brembana around 1200, before they fled to the more distant village of Cornello to escape feuding between Bergamo's Colleoni (Guelph) and Suardi (Ghibelline) families. Around 1290, after Milan had conquered Bergamo, Omodeo Tasso organized 32 of his relatives into the Company of Couriers (Compagnia dei Corrieri) and linked Milan with Venice and Rome. The recipient of royal and papal patronage, his post riders were so comparatively efficient that they became known as bergamaschi throughout Italy.

Ruggiero de Tassis was named to the court of the Emperor Frederick the Peaceful in 1443. He organized a post system between Bergamo and Vienna by 1450; from Innsbruck to Italy and Styria around 1460; and Vienna with Brussels around 1480. Upon his success, Ruggiero was knighted and made a gentleman of the Chamber. Janetto von Taxis was appointed Chief Master of Postal Services at Innsbruck in 1489. Philip of Burgundy elevated Janetto's brother Francesco I de Tassis to captain of his post in 1502. Owing to a payment dispute with Philip, Francisco opened his post to public use in 1506. In 1512 the family was ennobled by Emperor Maximilian I. By 1516, Francisco had moved the family to Brussels in the Duchy of Brabant, where they became instrumental to Habsburg rule, linking the rich Habsburg Netherlands to the Spanish court. The normal route passed through France, but a secondary route across the Alps to Genoa was available in times of hostility.

At the death of Francisco in 1517, Emperor Charles V appointed Francisco's nephew Johann Baptista von Taxis (1470-1541) as Generalpostmeister of the Kaiserliche Reichspost. Johann Baptista was briefly succeeded by his eldest son, Franz II von Taxis (1514-1543), after whose untimely death the family split into two further branches. The youngest son, Leonhard I von Taxis, succeeded as Generalpostmeister and is the ancestor of the princely Thurn und Taxis family. Johann Baptista's second-eldest son, Raymond de Tassis (1515-1579), took over the office of postmaster-general to the Crown of Spain and settled in Spain. Raymond married into Spanish nobility, and his eldest son Juan de Tassis was created Count of Villamediana in 1603 by Phillip III. The Spanish line of the family became extinct with Juan de Tassis, 2nd Count of Villamediana, a poet who died in mysterious circumstances in 1622. A sister of Johann Baptista, Elisabeth Taxis, and her husband Bonus of Bordogna, founded the Taxis-Bordogna-Valnigra family, whose descendants held the office of Lieutenant Postmaster General in the Trento and Alto Adige regions through a later baronial line, and that of Lieutenant Postmaster General in Bolzano through a comital line.

In 1608 the Brussels line was raised to the status of hereditary barons, and in 1642 the Innsbruck line as well (which descends from Gabriel de Tassis, d. 1529). When the Brussels line was raised to the hereditary status of counts in 1624, they needed illustrious lineage to legitimize their intended further ascension to the high nobility. Alexandrine von Taxis commissioned genealogists to "clarify" their origin, who until then had only been considered a family descending from medieval knights who had become merchants. They now claimed, albeit without documentary evidence, that they descended from the Italian noble family Della Torre, or Torriani, who had ruled in Milan and Lombardy until 1311. She then applied to the emperor for a name change. With the Germanization, the coat of arms symbol of the Milanese family, the tower (Torre), became Thurn (an older German spelling, nowadays Turm) and was placed in front of the actual family name Tasso, translated with Taxis (an older German spelling for Dachs = Badger). The tower of the Torriani was added to the badger as a coat of arms. They formally adopted the German form of their name in 1650, including the comital Innsbruck line, which also exists to this day.

In 1681 the Brussels line was elevated to the Spanish Netherlands' rank of prince with Eugen Alexander Franz, 1st Prince of Thurn und Taxis, with Braine-le-Château (acquired in 1670) as his titular principality (Principauté de la Tour et Tassis), and in 1695 to the rank of imperial prince at the behest of Emperor Leopold I, although at that time no territorial possessions existed in the Holy Roman Empire. Admission to the Imperial Council of Princes in the Imperial Diet took place in 1704. The new seat in Parliament was the first that was not linked to sovereign territorial lordship, but rested solely on the office of Postmaster General.

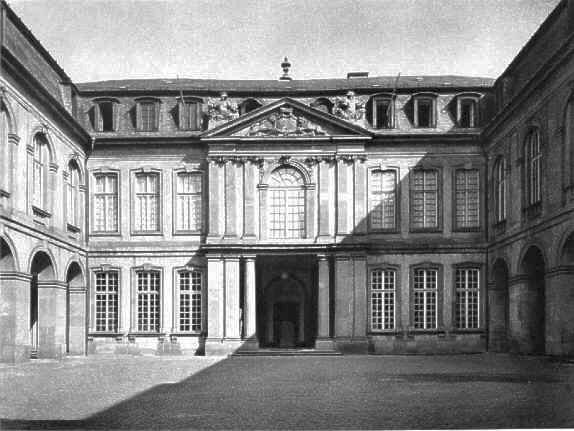
Palais Thurn und Taxis in Frankfurt

The Brussels line moved to Frankfurt in 1703 because of the War of the Spanish Succession; their new family seat built from 1731 was the Palais Thurn und Taxis. The first estates acquired within the Empire were Taxis Castle (Trugenhofen) in 1734 and Duttenstein Castle in 1735, followed by Ballmertshofen Castle in 1749 and the Bohemian estate of Luže in 1773. Emperor Charles VII appointed Alexander Ferdinand, 3rd Prince of Thurn and Taxis, Principal Commissioner (Lord Chancellor) of the Imperial Diet in 1743. He therefore moved to Regensburg, where the parliament was seated, in 1748. The position became hereditary in the family who lived in different houses there, but the company headquarters remained in Frankfurt. When Saint Emmeram's Abbey in Regensburg was secularized in 1803, the monastery buildings were donated to the princes of Thurn und Taxis, who had them converted into a residence, henceforth known as Schloss Thurn und Taxis, sometimes also called Saint Emmeram Palace. It has remained their family seat to this day.

In 1786, Karl Anselm, 4th Prince of Thurn and Taxis, acquired the Upper Swabian county of Friedberg with the lordships of Scheer, Dürmentingen and Bussen from the princes of Waldburg, which from 1787 was known as the County of Friedberg-Scheer. Only then did the Thurn und Taxis rule their own principality of the empire for 20 years, but their main source of income remained the Imperial Reichspost.

The family operated the Thurn-und-Taxis Post, successor to the Imperial Reichspost of the Holy Roman Empire, between 1806 and 1867. Their postal service was gradually lost over the centuries, with the Spanish network being bought by the crown in the 18th century and the German post being purchased by Prussia after the fall of the Free City of Frankfurt in 1866. By investing their earnings from the postal business - later also the settlements for the postal rights - in numerous landed estates, a large number of forests and farms as well as castles were added to the family property, especially from secularized church property, among them Buchau Abbey, Marchtal Abbey, Neresheim Abbey, Ennetach Abbey, Siessen Abbey, and others. In 1803 they were summarized as Imperial Principality of Buchau. The buildings of these monasteries were mostly re-donated to the church in the 20th century, and more than 30 castles and manor houses, serving as centers of local estates, have since been resold, but the lands continue to be cultivated by the princely administration. Besides the St Emmeram's Palace the current prince still owns Taxis Castle (Trugenhofen) and Garatshausen Castle at Feldafing on Lake Starnberg.

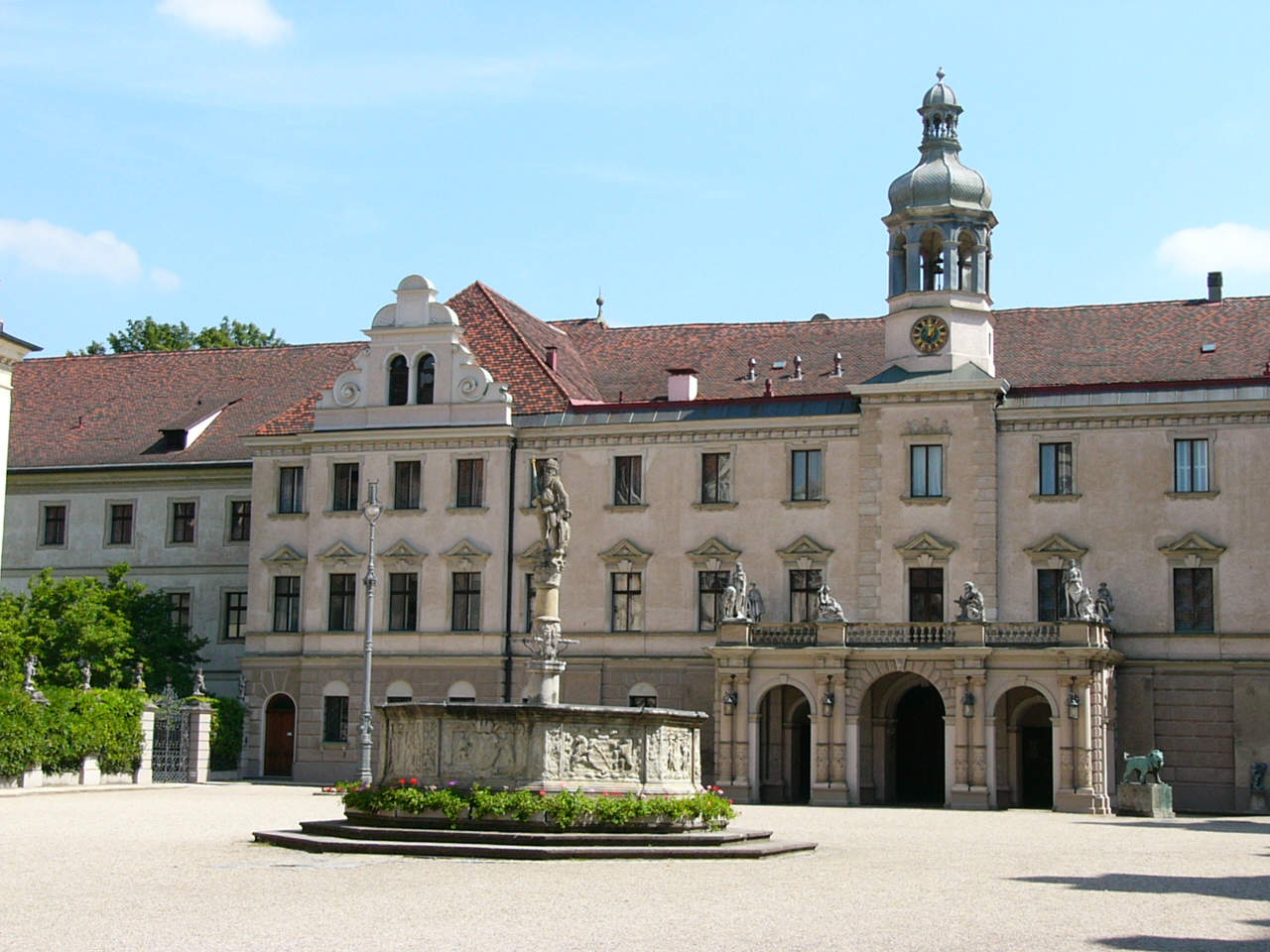
Small section of the extensive family seat at St Emmeram's Palace in Regensburg, Germany

A younger branch was formed with the Czech branch of the Thurn und Taxis family. The poet Rainer Maria Rilke wrote his Duino Elegies while visiting Princess Marie of Thurn und Taxis (née Princess of Hohenlohe, wife of Prince Alexander from the Bohemian branch at Loučeň) at her family's Duino Castle near Trieste. Rilke later dedicated his only novel (The Notebooks of Malte Laurids Brigge) to the princess, who was his patroness. Her son Prince Alexander (1881–1937) became an Italian citizen named Principe della Torre e Tasso and was raised in 1923 by the Italian king to Duke of Castel Duino. Today Duino Castle belongs to his grandson, Prince Carlo della Torre e Tasso, Duca di Castel Duino (b. 1952). The Duino branch is part of the family's Czech branch that in the early 19th century settled in Bohemia (now the Czech Republic).

Several members of the family have been Knights of Malta.

Until 1919, the titles of the head of the princely house were His Serene Highness the Fürst von Thurn und Taxis, Prince of Buchau and Prince of Krotoszyn, Duke of Wörth and Donaustauf, Princely Count of Friedberg-Scheer, Count of Valle-Sássina, Marchtal, Neresheim etc., Hereditary Postmaster General.

The current head of the Thurn und Taxis family is Albert II, 12th Prince of Thurn und Taxis, son of Johannes and his wife, Gloria. To this day, the family is among the largest landowners in Germany. Nevertheless, following Prince Johannes's death in 1990, his estate had to be consolidated due to heavy debts incurred from the acquisition of several international companies and the inheritance taxes that fell due. In 1992, the Fürst Thurn und Taxis Bank was sold to Schmidtbank which in turn was taken over by Commerzbank in 2004. The family's brewery was sold to the Paulaner Group of Munich in 1996, but it still produces beer under the brand of Thurn und Taxis. Princess Gloria, widowed at an early age and a prominent public figure, achieved a turnaround by selling companies, a large number of properties and works of art, and continues to manage the family's business interests to this day.

== Princes of Thurn und Taxis ==
- Eugen Alexander, 1st Prince 1695–1714 (1652–1714)
  - Anselm Franz, 2nd Prince 1714–1739 (1681–1739)
    - Alexander Ferdinand, 3rd Prince 1739–1773 (1704–1773)
      - Karl Anselm, 4th Prince 1773–1805 (1733–1805)
        - Karl Alexander, 5th Prince 1805–1827 (1770–1827)
          - Maximilian Karl, 6th Prince 1827–1871 (1802–1871)
            - Maximilian Anton, Hereditary Prince of Thurn and Taxis (1831–1867)
              - Maximilian Maria, 7th Prince 1871–1885 (1862–1885)
              - Albert I, 8th Prince 1885–1952 (1867–1952)
                - Franz Joseph, 9th Prince 1952–1971 (1893–1971)
                  - Prince Gabriel (1922–1942)
                - Karl August, 10th Prince 1971–1982 (1898–1982)
                  - Johannes Baptista, 11th Prince 1982–1990 (1926–1990)
                    - Albert II, 12th Prince 1990–present (born 1983)
                - Prince Raphael Rainer (1906–1993)
                  - Prince Max Emanuel (1935–2020), two sons without dynastic rights
                - Prince Philipp Ernst (1908–1964)
                  - Prince Albert Friedrich (1930–2021)
      - Prince Maximilian Joseph (1769–1831), founder of the Czech branch of the family
        - Prince Karl Anselm (1792–1844)
          - Prince Hugo Maximilian (1817–1889)
            - Prince Alexander Johann (1851–1939)
              - Prince Erich Lamoral (1876–1952)
                - Prince Johann von Nepomuk (1908–1959)
                  - (1) Prince Friedrich (born 1950), heir presumptive
                  - (2) Prince Karl Ferdinand (born 1952), three sons without dynastic rights
                  - (3) Prince Maximilian (born 1955)
              - Prince Alexander (1881–1937), 1st Principe della Torre e Tasso and Duke of Castel Duino 1923–1937 (some heirs are without dynastic rights)
                - Prince Raimundo
                  - Prince Carlo
                - Prince Luigi
                  - Prince Alessandro
                - Princess Margarete

The Thurn and Taxis family came to massive media attention during the late 1970s through mid-1980s when Prince Johannes married Countess Mariae Gloria of Schönburg-Glauchau, a member of an impoverished but mediatized noble family. The couple's wild, "jet set" lifestyle and Princess Gloria's over-the-top appearance (characterized by bright hair colours and avant-garde clothes) earned her the nickname of "Princess TNT".

== Popular culture ==
- The mail monopoly of Thurn und Taxis is central to the plot of The Crying of Lot 49 by Thomas Pynchon.
- The board game Thurn and Taxis, by Andreas Seyfarth and Karen Seyfarth, is inspired by the family.
- The protagonist of Walter Jon Williams's Elegy for Angels and Dogs is the head of the Thurn und Taxis family.
- Thurn und Taxis are also mentioned in several volumes of the 163x series by Eric Flint and others, e.g. 1635: The Dreeson Incident and 1636: The Saxon Uprising.
- The credits for Season 3, Episode 4 of the television show The Good Place features a character named "The Baroness von Thurn und Taxis," played by Ilka Urbach.

== See also ==
- Donaustauf Castle (Bavaria)
- Donaustauf Palace (Bavaria)
- Order of Parfaite Amitié
- Tour & Taxis (Brussels)

== Sources ==
- Wolfgang Behringer, Thurn und Taxis, Die Geschichte ihrer Post und ihrer Unternehmen, Munich, Zurich 1990 ISBN 3-492-03336-9
- Martin Dallmeier, Quellen zur Geschichte des europäischen Postwesens, Kallmünz 1977
- Martin Dallmeier and Martha Schad, Das Fürstliche Haus Thurn und Taxis, 300 Jahre Geschichte in Bildern, Regensburg 1996, ISBN 3-7917-1492-9
- Fritz Ohmann, Die Anfänge des Postwesens und die Taxis, Leipzig 1909
- Joseph Rübsam, Johann Baptista von Taxis, Freiburg im Breisgau 1889
- Mareček, Zdeněk, Loučeň a Thurn Taxisové. Pohledy do doby minulé i nedávné. Obec Loučeň, 1998.
