= Duino Castle =

Fort in Duino, Italy

Coordinates: 45°46′N 13°36′E

Duino castle

Duino Castle (Italian: Castello di Duino, German: Schloss Duino, Slovene: Devinski grad) is a fourteenth-century fortification located in the village of Duino, located in the municipality of Duino-Aurisina, near Trieste, modern-day Italy, on the cliffs overlooking the Gulf of Trieste.

Building commenced in 1389 at the order of the Wallsee family. The ruins of an older castle built in the eleventh century by the Patriarch of Aquileia are located on the grounds. In the nineteenth century, it became one of two residences for Prince Alexander von Thurn und Taxis and his wife Princess Marie of the Czech branch of the House of Thurn und Taxis. While not the wealthiest of the Thurn und Taxis line, Alexander and Marie supported artists and writers, including Bohemian-Austrian poet Rainer Maria Rilke. While a guest of Princess Marie in early 1912, Rilke began to write his Duino Elegies, a collection of ten long, deeply philosophical and mystical poems which are considered to be his greatest work. Rilke dedicated his work to Princess Marie when they were completed in February 1922 and published the following year.

Duino Castle remains property of the Thurn und Taxis family, and is owned by Prince Alexander and Princess Marie's great-grandson, Prince Carlo Alessandro della Torre e Tasso, Duke of Castel Duino.

Most of the castle and its grounds have been opened to the public as a museum and park, while parts of the castle have housed the United World College of the Adriatic since 1982.

== History ==
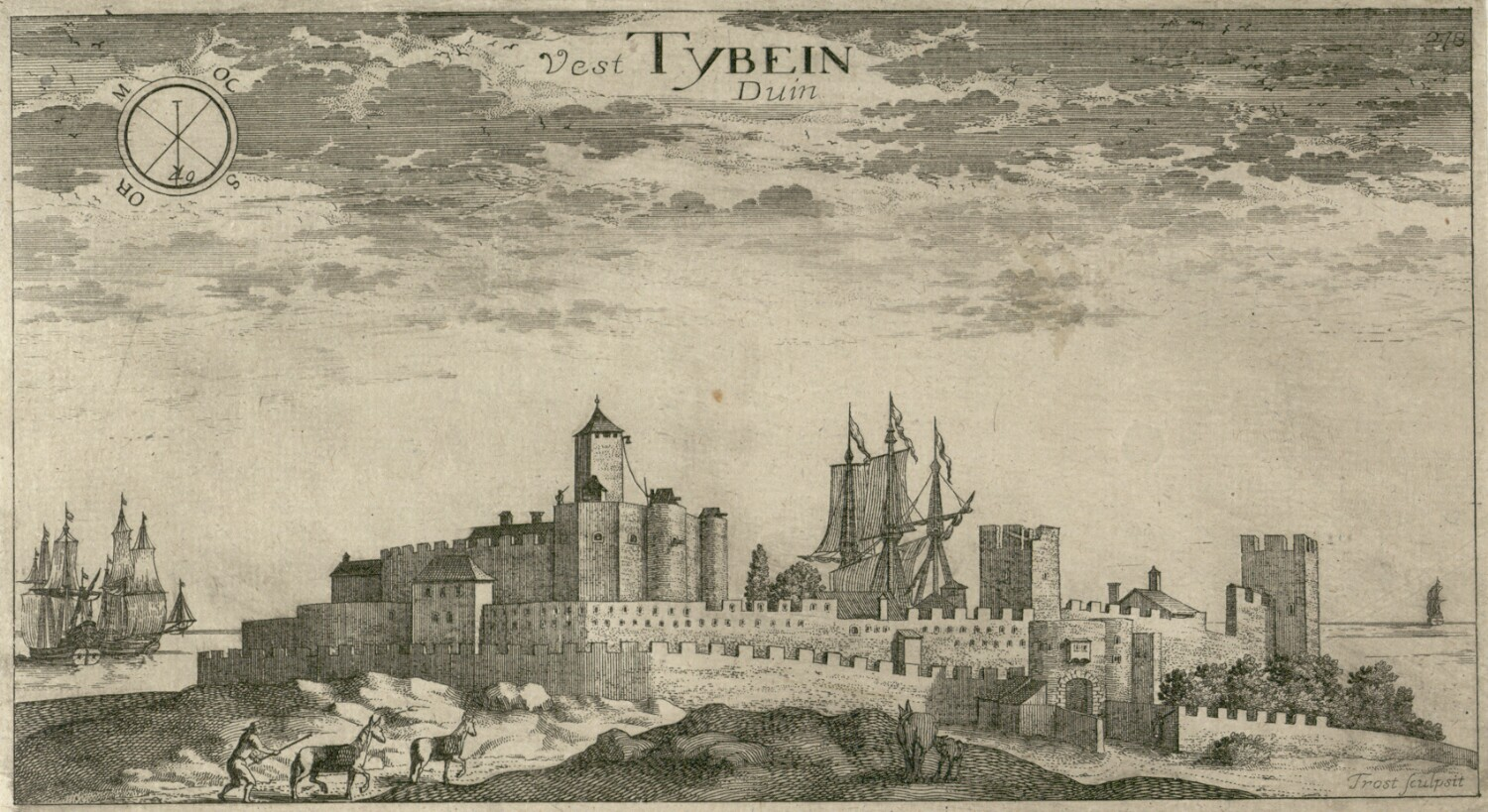
Duino castle in an engraving by Janez Vajkard Valvasor from 1679.

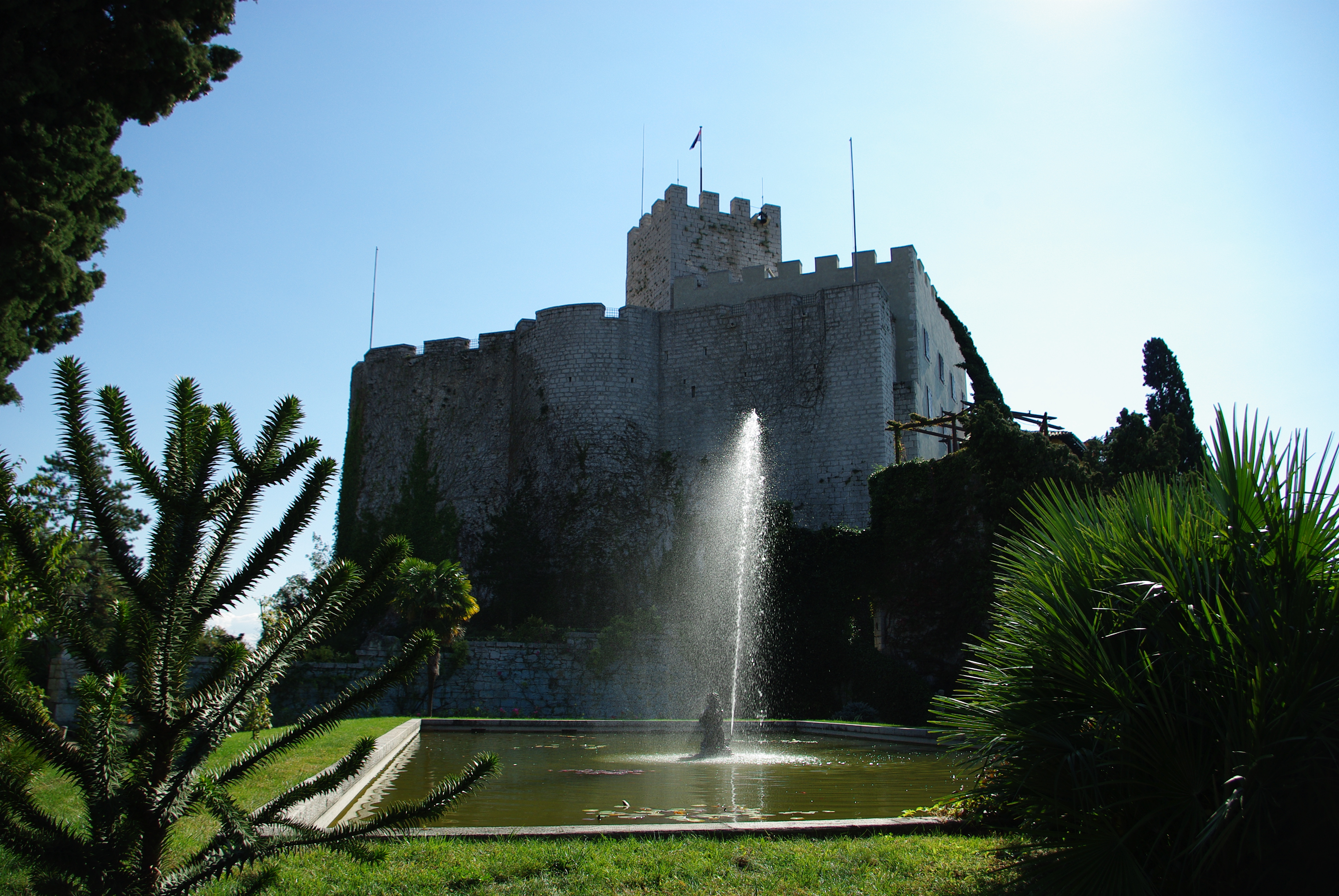
Duino Castle

=== Early history ===
Near the castle are the ruins of the Old Castle which dates back to the 11th century. It belonged to the patriarchy of Aquileia. The castle dates back to 1389, when the Wallsee family commanded the construction of a strong fortress. Over time, the Wallsee family disappeared and the castle, after having been used as a prison, became the residence of the Luogar and Hofer.

=== The House of Thurn und Taxis ===
At the end of the 19th century, it became the property of Prince Alexander Johann Vincenz Rudolf Hugo Karl Lamoral Eligius von Thurn und Taxis from the Czech branch of the House of Thurn and Taxis. It remains with the family to this day with his great-grandson Prince Carlo Alessandro della Torre e Tasso, Duke of Castel Duino, the current owner. The castle has been opened to the public as a museum and park.

At the end of and after World War II, the castle served as headquarters of the British XIII Corps (United Kingdom) under the command of Lt. Gen. Sir John Harding, 1st Baron Harding of Petherton. XIII Corps was part of the combined Allied Mediterranean Theater of Operations under Supreme Allied Commander Lt. Gen. Sir William Duthie Morgan.

=== Rilke and the Duino Elegies ===
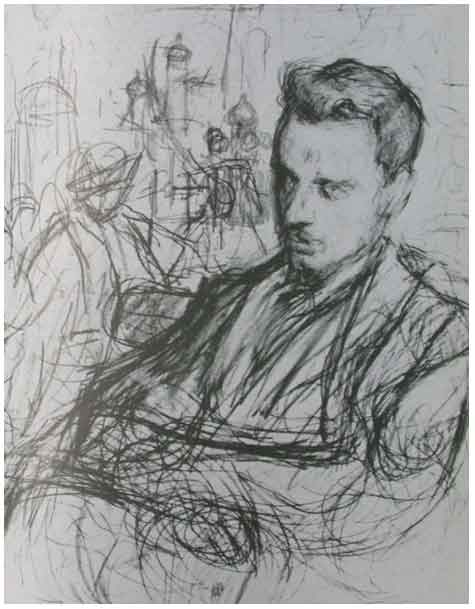
Rainer Maria Rilke (1875–1926) in a sketch by Leonid Pasternak

In 1912, Austrian-Bohemian writer and poet Rainer Maria Rilke (1875-1926) began to write portions of his famous work, Duino Elegies, while visiting Duino Castle as a guest of the Princess Marie von Thurn und Taxis (born Princess of Hohenlohe). While walking along the cliffs overlooking the Adriatic Sea near the castle, Rilke claimed to hear a voice calling to him speaking the words of the first line, Wer, wenn ich schriee, hörte mich denn aus der Engel Ordnungen? ("Who, if I cried out, would hear me among the hierarchies of angels?") which he quickly wrote in his notebook. Within days, he produced drafts of the first two elegies in the series (of ten) and drafted passages and fragments that would later be incorporated into later elegies—including the opening passage of the tenth elegy. The Duino Elegies are recognized by critics and scholars as his most important work and one of the chief transitional works between the apex of German Romanticism and Modernist poetry. They are ten intensely religious, mystical poems that weigh beauty and existential suffering. The poems employ a rich symbolism of angels and salvation, and are described as a metamorphosis of Rilke's "ontological torment" and an "impassioned monologue about coming to terms with human existence" discussing themes of "the limitations and insufficiency of the human condition and fractured human consciousness ... man's loneliness, the perfection of the angels, life and death, love and lovers, and the task of the poet".

Rilke finished the work in Switzerland after a ten-year period where depression and an existential crisis rendered him unable to continue writing. Upon publication in 1922, Rilke dedicated the work to the Princess, who he esteemed as one of his greatest patrons and closest friends.
