= Dusebach =

River in Germany

Location
- Country: Germany
- State: Hesse

Physical characteristics
- Mouth
  - location: Mühlenwasser
  - coordinates: 51.3355°N 9.1854°E
- Length: 10.4 km (6.5 mi)

Basin features
- Progression: Mühlenwasser→ Erpe→ Twiste→ Diemel→ Weser→ North Sea

Dusebach is a river of Hesse, Germany. It flows into the Mühlenwasser near Wolfhagen.

== See also ==
- List of rivers of Hesse
