= Limeckebach =

River in Germany

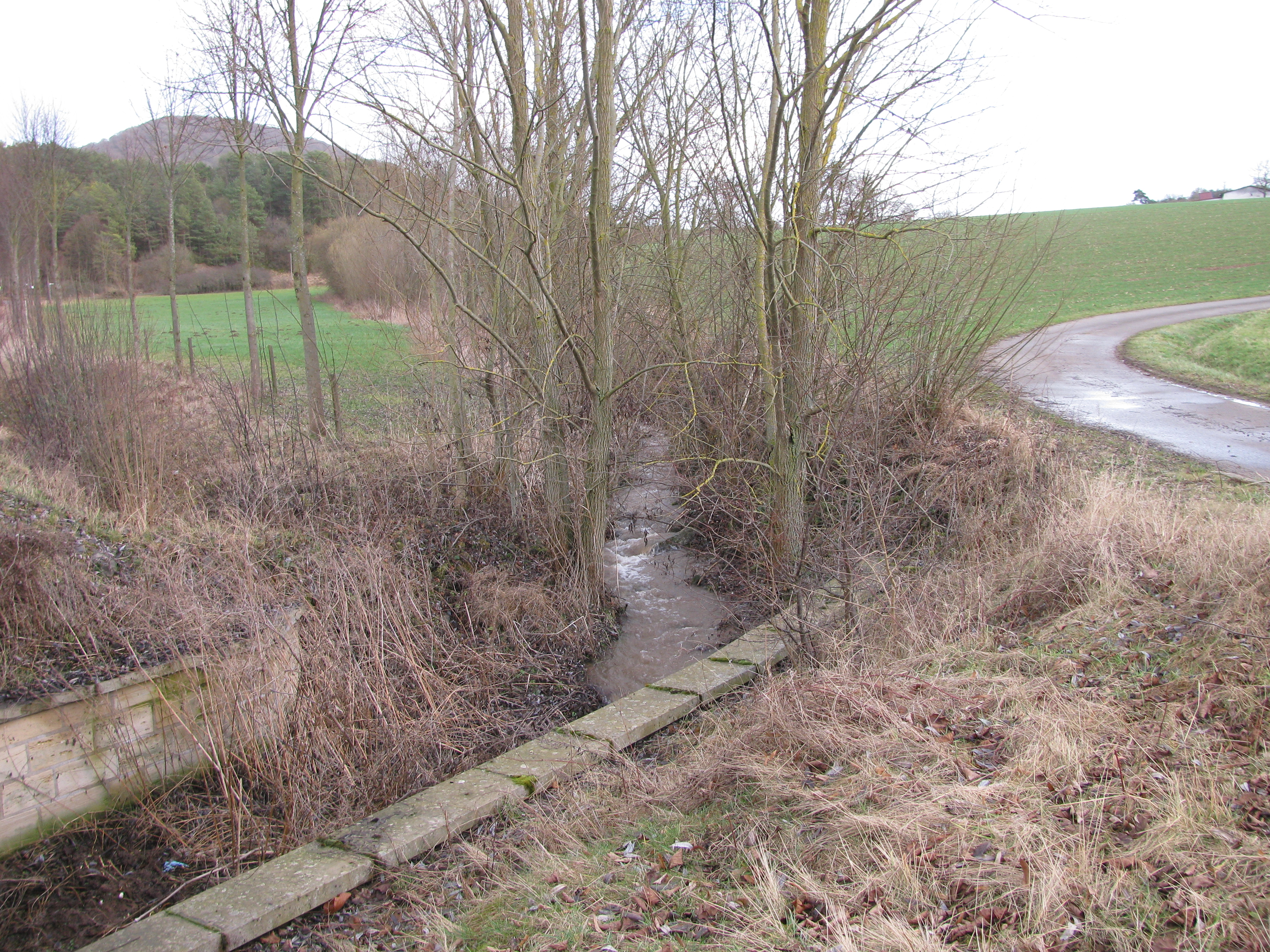

Location
- Country: Germany
- States: Hesse

Physical characteristics
- Mouth
  - location: Mühlenwasser
  - coordinates: 51.3273°N 9.1664°E

Basin features
- Progression: Mühlenwasser→ Erpe→ Twiste→ Diemel→ Weser→ North Sea

Limeckebach is a small river of Hesse, Germany. It flows into the Mühlenwasser in Wolfhagen.

== See also ==
- List of rivers of Hesse
