= Schützeberg =

Mountain in Germany

Coordinates: 51°20′28″N 9°11′44″E

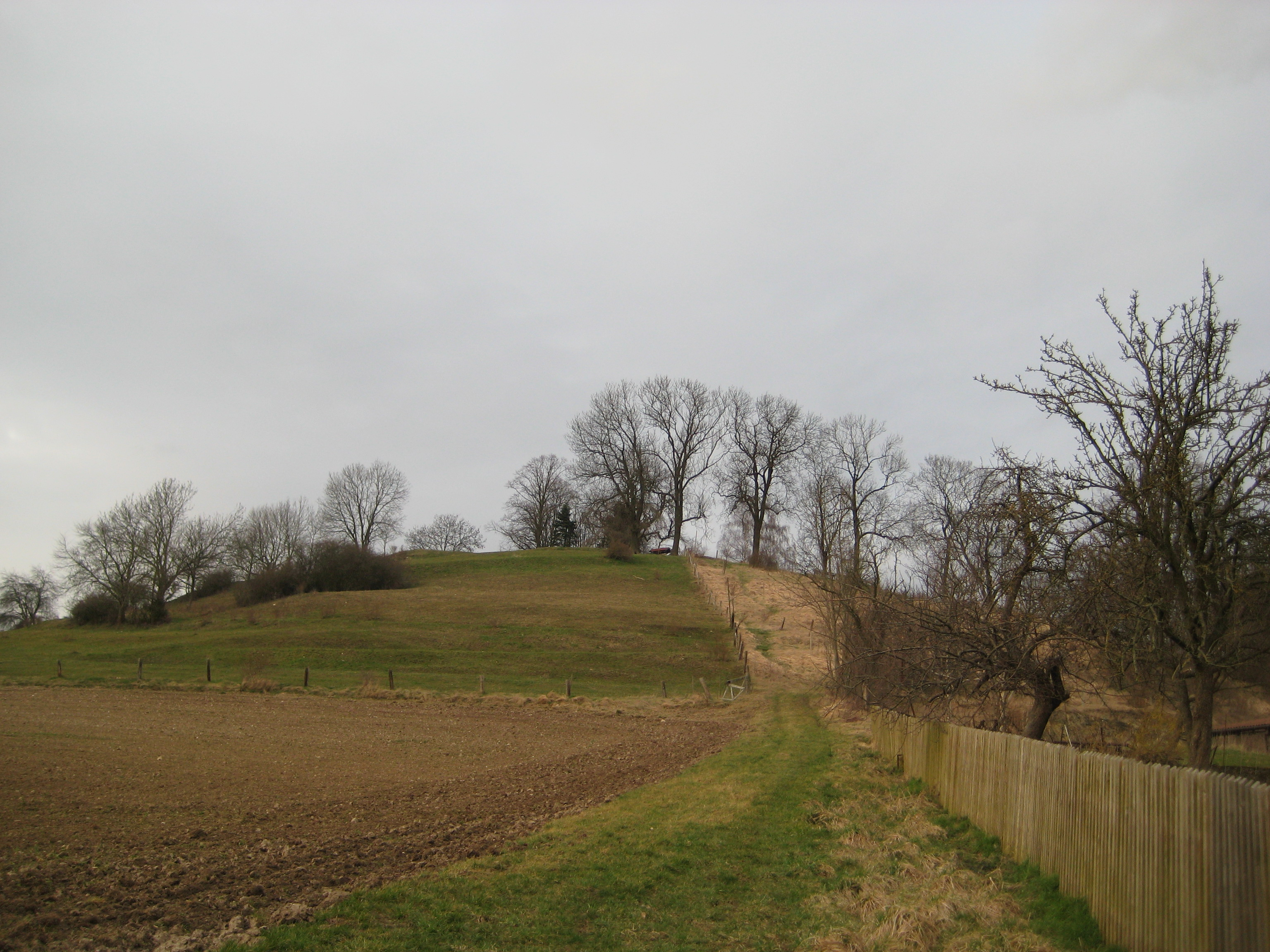
- View from the south from the Erpetal to the Schützeberg.

Highest point
- Elevation: 277.2 m (909 ft)

Geography
- Location: Hesse, Germany

Schützeberg is a hill of Hesse, Germany. It is part of the Wolfhagen Hills, which are a subunit of the West Hesse Highlands.

Schützeberg sits 277.2 meters above sea level and 45 meters above the valley of the Erpe (Twiste) river.
