= Dase (Erpe) =

River in Germany

Location
- Country: Germany
- State: Hesse

Physical characteristics
- Mouth
  - location: Erpe
  - coordinates: 51.3750°N 9.1664°E
- Length: 10.0 km (6.2 mi)

Basin features
- Progression: Erpe→ Twiste→ Diemel→ Weser→ North Sea

The Dase is a river of Hesse, Germany. This 10 km long river joins the Erpe on the right bank near Ehringen.

== See also ==
- List of rivers of Hesse
