= Weser Renaissance =

Form of Northern Renaissance architectural style

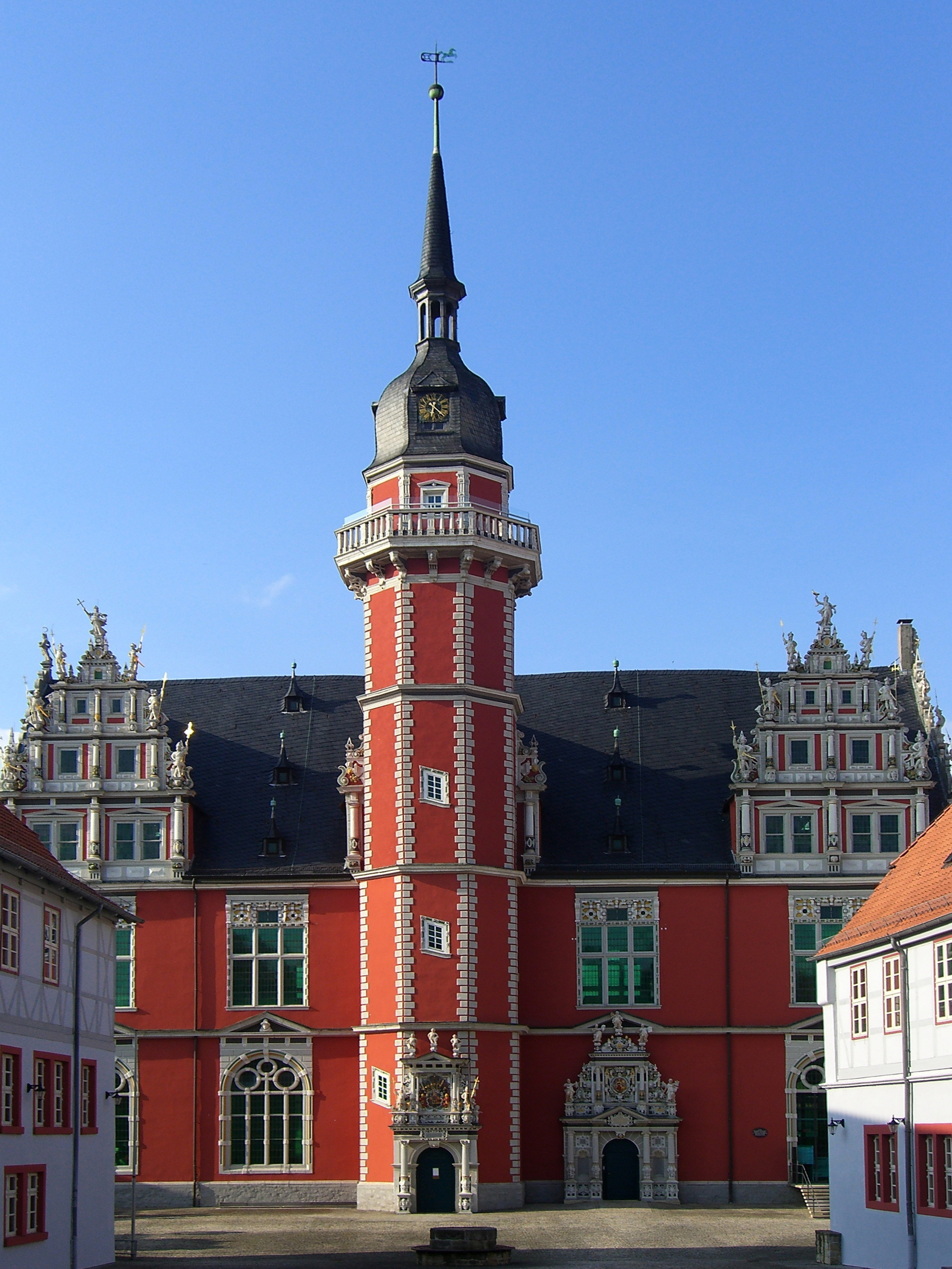
The Juleum in Helmstedt, a major example of the Weser Renaissance style. Historical great auditorium of the University, built in 1592.

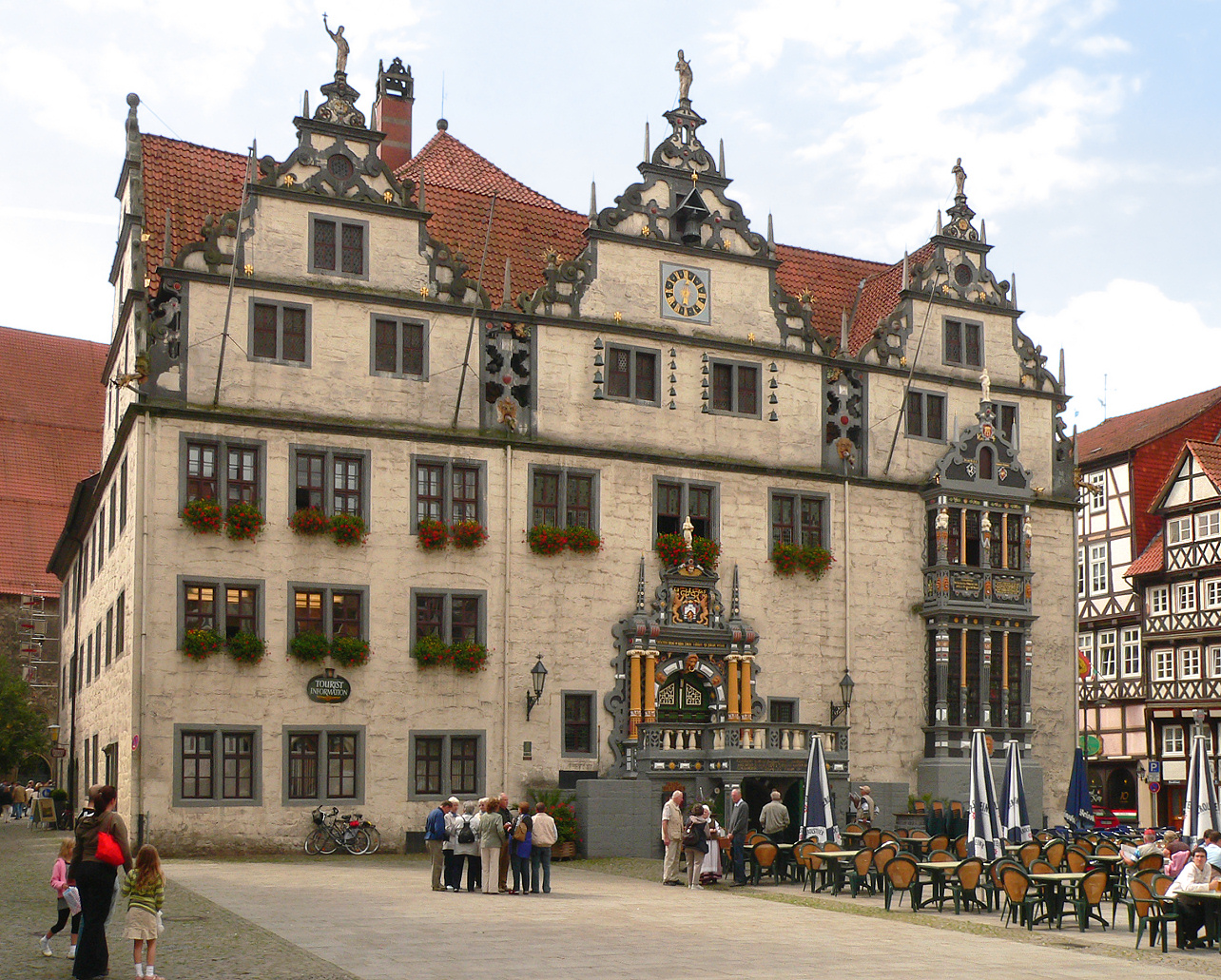
The town hall (Rathaus) in Hann. Münden

Weser Renaissance is a form of Northern Renaissance architectural style that is found in the area around the River Weser in central Germany and which has been well preserved in the towns and cities of the region.

== Background ==
Between the start of the Reformation and the Thirty Years War the Weser region experienced a construction boom, in which the Weser, playing a significant role in the communication of both trade and ideas, merely defined the north–south extent of a cultural region that stretched westwards to the city of Osnabrück and eastwards as far as Wolfsburg. Castles, manor houses, town halls, residential dwellings and religious buildings of the Renaissance period have been preserved in unusually high density, because the economy of the region recovered only slowly from the consequences of the Thirty Years War and the means were not available for a baroque transformation such as that which occurred to a degree in South Germany.

== Origin of the term ==
The term, coined around 1912 by Richard Klapheck, suggested that the Renaissance along the Weser independently developed its own distinct style. Max Sonnen, who used the newly coined term in 1918 in his book Die Weserrenaissance, classified buildings, without regard for the circumstances of their historical background, but from a purely formal perspective in order to derive a history of the development of the style. The notion of a regional renaissance in the sense of an autonomous cultural phenomenon was based on a nationalistic mindset that had arisen since the end of the 19th century, in which things provincial also had their place in establishing identity (other examples include German Sondergotik, Rhenish or Saxon Romanesque architecture).

In 1964, Jürgen Soenke and the photographer, Herbert Kreft, presented an inventory of Renaissance buildings, which also went under the title of Die Weserrenaissance. In its closing remarks it said: This architecture is rooted in the landscape in which it stands. It is folksy because those who created it [...] came from the people. The Weser Renaissance is, simply, folk art. For Soenke an autochthonous (indigenous) evolution of architectural style lay hidden behind its common features. His work, that appeared in six editions up to 1986, helped to give this art-historical concept a level of popularity that went far beyond the realm of the specialist and became a kind of popular trademark.

The term Weser Renaissance gained international recognition thanks to Henry-Russel Hitchcock, who used it in his German Renaissance Architecture of 1981, although he stressed its distinctive regional features rather less and pointed out its more significant linkages with the overall historical development of Renaissance architecture. In more recent times the idea of a regional cultural identity, that did not exist in the Early Modern Period, was criticised in research by the Weser Renaissance Museum at Brake Castle, which had been founded in 1986. This research highlighted the carriers of cultural transference, such as the architectural drawing business, non-local architects, pan-regional builders and the obligatory, Europe-wide requirements of court fashion.

== History ==
The hallmark of aristocratic building activity in the 16th century was the transformation of a medieval castle, the Burg, into a royal residence or Schloss. Initially these were often built with two wings, but later the enclosed courtyard, with its wings joined in the corners by imposing towers with flights of stairs, became the preferred layout for the homes of the aristocracy in the Weser region during the course of the 16th century, a form of building that was soon also adopted by its lesser noblemen. The characteristic Zwerchhaus (Middle High German: twerh = quer i.e. across or lateral) with so-called welsch (i.e. Italian) gables was particularly well suited as a symbol of power, because on castles like those at Detmold, Celle or Bückeburg, which were surrounded by high ramparts, they could be seen from a long way off. In addition to four-sided castles, there were also castles with three wings, either geometrically fully enclosed, like the Wewelsburg, or opening onto the castle farmyard as at Schwöbber. Even double-winged and single-winged buildings were included in the repertoire of castle architecture along the Weser.

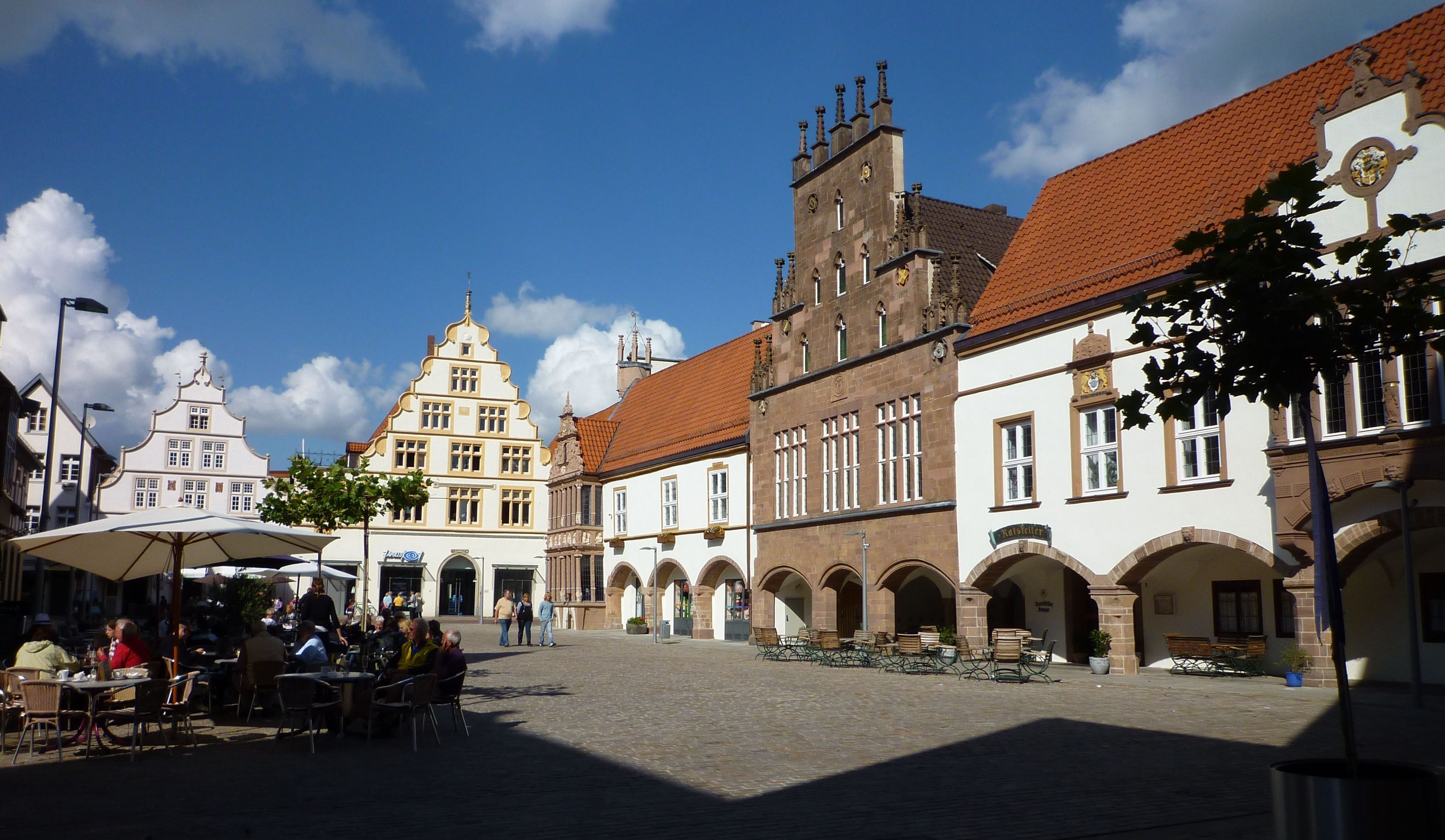
Old Hanseatic Town of Lemgo

These aristocratic designs were not only embraced by the lesser nobles; middle-class builders also copied the new forms of building in order to show off their growing social influence. Town halls, like those in Celle and Lemgo, were designed with gables along the sides and sometimes faced with an entire renaissance façade, as occurred in Bremen. From Nienburg, to Minden, Hamelin and Höxter, Hannoversch Münden and Einbeck magnificent townhouses appeared, that were often distinguished by their great gateway into the inner hall. Other important architectural features of the Weser Renaissance style are the ornately decorated gables, the use so-called Bossenquader or bossage stone, the alcoves (Standerker, Ausluchten or Utluchten) and double windows.

Church builders were also eager to explore new architectural designs. By elevating the position of the pulpit and placing it immediately opposite to and facing the pews, the importance of the spoken word within the Christian faith was also visible from the layout of the church interior. The castle chapels of Celle and Bückeburg are also clear examples of this arrangement as are the important parish churches of Wolfenbüttel and Bückeburg. Protestant art experienced a high point in the Weser region under the Schaumburg prince, Ernest, who at the beginning of the 17th century, had the Stadthagen Mausoleum and tomb built by Adriaen de Vries, which recalled the Florentine Renaissance. At the same time the goldsmith, Anton Eisenhoit created the altar decorations for the Catholic prince-bishop, Dietrich von Fürstenberg, and the sculptor Heinrich Gröninger, whose monumental tomb lies in Paderborn Cathedral.

== Weser Renaissance cities and towns ==
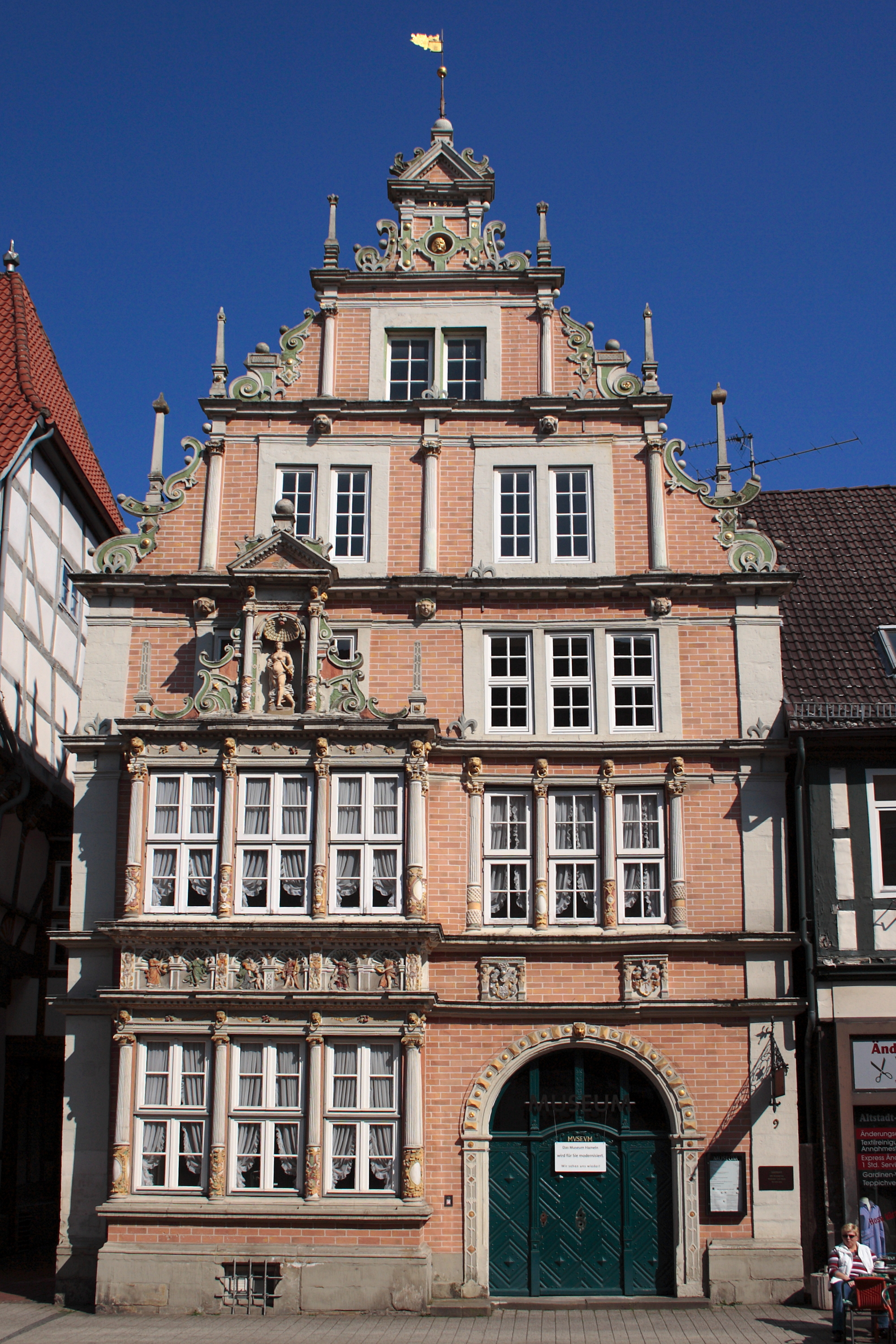
Leisthaus in Hamelin

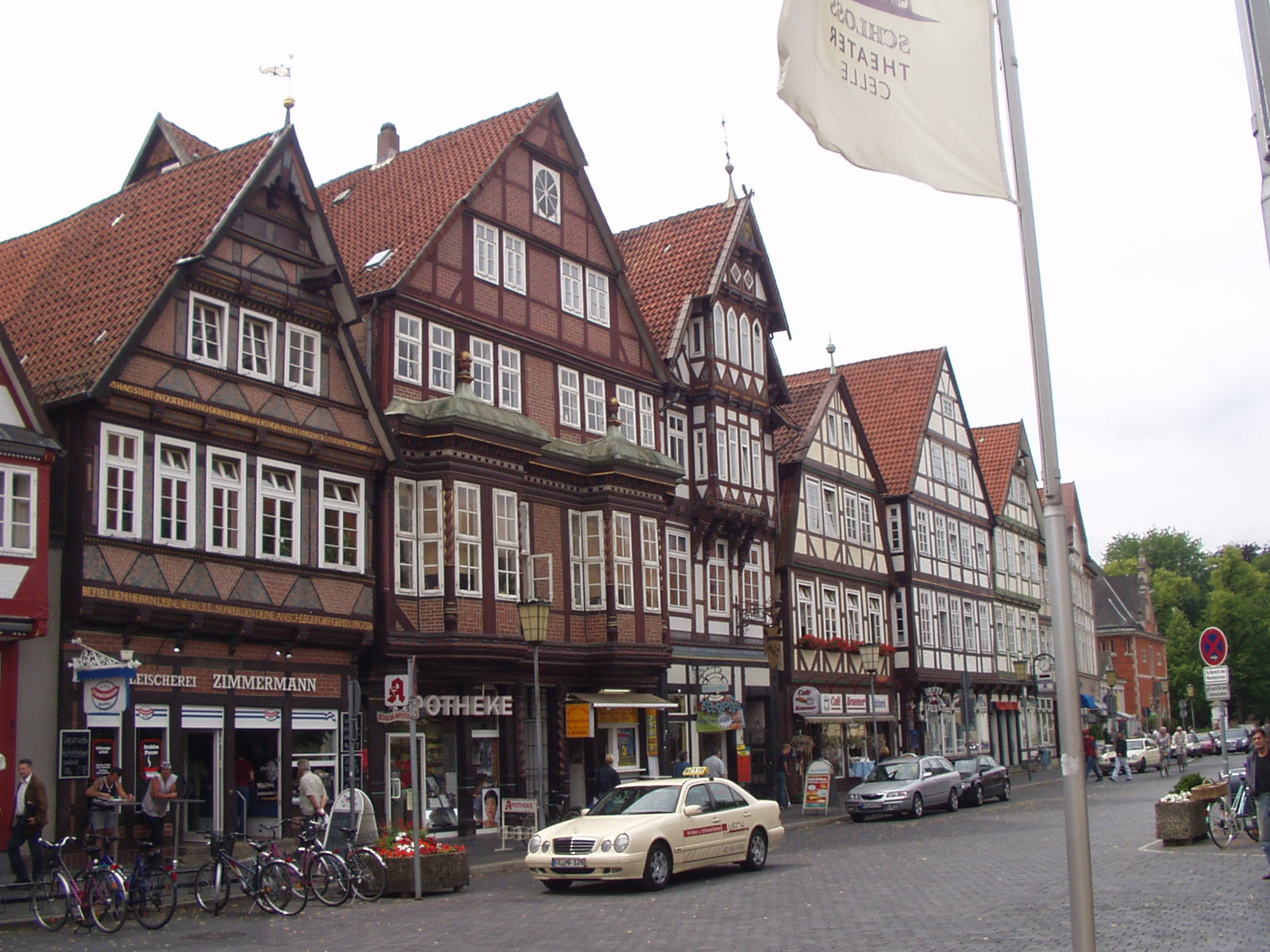
Old town of Celle

- Bad Hersfeld (Fulda → Weser)
- Bad Salzuflen (Werre → Weser)
- Barntrup (Bega → Werre → Weser)
- Bevern near Holzminden (Weser)
- Bielefeld (Westfälische Aa → Werre → Weser)
- Brakel (Brucht → Nethe)
- Bremen (Weser)
- Bückeburg (east of the Weser)
- Celle (Aller → Weser)
- Detmold (Werre → Weser)
- Einbeck (Ilme → Leine → Aller → Weser)
- Gifhorn (Aller → Weser)
- Hamelin (Weser)
- Hann. Münden (Weser)
- Helmstedt (Aller → Weser) easternmost example
- Hessisch Oldendorf (Weser)
- Höxter (Weser)
- Lemgo (Bega → Werre → Weser)
- Minden (Weser)
- Nienburg/Weser
- Paderborn (Pader → Lippe → Rhine)
- Rinteln (Weser)
- Stadthagen (east of the Weser)
- Steinheim (Emmer → Weser) (Water Castle Thienhausen)
- Wolfhagen-Elmarshausen (Erpe → Twiste → Diemel → Weser)
- Wolfsburg (Aller → Weser) northeasternmost example

== Well-known examples of Weser Renaissance ==
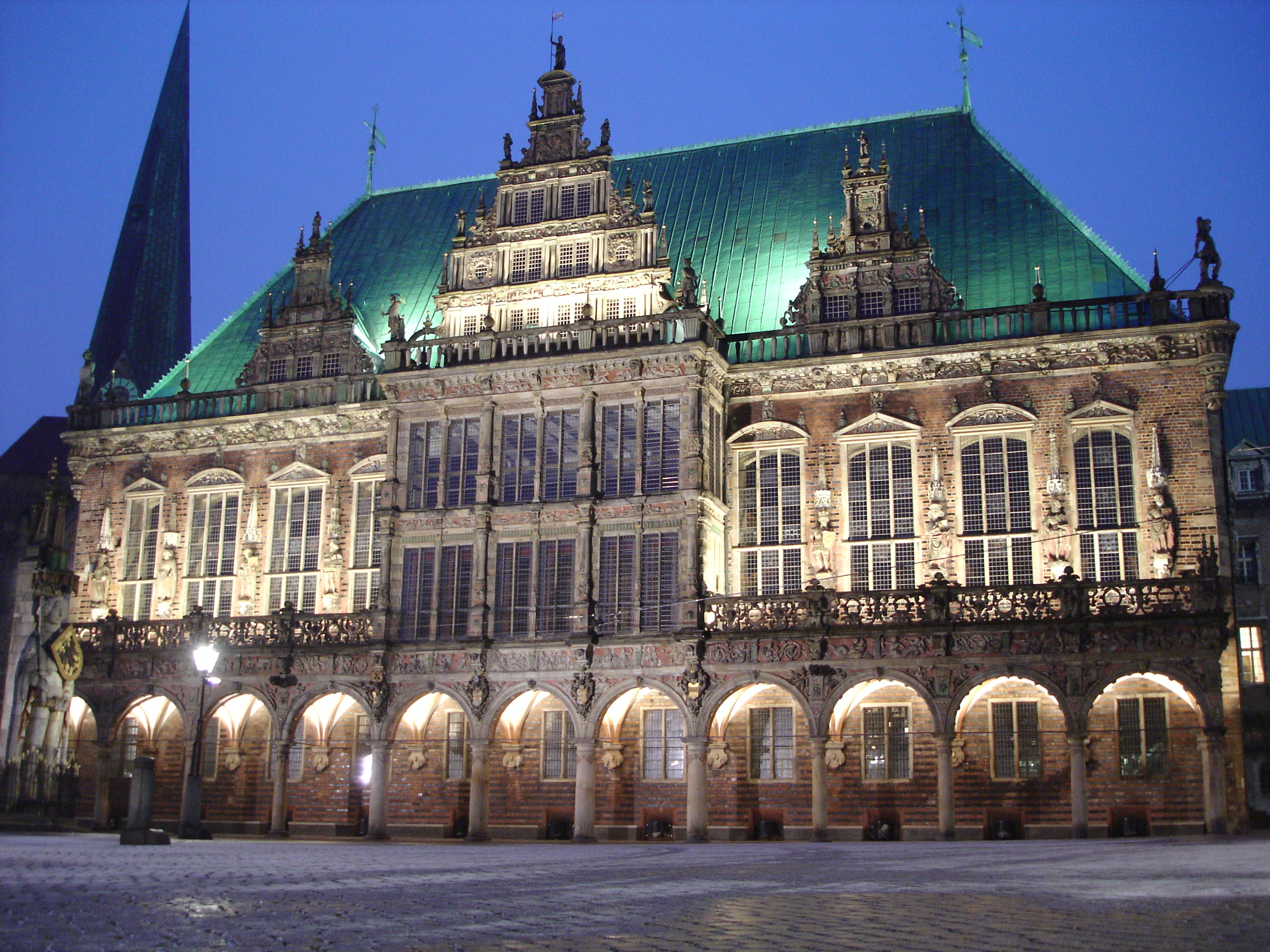
The City Hall of Bremen (UNESCO World Heritage)

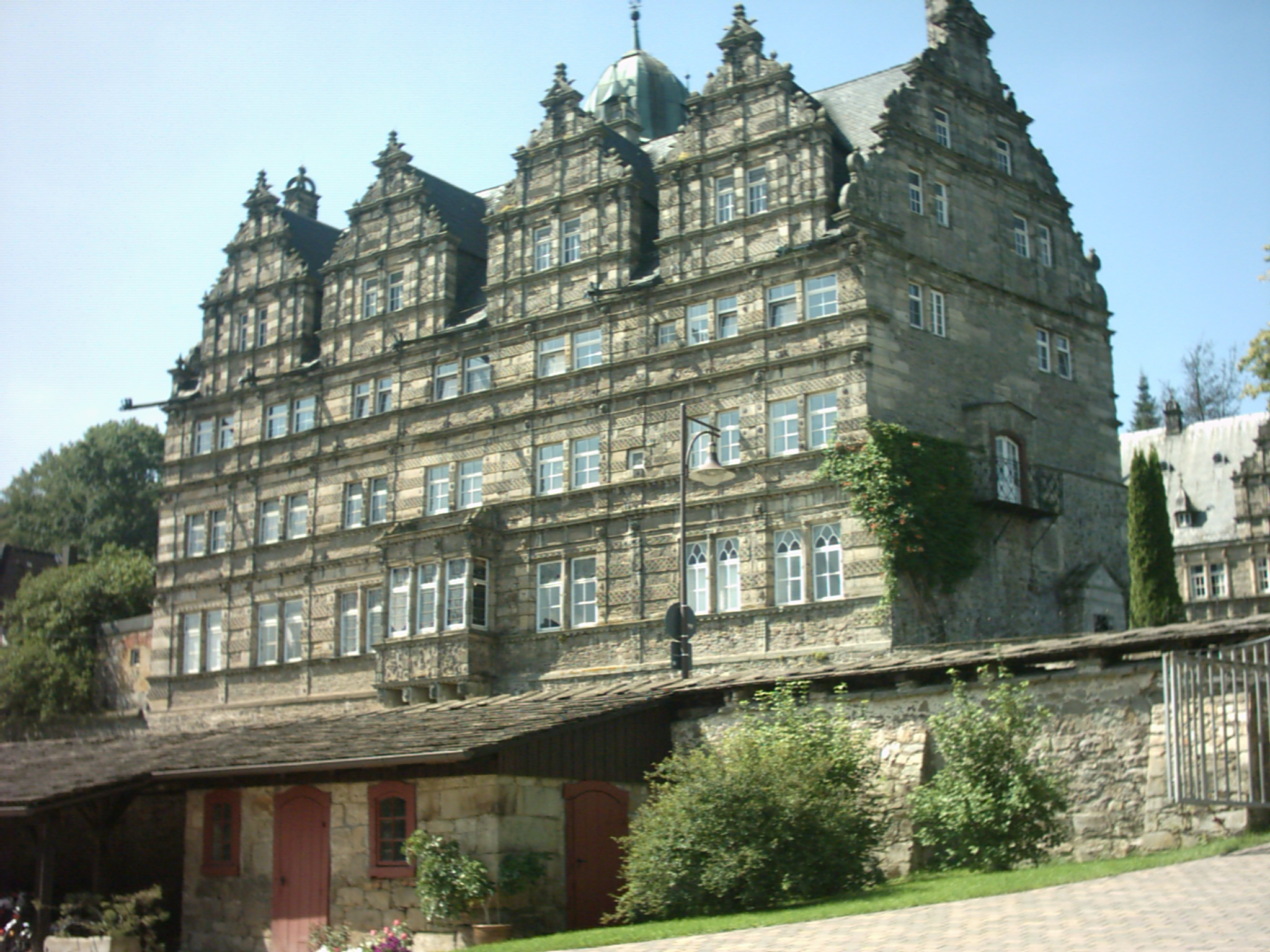
Hämelschenburg Castle in Emmerthal

- Eicke's House
- Detmold Royal Residence
- Brake Castle in Lemgo-Brake – home of the Weser Renaissance Museum
- The Hochzeitshaus in Hamelin
- Ratcatcher's House in Hamelin
- Town centre of Lemgo (Hexenbürgermeisterhaus, Lemgo Town Hall and many more)
- Varenholz Castle in Kalletal
- Bremen City Hall – UNESCO World Heritage Site since 2004
- Juleum Novum – Assembly hall building of the former University of Helmstedt
- Wolfsburg Castle – Cultural centre of the town of the same name
- Bevern Castle
- Neuhaus Castle
- Hämelschenburg
- Wewelsburg
- Bückeburg Castle
- Bückeburg Parish Church
- Stadthagen Castle
- Mausoleum in Stadthagen
- Schwöbber Castle
- Erbhof Thedinghausen

== Master Builders in the Weser Renaissance style ==
- Michael Clare from Schwerin and Weimar:
- Paul Francke: the Juleum in Helmstedt, Marienkirche in Wolfenbüttel
- Heinrich Overkotte: the abbey in Bad Gandersheimdating to 1600
- Johann Robyn from Ypres in Flanders: Steingang in Detmold Castle dating to 1557
- Cord Tönnis from Hamelin: Detmold Castle (Zwerch gable, under Jörg Unkair), the 1589 Leisthaus (for Gerd Leist the house at Osterstraße 9, Hamelin), the house at Bäckerstraße 16, 1568 Rattenfängerkrug, buildings in Rinteln, Schwöbber Castle (in Aerzen for Hilmar von Münchhausen)
- Jörg Unkair from Lustnau near Tübingen: the Residenz of Neuhaus near Paderborn, the 1532 water castle of Schelenburg in Bissendorf, Petershagen Castle, Stadthagen Castle, Detmold town hall and castle, possibly the water castle of Elmarshausen
- Hans Vredeman de Vries
- Eberhard Wilkening: Barntrup Castle, Hämelschenburg, Schwöbber Castle, the Hochzeitshaus in Hamelin
- Hermann Wulff: various buildings in Lemgo

By the Thirty Years War over 30 builders had worked in the Weser Renaissance style.

== Gallery illustrating the Weser Renaissance style ==
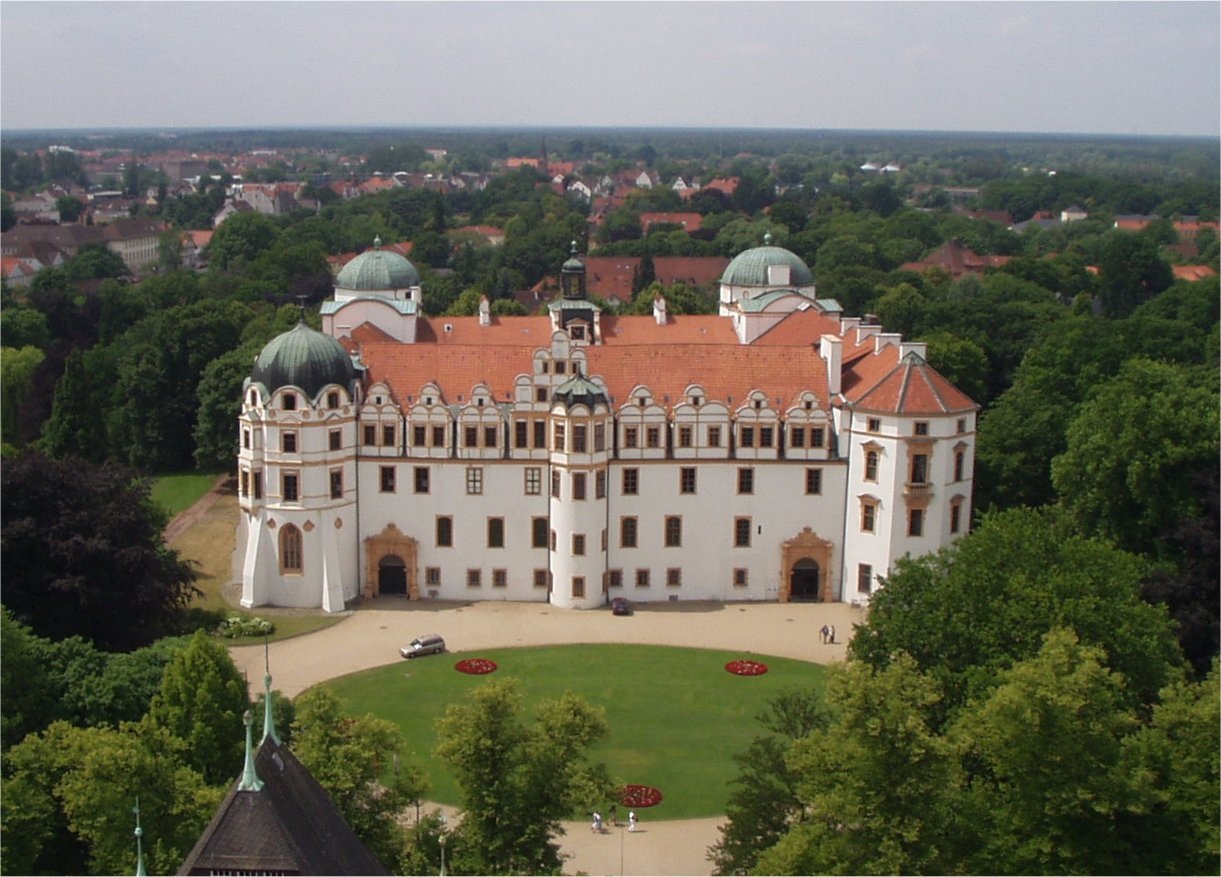
Castle in Celle

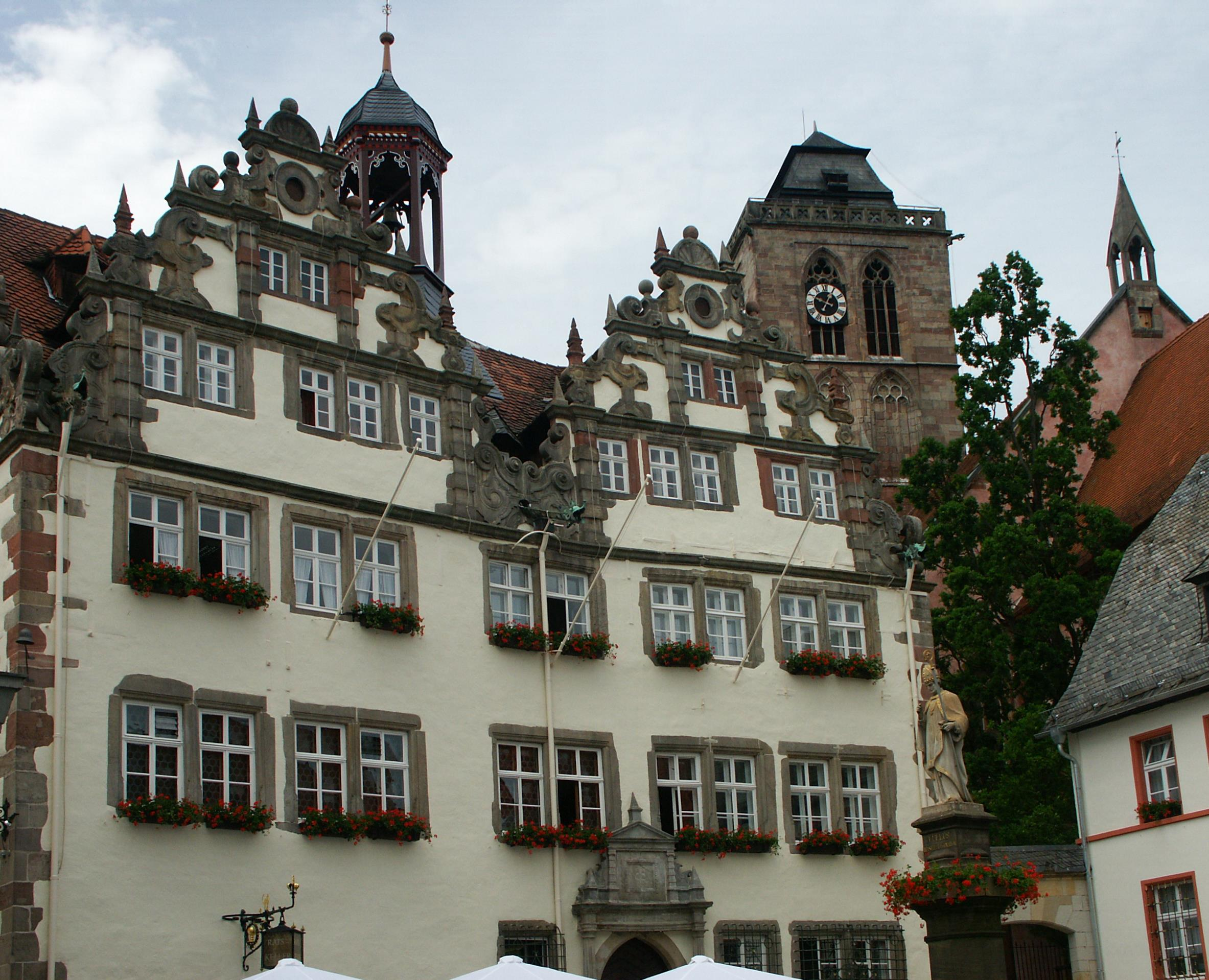
Town hall at Bad Hersfeld

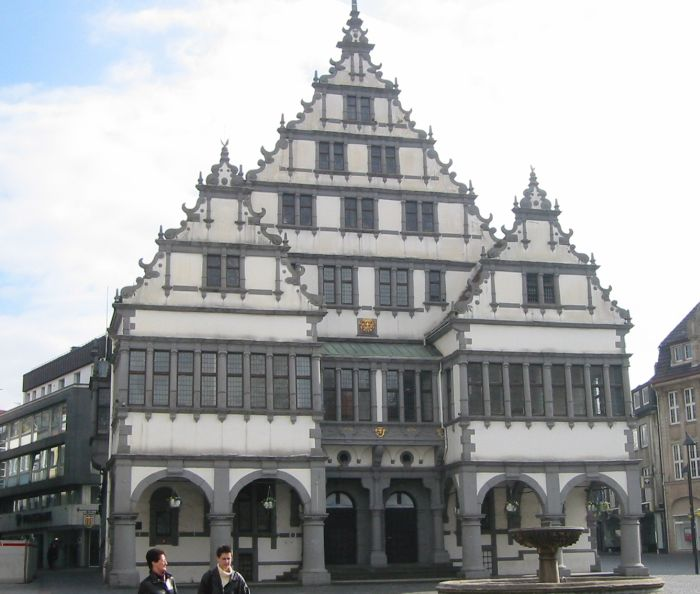
Historic Paderborn Town Hall

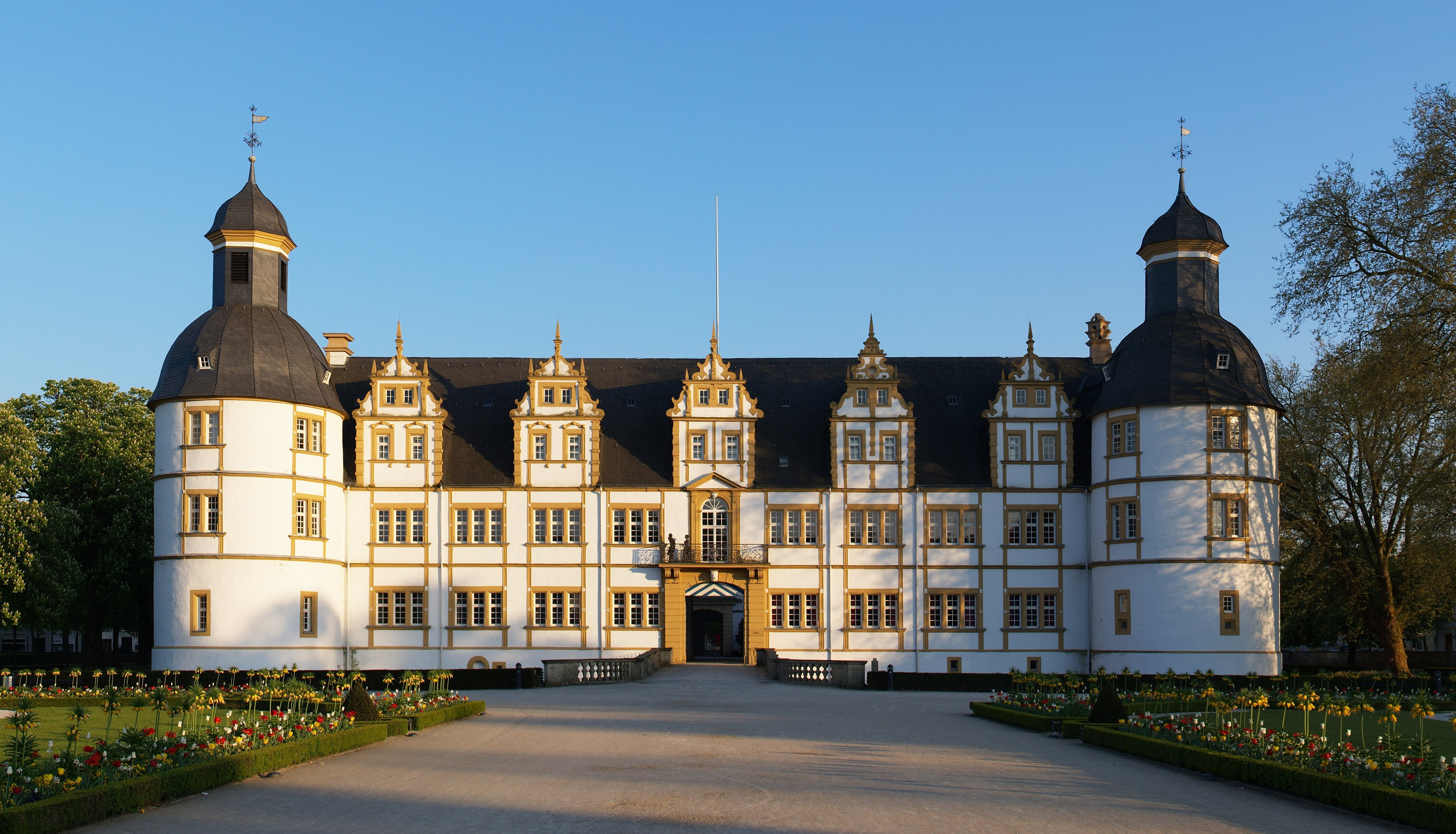
Neuhaus Castle in Paderborn

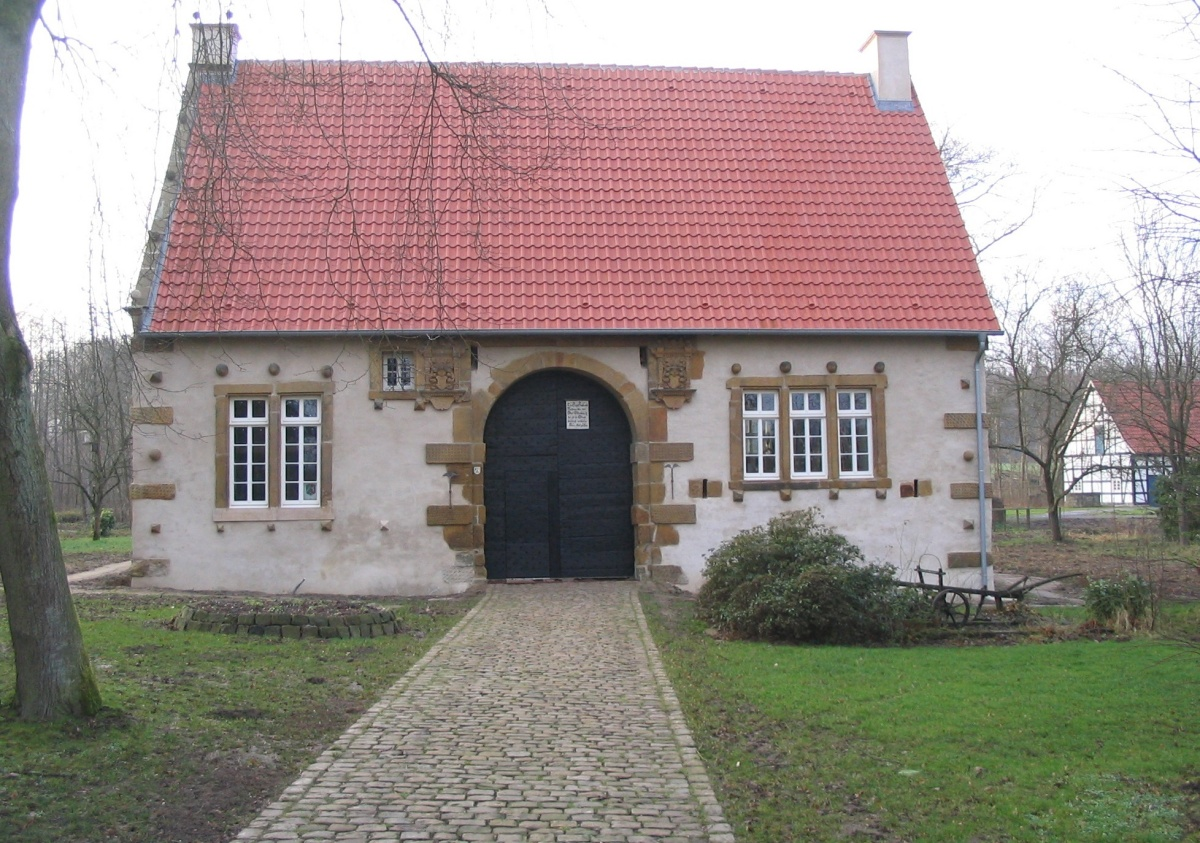
Gatehouse of the Werburg in Spenge

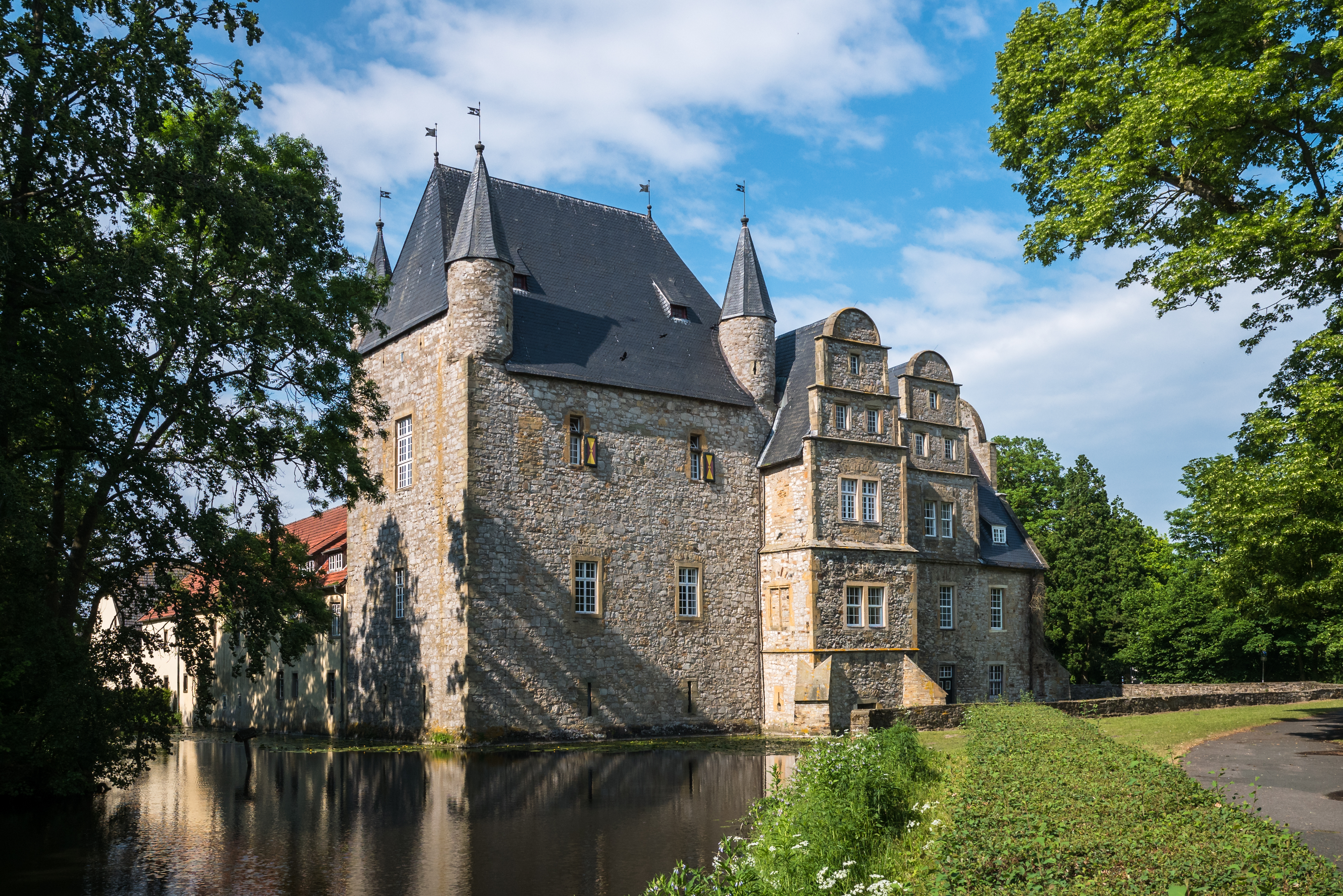
Schelenburg in Schledehausen

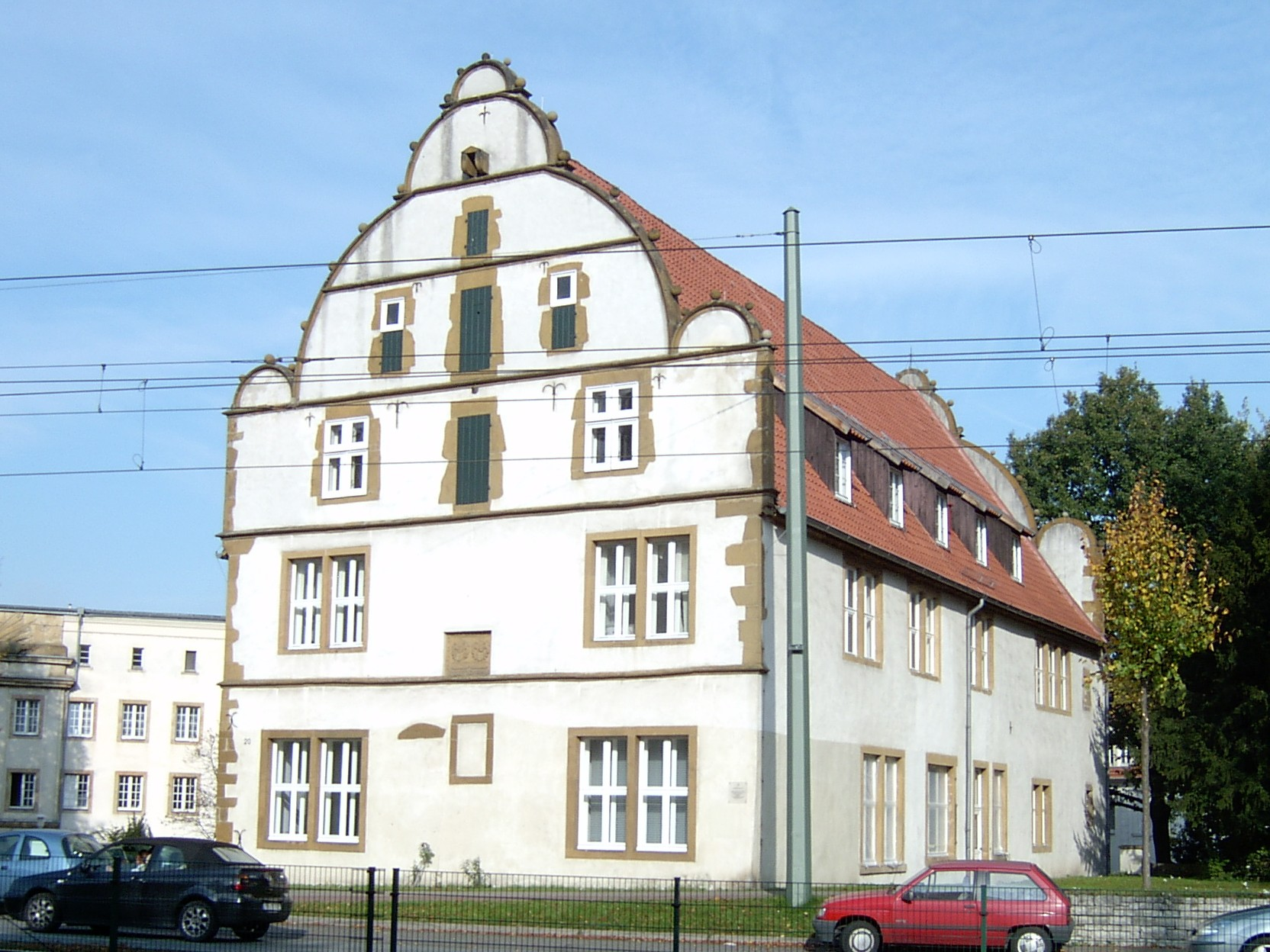
Spiegelshof in Bielefeld, built 1540

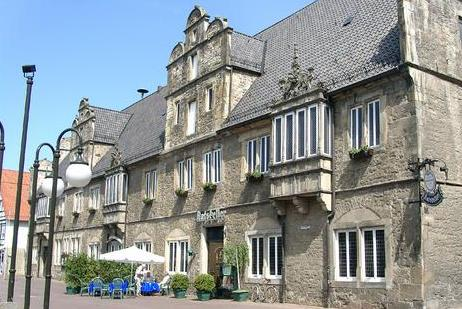
Old town hall in Stadthagen

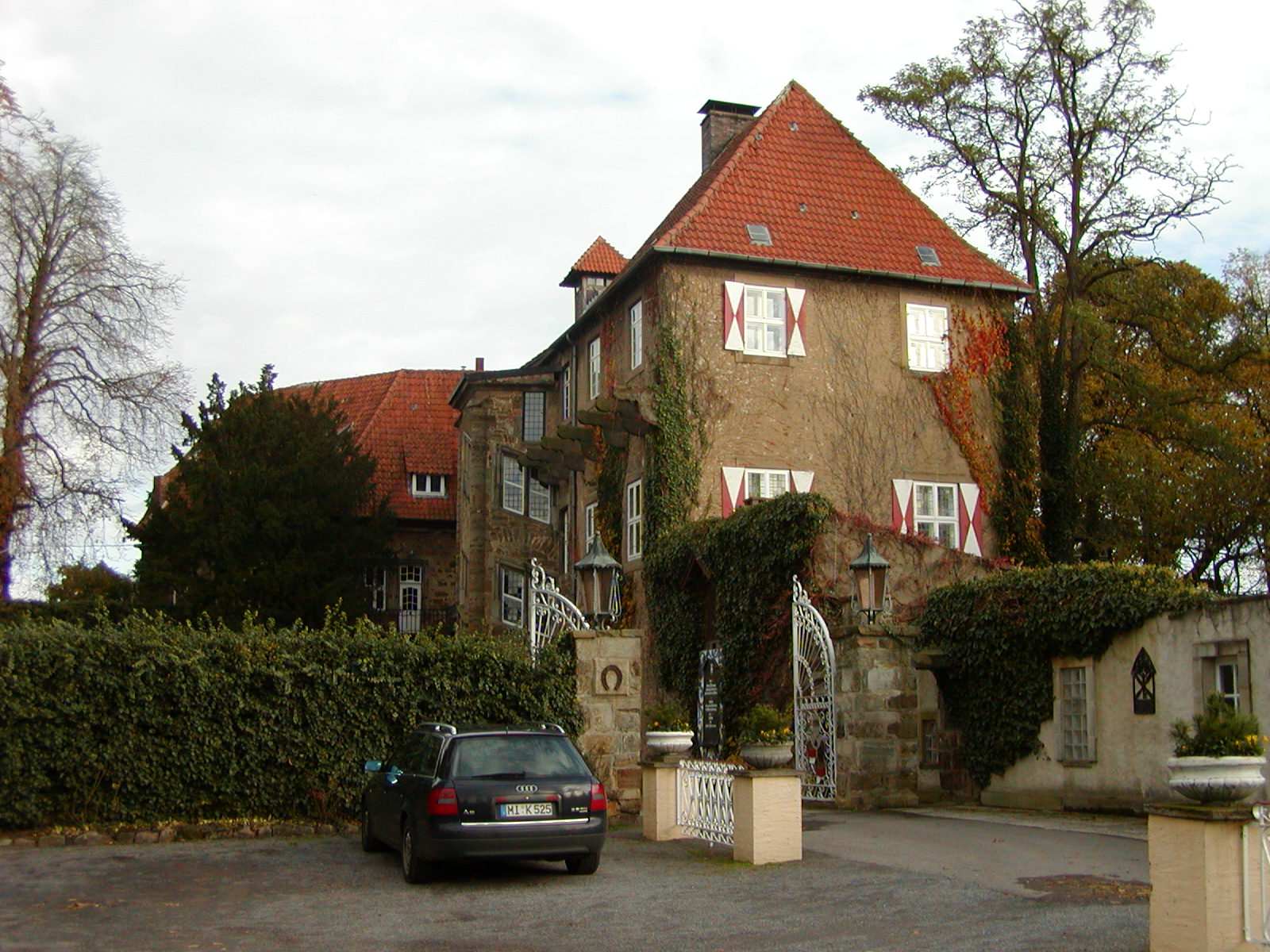
Petershagen Castle

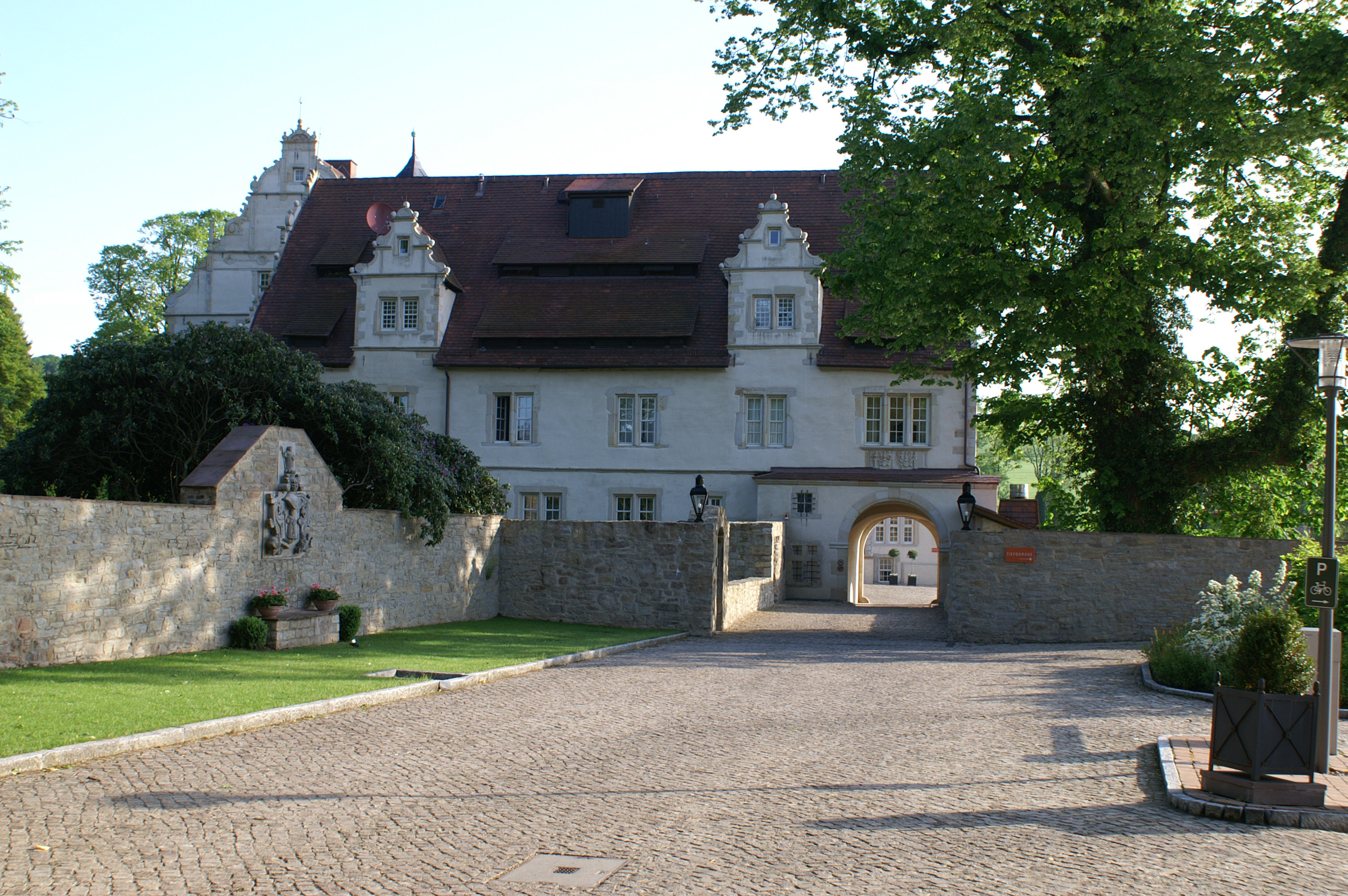
Schwöbber Castle entrance area

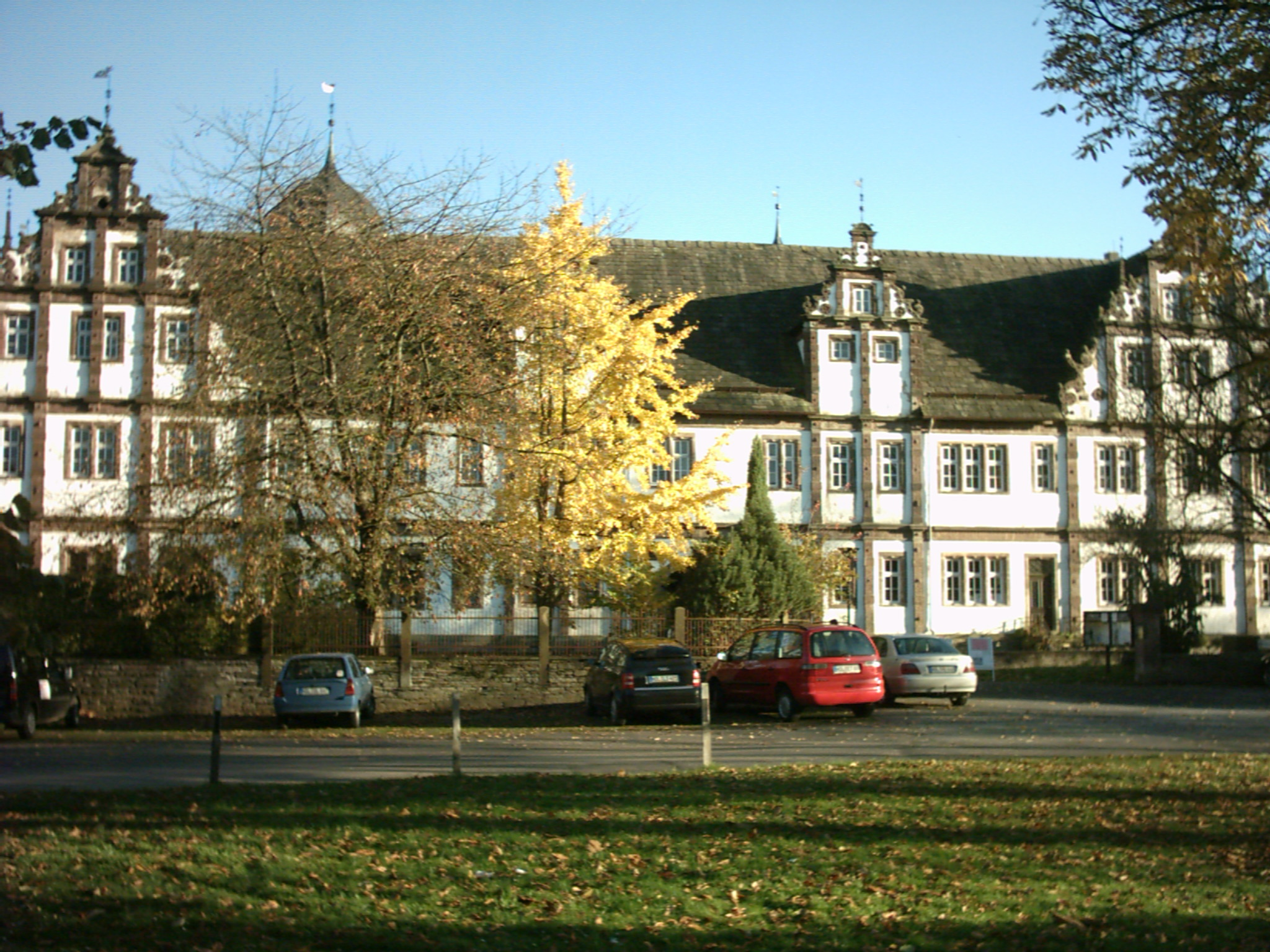
Bevern Castle

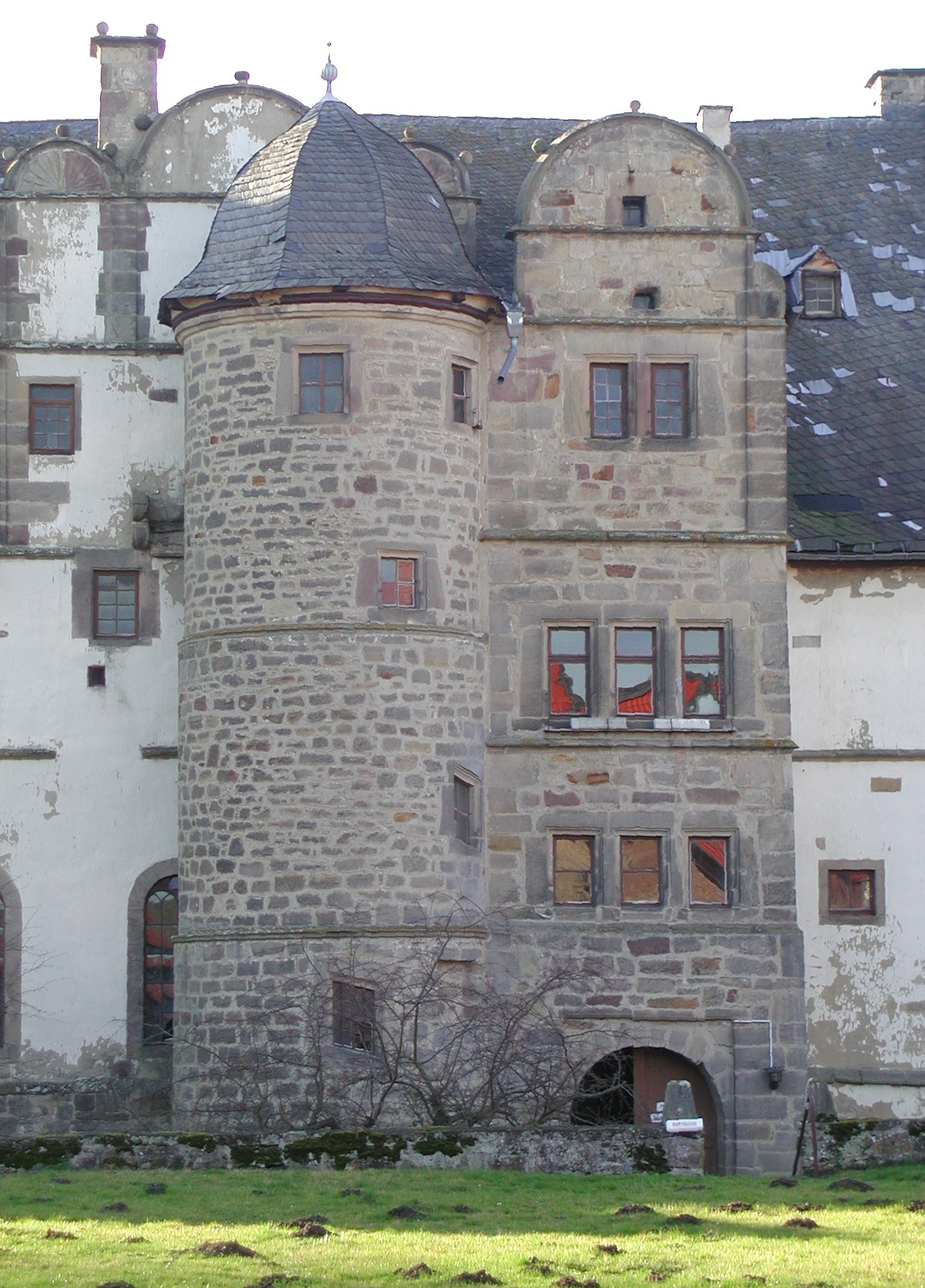
Water castle at Elmarshausen (Wolfhagen)

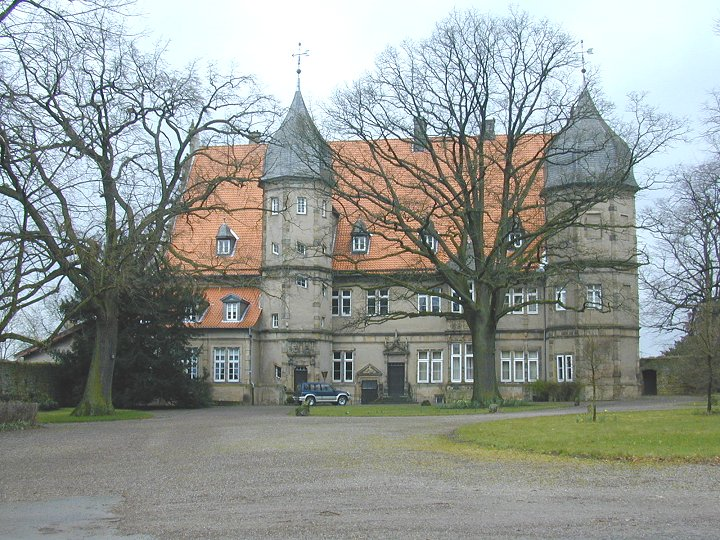
Kerssenbrock Castle (Barntrup)

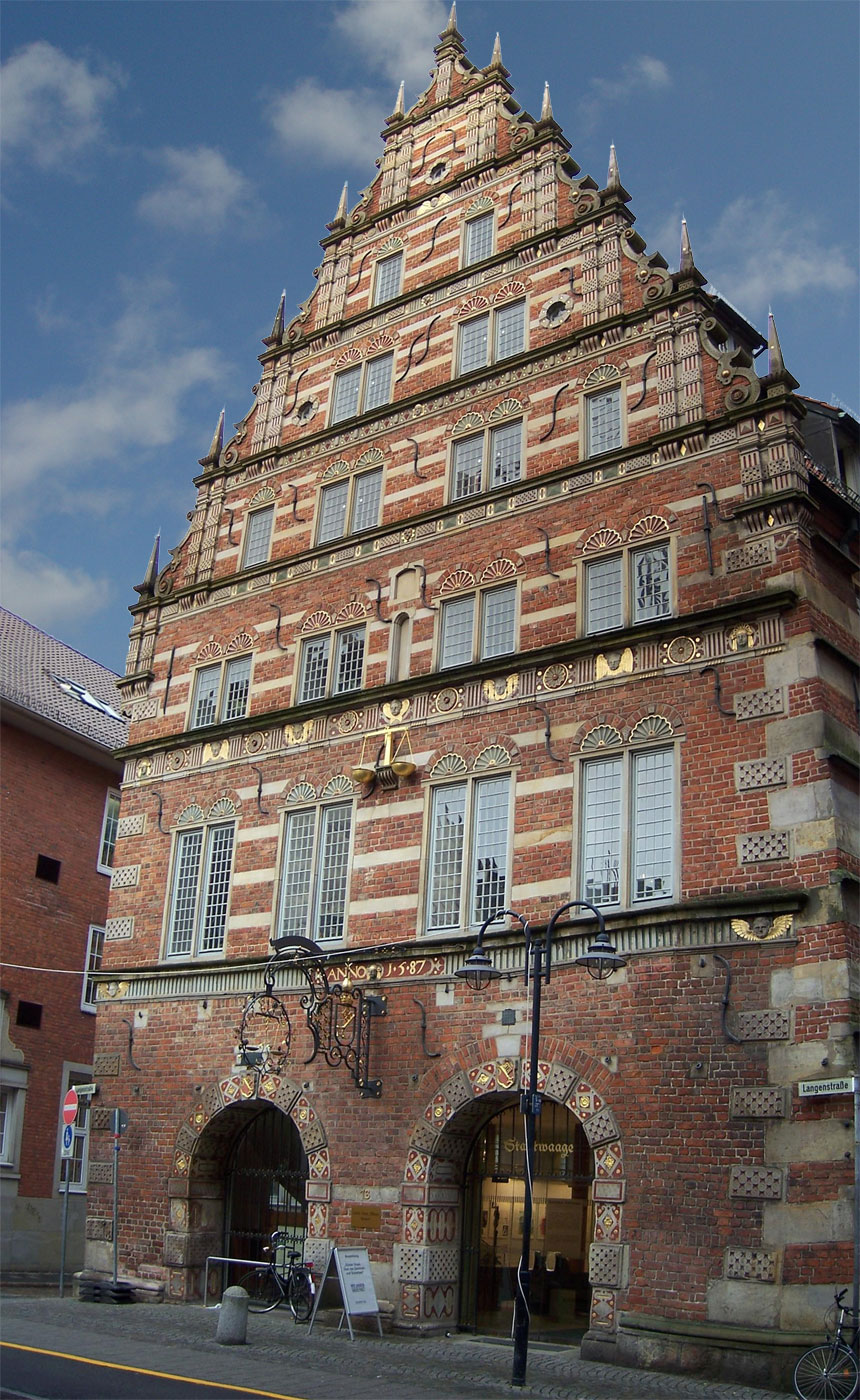
Weighing house in Bremen

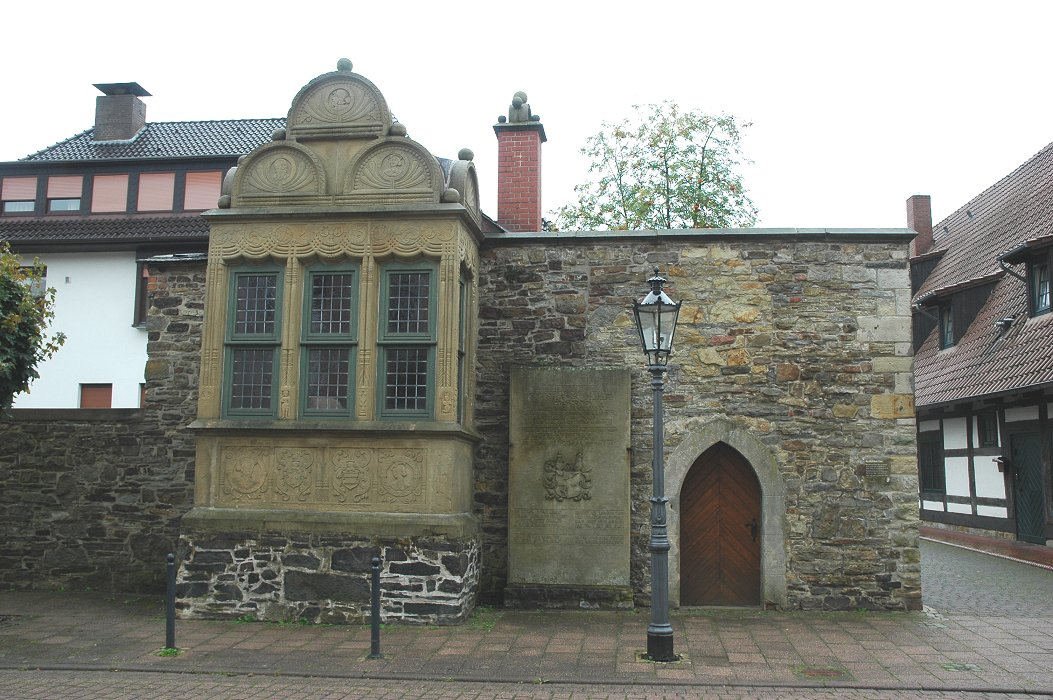
Archive house in Rinteln, according to the town the smallest building created in the Weser Renaissance style

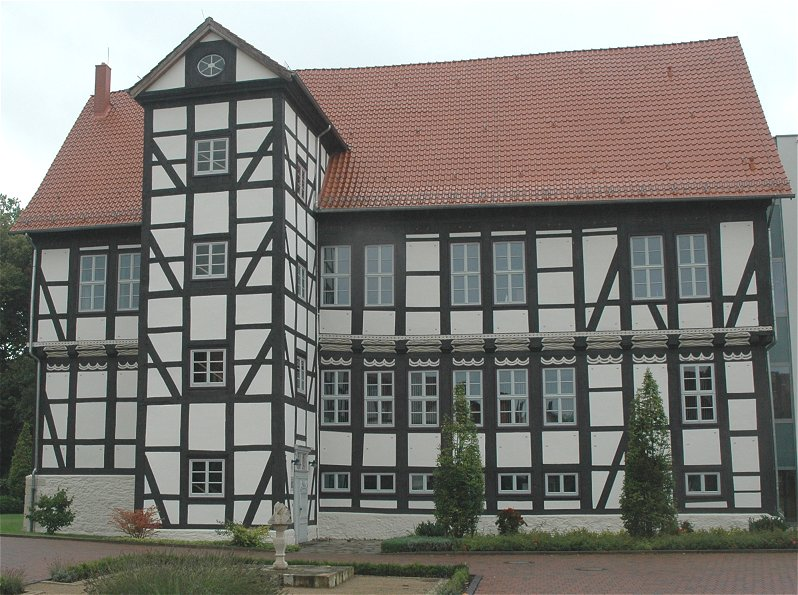
The Prinzenhof in Rinteln

== See also ==
- German Renaissance
- Road of Weser Renaissance

== Sources ==
- G. Ulrich Großmann: Renaissance entlang der Weser. Kunst and Kultur in Nordwestdeutschland zwischen Reformation und Dreißigjährigem Krieg, Cologne, 1989. ISBN 3-7701-2226-7
- G. Ulrich Großmann: Renaissance in the Weserraum. (Documents at the Weser Renaissance Museums, Brake Castle, 1 and 2), Munich/Berlin, 1989
- Herbert Kreft and Jürgen Soenke: Die Weserrenaissance. 6th revised edn., Hamelin, 1986. ISBN 3-8271-9030-4
- Max Sonnen: Die Weserrenaissance, Munster, 1918
- Elisabeth Kuster-Wendenburg (Text) and Albert Gerdes (photographs): Der Bremer Stein und die Weserrenaissance. MARUM_RCOM-Bibliothek, Bremen 2002. Free pdf at
- Gabriele Brasse: Straße der Weserrenaissance. Ein Kunstreiseführer, Hamelin, 1991
- José Kastler, Vera Lüpkes (ed.): Die Weser. Einfluss in Europa, Exhibition Catalogue, Weser Renaissance Museum, Brake Castle, Holzminden, 2000
- Vera Lüpkes, Heiner Borggrefe (ed.): Adel im Weserraum um 1600, Exhibition Catalogue, Weser Renaissance Museum, Brake Castle, Munich, Berlin 1996
- Anne Schunicht-Rawe, Vera Lüpkes (ed.): Handbuch der Renaissance. Deutschland, Niederlande, Belgien, Österreich, Cologne, 2002
- Michael Bischoff and Rolf Schönlau: Weser & Renaissance. Wege durch eine Kulturregion, Holzminden, 2007. ISBN 978-3-931656-29-4
- Michael Bischoff and Hillert Ibbeken (ed.): Schlösser der Weserrenaissance, Stuttgart, London, 2008. ISBN 978-3-936681-23-9
