= Dase =

Dase may refer to:

- Official romanization of Dessie, a city and woreda in Amhara Region, Ethiopia
- Zacharias Dase (1824–1861), German mental calculator
- Dase (Erpe), a river of Hesse, Germany, tributary of the Erpe
