= Mühlenwasser =

River in Germany

Location
- Country: Germany
- State: Hesse

Physical characteristics
- Mouth
  - location: Erpe
  - coordinates: 51.3404°N 9.1902°E
- Length: 11.3 km (7.0 mi)

Basin features
- Progression: Erpe→ Twiste→ Diemel→ Weser→ North Sea

Mühlenwasser is a river of Hesse, Germany. It flows into the Erpe near Wolfhagen.

== See also ==
- List of rivers of Hesse
