= Watter (Twiste) =

River in Germany

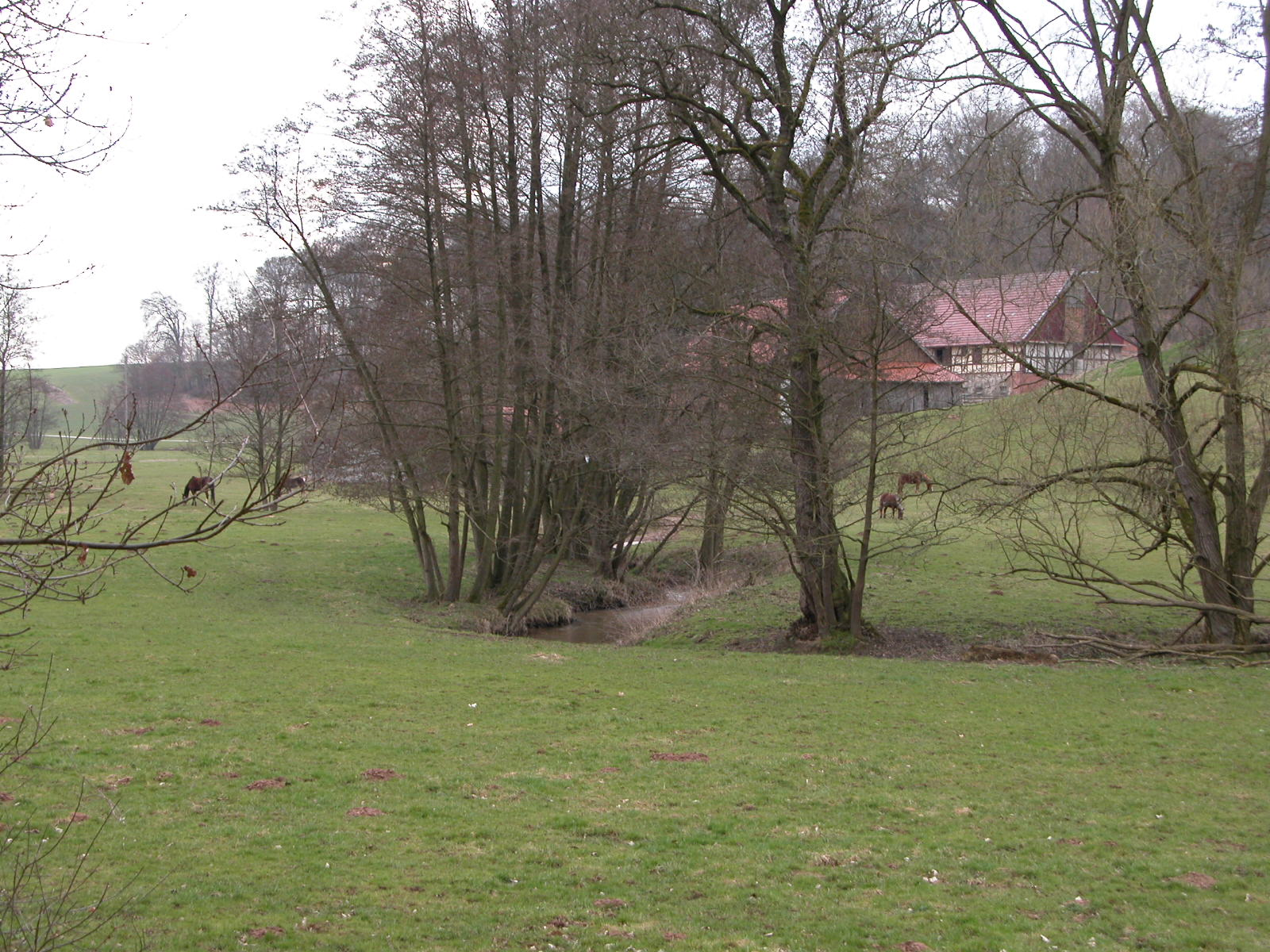
- The Watter near Vahlhausen

Location
- Country: Germany
- State: Hesse

Physical characteristics
- Mouth
  - location: Twiste
  - coordinates: 51.4002°N 9.0958°E
- Length: 21.9 km (13.6 mi)

Basin features
- Progression: Twiste→ Diemel→ Weser→ North Sea

The Watter is a 21.9-kilometre-long (13.6 mi) tributary of the Twiste river of Hesse, Germany. It flows into the Twiste near Volkmarsen.

== See also ==
- List of rivers of Hesse
