= Road of Weser Renaissance =

The Road of Weser Renaissance (German: Straße der Weserrenaissance) is a well-known tourist route in North Germany. As a cultural route it links famous architectural monuments of the Weser Renaissance period in the 16th and early 17th centuries.

The road runs through the German federal states of Hesse, North Rhine-Westphalia, Lower Saxony and Bremen.

== Description ==
The Road of Weser Renaissance links castles and stately homes, town halls and town houses of stone or timber-frame construction, that bear witness to the economic and cultural boom in the century before the Thirty Years War (1618–1648).

Along the road between Hann. Münden and Bremen there are numerous Renaissance buildings in a density that is found nowhere else in Germany. The term Weser Renaissance is misleading, in that it did not stem from an independent regional variation of the Renaissance. In fact, the Renaissance buildings in the Weser region show evidence of the existing Europe-wide links in the field of architecture. These enabled the concepts and thinking of the Renaissance to spread out from Italy even to the lands north of the Alps.

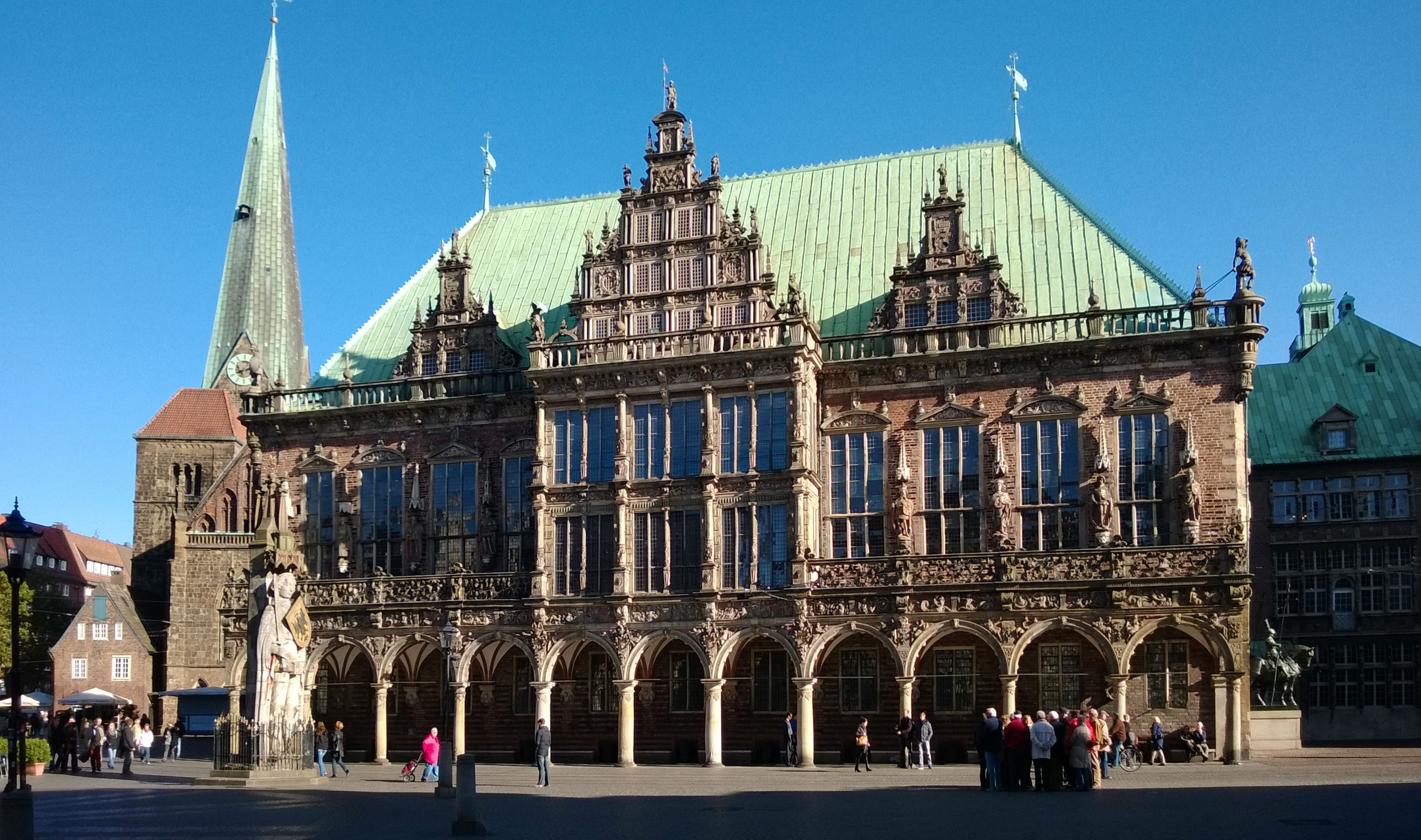
The Bremen City Hall

== Buildings ==
Some of the most striking of the many sights along this route are the castles of Hämelschenburg, Bückeburg, Detmold, Brake, Neuhaus, Bevern, Stadthagen, Celle and Hann. Münden. Town halls such as those in Bremen, Nienburg, Rinteln, Paderborn or Hannoversch Münden also convey an impression of the splendour of the Weser Renaissance period, as do the imposing town houses of Minden, Lemgo and Hameln. Equally impressive are the richly carved timber-framed facades, especially in Einbeck, Höxter, Brakel and Bad Salzuflen. Of great importance from an art-historical perspective is the heptagonal mausoleum in Stadthagen, which is reminiscent of the Florentine Renaissance. A museum dedicate to the period and its architecture, the Weser Renaissance Museum, is housed in Brakel Castle.
