= Twistesee =

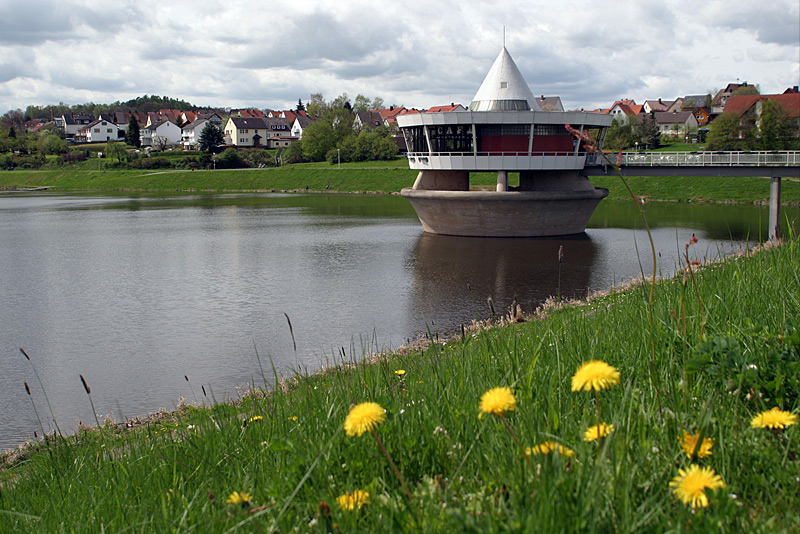
- The Twistesee with its dam and restaurant (above the overflow funnel of the flood relief tower) and the village of Wetterburg
- Interactive map of Twistesee
- Location: Waldeck-Frankenberg
- Coordinates: 51°23′02″N 09°03′45″E
- Construction began: 1971
- Opening date: 1981

Dam and spillways
- Impounds: Twiste
- Height (foundation): 23.5 m (77.1 ft)
- Height (thalweg): 21.5 m (70.5 ft)
- Length: 275 m (902 ft)
- Elevation at crest: 216.5 m (710.3 ft)
- Width (crest): 6 m (20 ft)
- Width (base): 135 m (443 ft)

Reservoir
- Total capacity: 430,000 m^{3} (15,000,000 ft^{3})
- Active capacity: 9,100,000 m^{3} (320,000,000 ft^{3})
- Catchment area: 125.1 km²
- Surface area: 76 ha (0.76 km²)
- Maximum length: 2.75 km
- Maximum width: ca. 300 m

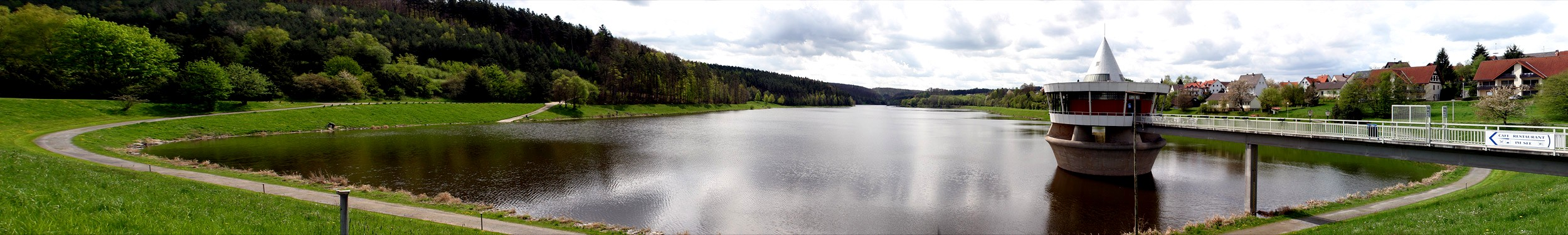
Twistesee panorama

The Twistesee is a reservoir on the Twiste in the county of Waldeck-Frankenberg in North Hesse, Germany.

== Location ==
The Twistesee is located at the northern end of the Langer Wald around 30 km as the crow flies west-northwest of Kassel between Bad Arolsen in the west, Volkmarsen to the northeast and Wolfhagen to the southeast. The reason for its construction was the so-called Henry Flood (Heinrichsflut) on 16/17 July 1965 that caused serious damage and destruction in the catchment areas of the Twiste and Diemel rivers. Near one riverside village, Wetterburg, the Twiste was impounded by a dam to form a very large flood retention basin in order to control the water level.

== Sights ==
Among the sights in the vicinity of the Twistesee are:

- Bad Arolsen, the best known destination near the reservoir.
- Neu-Berich, a village with an interesting past, near the lake.
- Landau, somewhat southeast of the reservoir, has an historical old town which is entirely protected, a palace, an historical town church and the Landauer Wasserkunst, an historical water supply system.
- Near Volkhardinghausen, not far south of the reservoir, stands the French Oak (Franzoseneiche).

== Literature ==
- Peter Franke, Wolfgang Frey: Talsperren in der Bundesrepublik Deutschland. DNK – DVWK 1987, ISBN 3-926520-00-0

== See also ==
- List of dams in Germany
