= Eduard von Schele zu Schelenburg =

German politician (1805–1875)

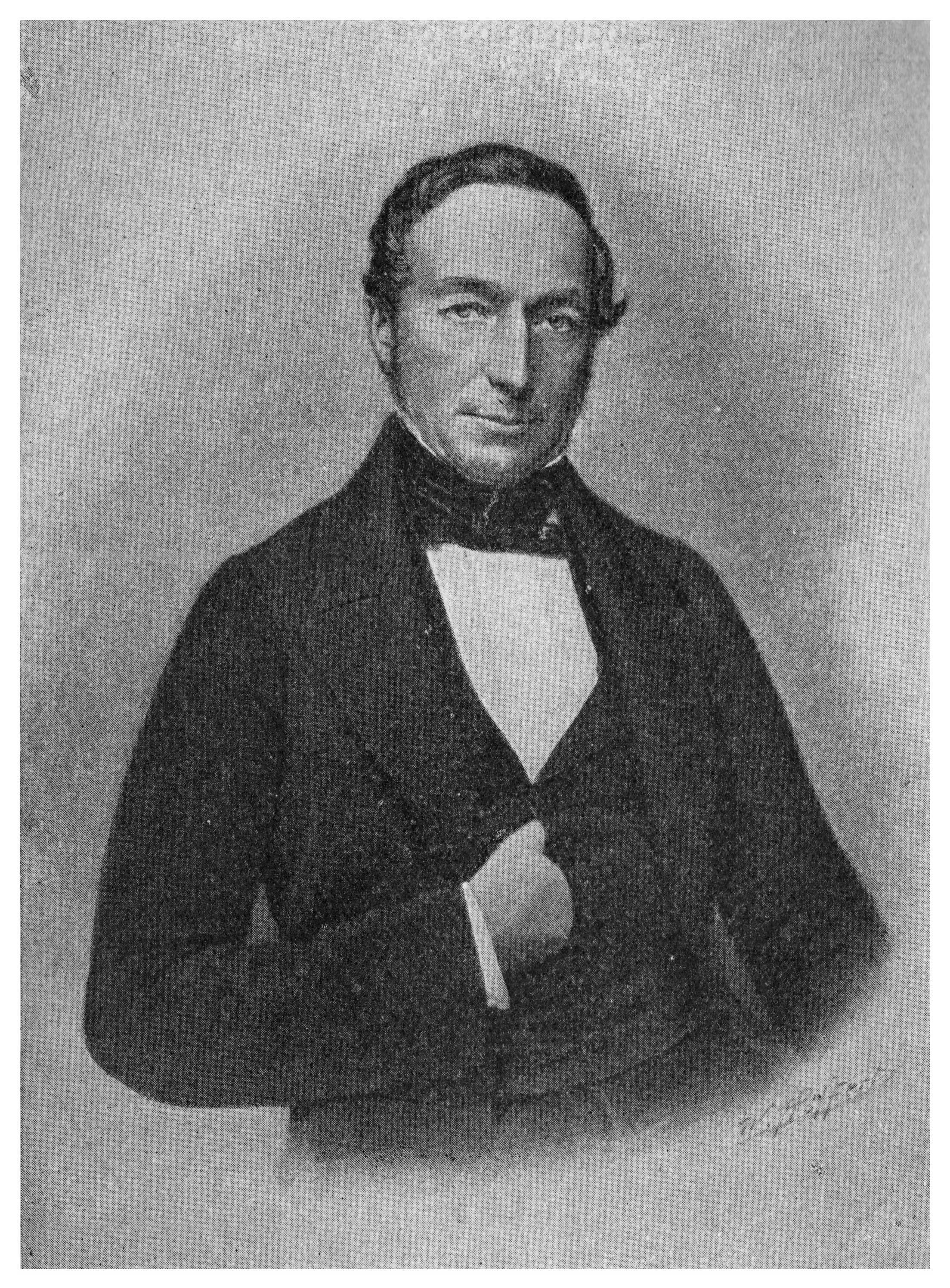
Eduard von Schele

Eduard August Friedrich Freiherr von Schele zu Schelenburg (September 23, 1805 – February 13, 1875) was Prime Minister of the Kingdom of Hanover and the last Post Director General of the Thurn-und-Taxis Post in Frankfurt.

He was born and buried in Schelenburg.
