= Thurn-und-Taxis Post =

Successor to the Imperial Reichspost of the Holy Roman Empire

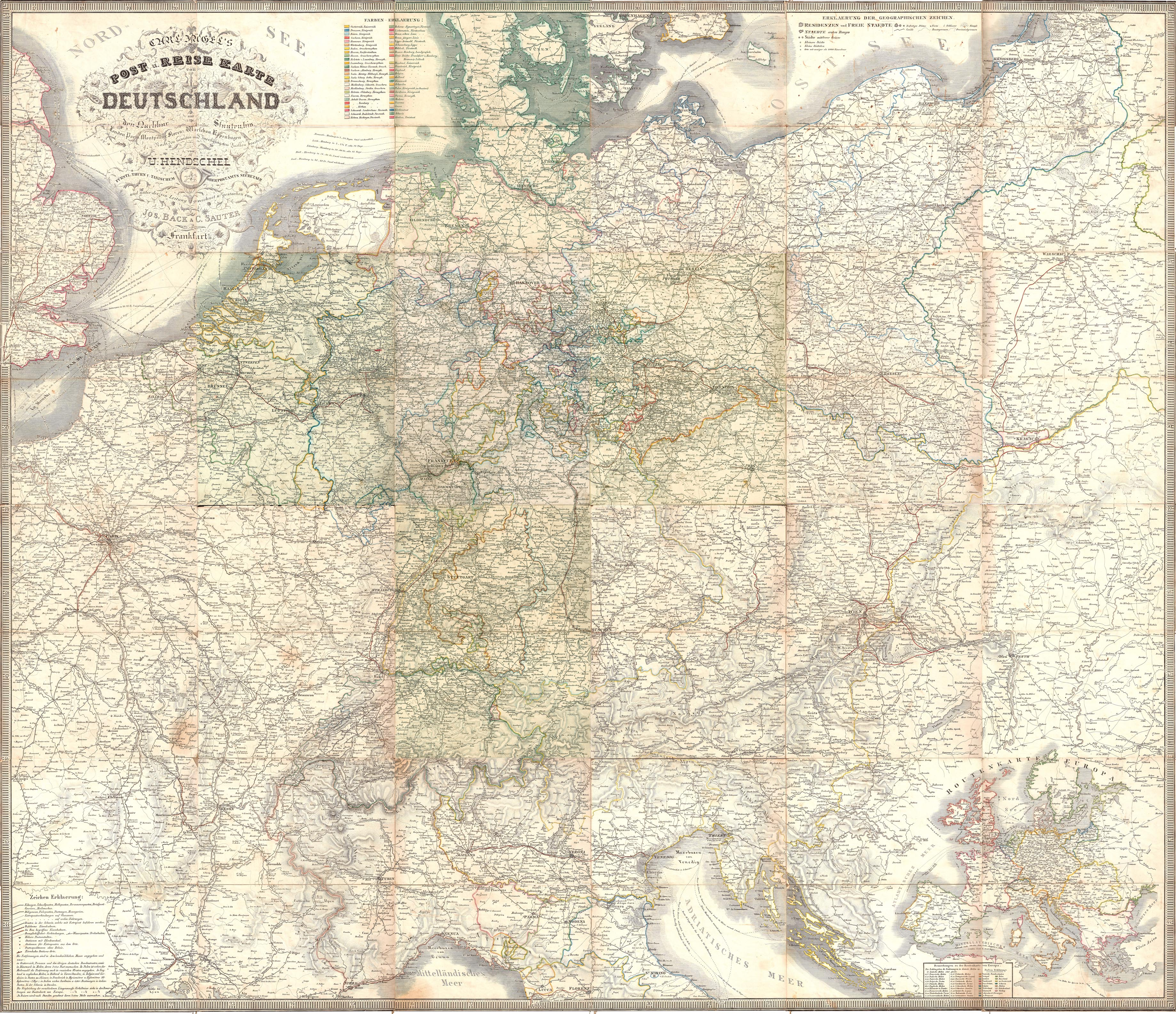
Carl Jügel's map of the postal and transportation networks in Germany, 1843

The Thurn-und-Taxis Post (German: [ˈtuːɐ̯n ʔʊnt ˈtaksɪs ˈpɔst]) was a private postal service and the successor to the Imperial Reichspost of the Holy Roman Empire. The Thurn-und-Taxis Post was operated by the Princely House of Thurn and Taxis between 1806 and 1867. The company was headquartered in Regensburg from its creation in 1806 until 1810 when it relocated to Frankfurt am Main where it remained until 1867.

== The end of the Imperial Reichspost ==
Throughout the course of the 16th century, the Taxis dynasty was entrusted as the imperial courier of the Holy Roman Empire and in the Spanish Netherlands, Spain, and Burgundy. In 1595, Leonhard I von Taxis was the empire's Postmaster General. Beginning in 1615, the office of Postmaster General of the Imperial Reichspost became hereditary under Lamoral I von Taxis. In 1650, the house was permitted with imperial authorization to rename itself from the House of Tassis (Taxis) to the House of Thurn and Taxis (from the French Tour et Taxis). It was able to maintain the Imperial Reichspost in competition with Europe's post offices.

Due to the 1792–1802 French Revolutionary Wars and the following 1803–15 Napoleonic Wars, the Imperial Reichspost gradually lost more and more postal districts during the tenure of Karl Anselm, 4th Prince of Thurn and Taxis, beginning with the Austrian Netherlands, thus depriving the post of important sources of revenue. Upon the death of Karl Anselm on 13 November 1805, the office of Postmaster General was inherited by his son, Karl Alexander, 5th Prince of Thurn and Taxis.

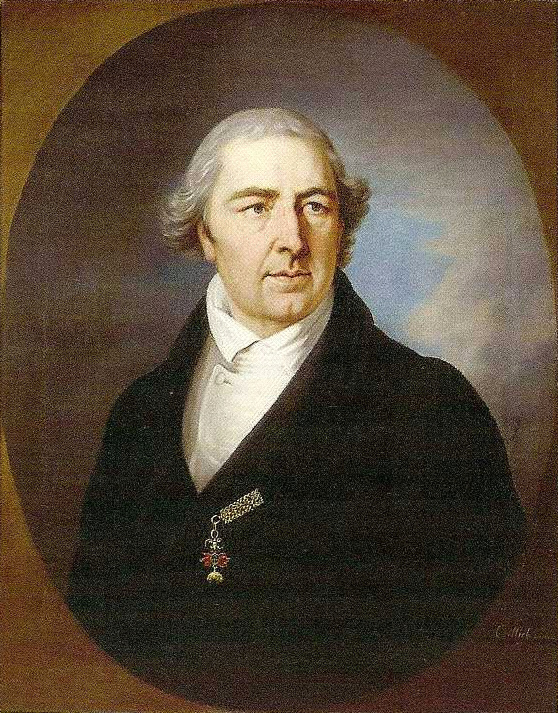
Karl Alexander, 5th Prince of Thurn and Taxis, 1827

After the Peace of Pressburg in December 1805, the operation of the Imperial Reichspost of the Holy Roman Empire was abolished in Württemberg, which then continued under government control. By contrast, Karl Alexander was granted the postal system in the Kingdom of Bavaria as a fiefdom of the House of Thurn and Taxis on 24 February 1806. On 2 May 1806, an agreement was signed between Karl Alexander and the Grand Duchy of Baden, also instituting its postal system as a fiefdom of the House of Thurn and Taxis.

The creation of the Confederation of the Rhine on 12 July 1806 virtually meant the end of the Holy Roman Empire and thus the end of the Imperial Reichspost and the hereditary office of Postmaster General held by the House of Thurn and Taxis. On 6 August 1806, Francis II, Holy Roman Emperor dissolved the empire after the disastrous defeat of the Third Coalition by Napoleon I of France at the Battle of Austerlitz.

While the Imperial Reichspost and the office of Postmaster General ceased to exist, Karl Alexander's wife Therese, Princess of Thurn and Taxis was instrumental in negotiating postal agreements with the Confederation of the Rhine and Napoleon, thus preserving the House of Thurn and Taxis postal monopoly as a private company.

Members of the Rothschild banking dynasty were involved in funding parts of the system in the last years of the Napoleonic Wars and the immediate years that followed.

== Thurn-und-Taxis Post ==
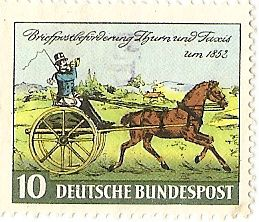
Deutsche Bundespost 1952 stamp depicting a Thurn-und-Taxis cariole

On 1 August 1808, the Kingdom of Bavaria placed the postal system under its government's control. The Grand Duchy of Baden followed suit on 2 August 1811. After Karl Theodor Anton Maria von Dalberg ceded Regensburg to Bavaria in 1810, the House of Thurn and Taxis relocated the headquarters of its postal operations to Frankfurt am Main. After the defeat and exile of Napoleon, the Congress of Vienna recognized the postal claims of the House of Thurn and Taxis in several member states of the German Confederation as legitimate. This recognition resulted in Article 17 of the German Federal Act of 8 June 1815 which required states that had established their own postal system, or intended to do so, to give the House of Thurn and Taxis fair compensation for its loss of revenue.

Under the German Federal Act, the postal systems of the Grand Duchy of Hesse, the duchies of Nassau, Saxe-Weimar, Saxe-Meiningen, and Saxe-Coburg and Gotha, the principalities of Reuss and Schwarzburg-Rudolstadt, the free cities of Frankfurt am Main, Hamburg, Bremen, and Lübeck, the principalities of Hohenzollern-Hechingen, Hohenzollern-Sigmaringen, Lippe-Detmold and Schaumburg-Lippe were placed under the now privately operated Thurn-und-Taxis Post. The seat of the post's headquarters in Frankfurt am Main was confirmed on 20 May 1816.

On 14 May 1816, Karl Alexander entered into a contract with William I, Elector of Hesse to operate the postal system of Hesse-Kassel. Prior to the contract, the Thurn-und-Taxis Post had a 23 January 1814 mutual transportation agreement with Hesse-Kassel's state postal system. On 27 July 1819, the Kingdom of Württemberg transferred the ownership and management of its state postal system to the Thurn-und-Taxis Post due to its inability to pay its compensation owed to the House of Thurn and Taxis.

== German-Austrian Postal Association ==
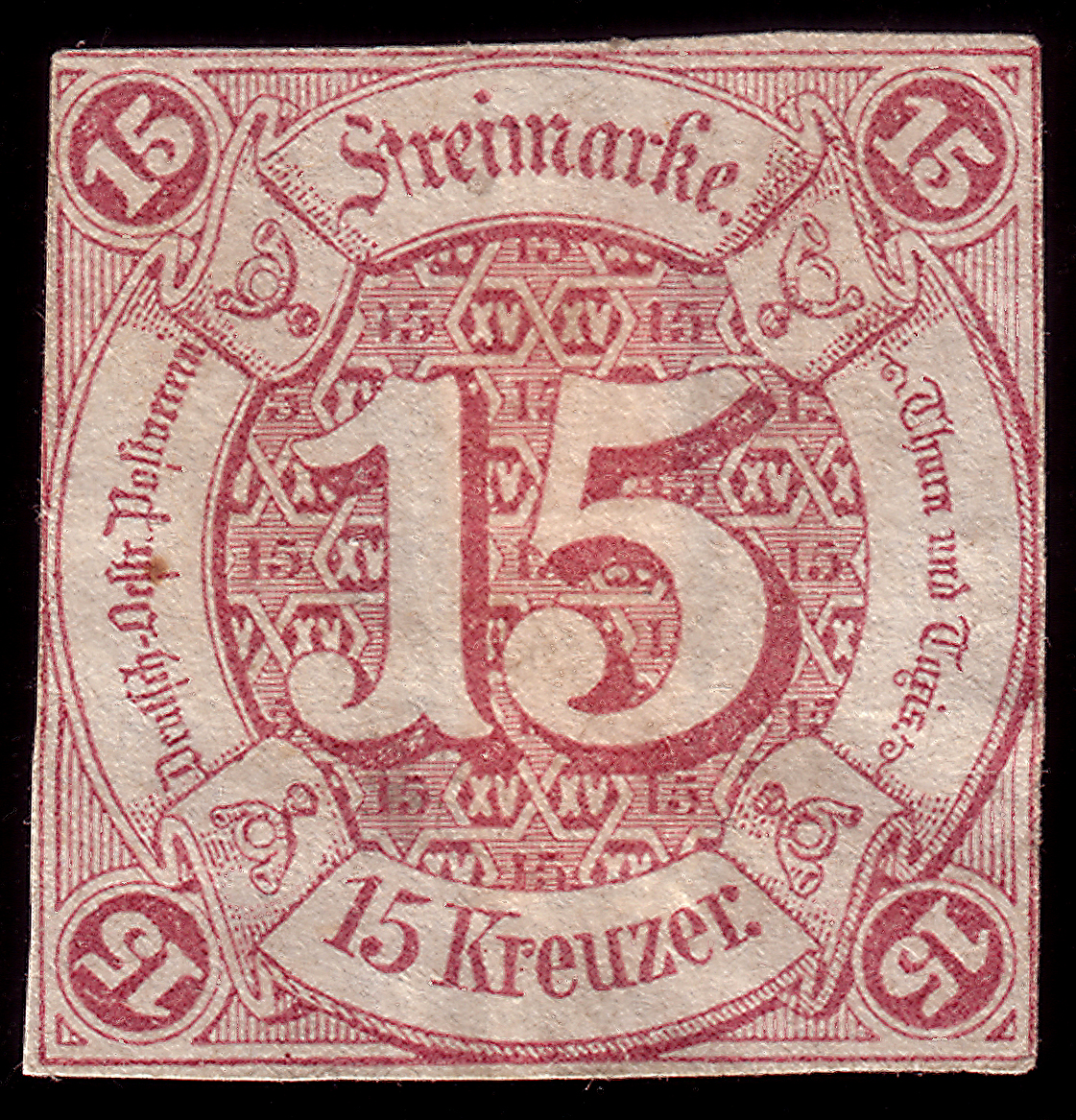
Thurn-und-Taxis Post's 1859 15 Kreuzer stamp

In 1847, a German postal conference met in Dresden which resulted in the establishment of the German-Austrian Postal Association. The association came into force on 1 July 1850. On 6 April 1850, the Thurn-und-Taxis Post joined the German-Austrian Postal Association, which was greeted with negative reactions from the government of the Kingdom of Prussia. Above all, Otto von Bismarck, as a representative to the German Confederation in Frankfurt am Main, disparaged it.

Beginning on 1 January 1852, the Thurn-und-Taxis Post postage stamp was available in two variants: Kreuzer and Groschen.

== The end of the Thurn-und-Taxis Post ==
After the Prussian victory in the Austro-Prussian War, the Prussians occupied the Free City of Frankfurt and the Thurn-und-Taxis Post's headquarters. The Thurn-und-Taxis Post transferred its postal system contracts to the Prussian state for the sum of three million Thaler after a contract was signed and ratified on 28 January 1867. The handover of control of the postal system took place on 1 July 1867. The last Post Director General of the Thurn-und-Taxis Post in Frankfurt was Eduard von Schele zu Schelenburg.

== See also ==
- The Crying of Lot 49
- Thurn und Taxis (board game)

== Literature ==
- Wolfgang Behringer: Thurn und Taxis. München 1990 ISBN 3-492-03336-9
- Martin Dallmeier: Quellen zur Geschichte des europäischen Postwesens. Kallmünz 1977
- Martin Dallmeier und Martha Schad, Das fürstliche Haus Thurn und Taxis, 300 Jahre Geschichte in Bildern, Verlag Pustet, Regensburg 1996 ISBN 3-7917-1492-9
- Ludwig Kalmus: Weltgeschichte der Post. Wien 1937
- Max Piendl: Das fürstliche Haus Thurn und Taxis. Regensburg 1980
- Ernst-Otto Simon, In: Archiv für deutsche Postgeschichte. 1/90, S.14–41
- Heinrich von Stephan: Geschichte der Preußischen Post, Berlin 1859, Reprint Heidelberg 1987
