= Wande (river) =

River in Germany

Location
- Country: Germany
- State: Hesse

Physical characteristics
- Mouth
  - location: Twiste
  - coordinates: 51.4214°N 9.1201°E
- Length: 12.4 km (7.7 mi)

Basin features
- Progression: Twiste→ Diemel→ Weser→ North Sea

The Wande is a river of Hesse, Germany. It flows into the Twiste's left-bank near Volkmarsen.

== See also ==
- List of rivers of Hesse
