= Schelenburg =

Water castle in Lower Saxony, Germany

Coordinates: 52.2830°N 8.2266°E

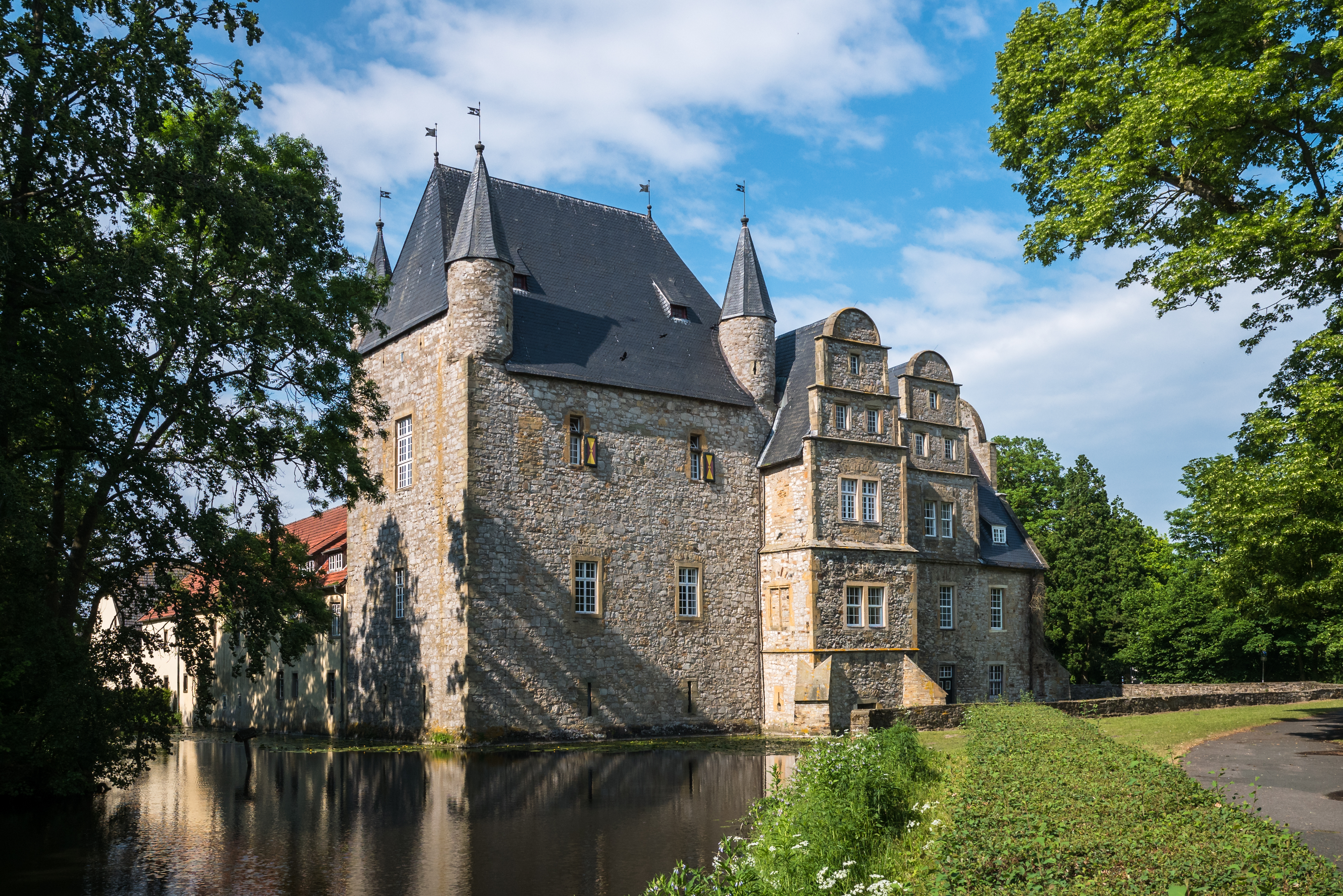
Schelenburg water castle

Schelenburg castle is a water castle in Schledehausen, municipality of Bissendorf, Lower Saxony, Germany.

Built in the Weser Renaissance style, it is one of the oldest castles of the Osnabrücker Land.

== History ==
The castle was first mentioned in 1160, but is estimated to date back to the 11th century. Its oldest part is the Gothic residential tower from the 12th century. In the Middle Ages it was surrounded by water all around and could only be reached via a ladder to the first floor. A chapel room in the tower is mentioned in 1578. The 1st floor served as a Protestant church between 1650 and 1803. As a result, the floor of the second floor was removed in the 18th century and galleries were installed instead. In the 19th century, these measures were reversed, a new floor was installed and partition walls were added on the 1st floor.

The castle was the ancestral home of the noble lords of Sledesen until the end of the 14th century. In 1396 the castle passed to the von Schele family after Rabodus III von Schele married his heir daughter Elisabeth von Schledenhausen. Since then, the castle has remained in the family, and the forestry property is now managed by Joachim Kellermann von Schele.

In 1490 a fire destroyed residential and commercial buildings, but the massive residential tower was spared. From around 1500 to 1532, a Renaissance building made of quarry sandstone was built on the foundations of the burned-out house. The well-known southern German builder Jörg Unkair completed the building in the Weser Renaissance style. The moats around the tower were finally filled in. The west wing was built in 1573 as a commercial building using the foundations of a previous building. In 1703 it was extended and the north wing that had existed until then was demolished. The northern main moat was filled and a new north wing was built. The eastern castle wall with gatehouse was converted into a gate wing with living rooms. In 1801 the castle courtyard was enlarged again to the north.

The reformer Caspar von Schele (1525–1578) died at Schelenburg.

The Prime Minister of the Kingdom of Hanover, Eduard von Schele zu Schelenburg, was born at Schelenburg Castle in 1805.

== Famous people ==
- Eduard von Schele zu Schelenburg

== Bibliography ==
- Römisch-Germanisches Zentralmuseum (ed.): Führer zu vor- und frühgeschichtlichen Denkmälern - Das Osnabrücker Land III, vol. 44, Verlag Philipp von Zabern, Mainz 1979, ISBN 3-8053-0313-0
- Gabriele Brasse: Schloß Schelenburg (Schnell, Kunstführer No. 1898). Munich/Zurich 1992
- Ernst Andreas Friedrich: Die Schelenburg bei Osnabrück, pages 150–152, in: Wenn Steine reden könnten, vol. III, Landbuch-Verlag, Hannover 1995, ISBN 3-7842-0515-1.
