= Twiste (Diemel) =

River in Hesse, Germany

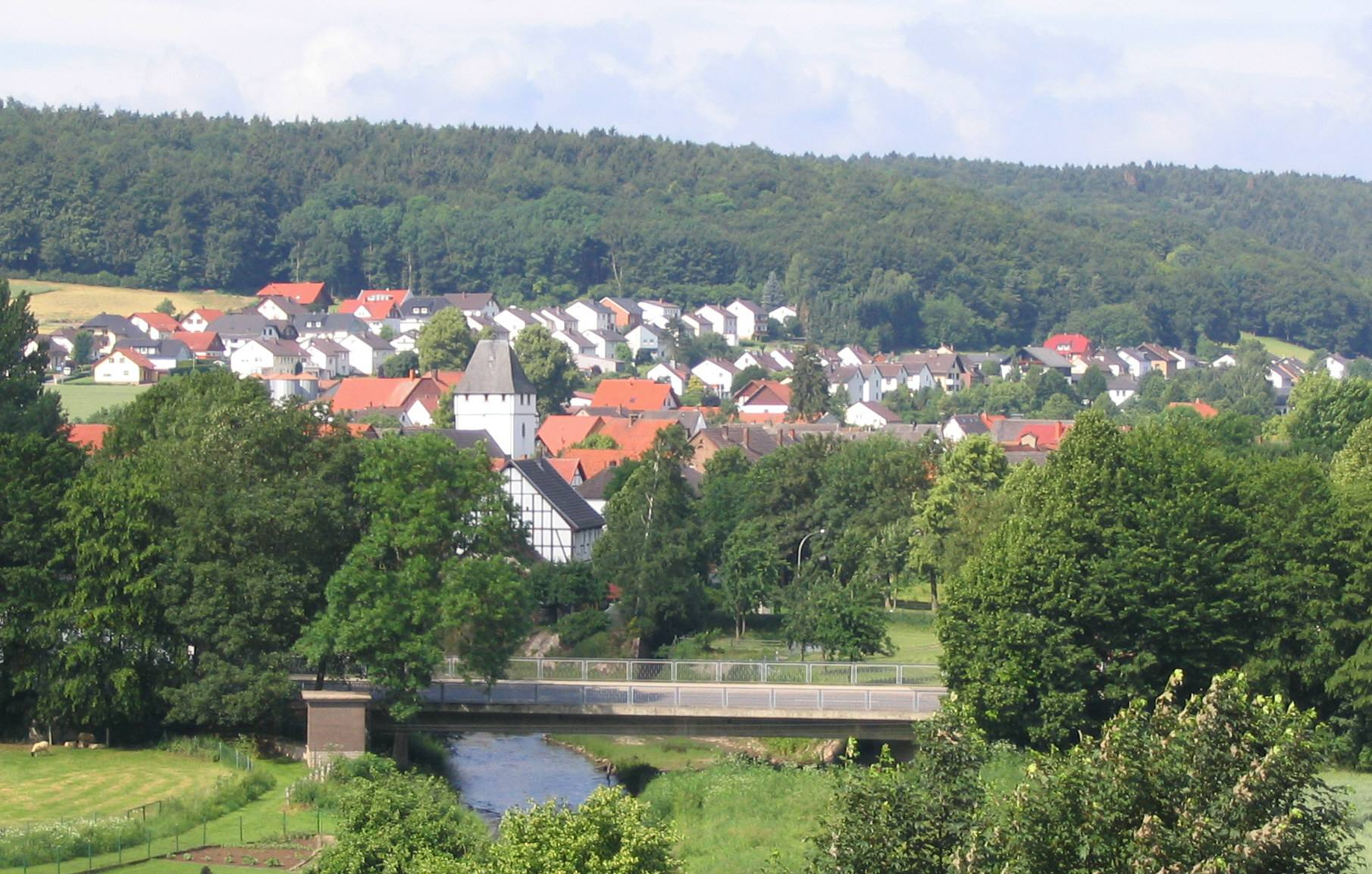

Location
- Country: Germany
- States: Hesse; North Rhine-Westphalia

Physical characteristics
- Mouth
  - location: Diemel
  - coordinates: 51.4824°N 9.1473°E
- Length: 40.8 km (25.4 mi)
- Basin size: 447 km^{2} (173 sq mi)

Basin features
- Progression: Diemel→ Weser→ North Sea

The Twiste (German pronunciation: [ˈtvɪstə]) is a river of Hesse and of North Rhine-Westphalia, Germany. It is the most important tributary of the Diemel, which it joins in Warburg. Its largest tributaries are the Erpe, Watter, Aar and Wande.

The Twistesee reservoir, in the county of Waldeck-Frankenberg in North Hesse, impounds the Twiste.

== See also ==
- List of rivers of Hesse
- List of rivers of North Rhine-Westphalia
