= Erpe (Twiste) =

River in Germany

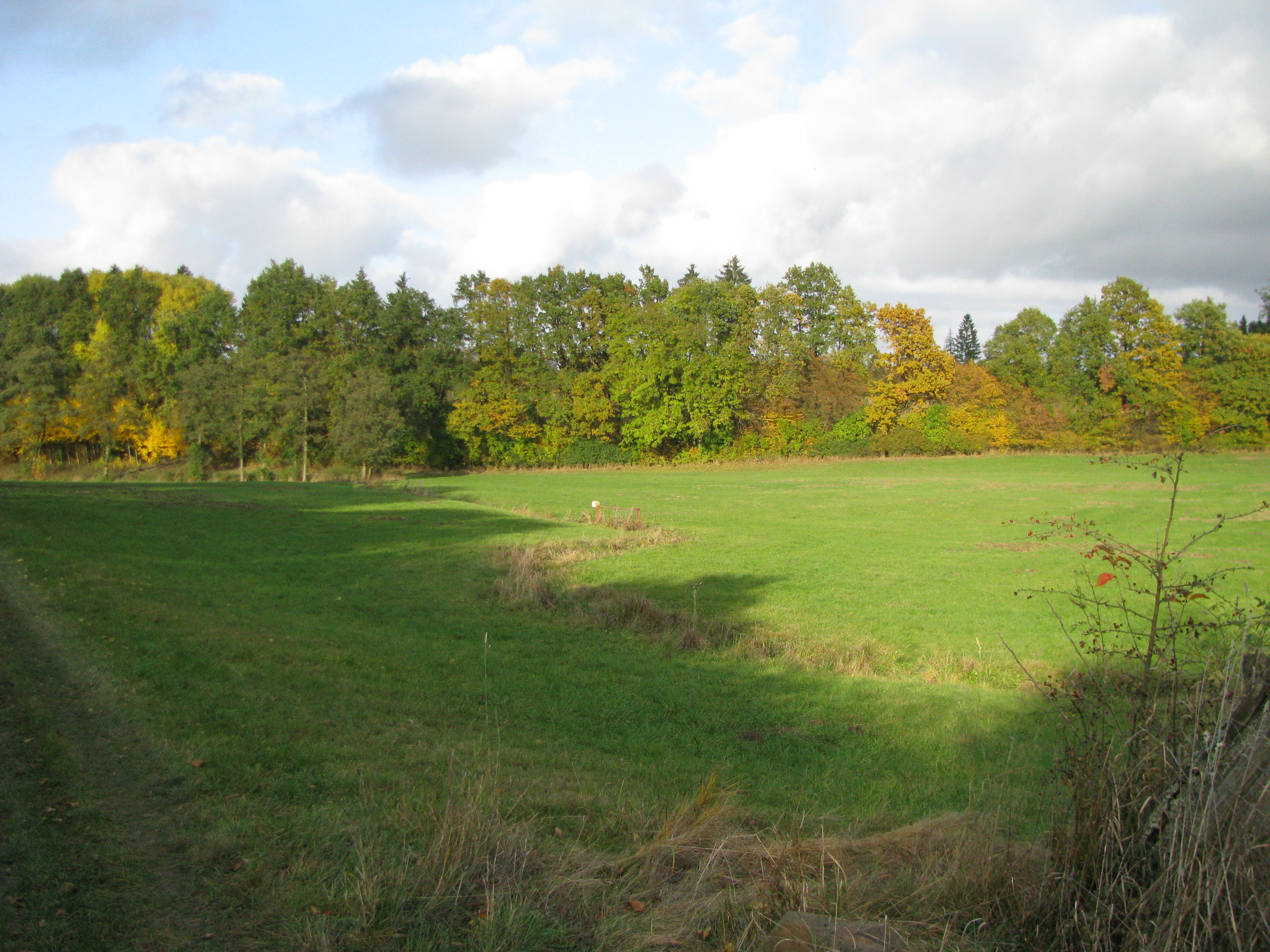

Location
- Country: Germany
- State: Hesse

Physical characteristics
- Mouth
  - location: Twiste
  - coordinates: 51.4222°N 9.1204°E
- Length: 26.0 km (16.2 mi)

Basin features
- Progression: Twiste→ Diemel→ Weser→ North Sea

The Erpe is a river of Hesse, Germany. It flows into the Twiste near Volkmarsen.

== See also ==
- List of rivers of Hesse
