= Wildenberg Castle (Kirchzell) =

Castle in Germany

- Wildenburg
- Kirchzell-Preunschen
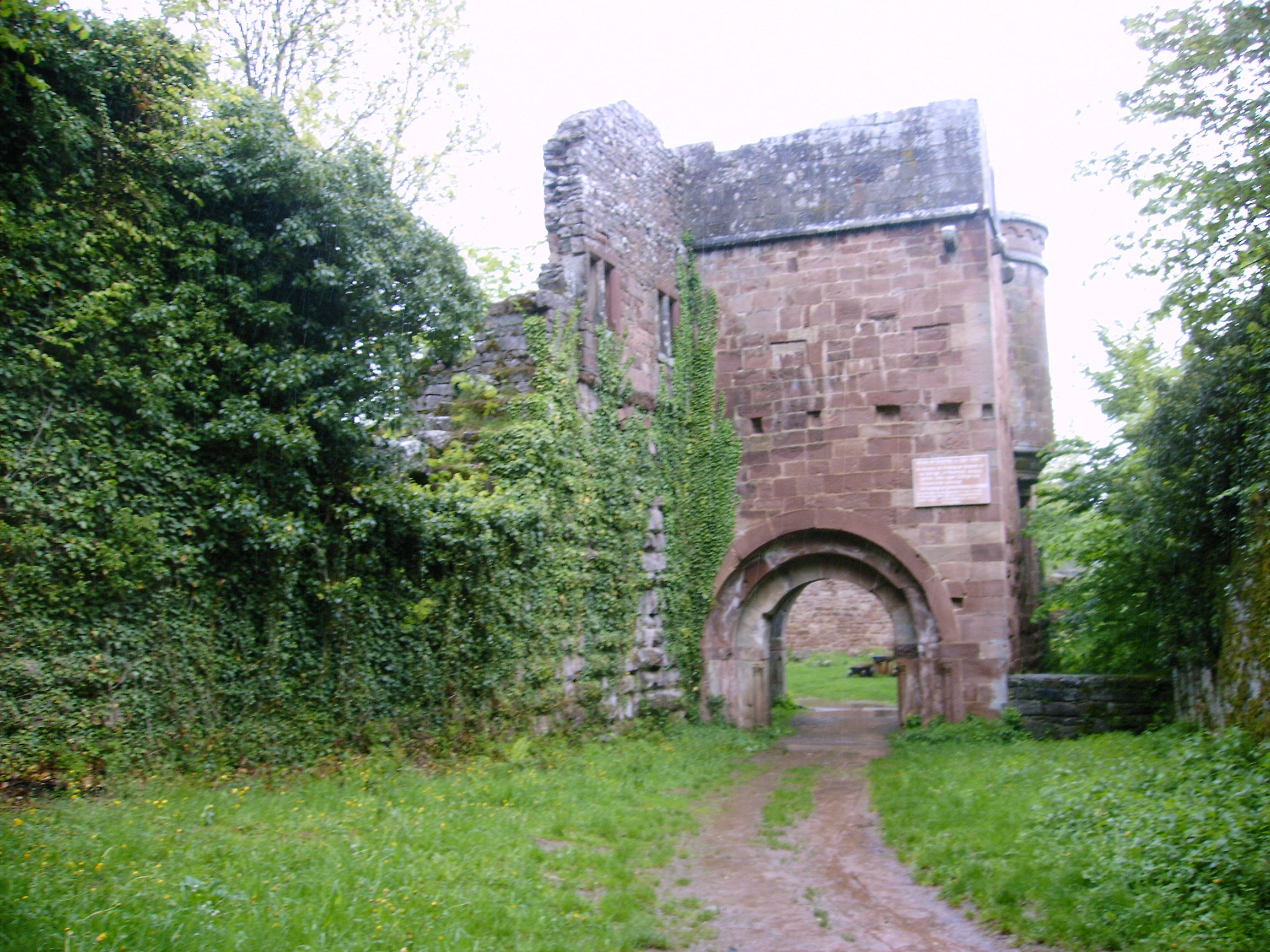
- Wildenberg Castle - gate tower

Site information
- Type: hill castle, spur castle
- Code: DE-BY
- Condition: ruin

Location
- Coordinates: 49°35′46.68″N 9°11′43.44″E
- Height: 365.2 m above sea level (NN)

Site history
- Built: c. 1200

Wildenberg Castle (German: Burg Wildenberg), also called the Wildenburg, is a ruined, Hohenstaufen period castle in the Odenwald hills in Germany. It is located in the parish of Preunschen in the municipality of Kirchzell, in the Lower Franconian district of Miltenberg in Bavaria.

== Location ==
The ruins of the hill castle lie on a northeast-projecting hill spur, the Schlossberg, at a height of 365.2 m above sea level (NN) above the valley of the Mud, three kilometres southeast of Kirchzell and only a few hundred metres northeast of the centre of Preunschen, about 13 kilometres southwest of the district town of Miltenberg.

== History ==
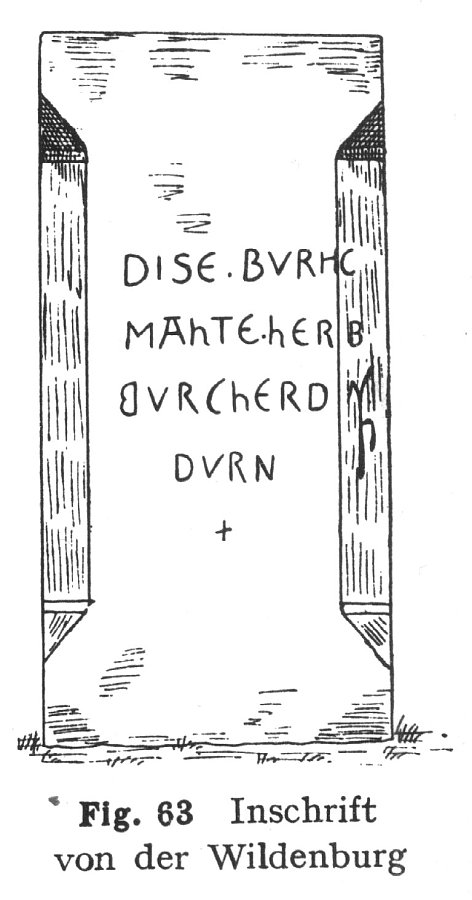
Inscription naming the lords who had the castle built

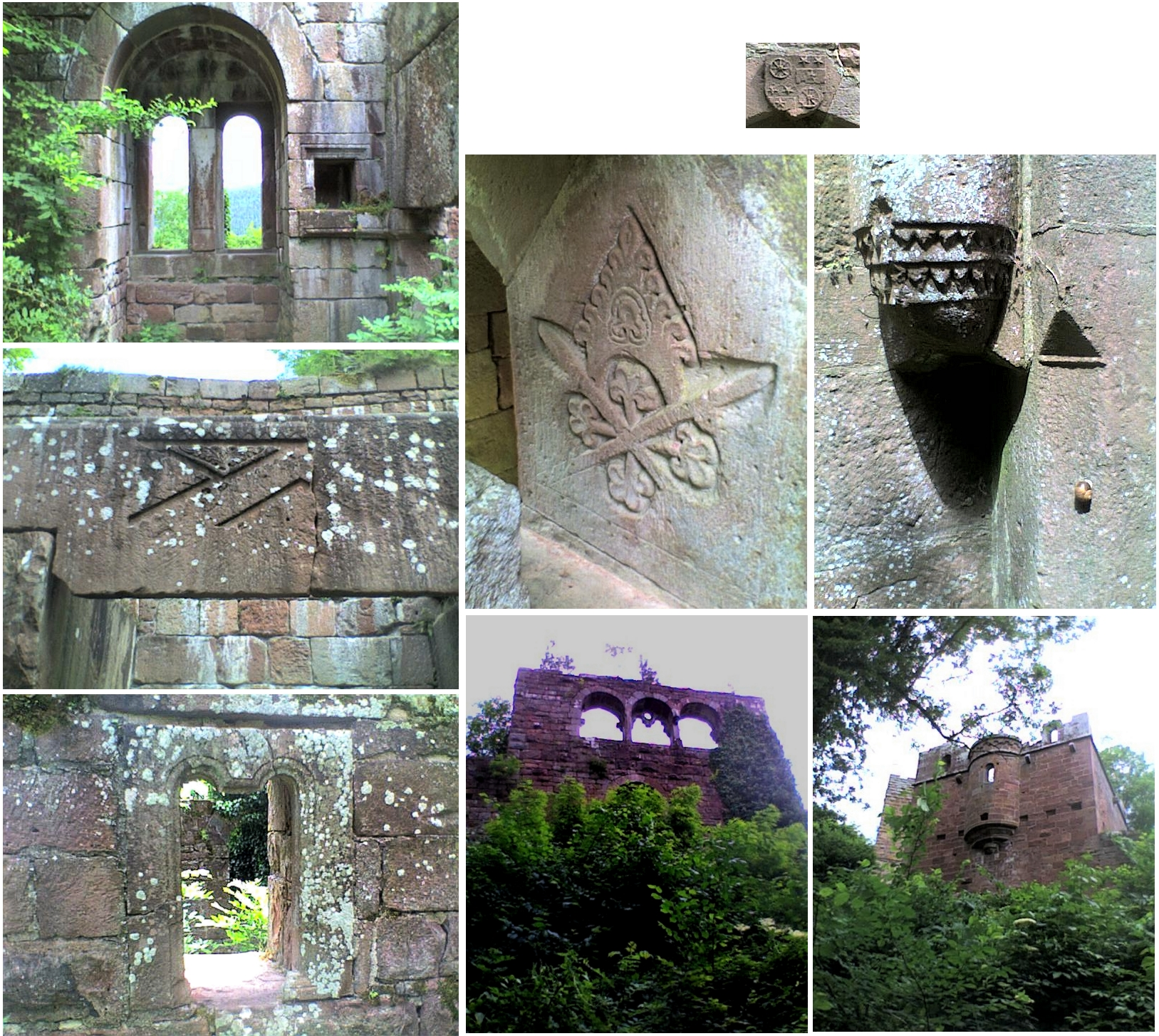
Photo collage of views, window arches and ornaments

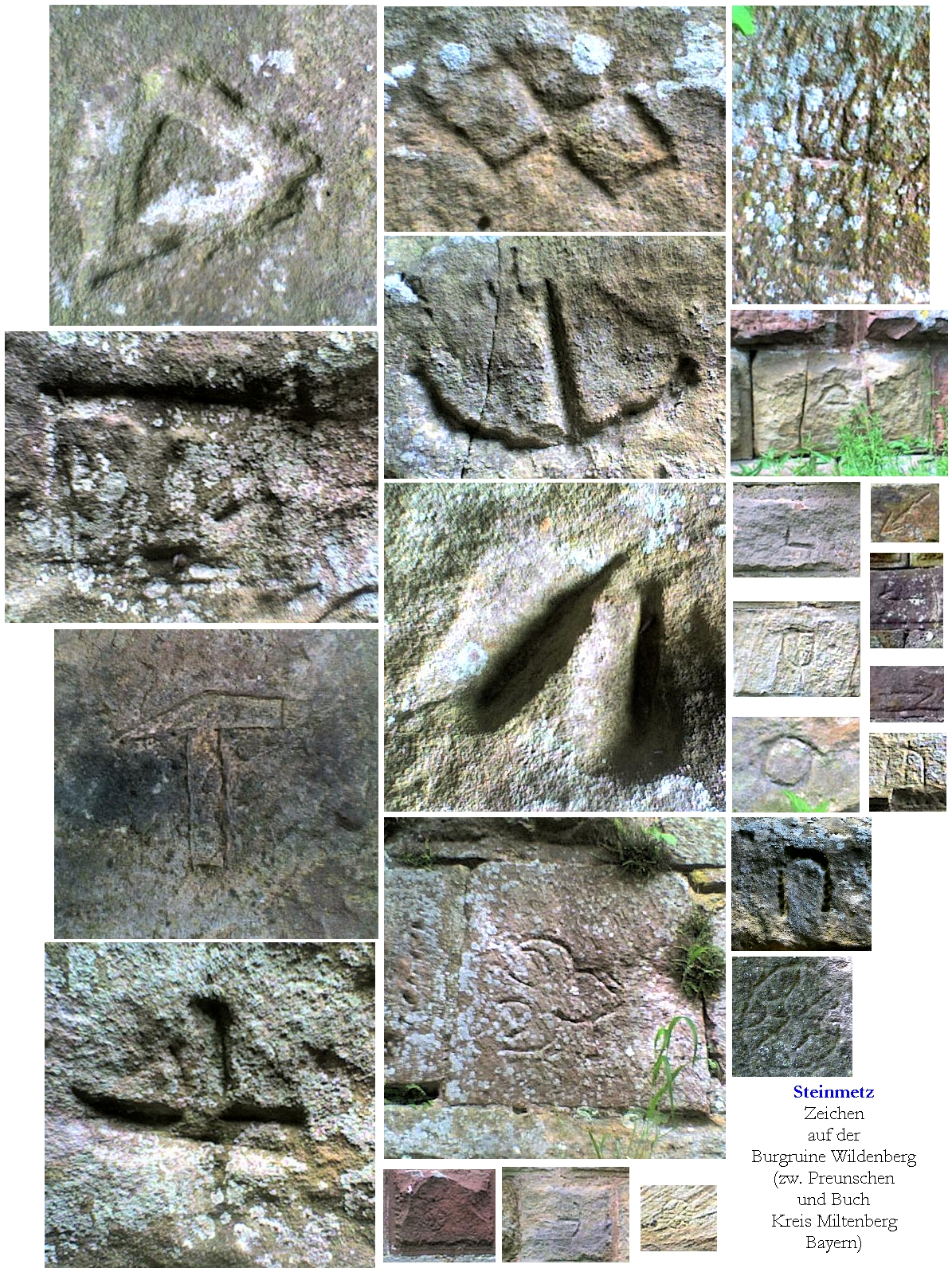
The variety of mason's marks

The lords of Dürn, meritorious members of the retinue of the Hohenstaufen emperor and Schutzvögte of Amorbach Abbey, had the castle built sometime between 1180 and around 1200. According to the Amorbach Abbey chronicles, however, his grandson Conrad I of Dürn (died 1258) started construction in 1216. This probably just refers, however, to the construction of the gate tower.

In 1271 and 1272 parts of the castle were sold, due to the Dürn's financial difficulties to the Archbishopric of Mainz and later to the Amt of the Mainz government, after the Barony of Walldürn had been purchased in its entirety in 1292 by Mainz. Its management was initially exercised by officiates (Offiziate), but later by a vogt or burgrave. In 1291, a certain Henry was the officiate, around 1320 it was Conrad Rüdt of Collenberg. In 1337 Archbishop Henry reconciled with his cathedral chapter and signed over Wildenberg Castle to the canons for a short period. In 1350 the Amt of the castle was enfeoffed to Eberhard of Rosenberg. In 1354 Conrad Rüdt of Collenberg redeemed the fief. By increasing his borrowings from the Archbishop of Mainz, Conrad also received the offices of Walldürn and Buchen. In 1356 an earthquake is said to have seriously damaged the castle. In January that year Archbishop Gerlach enfeoffed the castle of Wildenburg, the town Amorbach and a free tenancy in Miltenberg, without the consent of his cathedral chapter, to Engelhard of Hirschhorn. One year later, he lent money to his Wildeburg burgrave, Conrad Rüdt of Collenberg.

From 1368 Wiprecht of Dürn, Eberhardt Rüdt of Bödigheim, Fritz of Dürn and Eberhard of Fechenbach were the Mainz castellans. In the later period up to the 15th century, members of these families were mentioned as Amtmänner.

In the years 1400 to 1511 the castle was extended in a late medieval style. The west tower and barrier wall through the castle courtyard were built, and the castle chapel renovated.

Until 1525, the castle was still the headquarters of a Mainz Amtmann for the Amt Amorbach. In the German Peasants' War, peasants from the Heller Haufen led by the knight Götz of Berlichingen razed Wildenberg Castle on 4 May 1525. Since then, it has been a ruin.

In 1803, as part of the process of secularization, the castle was seized by the Principality of Leiningen for a short time. In 1806, the Principality of Leiningen was mediatised by the Grand Duchy of Baden. By 1810 the castle and the area around Amorbach became part of the Grand Duchy of Hesse-Darmstadt and, in 1816, was transferred to the Kingdom of Bavaria in an exchange of territory.

Parts of the castle were used in the 19th century to build the artificial ruins of Eulbach Park.

Today, the castle ruins are a popular hiking destination and occasionally used for cultural events.

== Description ==
In essence, the approximately rectangular, 80-metre-long, Hohenstaufen period inner ward has survived, having been little altered over the centuries. A diagonally oriented bergfried stands on the uphill side. On the south side is a gate tower with a stepped portal and a castle chapel with bay window on the upper storey of the apse. The spacious palas is situated on the downhill side of the castle. Its window arches on the upper floor, which are comparable to those of the imperial palace of Gelnhausen and Château de Guirbaden in Alsace, are of high artistic value.

The partition wall in the middle of the courtyard is a post-Hohenstaufen addition. That apart, there have been hardly any structural changes to the castle over the years, which is why Wildenberg, despite its ruinous state, is regarded as one of the best preserved Hohenstaufen castles in Southern Germany.

The castle is rich in various mason's marks (at least 50 different ones have been found), some of which are also found on other castles of the Rhine-Main-Neckar region, e.g. Stolzeneck Castle on the River Neckar and also in the palace at Gelnhausen.

The castle is situated at the beginning of the spur ridge south-west of Preunschen. A few metres above the castle is the Fels(en)burg ("Rock Castle"), a cave hewn out of a natural, rock formation, with a rectangular stone entrance portal. The rock was hewn and the stone slabs so arranged to form a flat platform above. It may be conjectured that this was designed as a sort of outer ward to protect the spur side, but that has not been proven.

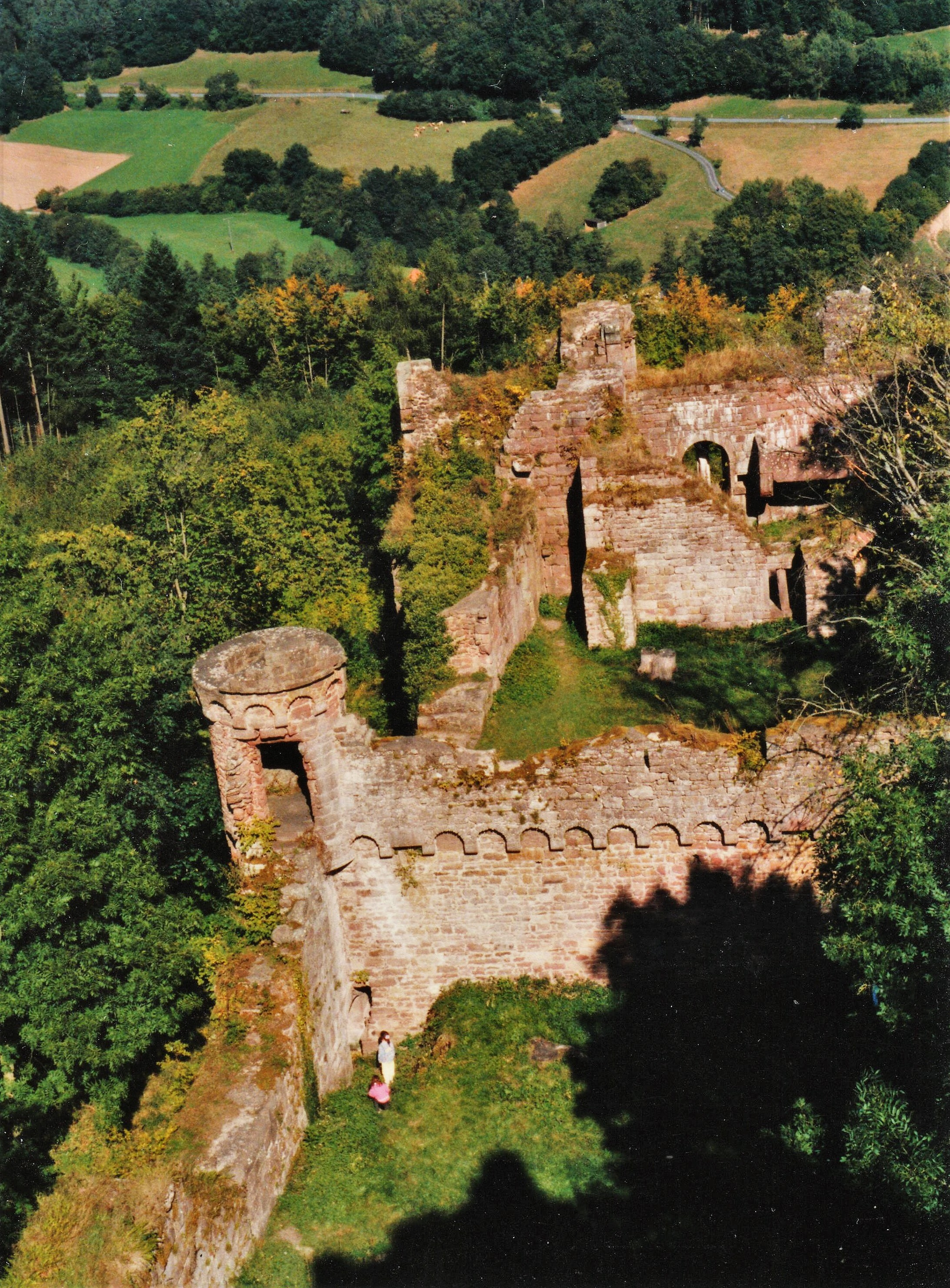
The northern flank of the castle

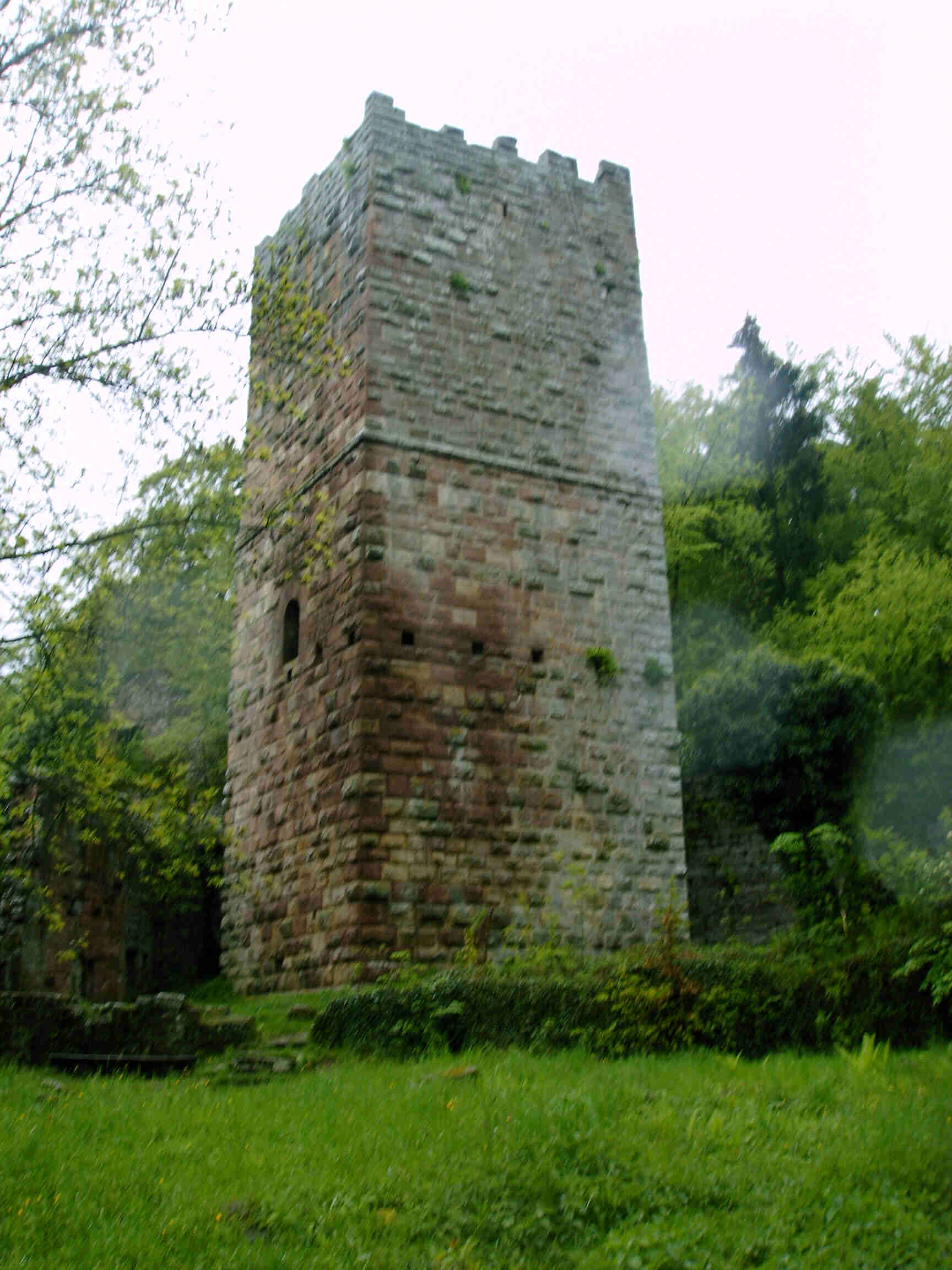
The bergfried

== Parzival ==
Wildenberg Castle is possibly the castle that is called Montsalvaesch in Wolfram von Eschenbach's Parzival, and depending on its linguistic origin is interpreted as Heilsberg ("Salvation Hill" or "Holy Hill") or wilder Berg ("Wild Hill") (cf. section 230, verse 13). In the fifth book (Die Gralsburg) the Wildenberg is specifically mentioned: "Who saw such a great fire/Here by us in Wildenberg?" It is possible therefore that Wolfram von Eschenbach wrote part of the novel here. However, other castles may also have been suggested as the subject. Wolfram von Eschenbach may have written his description of the holy hill just based on contemporary paradise literature.

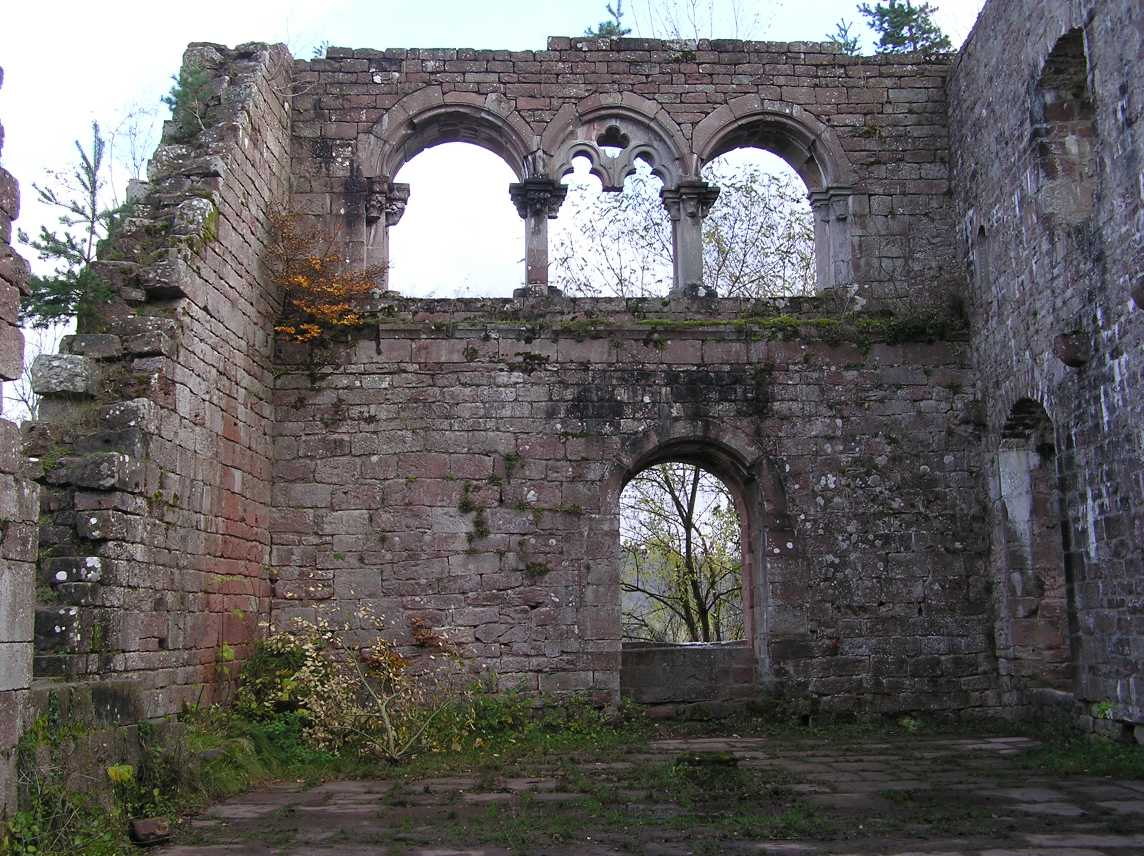
Palas and window arcades (Fensterarkaden)

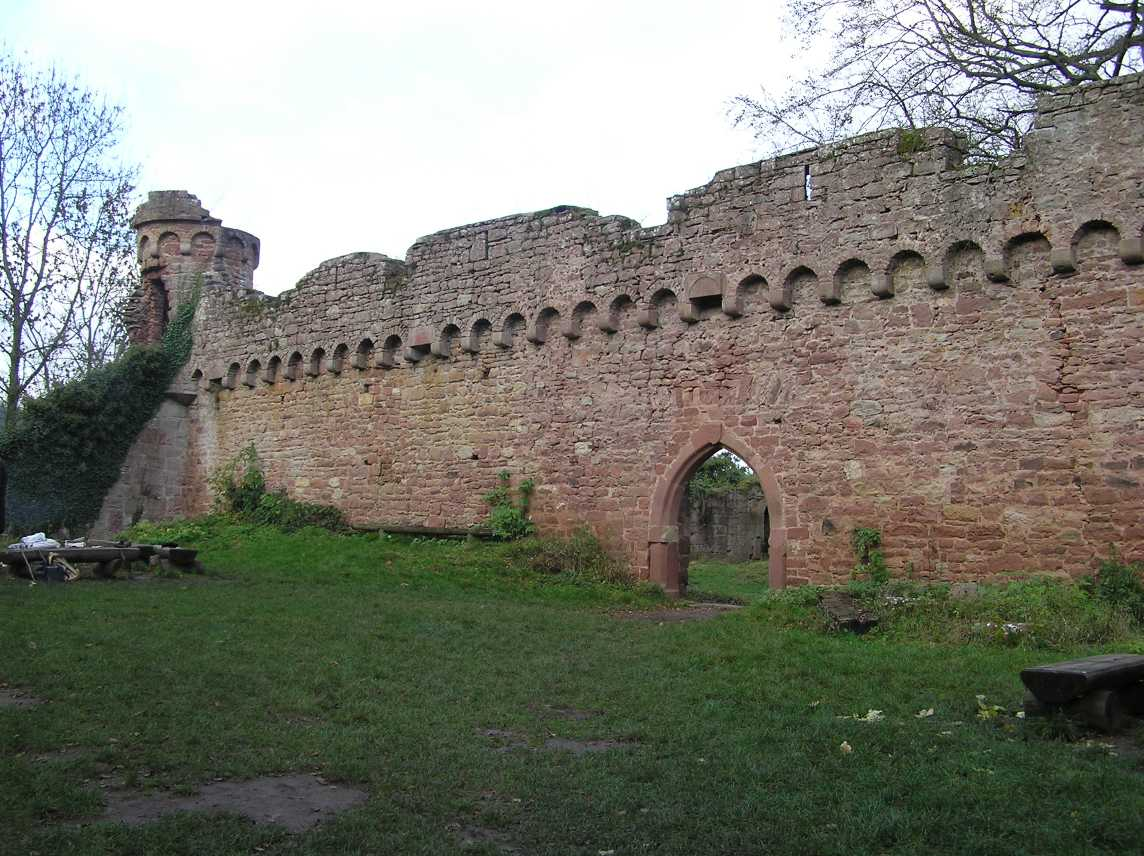
Late medieval dividing wall

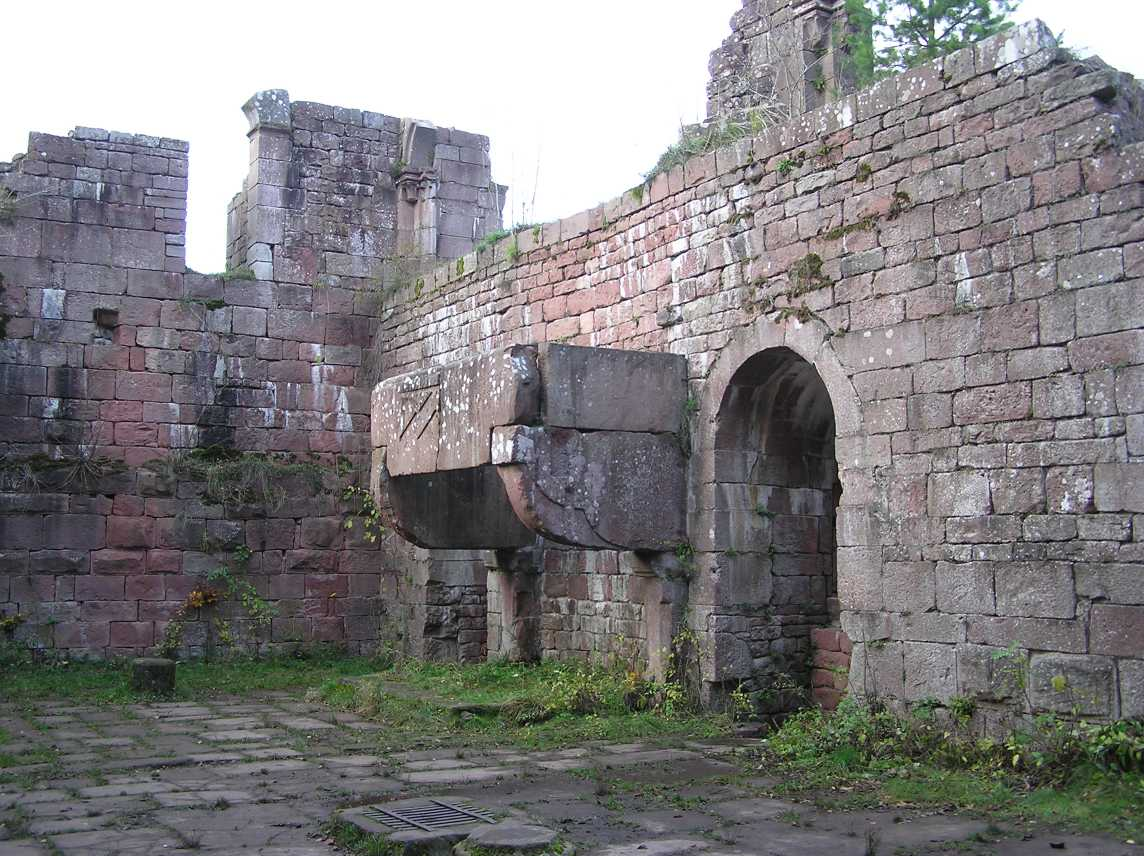
Renovated fireplace of the palas

== Literature ==
- Alexander Antonow: Burgen im Main-Viereck. Breuberg, Freudenberg, Miltenberg, Prozelten, Rothenfels, Wertheim, Wildenberg. Antonow, Frankfurt am Main, 1987, ISBN 3-924086-30-3, pp. 111–126 (Handbuchreihe Historische Bauten 1).
- Thomas Biller: Burgen und Schlösser im Odenwald - Ein Führer zu Geschichte und Architektur. 1. Auflage. Verlag Schnell und Steiner, Regensburg, 2005, ISBN 3-7954-1711-2, pp. 151–157.
- Günther Ebersold: Wildenberg und Munsalvaesche - Auf den Spuren eines Symbols . Peter Lang Verlag, 1988, ISBN 3-631-40393-3, pp. 64–83.
- Walter Hotz: Wildenberg - Entstehung und Gestalt einer staufischen Burg. Verlag Hermann Emig, Amorbach, 1979.
- Walter Hotz: Burgen der Hohenstaufenzeit im Odenwaldraum. In: Winfried Wackerfuß (ed.): Beiträge zur Erforschung des Odenwalds und seiner Randlandschaften II. Festschrift für Hans H. Weber. Breuberg-Bund, Breuberg-Neustadt, 1977, pp. 155–168, esp. pp. 158f. & 162.
- Hans Kunis: Wildenberg - Die Gralsburg im Odenwald. Verlegt bei M. Schäfer, Leipzig, ca. 1935.
- Tilman Mittelstrass: Die Ritter und Edelknechte von Hettingen, Hainstadt, Buchen und Dürn. Heft 26 der Reihe Zwischen Neckar und Main. Verein Bezirksmuseum Buchen, 1991.
- Ursula Pfistermeister: Wehrhaftes Franken. Band 2: Burgen, Kirchenburgen, Stadtmauern um Würzburg. Verlag Hans Carl, Nuremberg, 2001, ISBN 3-418-00386-9, pp. 97–99.
- Thomas Steinmetz: Burgen im Odenwald. Brensbach, 1998, ISBN 3-931529-02-9.
