= Celle Castle =

German castle/palace in Lower Saxony

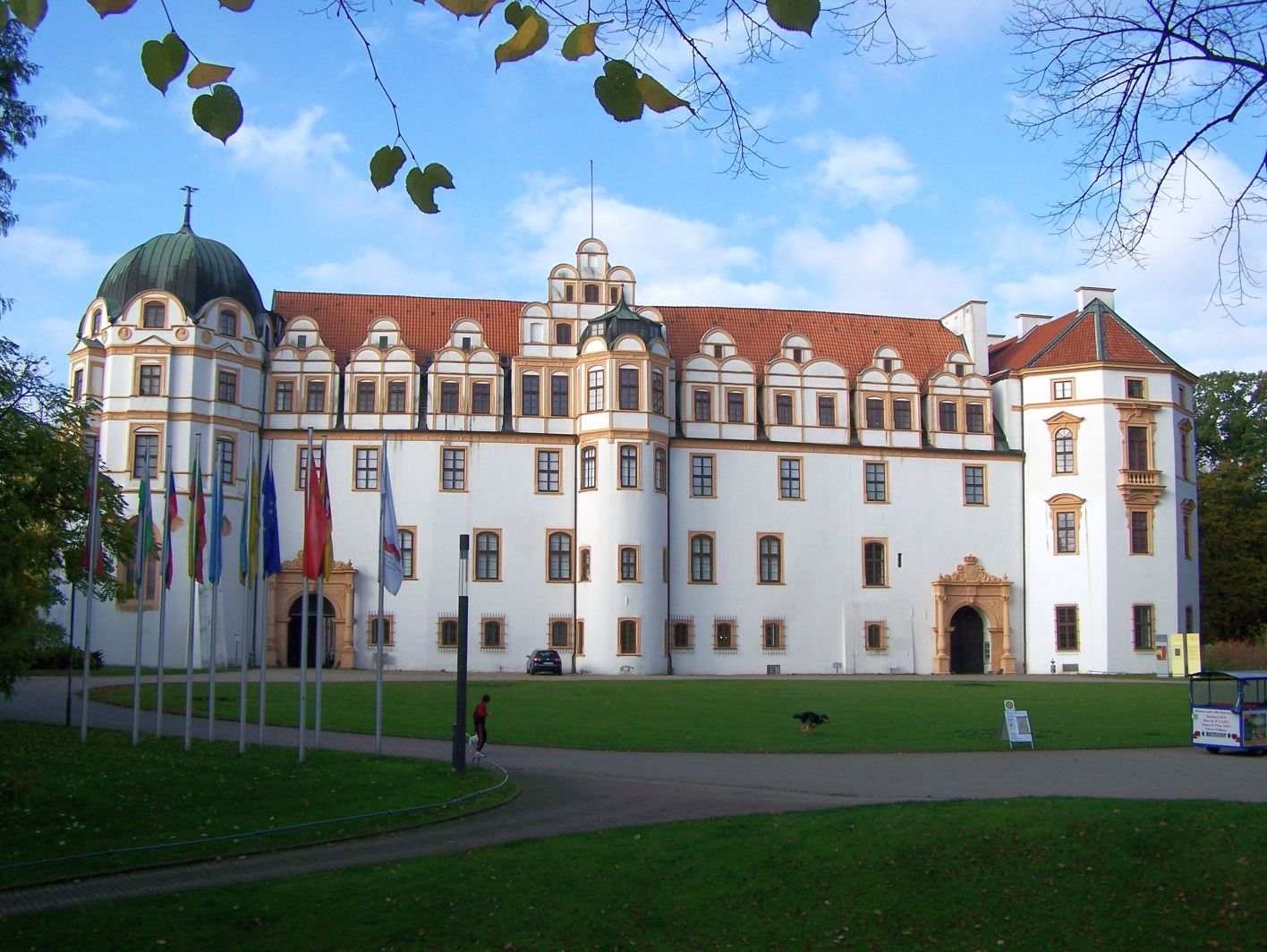
- The facade of the castle which looks onto Celle's Altstadt

- Location within Lower Saxony Location within Germany

General information
- Architectural style: Renaissance architecture
- Location: Celle, Lower Saxony, Germany
- Coordinates: 52°37′26″N 10°04′39″E
- Construction started: 980 AD

Celle Castle (German: Schloss Celle) or, less commonly, Celle Palace, in the German town of Celle in Lower Saxony, was one of the residences of the House of Brunswick-Lüneburg. This quadrangular building is the largest castle in the southern Lüneburg Heath region.

== History ==
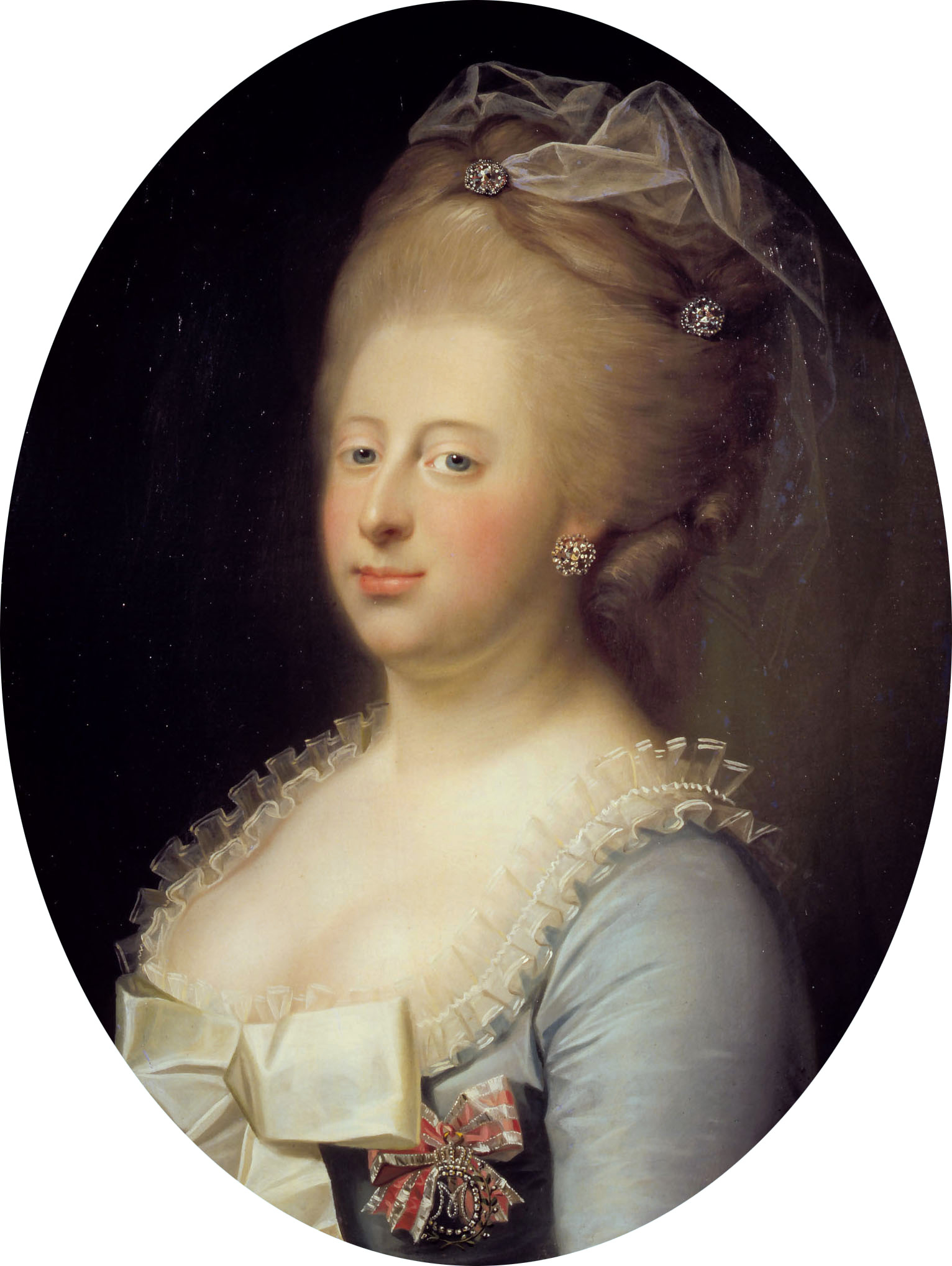
Caroline Matilda, who was banished and lived in Celle Castle; 1771 painting

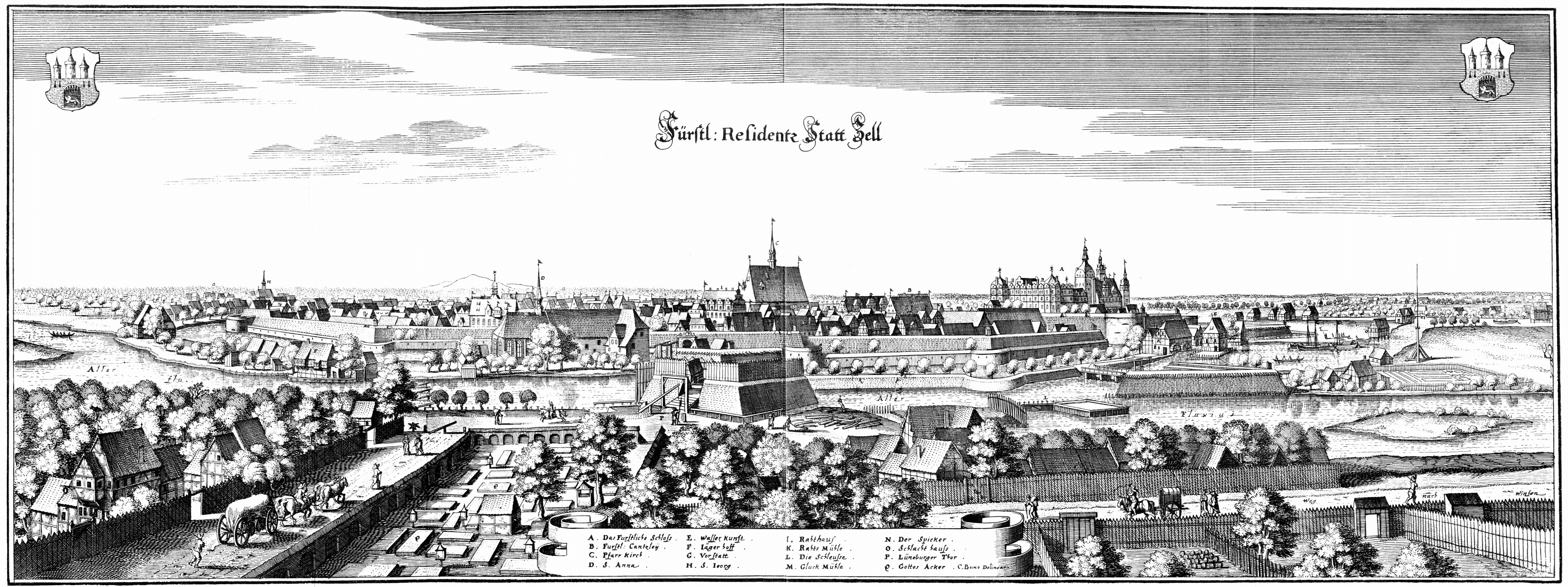
Celle with its castle (right) in an engraving by Matthäus Merian, 1654

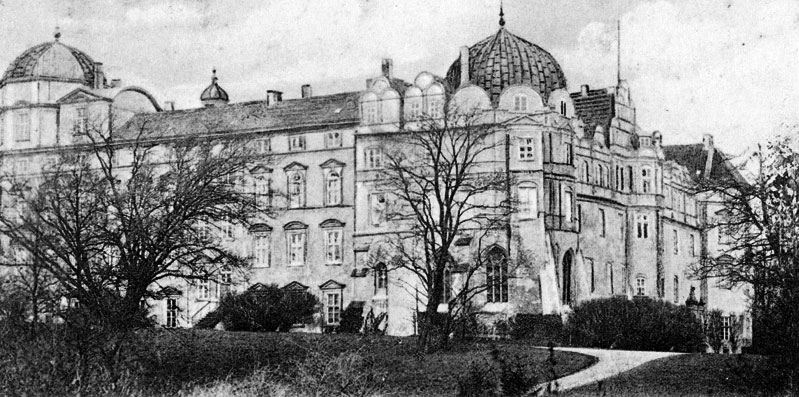
Celle Castle 1904

Celle Castle is based on a fortified wall tower (Wehrturm) with the character of a water castle, which guarded a ford over the River Aller. This first fortification, called Kellu, was built by a Brunonen count around 980 AD. Another forerunner of the castle, which may have been an extension of the wall tower, was founded in 1292 by Otto the Strict. The cellar vault and the lower stories of the watch tower have survived to the present day. Its ruins lie underneath the castle theatre. Around 1315 the actual Castrum Celle was first recorded. As a consequence of the War of the Lüneburg Succession, in 1378 the Dukes of Brunswick-Lüneburg moved their Residenz from Lüneburg to Celle and began transforming the Burg, now encircled by ditches and embankments, into a Schloss. About a century later the castle was further expanded by Frederick the Pious from 1471 to 1478, and the castle chapel was consecrated in 1485. Ernest I the Confessor had the castle decorated from 1530 in the Renaissance style. At the same time, between 1520 and 1560, the defences, in the form of ramparts and bastions, were pushed further out. At this time the castle was typical of its era, a quadrangular building with a rectangular courtyard, massive corner towers, a large main tower and characteristic features of Weser Renaissance.

From 1670 onwards alterations to the castle were carried out by Duke George William, which were intended to transform the old renaissance seat into a contemporary Residenz. George William was keen on building, typical of the princes of his time, and made further changes that were intended to recall his time in Italy. The façades, which were copied from Venetian buildings, were then given their present-day appearance. Notable features include the corona of gables that encircles the roofs, and the unusual shape of the domed towers. The addition of the castle theatre and the Baroque state rooms stem from this period.

On the death of George William in 1705 the absolute rule of the dukes ended. The Principality of Lüneburg subsequently passed, along with the Principality of Calenberg, to the Kingdom of Hanover. The castle lost its political significance and stood empty again for a long time. From 1772 it was occupied by the British-born Danish queen, Caroline Matilda, the daughter of Frederick Lewis, Prince of Wales, who had been banished to Celle as a result of her affair with Johann Friedrich Struensee of Copenhagen. The unhappy queen only lived at the Celle court until 1775, when she died at a relatively young age of scarlet fever. In the 19th century, the castle was occasionally used by the House of Hanover as a summer residence. As a result, Georg Ludwig Friedrich Laves had several interior alterations made in 1839 and 1840. During World War I, it was used as a detention camp for officers (Offizerslager or Oflag) by the German Army.

=== The castle today ===
The castle still has a variety of rooms and halls that date back to different periods. The court chapel was converted after the Reformation and has been preserved almost unchanged with its renaissance architecture. The baroque-style staterooms were created under George William and have also been preserved. In the Gothic Hall there are constantly changing exhibitions and in the East Wing is a section of Celle's Bomann Museum, which is dedicated to the history of the Kingdom of Hanover. The historic castle rooms and the castle chapel restored between 1978 and 1981, may be visited as part of a guided tour.

== Castle Theatre ==
The court theatre of the castle, the Schlosstheater Celle, is one of the oldest preserved theatres of its kind and one of the few baroque theatres in North Germany. It still has its own theatre company today.

The present Schlosstheater was built on the instigation of Duke George William, who before he came to power spent some time in Venice and came to know Italian opera whilst he was there. The theatre was designed by the Italian architect Giuseppe Arighini. Construction work on the theatre began in 1670 and was largely finished by 1675. The duke hosted a succession of theatre companies, that he recruited, for example, from France, Italy and also nearby Hanover. On the death of the duke the theatre became orphaned until the short-lived stay of Caroline Matilda, for whom the theatre was given a second gallery.

The theatre was conceived for the benefit of the court and was never intended to be open to the public, who were first allowed a moderate degree of access to plays at the end of the 18th century. The theatre was regularly used until the late 19th century but was closed in 1890 and fell into disuse. In 1935 it underwent a thorough renovation.

== Castle Park ==
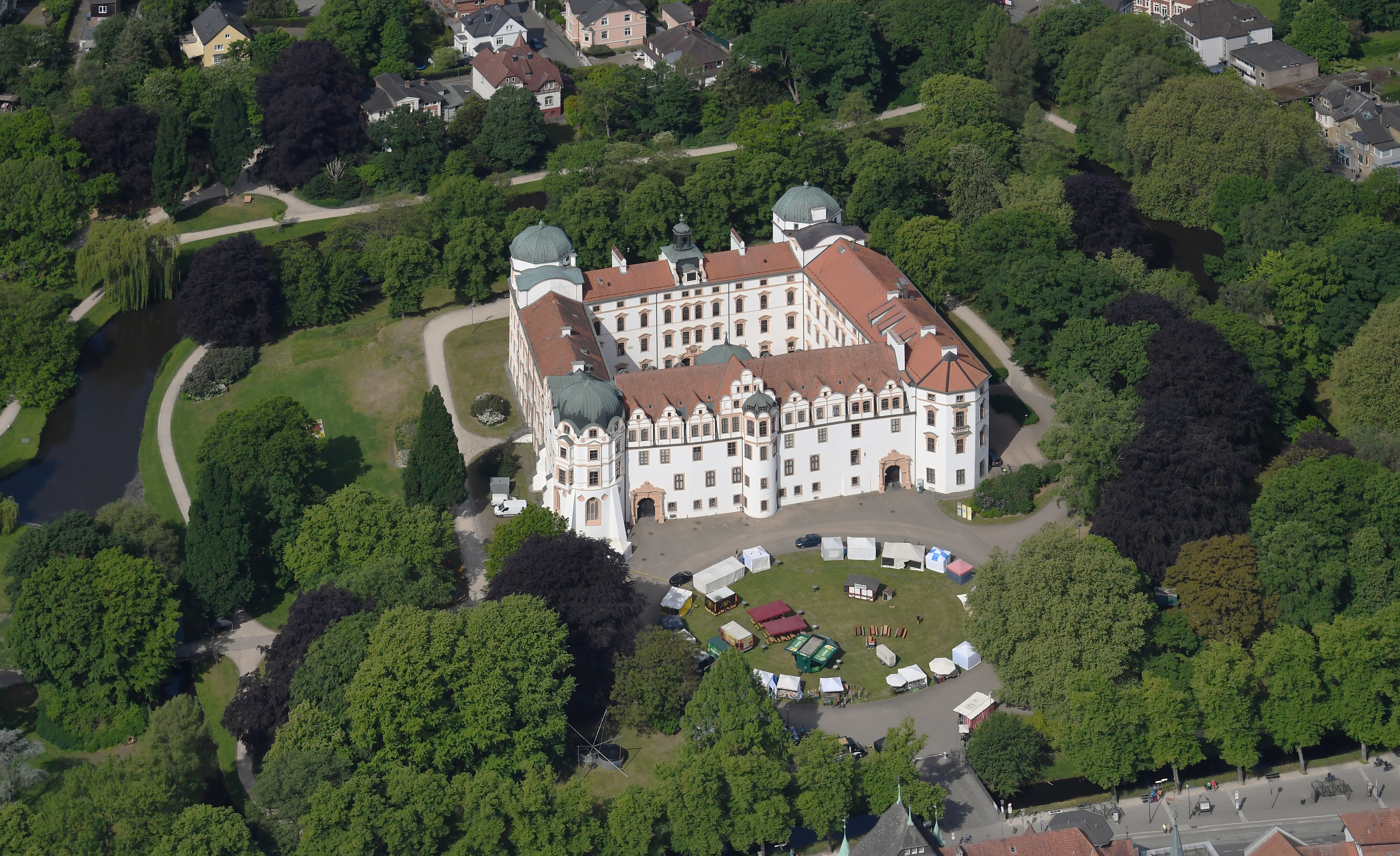
Aerial view of Celle Castle and its parks

Because the castle was never used for any military purposes, between 1785 and 1802 the outer bastions were dismantled and used as fill for the once deep, wide castle moats. In 1826 gardens were laid out in the vicinity of the castle by levelling and removing the defensive embankments. In their place, trees and shrubs were planted and lawns laid. In the 19th century, a landscape garden was created in the area immediately surrounding the castle. Since part of the park was given away for building residential accommodation around 1900, the park has retained an area of about 7 hectares (17 acres). The castle still sits on an island today that is surrounded by moats.

Outside the former defensive belt, but not far from the castle, George William had the French Garden ("Französischer Garten"), a baroque park designed on French lines, laid out in the late 17th century. This was later converted to an English landscape garden, but the former baroque layout can still be made out in certain areas of the park.

== Literature ==
- Horst Masuch: Das Schloß in Celle. Lax-Verlag 1983
- Uwe Albrecht: Der Renaissancebau des Celler Schlosses. Verlag Stadt Celle, 2003
- Juliane Schmieglitz-Otten (Hrsg.): Die barocken Staatsgemächer im Celler Schloss. Verlag Stadt Celle, 2006

== Gallery ==
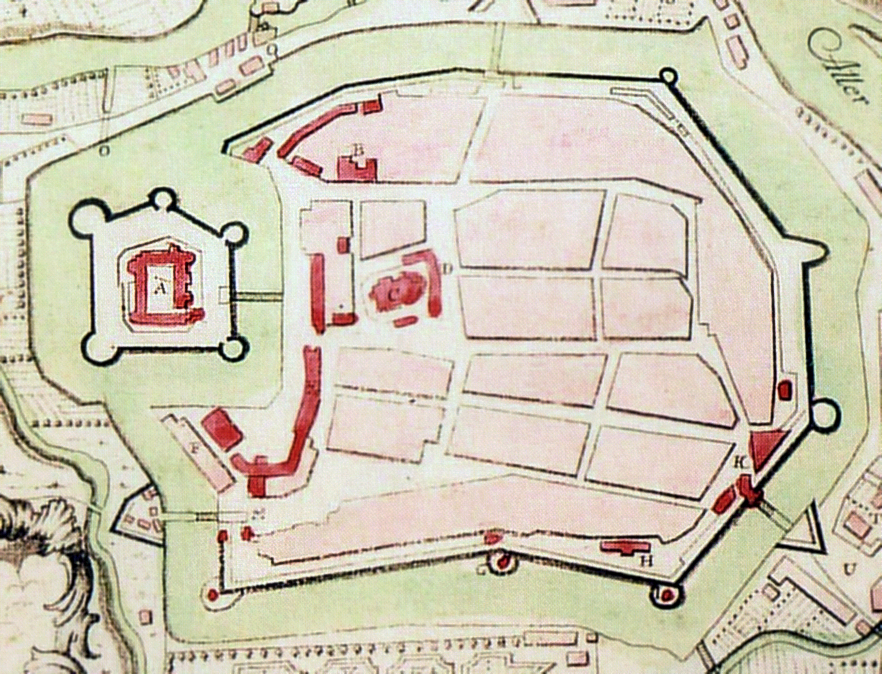
Map of the island fortifications before 1762

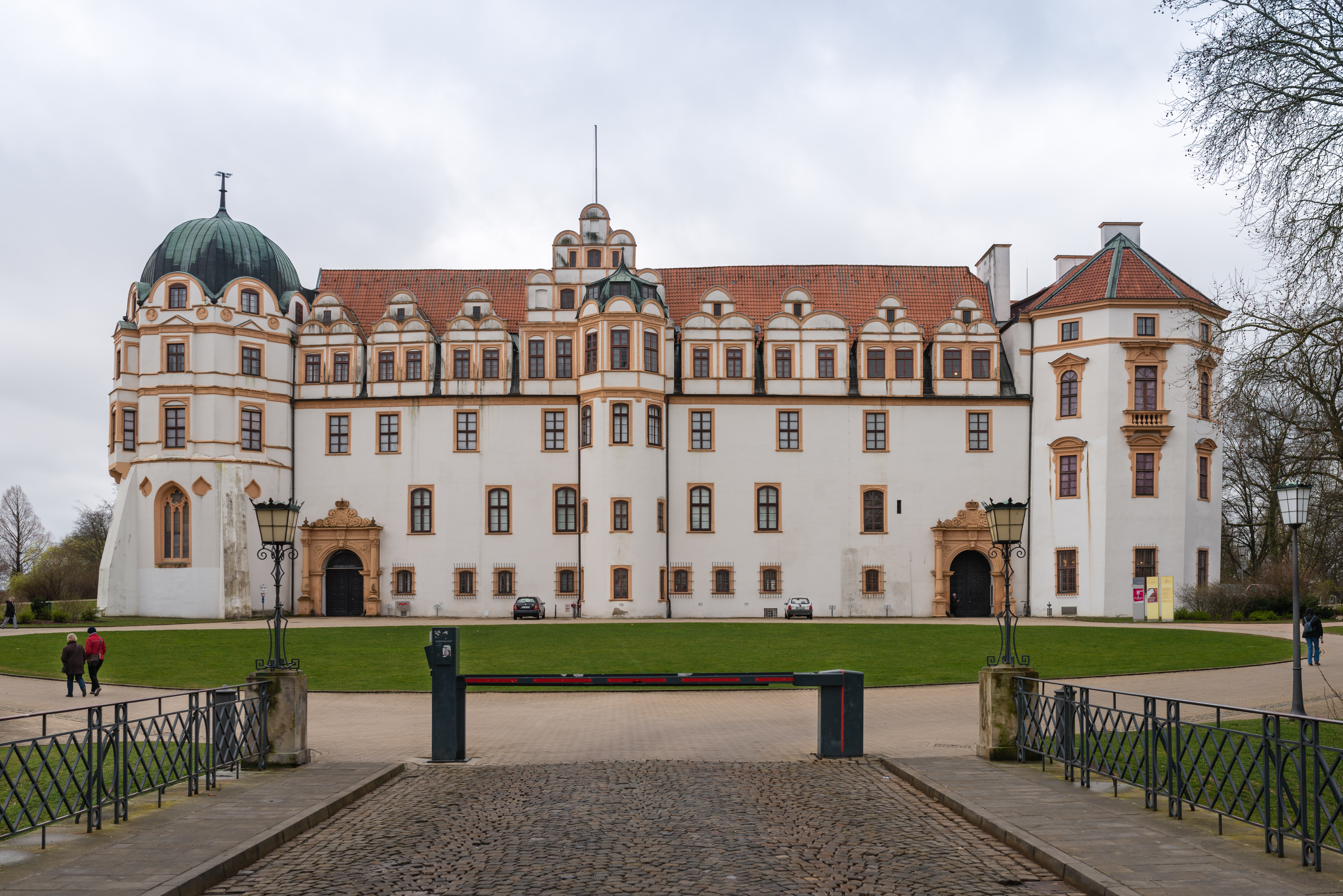
Front Façade of Celle Castle

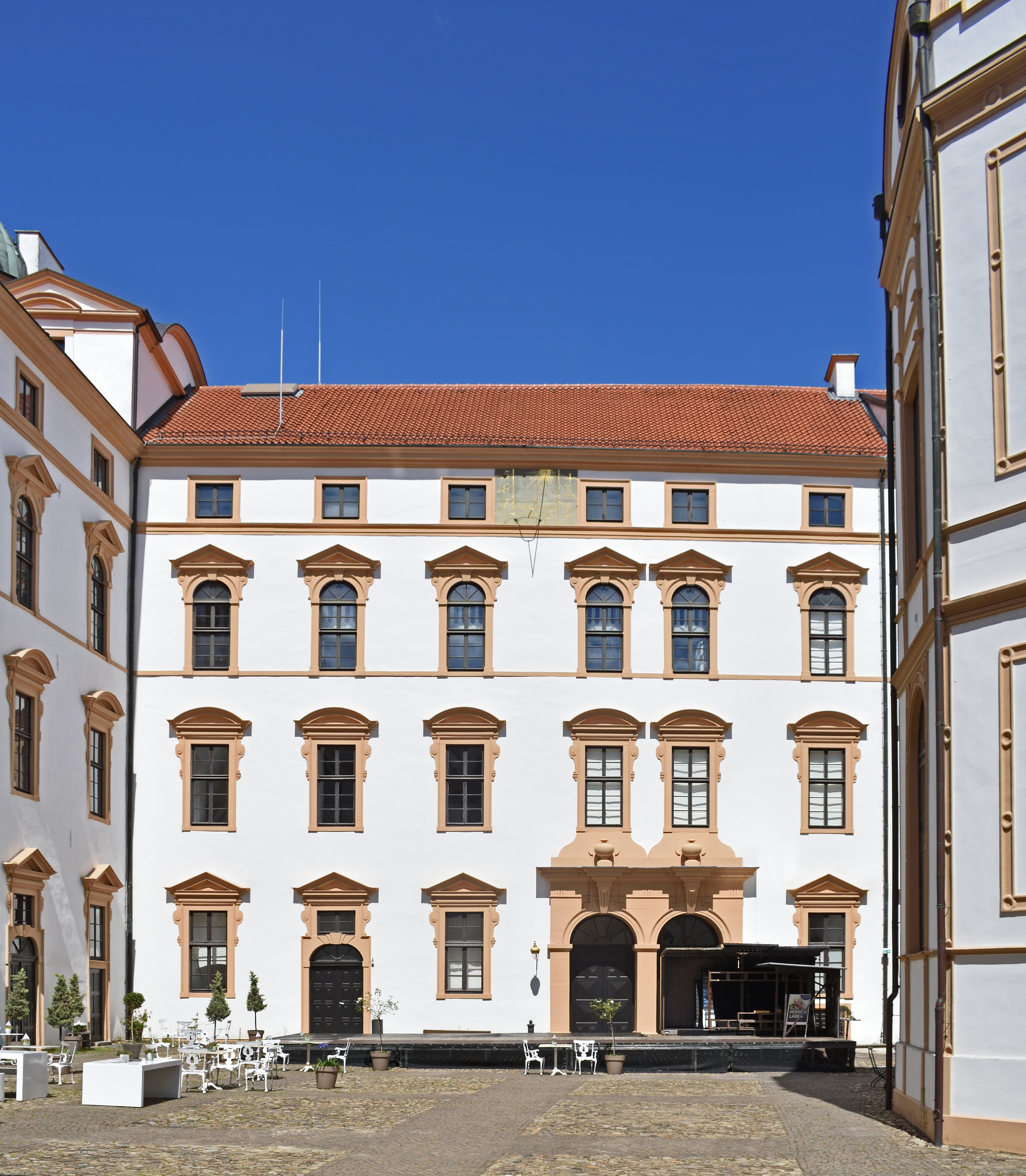
Inner courtyard

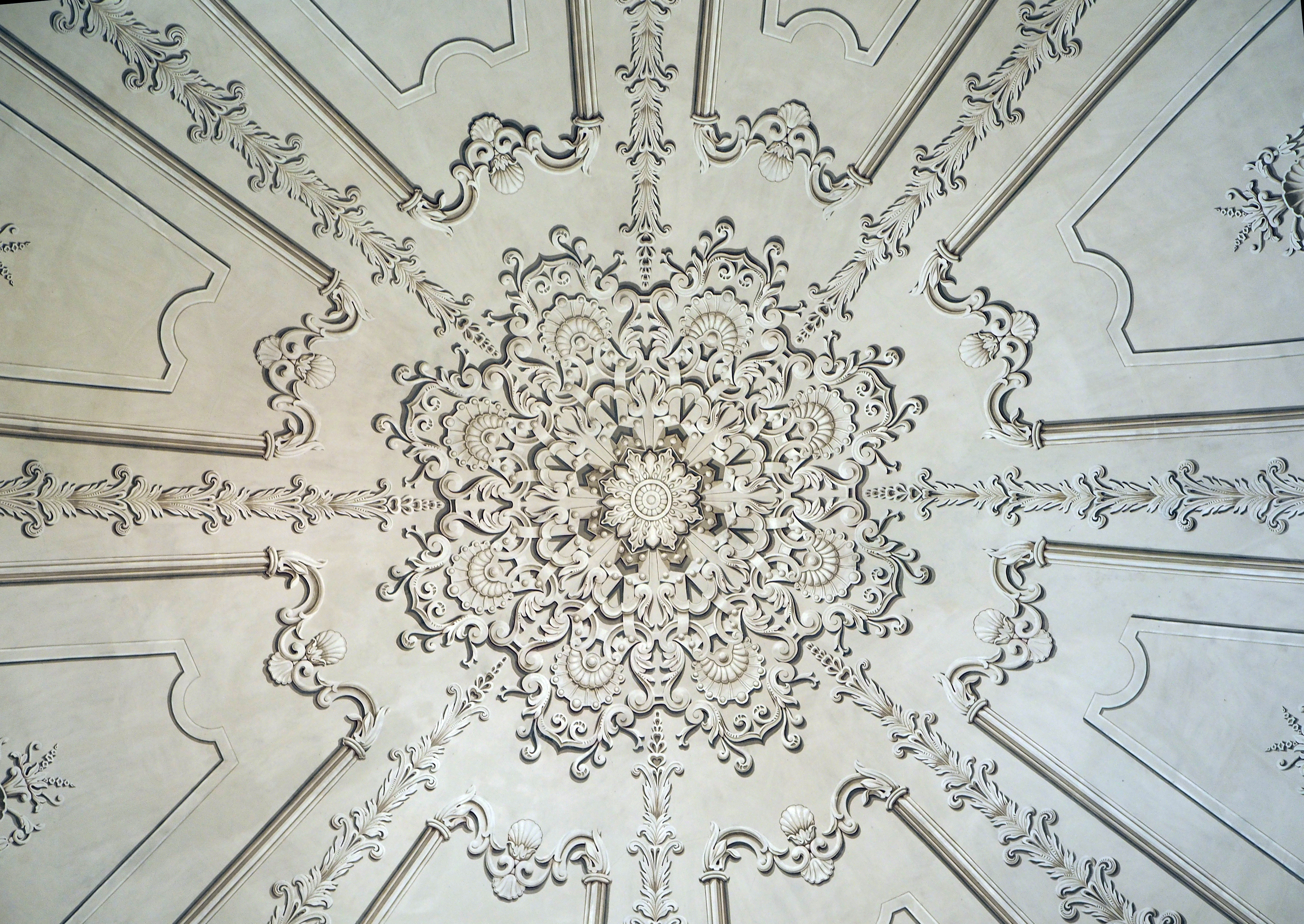
Ornaments above the grand staircase

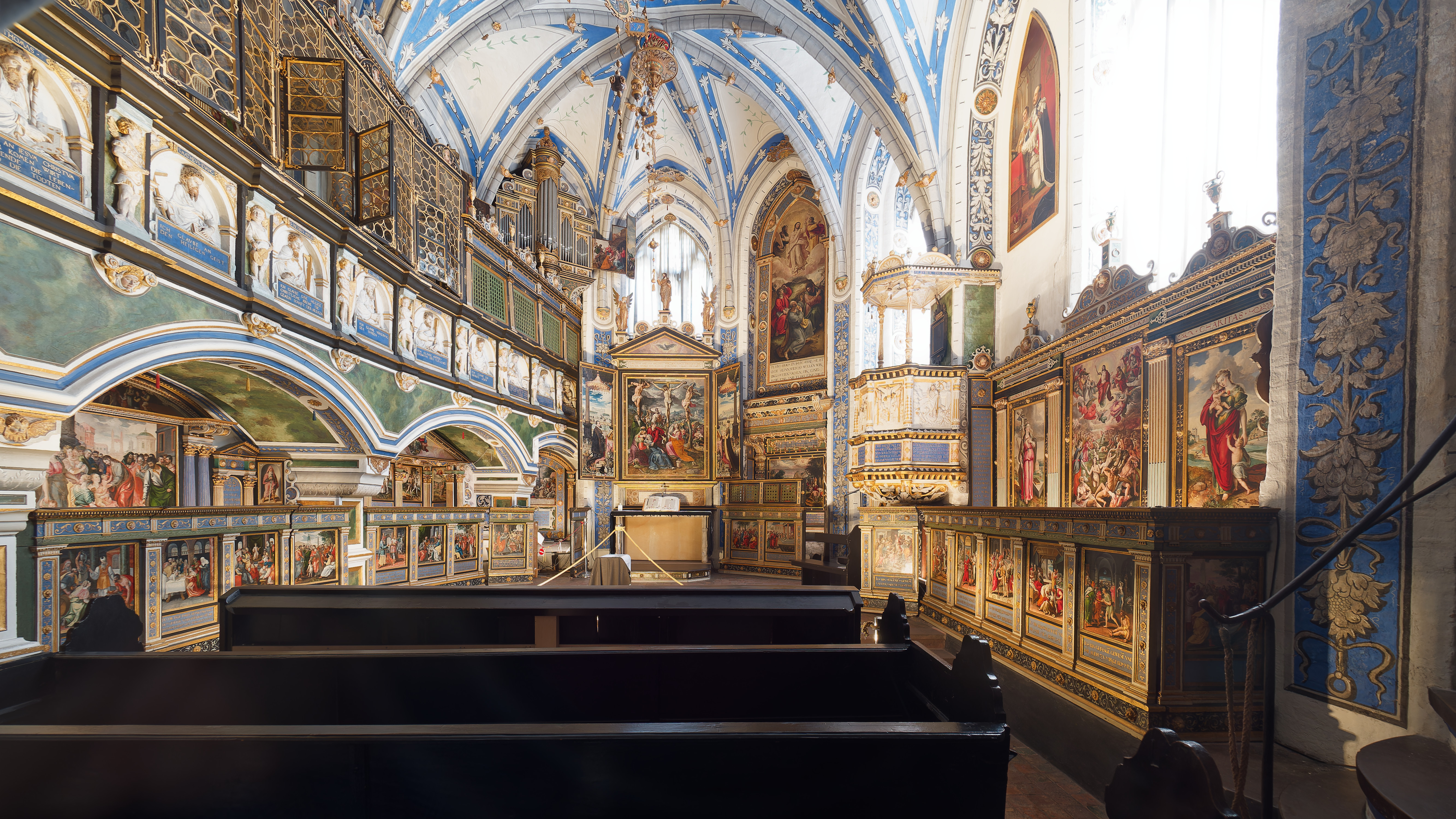
The Celle Castle chapel

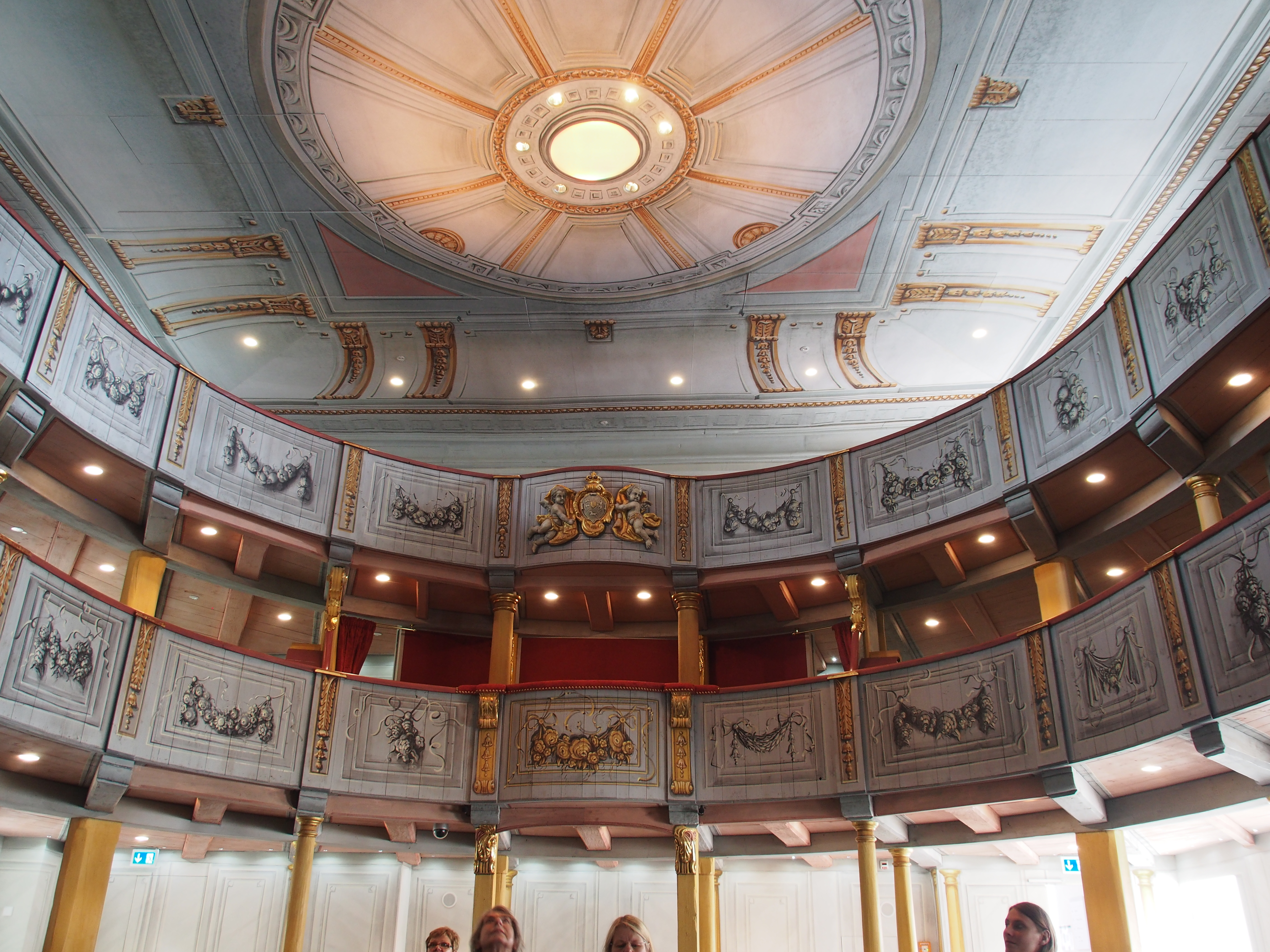
The Celle Castle theater

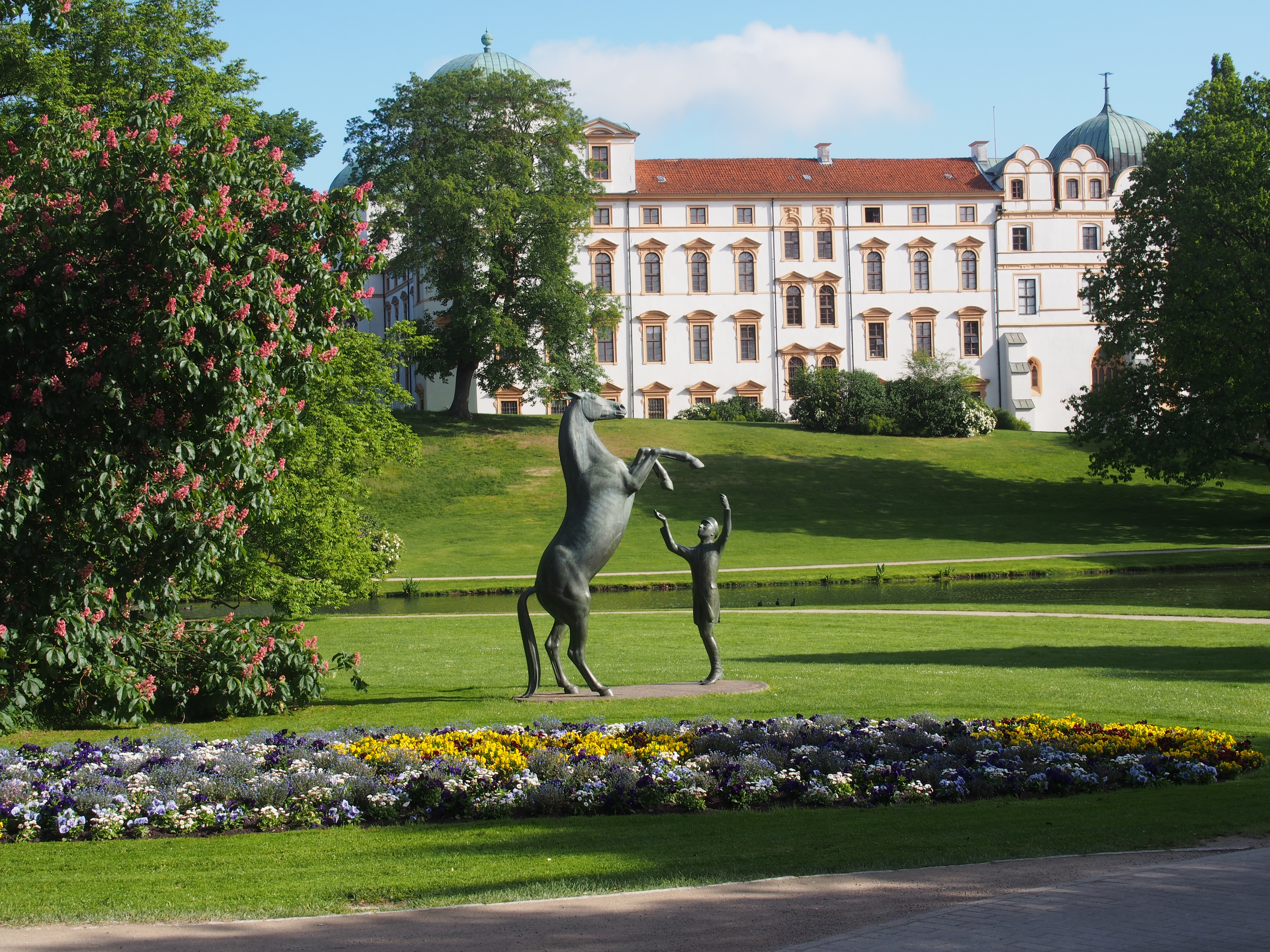
Stallion Wohlklang sculpture bronze statue in the castle grounds
