= Schlosstheater Celle =

Coordinates: 52°37′26″N 10°04′39″E

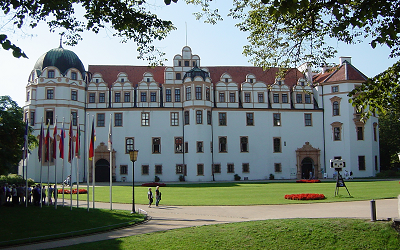
Celle Castle (September 2003)

The Castle Theatre in Celle (German: Schlosstheater Celle) is the court theatre which was established between 1670 and 1674/75 on the initiative of the opera lover, George William (1624-1705), Prince of Lüneburg from the House of Brunswick and Lüneburg, as part of the refurbishment and baroque restyling of Celle Castle. This baroque theatre, which fell into disuse and neglect for a while, was comprehensively renovated in 1935 with a horseshoe-shaped auditorium in the Italian style and is one of the oldest theatre buildings in Europe.

The stalls and two circles of the auditorium, the second gallery being an 18th-century addition, has a total of 330 seats.

Attached to the Castle Theatre is a smaller stage (Studiobühne) known as the Malersaal ("paint shop") with 40 seats.

== Directors ==
From 1998 to 2008 Karin H. Veit was the director of the theatre. Since March 2008 it has been temporarily led by the dramaturg, Bettina Wilts.
