= Giuseppe Arighini =

Italian architect

Giuseppe Arighini was an Italian architect of the Baroque period. He was born in Brescia in the 17th century. He built the castle theatre (Schloßtheater) (1670–1674) in Celle Castle in the town of Celle in the German state of Lower Saxony for Duke George William of Brunswick-Lüneburg. This theater was renowned in the first decades of the end of 17th and beginning of 18th century as a center for Francophile music, and was visited by a young Johann Sebastian Bach on his way to Lüneburg. Arighini also designed buildings in Hannover as late as 1690. He also painted quadratura.
