= Imperial Palace, Gelnhausen =

Coordinates: 50°12′0″N 9°11′44″E

Imperial Palace Gelnhausen
- Kaiserpfalz Gelnhausen
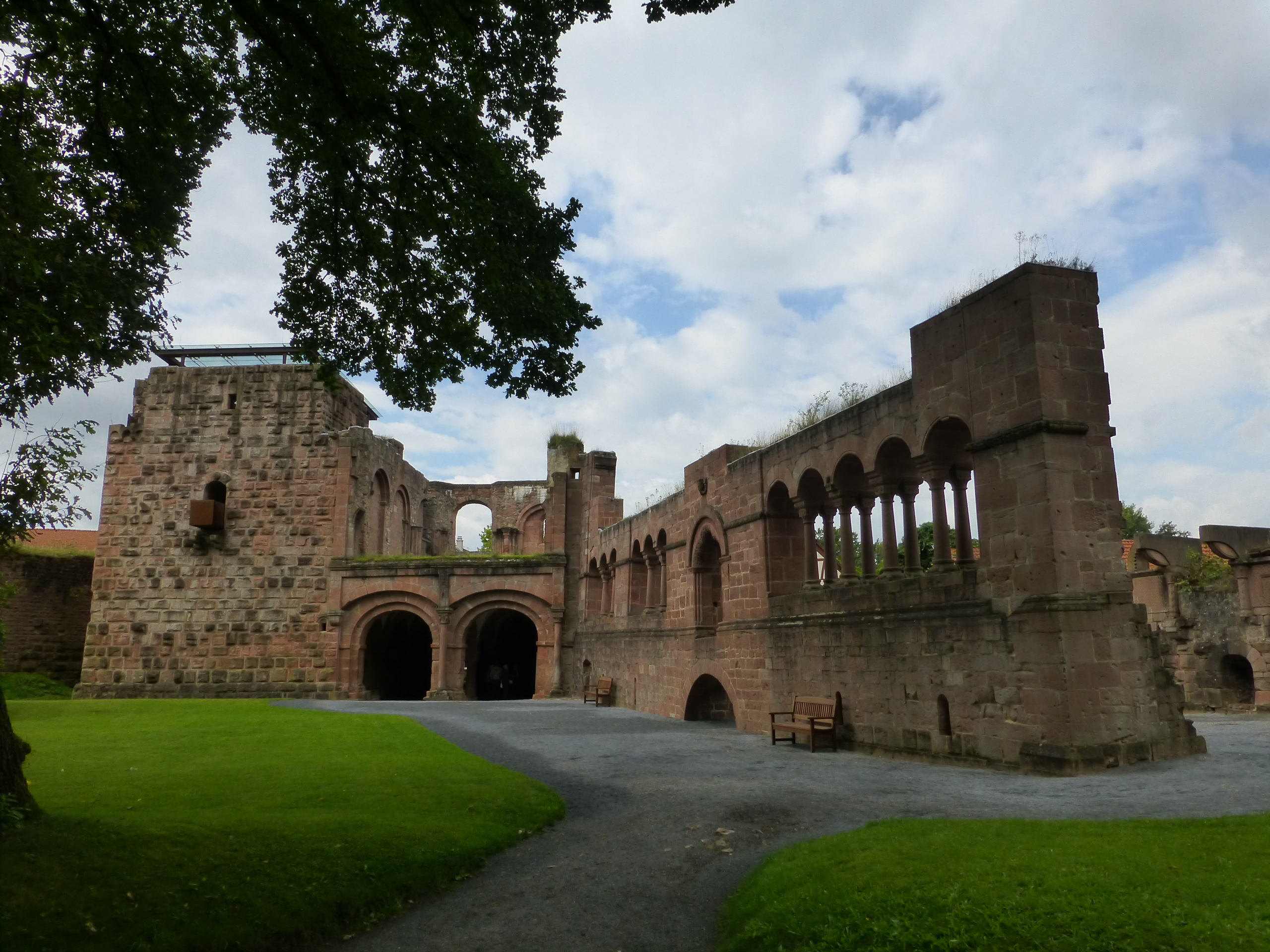
- From left to right: Rectangle keep, gate house, palas facade

- Location within Hesse Location within Germany
- Alternative names: Pfalz Gelnhausen

General information
- Status: in ruins
- Type: palace
- Architectural style: Romanesque
- Location: Gelnhausen, Germany
- Owner: State of Hesse

The Imperial Palace at Gelnhausen (called in German Kaiserpfalz Gelnhausen, Pfalz Gelnhausen or Barbarossaburg) is located on a former island in the Kinzig river in Gelnhausen, Hesse, Germany.

== Site ==
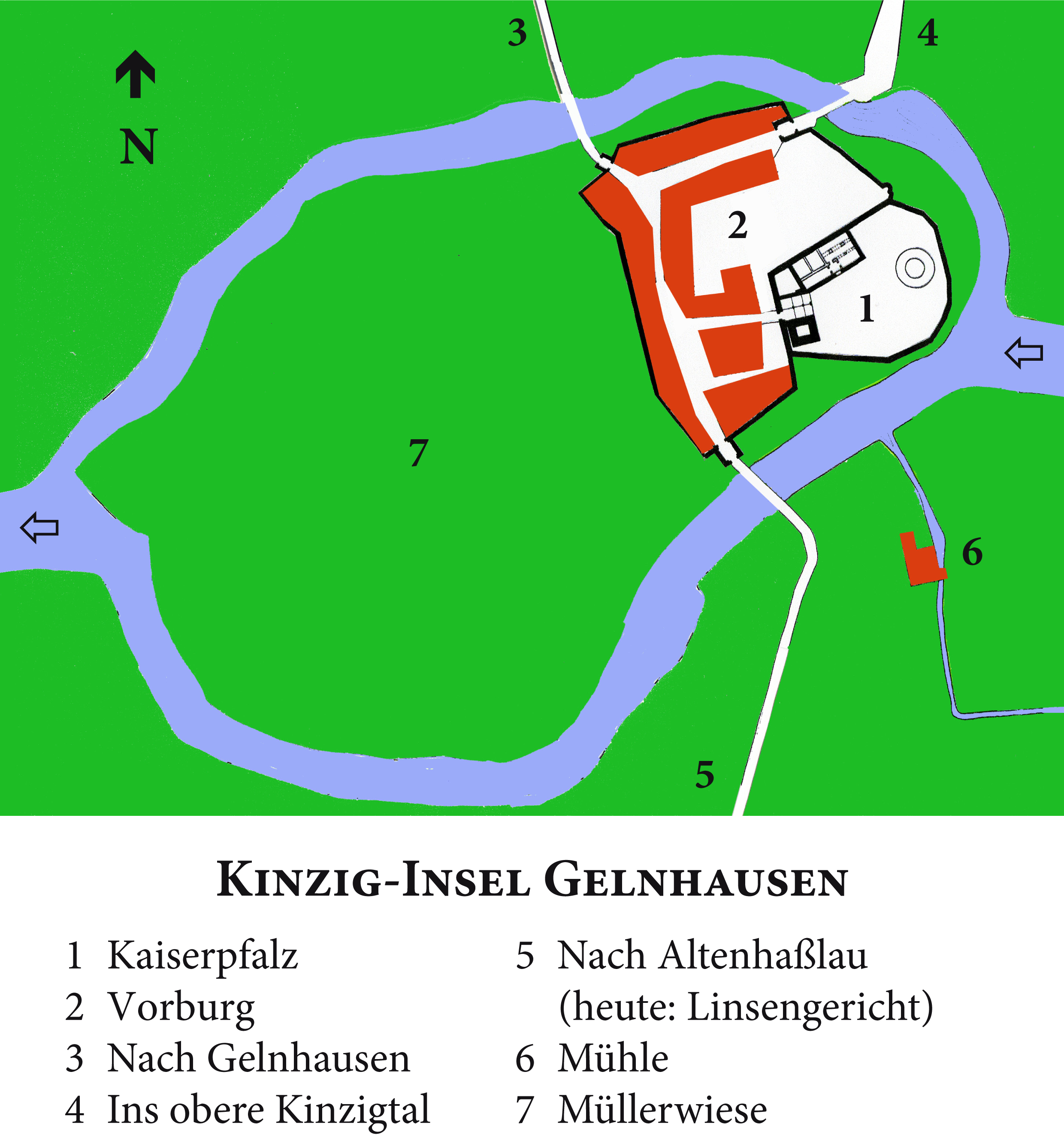
Position of Kaiserpfalz and outer bailey on the Kinzig island: 1 Palace area, 2 Outer bailey, 3 Street to Gelnhausen, 4 Street to the upper Kinzig valley, 5 Street to Altenhaßlau (nowadays: Linsengericht, 6 Mill, 7 Müllerwiese

The Palace was built during the decades of 1160–1180. The town in its neighbourhood (officially founded in 1170) was closely linked to the palace. The site of the palace was an island in the Kinzig river. The foundation of the walls and buildings was very difficult in such a soft underground and structural stability of the buildings proved a problem until today. The underground was stabilised by about 12,000 wooden poles on which the buildings stand.

Together with the palace an outer bailey was placed on the island containing the houses of the Burgmannen, a settlement in its own right independent from the town of Gelnhausen until the beginning of the 19th century.

The palace lay at the eastern rim of Wetterau, an imperial territory, and enabled its administration together with other imperial castles such as Frankfurt, Friedberg, Wetzlar, Trebur and Seligenstadt. The Gelnhausen palace also controlled the important long-distance highway Via Regia between Frankfurt and Leipzig as it passes through the valley of the Kinzig river.

== History ==
Both, palace and town, go back to Emperor Frederick I (Barbarossa). The exact date when construction of the palace began was much disputed by historians. Debate revolved around the question of whether the building of the palace took place a few years before the official founding of the royal town in 1170. The relative chronology of the erection of its buildings is known since several decades due to a large amount of Mason's marks on the building site. About 60 different masons have worked on the site but never more than 10 to 20 at the same time. In 1992 it was possible to extract several poles of the wooden sub construction from under the gate building during restoration works. Three of them could be analyzed by Dendrochronology, all three dating into the winter 1169/70 or the summer of 1170. So, knowing by the Mason's marks that the gate building was erected well into the second half of the building activities it gives the two decades between 1160 and 1180 as the time of construction.

In 1180, the imperial palace at Gelnhausen was the venue for the great imperial court or Hoftag of Gelnhausen, at which Henry the Lion was put on trial in his absence and his imperial fiefs redistributed. The now ruined palas was probably used as an assembly hall for this event. In the years that followed, further imperial courts were convened at Gelnhausen.

During the Hohenstaufen era, the palace was an Imperial Castle (Reichsburg), had a burgrave and Burgmannen. Its estate included Büdingen Forest, in which the occupants of the outer bailey still retained timber rights (for construction and firewood) until the 19th century. The decline of the palace began as early as the 14th century when, in 1349, Emperor Charles IV (HRR) enfeoffed it, together with the town, to the Counts of Schwarzburg and never reclaimed it. In 1431, the Count of Hanau and Count Palatine Louis III procured the palace and town from Count Henry of Schwarzburg. During the Thirty Years' War (1618–1648), the town and palace were severely damaged.

After the death of Johann Reinhard III, Count of Hanau-Lichtenberg, the last male member of the House of Hanau, in 1736, the Landgraves of Hesse-Kassel inherited the Hanau half of Gelnhausen and later bought the other half owned by the Electors of Palatinate. The palace was then used as a quarry until 1811. Around 1810, the palace became one of the first buildings from the epoch of Romanesque architecture in Germany that attracted the interest of art-loving scholars. So it was forbidden to use the buildings as a quarry further on and first attempts to secure them started. Not withstanding this the castle chapel, used for Protestant services between 1764 and 1811 was demolished in 1856 due to the expected costs of an otherwise necessary restoration.

== Current Use ==
Today, the palace belongs to the state of Hesse and is managed by the State Castles and Gardens of Hesse (Staatliche Schlösser und Gärten Hessen). Along with an attached castle museum, it is open to the public.

== Buildings ==
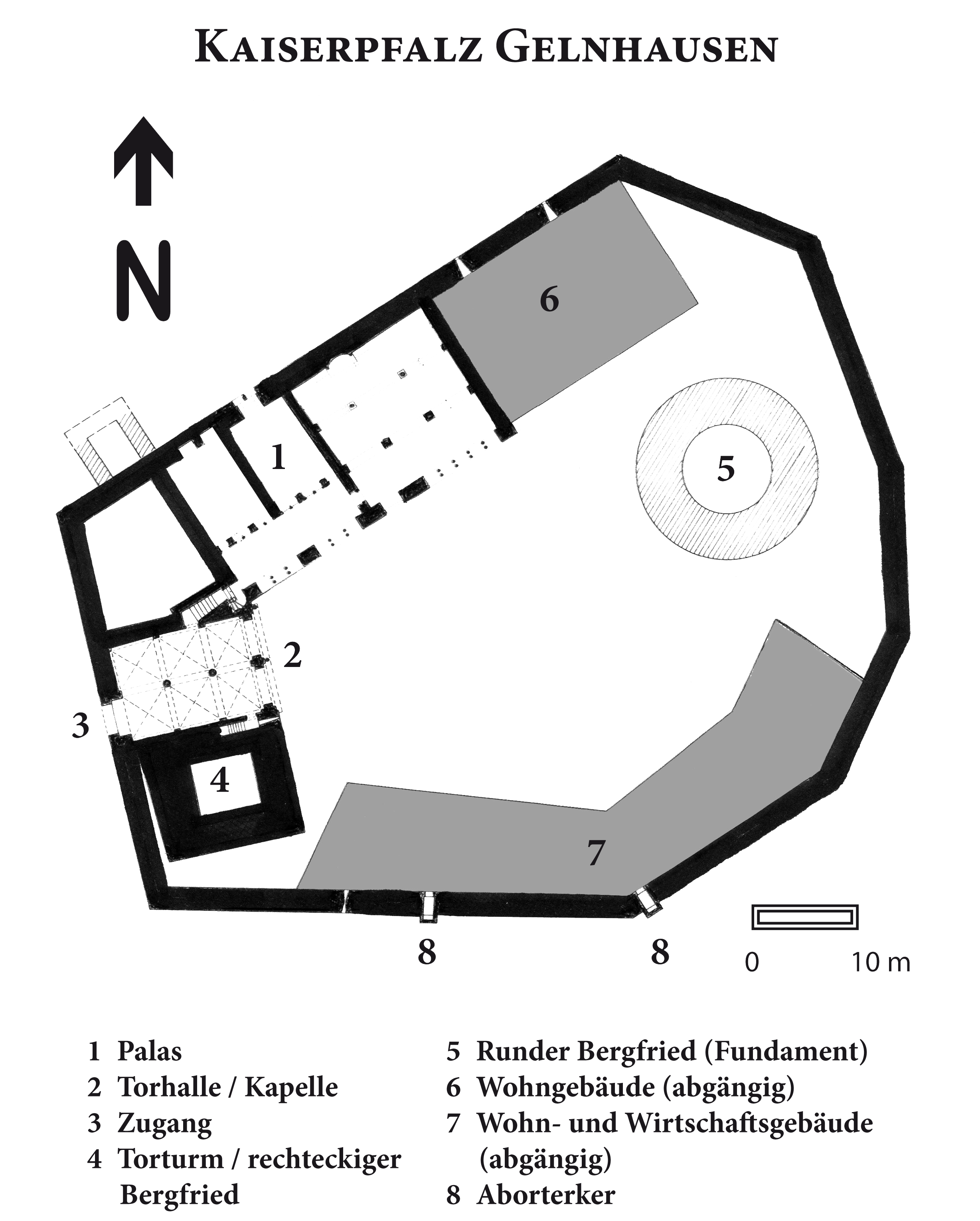
Floor plan: 1 Palas, 2 Gate hall (ground level), chapel (1st floor), 3 Entrance, 4 Rectangle keep, 5 Round keep, 6 Living quarters (vanished), 7 Service and living quarters (vanished), 8 Latrines

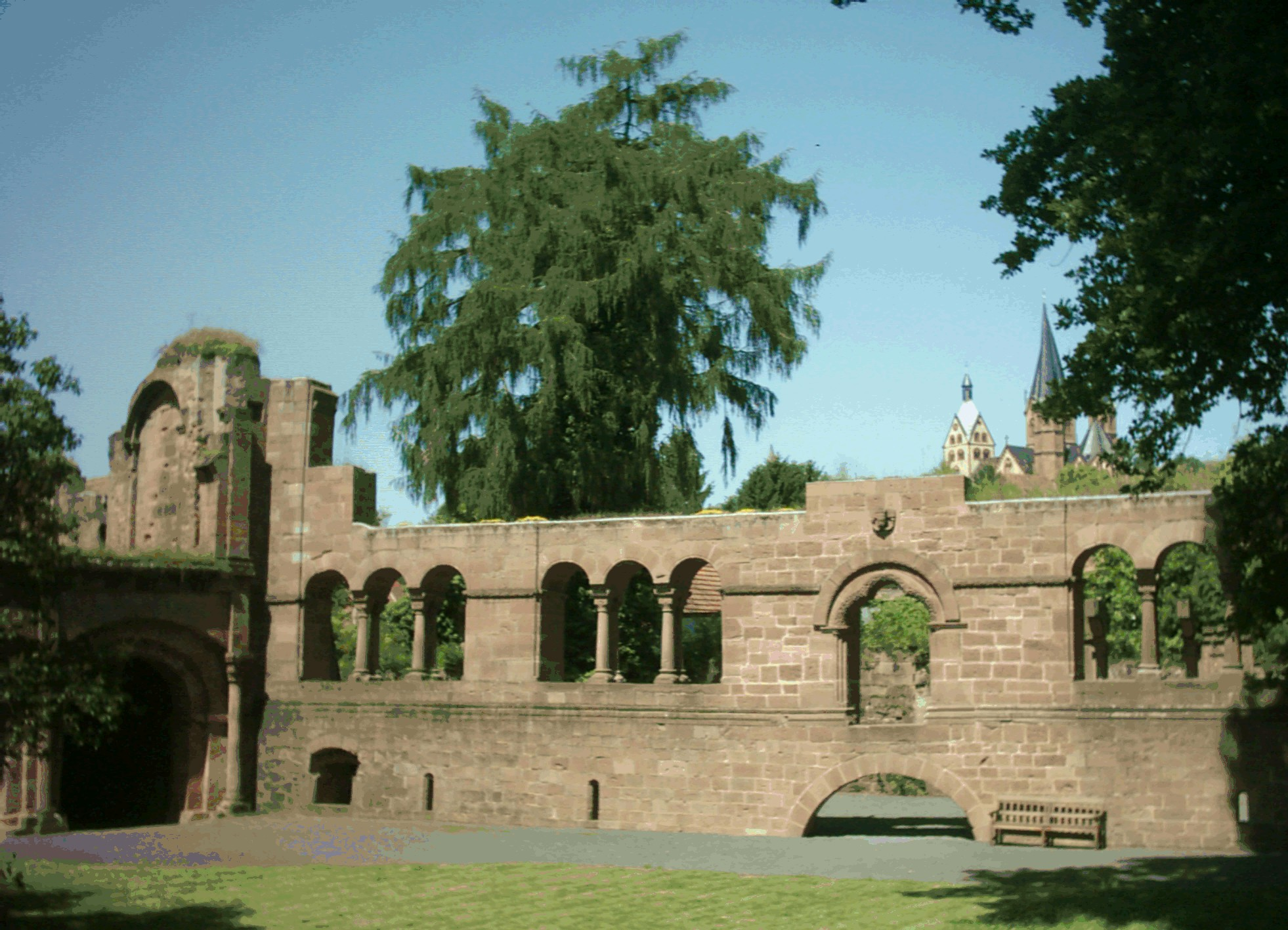
Palas facade – in the background: Marienkirche, Gelnhausen

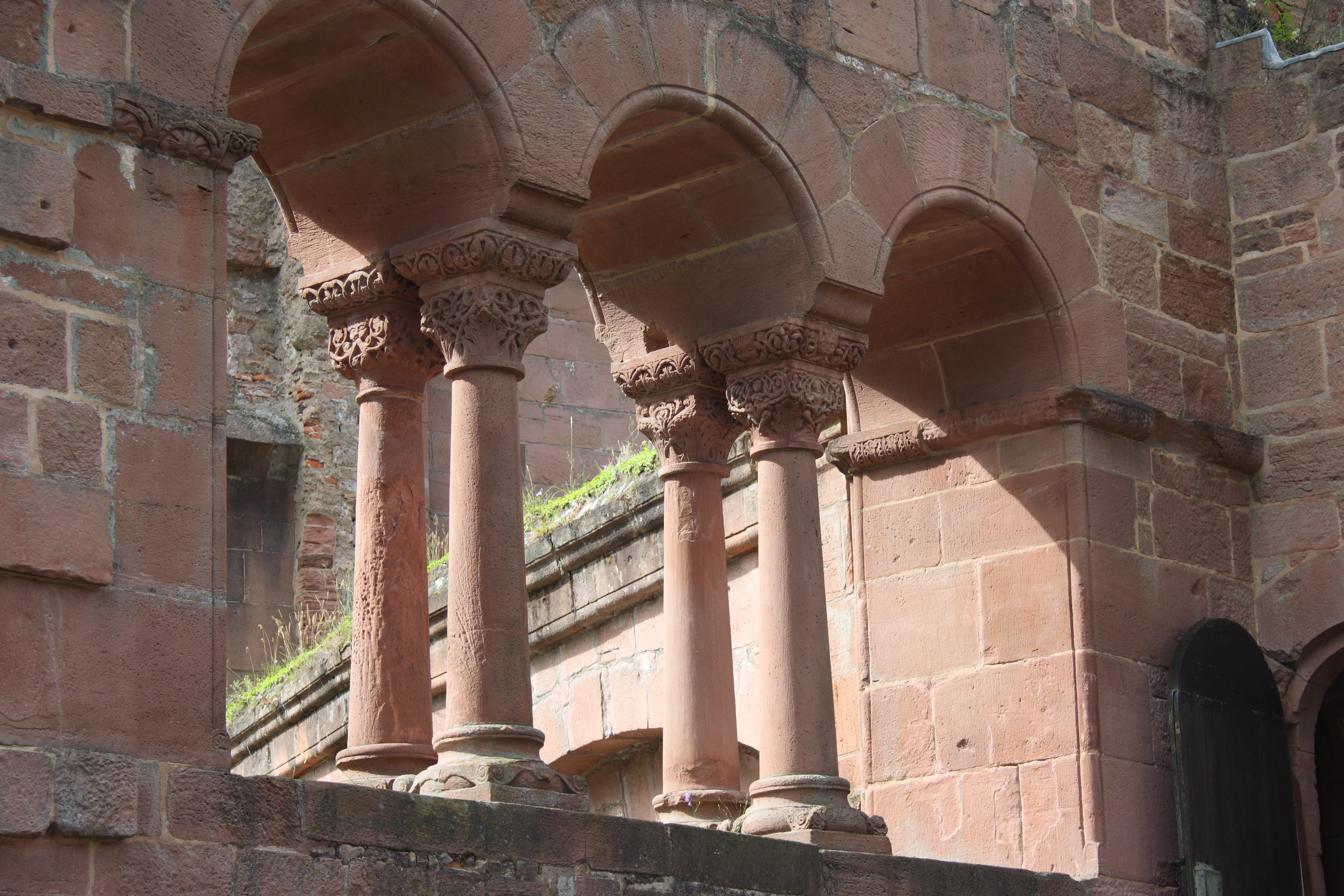
Detail of the palas

=== Ring wall ===
The ring wall is 2.10 m thick and encloses the complex with eight bends, most of whose buildings used it as a rear wall. Therefore, it is smoothly designed inwardly in the places where buildings adjoined, while on the rest and outwardly humped ashlars were used. The wall preserved in some sections up to a height of 5.50 m, but in no place up to the original height of the battlement at about 5.80 m above the ground level, which can be concluded from the connection points at the square keep.

=== Gate, chapel and rectangle keep ===
The gate building has a round-arched gate on the outside and an arcade with two arches on the inside. The gate hall extends over three bays. The columns stand on Attic-profiled bases and bear cubic capitals. Particularly noteworthy is the central one with the representation of an eagle. The southern vault dates from the 15_{th} century, while the northern one in principle dates from the time of construction. However, the vaults were removed and rebuilt in 1860. From the gate hall, a staircase led north into the palace. A keep with a rectangular ground plan on 11×12.10 m, which is still preserved to a height of 13 m, adjoins to the south. Originally, it was twice as high and its entrance was at a height of 7 m. The upper part was demolished in 1431, and replaced by a guardroom and a polygonal turret.

The chapel was placed directly above the gate hall, with an identical ground plan. In 1431 it was without a roof, but was repaired. In the 15th or 16th century, its eastern wall facing the courtyard was renewed with three round-arched windows. In 1764, the chapel was restored and then used by the inhabitants of the outer bailey for Protestant worship until 1811. After the demolition of the chapel in 1856, only few structural remains have overcome. Recognizable are the original five-tiered wall division and round-arched niches.

=== Palas ===
The Palas is located in the northern part of the palace and attached to the ring wall with its back wall. It had a floor area of 29×15.7 m. Above a low basement is a main floor, which was accessed from the courtyard via a representative, probably two-flight, open staircase. The representative facade facing the courtyard is probably the most impressive part of the complex. It is laid out asymmetrically, offset by 1.30 m, with 3+3 window axes on the western side and five window axes on the eastern side, each of which is bound together in arcades and designed internally with double columns. Their block capitals are decorated with plant motifs. Between the double group of three and the group of five windows is the entrance portal with a clover-shaped finial, lavishly decorated with vines. The "Barbarossa's head" walled in above it was placed there later, its origin unknown. The facade of the floor above is reconstructed differently in detail: thus, a large entrance window in the dimensions of the portal below is assumed or a double window. Of the remaining window arrangement, it is assumed that it repeated that of the floor below.

It is known from archaeological research that the basement had five rooms, all of which were accessed from a central room behind the entrance, which is still recognizable today as an arch. Based on the building connections – the interior construction was largely made of wood – it is assumed that the lower main level had a corridor behind the façade that provided access to the rooms on that floor. According to the window arrangement, two living rooms are supposed to have been located to the west, and a hall to the east. A mighty chimney remains here. The main hall is assumed to have been on the floor above. On the north side, integrated into the ring wall, there was a privy that could be used from both levels.

=== Round Keep ===
As the only free-standing structure of the complex, the foundations of a round keep can be found in the courtyard. This had walls 4 meters thick and a diameter of 16 meters. It is likely that it was never completed, as a structure of these dimensions was highly problematic in the soft subsoil, and the preserved foundations – unlike the tower at the gate – are still perfectly horizontal The foundations were only uncovered during an excavation in 1931. It has a carefully profiled plinth.

=== Additional buildings ===
Within the curtain wall were other buildings, but they are not been preserved:

- To the east of the palace a building adjoined, which existence's has been proven archaeologically and thought to have provided additional living quarters.
- Along the southern ring wall stood some more service and residential buildings.

== Literature ==
- Günther Binding: Pfalz Gelnhausen. Eine Bauuntersuchung. H. Bouvier, Bonn, 1965 (Abhandlungen zur Kunst-, Musik- und Literaturwissenschaft. Vol. 30).
- Folkhard Cremer u. a.: Hessen II. Regierungsbezirk Darmstadt = Georg Dehio: Handbuch der Deutschen Kunstdenkmäler. Deutscher Kunstverlag, Berlin 2008. ISBN 978-3-422-03117-3
- Waltraud Friedrich: Kulturdenkmäler in Hessen. Main-Kinzig-Kreis II.2. Gelnhausen, Gründau, Hasselroth, Jossgrund, Linsengericht, Wächtersbach. Published by Landesamt für Denkmalpflege Hessen, Theiss, Wiesbaden/ Stuttgart, 2011, ISBN 978-3-8062-2469-6, pp. 507–511 (Denkmaltopographie Bundesrepublik Deutschland).
- Bernhard Hundeshagen: Kaiser Friedrichs I. Barbarossa Palast in der Burg zu Gelnhausen. Eine Urkunde vom Adel der von Hohenstaufen und der Kunstbildung ihrer Zeit. Mainz, 1819 (1st edition. 2nd edition followed in 1832). (Probeblatt 1810, Digitalisat bei Google-Books, Ausgabe von 1819)
- Tobias Picard: Königspfalzen im Rhein-Main-Gebiet: Ingelheim – Frankfurt – Trebur – Gelnhausen – Seligenstadt. In: Heribert Müller (ed.): "...Ihrer Bürger Freiheit" – Frankfurt am Main im Mittelalter. Beiträge zur Erinnerung an die Frankfurter Mediaevistin Elsbet Orth. Kramer, Frankfurt, 2004, ISBN 9783782905442, pp. 19–73.
