= Castle chapel =

Chapel built within a castle

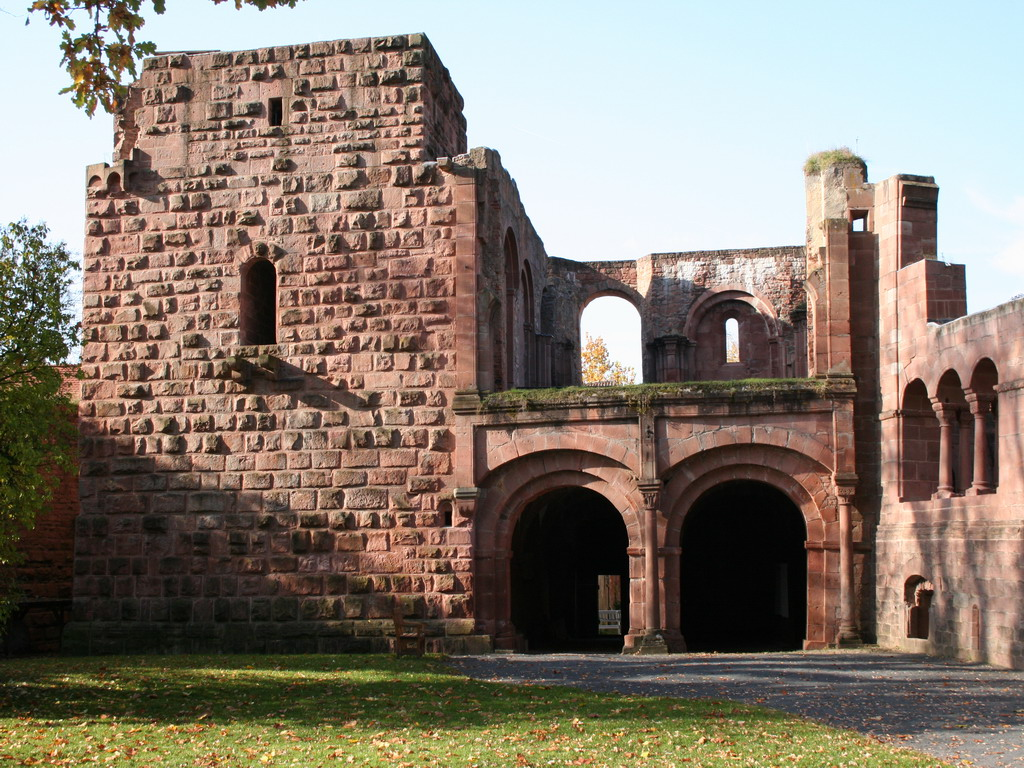
Chapel of the Imperial Palace, Gelnhausen above the gate

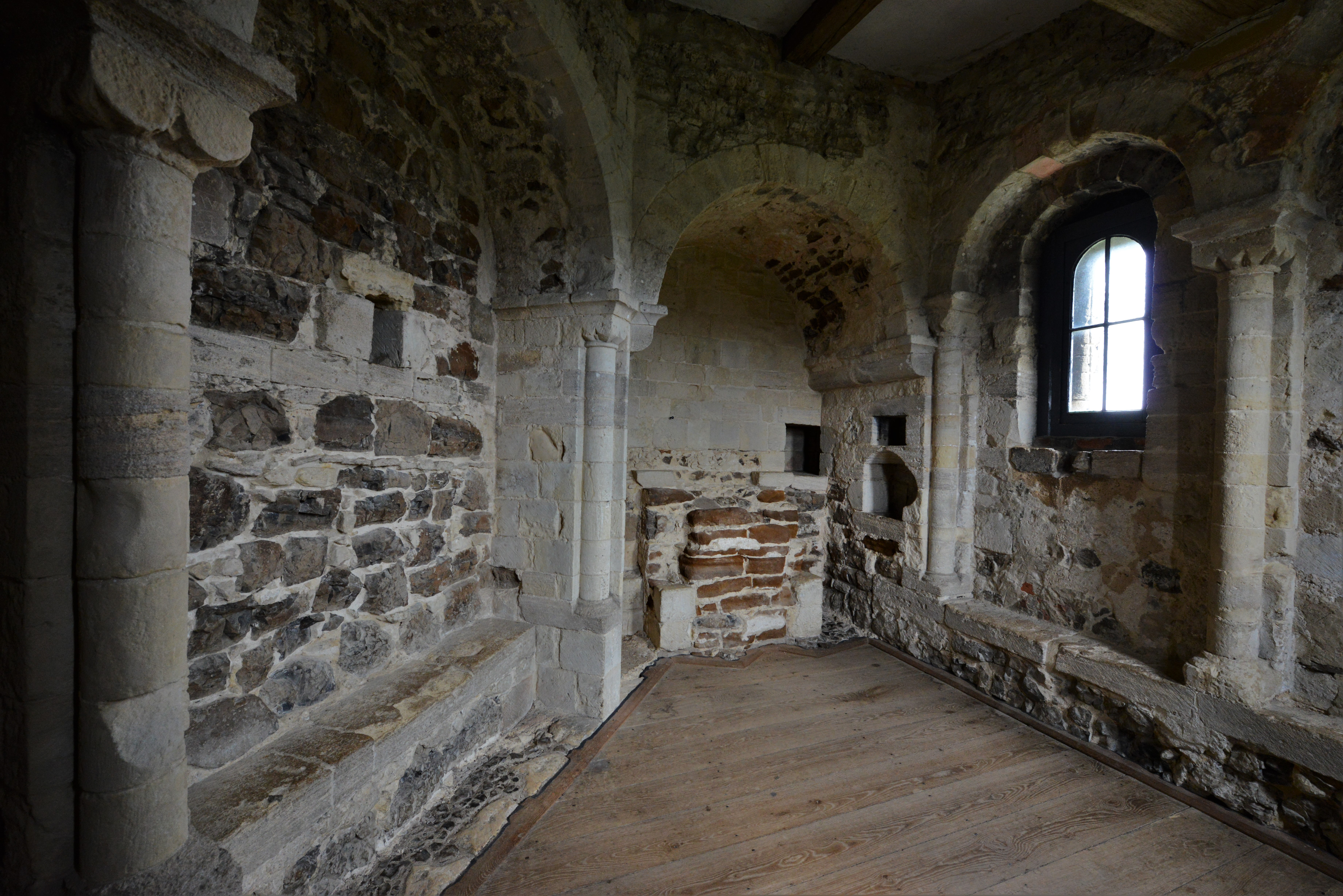
The 12th-century chapel at Orford Castle is located in the keep above the entrance to the tower.

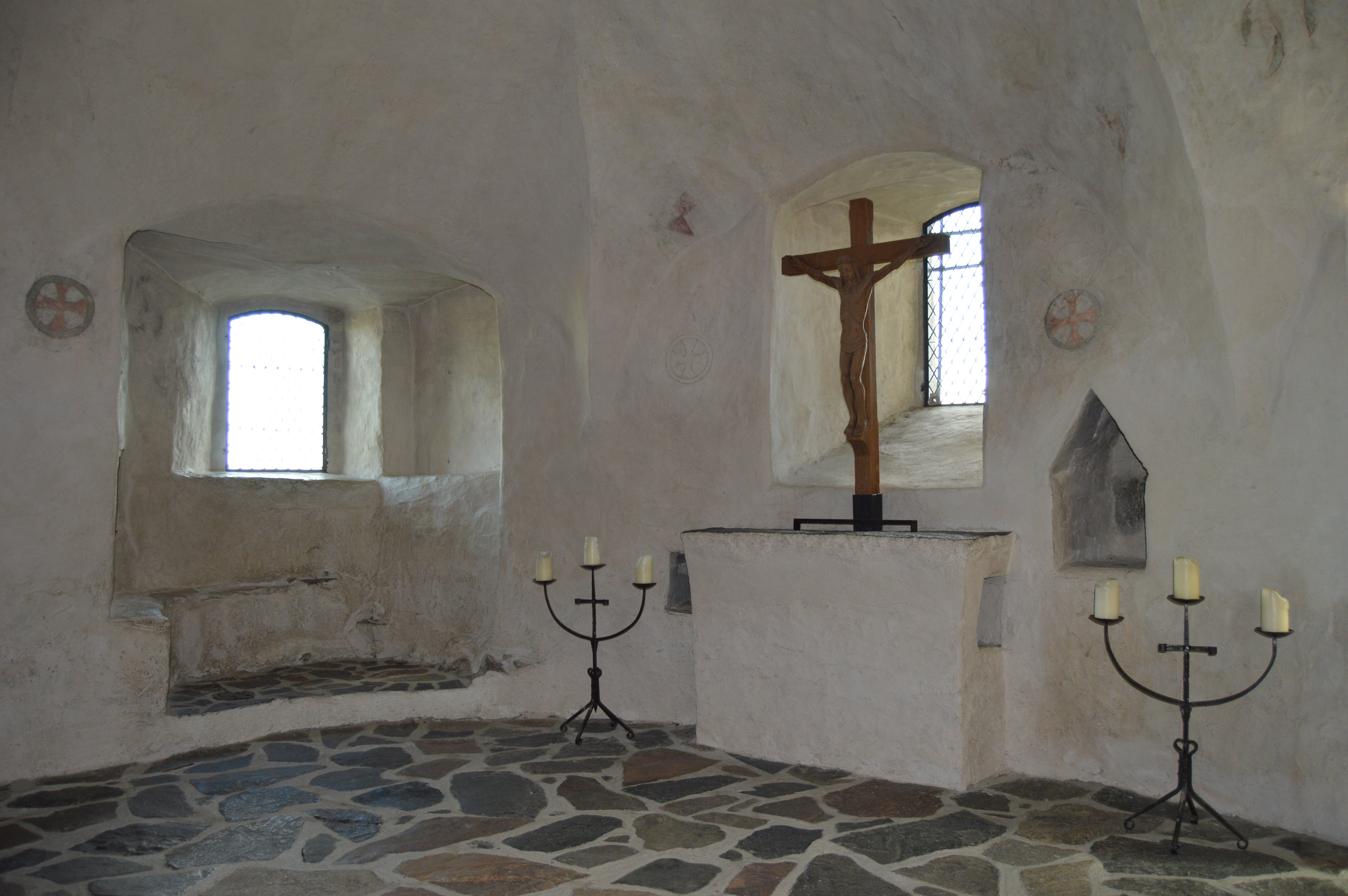
The interior of the medieval chapel at the St. Olaf's Castle

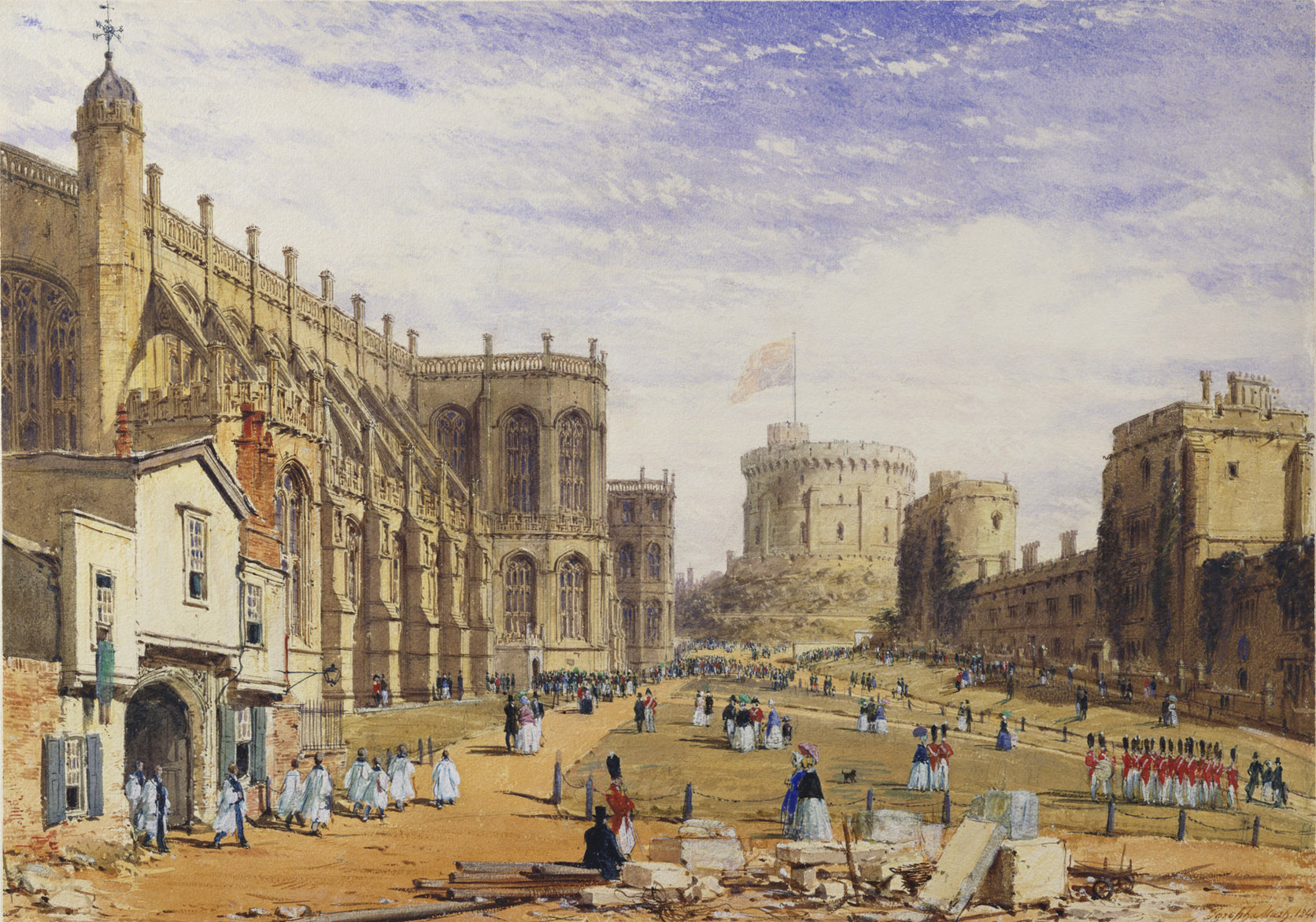
Windsor Castle, England (on the left, St George's Chapel), 1848

Castle chapels (German: Burgkapellen) in European architecture are chapels that were built within a castle. They fulfilled the religious requirements of the castle lord and his retinue, while also sometimes serving as a burial site. Because the construction of such church edifices was expensive for the lord of the castle, separate chapels are not found at every seat of the nobility. Often, a secondary room furnished with an altar had to suffice.

According to historian Sarah Speight, "The religious role of chapels was as normal, as routine, and arguably, as integral to castles as any concern for symbolism and/or military strength."

Castle chapels were usually consecrated to saints; especially those associated with knighthood, such as Saint George or Saint Gereon. In 1437, the chapel of Saint Mark at the castle in Braubach, Germany, gave the castle its present name: the Marksburg.

Frequently, castle chapels were located near the gate or in the upper storey of the gate tower as, for example, at Wildenberg Castle in the Odenwald. This was in order to claim God's protection over the most vulnerable point in the castle.

Though castle chapels might be used as a parish church by inhabitants of towns associated with castles, it was rare for castles to incorporate burial grounds.

Prominent examples are the double chapels at imperial castles and Kaiserpfalzen, for example the chapel of Nuremberg Castle. For services, the nobility were seated in their upper balconies and their retinue in the pews below. The design of the chapel stressed the differences in status.

== Examples ==
- Altenstein Castle Chapel
- Castle Chapel, Stargard Castle
- Sainte-Chapelle built for the city palace in Paris
- St John's Chapel, London, inside the Tower of London, whose buildings also include the Church of St Peter ad Vincula, a parish church.
- St George's Chapel, Windsor

== Literature ==
- Denton, Jeffrey Howard (1970), "Castle-chapels", English Royal Free Chapels, 1100–1300: A Constitutional Study, Manchester University Press, pp. 119–131, ISBN 9780719004056
- Barbara Schock-Werner (ed.): Burg- und Schloßkapellen. Kolloquium des Wissenschaftlichen Beirats der Deutschen Burgenvereinigung. Stuttgart, 1995.
- Ulrich Stevens (2003). Burgkapellen. Andacht, Repräsentation und Wehrhaftigkeit im Mittelalter. Darmstadt, Wissenschaftliche Buchgesellschaft.
- Gerhard Streich (2004). Burg und Kirche während des deutschen Mittelalters. Untersuchungen zur Sakraltopographie von Pfalzen, Burgen und Herrensitzen. Sigmaringen, Thorbecke.
- Speight, Sarah (2004), "Religion in the Bailey: Charters, Chapels and the Clergy", Château Gaillard: Études de castellologie médiévale, 21: 271–280
- Thon, Alexander; Rudersdorf, Tina (1999), "Burgkapelle, Kapellenerker und Tragaltar. Überlegungen zu einer Typologie des Sakralbereichs mittelalterlicher Burgen im Rheinland", Jahrbuch für westdeutsche Landesgeschichte, 25: 141–181, ISSN 0170-2025
