= Princess Maria Theresia of Thurn and Taxis =

Princess Maria Theresia of Thurn and Taxis may refer to:

- Princess Maria Theresia of Thurn and Taxis (1755–1810), daughter of Alexander Ferdinand, 3rd Prince of Thurn and Taxis and Princess Maria Henriette Josepha of Fürstenberg-Stühlingen
- Princess Maria Theresia of Thurn and Taxis (1794–1874), daughter of Karl Alexander, 5th Prince of Thurn and Taxis and Duchess Therese of Mecklenburg-Strelitz
- Princess Maria Theresia of Thurn and Taxis (born 1980), daughter of Johannes, 11th Prince of Thurn and Taxis and Countess Mariae Gloria of Schönburg-Glauchau
