= Maria Theresia Ahlefeldt =

German-born aristocrat and Danish composer

Princess Maria Theresia of Thurn and Taxis
- Countess of Ahlefeldt-Langeland
- Born: 16 January 1755; Regensburg, Free Imperial City of Regensburg, Holy Roman Empire
- Died: 20 December 1810 (aged 55); Prague, Kingdom of Bohemia, Austrian Empire
- Spouse: Ferdinand, Count of Ahlefeldt-Langeland
Names
- German: Maria Theresia
- House: Thurn und Taxis (by birth); Ahlefeldt (by marriage)
- Father: Alexander Ferdinand, 3rd Prince of Thurn and Taxis
- Mother: Princess Maria Henriette Josepha of Fürstenberg-Stühlingen

Maria Theresia von Ahlefeldt (16 January 1755 – 20 December 1810) was a German born aristocrat and a Danish composer. She is known as the first female composer in Denmark.

== Biography ==
Born in Regensburg, Maria Theresia was the eldest child of Alexander Ferdinand, 3rd Prince of Thurn and Taxis (1704–1773) and his third wife, Princess Maria Henriette Josepha of Fürstenberg-Stühlingen (1732–1772). She was a younger half-sister of Karl Anselm, 4th Prince of Thurn and Taxis and niece of Maria Augusta of Thurn and Taxis.

She grew in a cultural environment at the princely court in Regensburg, which was a centre of French, German and Italian opera, theatre, ballet, pantomimes and concerts. She was instructed in clavecin playing with her sisters and displayed an early talent of music composition.

Maria Theresia was engaged to Prince Joseph of Fürstenberg (1758–1796) from 1772 until her affair with an elderly German Prince Philipp of Hohenlohe-Ingelfingen (1702–1781) in 1776. Her family, however, refused permission for her to marry Philipp. In 1780 in Prague, she married the Danish noble Count Ferdinand of Ahlefeldt-Langeland (1747–1815), against the will of her family. This marriage against the will of her family was a criminal act for which she was forced to flee to avoid arrest.

From 1780, Maria Theresia's spouse was Marshal at the Court of Ansbach, where she was active in the amateur theatre of Elizabeth Craven. During this time, she wrote a libretto. From 1792 to 1794, her spouse was marshal of the Danish royal court and director of the Royal Danish Theatre. Maria Theresia composed music for several ballets, operas, and plays of the royal theatre. She was given good critic as a composer and described as a "virkelig Tonekunstnerinde" ('a True Artist of Music').

She moved to Dresden with her spouse in 1798, and lived from 1800 until her death in Prague.

== Selection of work ==
- La Folie, ou quel Conte! (libretto) 1780s
- Telemak paa Calypsos Øe (music, aria, choir), 1792
- Veddemaalet (music), 1793
- Romance de Nina 1794/98

== Ancestry ==
Ancestors of Maria Theresia Ahlefeldt

8. Eugen Alexander Franz, 1st Prince of Thurn and Taxis
4. Anselm Franz, 2nd Prince of Thurn and Taxis
9. Princess Anna Adelheid of Fürstenberg
2. Alexander Ferdinand, 3rd Prince of Thurn and Taxis
10. Ferdinand August, Prince of Lobkowicz, Duke of Sagan
5. Princess Maria Ludovika of Lobkowicz
11. Margravine Maria Anna of Baden-Baden
1. Maria Theresia Ahlefeldt
12. Prosper Ferdinand, Landgrave of Fürstenberg-Stühlingen
6. Joseph William Ernest, Prince of Fürstenberg
13. Countess Anna Sophie of Königsegg-Rothenfels
3. Princess Maria Henriette Josepha of Fürstenberg-Stühlingen
14. Johann Joseph, Count of Waldstein-Wartenberg
7. Countess Theresia Anna Maria Eleanore of Waldstein-Wartenberg
15. Countess Eleonore Maria of Waldstein-Wartenberg
