= Alexander Ferdinand, 3rd Prince of Thurn and Taxis =

Prince of Thurn and Taxis (1704–1773)

Alexander Ferdinand
- Prince of Thurn and Taxis
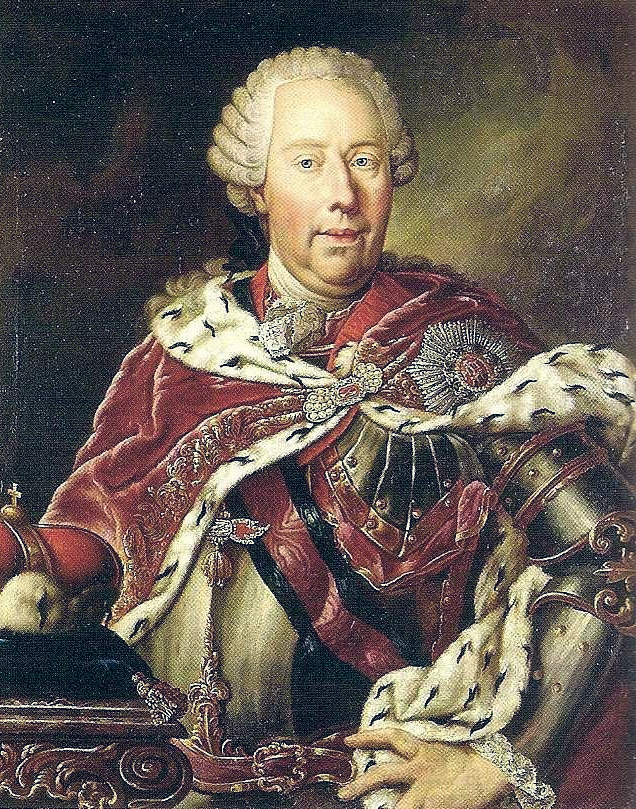
- Portrait by an unknown artist, c. 1760

Prince of Thurn and Taxis
- Period: 8 November 1739 – 17 March 1773
- Predecessor: Anselm Franz
- Successor: Karl Anselm
- Born: 21 March 1704; Frankfurt am Main, Free Imperial City of Frankfurt, Holy Roman Empire
- Died: 17 March 1773 (aged 68); Regensburg, Free Imperial City of Regensburg, Holy Roman Empire
- Spouse: Margravine Sophie Christine of Brandenburg-Bayreuth; Princess Charlotte Louise of Lorraine; Princess Maria Henriette Josepha of Fürstenberg-Stühlingen
- Issue: Princess Sophie Christine; Karl Anselm, 4th Prince of Thurn and Taxis; Princess Luise Auguste Charlotte; Prince Friedrich August; Prince Ludwig Franz; Princess Maria Theresia; Princess Josephine; Prince Heinrich Alexander; Prince Franz Joseph; Princess Maria Anna Josepha; Princess Marie Elisabetha Alexandrina; Prince Maximilian Joseph
Names
- German: Alexander Ferdinand
- House: House of Thurn and Taxis
- Father: Anselm Franz, 2nd Prince of Thurn and Taxis
- Mother: Maria Ludovika Anna Franziska, Princess of Lobkowicz

Alexander Ferdinand, 3rd Prince of Thurn and Taxis, full German name: Alexander Ferdinand Fürst von Thurn und Taxis (21 March 1704 – 17 March 1773) was the third Prince of Thurn and Taxis, Postmaster General of the Imperial Reichspost, and Head of the Princely House of Thurn and Taxis from 8 November 1739 until his death on 17 March 1773. Alexander Ferdinand served as Principal Commissioner (German: Prinzipalkommissar) at the Perpetual Imperial Diet in Frankfurt am Main and Regensburg for Charles VII, Holy Roman Emperor, Francis I, Holy Roman Emperor, and Joseph II, Holy Roman Emperor from 1 February 1743 to 1745 and again from 1748 until 1773.

== Early life ==
Alexander Ferdinand was the eldest child and only son of Anselm Franz, 2nd Prince of Thurn and Taxis and his wife Maria Ludovika Anna Franziska, Princess of Lobkowicz (1683-1750).

== Principal Commissioner ==
From 1 February 1743 to 1745, Alexander Ferdinand served as Principal Commissioner for Charles VII, Holy Roman Emperor at the Perpetual Imperial Diet in Frankfurt am Main. When the Diet relocated to Regensburg under Francis I, Holy Roman Emperor, Alexander Ferdinand was reinstated as Principal Commissioner in 1748. It was for this reason that Alexander Ferdinand moved the principal residence of the Princely House of Thurn and Taxis from Frankfurt am Main to Regensburg. On 30 May 1754, Alexander Ferdinand was added to the College of Imperial Princes.

== Marriages and family ==
A proposed bride was Johanna of Baden-Baden (1704–1726), only surviving daughter of the late Margrave of Baden-Baden and his wife (Regent of Baden-Baden from 1707) Sibylle of Saxe-Lauenburg, but the match never materialized.

Alexander Ferdinand married Margravine Sophie Christine of Brandenburg-Bayreuth, eldest daughter of George Frederick Charles, Margrave of Brandenburg-Bayreuth and his wife Princess Dorothea of Schleswig-Holstein-Sonderburg-Beck, on 11 April 1731 in Frankfurt am Main. Alexander Ferdinand and Sophie Christine had five children:

- Princess Sophie Christine of Thurn and Taxis (baptized 8 December 1731 – 23 December 1731)
- Karl Anselm, 4th Prince of Thurn and Taxis (2 June 1733 – 13 November 1805)

∞ 3 September 1753 Duchess Auguste of Württemberg (30 October 1734 – 4 June 1787)
∞ 1787 Elisabeth Hildebrand, Frau von Train

- Princess Luise Auguste Charlotte of Thurn and Taxis (27 October 1734 – January 1735)
- Prince Friedrich August of Thurn and Taxis (baptized 5 December 1736 – 12 September 1755)
- Prince Ludwig Franz Karl Lamoral Joseph of Thurn and Taxis (13 October 1737 – 7 August 1738)

Alexander Ferdinand married secondly Princess Louise de Lorraine (1722-1747), third eldest daughter of Louis, Prince of Lambesc and his wife Jeanne Henriette de Durfort (1691-1750), on 22 March 1745 in Paris, but she died January 6, 1747, without issue.

Alexander Ferdinand married thirdly Princess Maria Henriette Josepha of Fürstenberg-Stühlingen (1732-1772), daughter of Joseph Wilhelm Ernst, Prince of Fürstenberg and his wife Countess Theresia Anna Maria Eleonore of Waldstein-Wartenberg (1707-1756), on 21 September 1750 in Regensburg. Alexander Ferdinand and Maria Henriette Josepha had seven children:

- Princess Maria Theresia of Thurn and Taxis (born 16 January 1755 – 20 December 1810)

∞ 20 August 1780 Ferdinand, Count of Ahlefeldt-Langeland (9 May 1747 - 28 September 1815)

- Princess Josephine of Thurn and Taxis (born 1 August 1759; died at young age)
- Prince Heinrich Alexander of Thurn and Taxis (baptized 14 September 1762; died at young age)
- Prince Franz Joseph of Thurn and Taxis (2 October 1764; buried 20 February 1765)
- Princess Maria Anna Josepha of Thurn and Taxis (baptized 28 Sep 1766 – 10 August 1805)
- Princess Marie Elisabetha Alexandrina of Thurn and Taxis (30 November 1767 – 21 July 1822)

∞ 4 November 1790 Karl Joseph, Landgrave of Fürstenberg (26 June 1760 – 25 March 1799)
∞ Joseph, Baron of Lasaberg (died 15 March 1855)

- Prince Maximilian Joseph of Thurn and Taxis (9 May 1769 – 15 May 1831)

∞ 6 June 1791 Princess Eleonore of Lobkowicz (22 April 1770 – 9 November 1834)
from this marriage the Czech branch of the House of Thurn and Taxis descends

== Ancestry ==
Ancestors of Alexander Ferdinand, 3rd Prince of Thurn and Taxis

8. Lamoral II Claudius Franz, Count of Thurn and Taxis
4. Eugen Alexander Franz, 1st Prince of Thurn and Taxis
9. Countess Anne Francoise Eugénie of Hornes
2. Anselm Franz, 2nd Prince of Thurn and Taxis
10. Herman Egon, Landgrave of Fürstenberg
5. Princess Anna Adelheid of Fürstenberg
11. Countess Franziska of Fürstenberg-Stühlingen
1. Alexander Ferdinand, 3rd Prince of Thurn and Taxis
12. Václav Eusebius František, Prince of Lobkowicz
6. Ferdinand August Leopold, Prince of Lobkowicz, Duke of Sagan
13. Countess Palatine Augusta Sophie of Sulzbach
3. Princess Maria Ludovika of Lobkowicz
14. Wilhelm, Margrave of Baden-Baden
7. Margravine Maria Anna Wilhelmine of Baden-Baden
15. Countess Maria Magdalene of Oettingen

Alexander Ferdinand, 3rd Prince of Thurn and Taxis House of Thurn and Taxis Cadet branch of the House of Tassis Born: 21 March 1704 Died: 17 March 1773
German nobility
| Preceded by Anselm Franz | Prince of Thurn and Taxis; 8 November 1739 – 17 March 1773 | Succeeded by Karl Anselm |
Postal offices
| Preceded by Anselm Franz | Postmaster General of the Holy Roman Empire; 8 November 1739 – 17 March 1773 | Succeeded by Karl Anselm |
