= Alexandrine von Taxis =

German noblewoman, postmaster, and founder of the House of Thurn and Taxis (1589–1666)

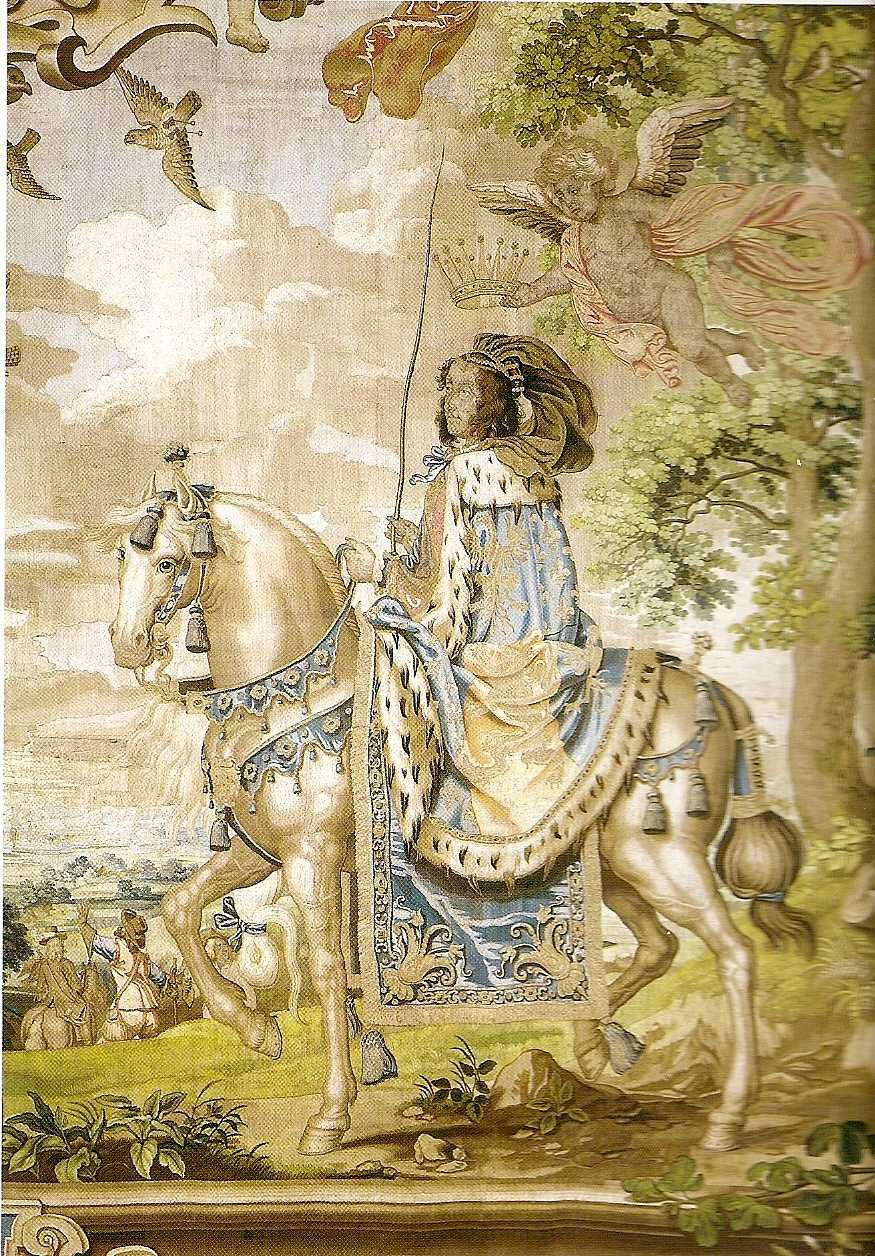
Alexandrine von Taxis

Alexandrine von Taxis (1 August 1589 – 26 December 1666), was a German noblewoman who served as Imperial General Postmaster of the Kaiserliche Reichspost, the General Post Office of the Holy Roman Empire, as well as the Post Master of the Spanish Netherlands, from 1628 until 1646.

== Early life ==
She was born as the second child and only daughter of Philibert de Rye, Count de Varax (d. 1597) and Claudine de Tournon-Roussillon (d. 1586), daughter of Claudine de la Tour-Turenne.

== Marriage and issue ==
She was married to Count Leonhard II von Taxis (1594-1628). When he died, she took over his office until her son Lamoral II Claudius Franz, Count of Thurn and Taxis was old enough and educated enough to take office. She and her husband were progenitors of the House of Thurn und Taxis.

== See also ==
- Gese Wechel, Swedish equivalent
- Dorothea Krag, Danish equivalent
