= Imperial Post =

The Imperial Post, Imperial Post Office, or Imperial Postal Service may refer to:

- The Kaiserliche Reichspost of the Holy Roman Empire
- The Thurn-und-Taxis Post, its successor
- The Chinese Imperial Post of the late Qing Dynasty in China, administered by the Chinese Maritime Customs Service
- The Russian Post before 1917
- The British General Post Office before the mid-20th century
- The India Post under the British Raj
