= Lamoral II Claudius Franz, Count of Thurn and Taxis =

German nobleman and Imperial Postmaster (1621–1676)

Lamoral II Claudius Franz
- Count of Thurn and Taxis
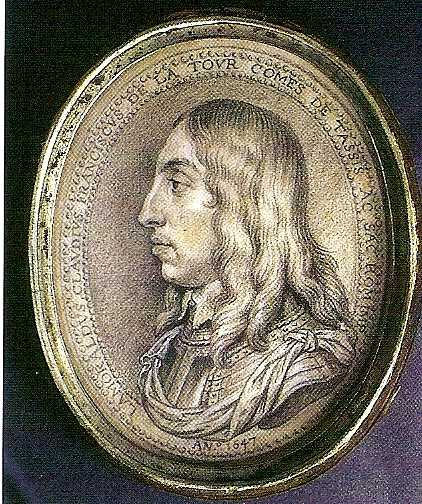
- Born: 1621; Brussels
- Died: 13 December 1676; Antwerp
- Noble family: Thurn und Taxis
- Spouse: Anna Franziska Eugenia of Horne
- Father: Leonhard II, Count of Taxis
- Mother: Alexandrine de Rye, Comtesse de Varax

Lamoral II Claudius Franz, Count of Thurn and Taxis (14 February 1621 (baptized) – 13 September 1676) was a German nobleman and Imperial Postmaster. He took over the post of Imperial Postmaster General from his mother when he came of age in 1646. He obtained permission from the Emperor in 1650 to change his family name to von Thurn, Valsassina und Taxis, but then opted for the shorter von Thurn und Taxis (or de la Tour et Tassis in French). He and his mother were instrumental in the organization of the Imperial postal system. After the end of the Thirty Years' War, he successfully competed against the many postal systems of the German states. He was, however, unable to regain a legal monopoly. He also participated in the negotiations that led to the Treaty of Westphalia.

== Life ==
=== Youth ===
Lamoral II Claudius Franz was born in Brussels, the only son of Leonhard II, Count of Taxis and Alexandrine de Rye, Comtesse de Varax. His father died unexpectedly in 1628, when he was seven years old and he inherited the posts of Imperial Postmaster General and Postmaster of the Spanish Netherlands. Until he came of age, his mother acted as his guardian and provided him with a thorough education, teaching him about the postal sector and languages, including Dutch, French, German, Italian, Latin and Spanish.

=== Activities until the Peace of Westphalia ===
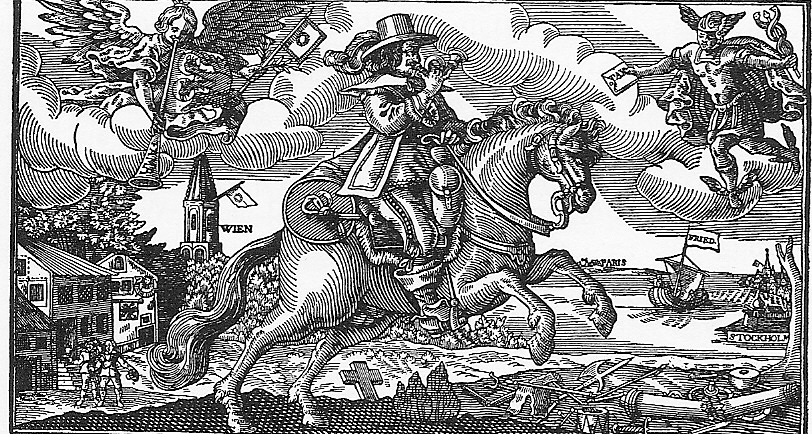
Post rider of the imperial post as ambassador of the Peace of Westphalia in 1648

Lamoral Claudius Francis began acting as Postmaster General when he came of age, at the age of 25, signing documents himself, even before he was officially appointed. One of his first acts in office was his confirmation of the appointment of his cousin John Baptista of Taxis as Postmaster in Augsburg on 27 February 1646. Lamoral Claudius Francis was confirmed as Postmaster General by Emperor Ferdinand III on 11 September 1646.

Towards the end of the Thirty Years' War, during the peace negotiations in Osnabrück and Münster, he set up a postal courier link between Detmold and Osnabrück and one between Osnabrück and Bückeburg. He also set up a postal route from Cologne via Lünen to Münster and a route from Münster to Osnabrück. He continued to operate the route his mother had set up from Cologne via Roermond to Brussels. After the Peace of Westphalia, he was responsible for shifting the postal service from Innsbruck to Brussels back to its traditional route.

=== Name change ===
The counts of Taxis appeared to be descended from the low nobility. However, genealogical research initiated by his mother suggested they might have descended from the Italian patrician House of Della Torre (also known as Torriano), former rulers of Milan. Based on this research, the Taxis family wanted to change their name to "Tour and Taxis". Already in the first documents he signed in 1646, he called himself Lamoral Claudius Francißcus de la Tour, Count of Taxis, although his name change was not approved by the emperor until 1650. Following up on his mother's initiative, he commissioned the genealogist Engelbert Flacchie in 1647 to write a book on the dynastic history of the house of Taxis. This book was published in 1709 by his son and successor, Eugen Alexander.

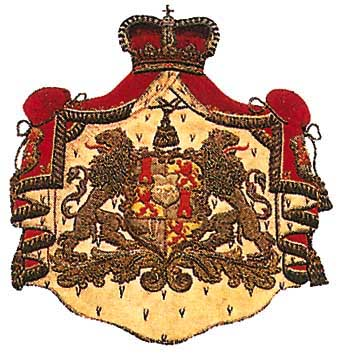
Thurn and Taxis coat of arms

On 6 October 1649, King Philip IV of Spain recognized the descent of the Taxis family from the Della Torre family. Emperor Ferdinand III allowed the name change on 24 December 1650. In 1653, the House of Thurn and Taxis replaced the imperial eagle in their coat of arms with the tower of the Della Torre. They kept the badger in the heart shield.

=== Construction activities and acquisition of land ===
Lamoral Claudius Francis struggled all his life to an appreciation and social advancement of his family with the ranks of nobility. His construction projects were included in this effort. He ordered a redesign in baroque style of the family crypt which Francis of Taxis had constructed in the Church of Our Lady of Victories at the Sablon in Brussels. Around 1660, he constructed the summer residence and Lustschloss Beaulieu outside Brussels. He expanded his city residence opposite the Church of Our Lady of the Sablon into a magnificent palace. In order to possess estates befitting his station, he purchased the Lordships of Braine-le-Château and Haut-Ittre in Hainaut from the relatives of his wife. He already held the Lordship of La Roche-en-Ardenne. Despite these efforts, only his son Eugen Alexander managed to be raised to Spanish and Imperial Prince.

=== Activities as Postmaster General ===
On 2 December 1649, Lamoral Claudius was granted an imperial patent, which entitled him to set up post stations anywhere in the Holy Roman Empire. The operation of the imperial Post had been considered as a fief since 1615. Lamoral exerted himself personally to look after the external relations of the Post and for its recognition as an imperia fief. He visited the Diet of Regensburg to campaign for the expansion of the postal network under his leadership. At the election of Emperor Leopold I, Lamoral was present as an imperial vassal.

On 13 February 1664, he concluded a contract with Elector Ferdinand Maria of Bavaria, to establish new postal routes from Munich to Augsburg, Innsbruck, Regensburg, Wels and Salzburg. On 13 February 1672, he concluded a contract with Archbishop Karl Kaspar von der Leyen of Trier to establish a postal route from Trier to Koblenz.

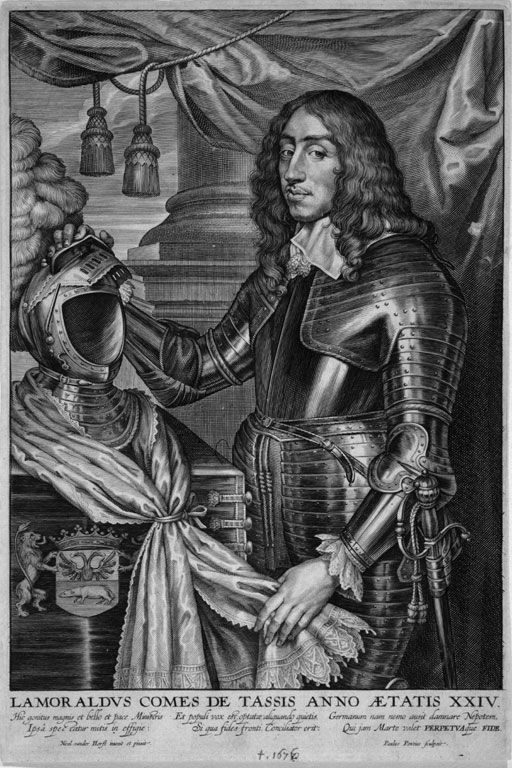
Portrait of Lamoral II Claudius Franz, Count of Thurn and Taxis engraved by Paulus Pontius after design by Nicolaas van der Horst

In 1672, postal routes had to be rerouted, due to the outbreak of the Franco-Dutch War. In 1675, postal workers were attacked by French mercenaries while travelling through the Archbishopric of Trier with a Salvaguardia. Lamoral complained to Louis XIV, but received a negative response from the French Minister of War and Postal Affairs Le Tellier de Louvois. From the Emperor, he obtained a decree to better protect the neutrality of the postal stations.

Lamoral died in Antwerp, aged 55.

=== Competition ===
During the Thirty Years' War and in particular during the peace negotiations in Münster and Osnabrück, the Protestant rulers had put some effort in setting up an independent postal system using the relay system. In theory, the Imperial postal system held a legal monopoly, which had been granted by Emperor Rudolph II in 1597. However, the Protestant rulers argued that the Habsburg Archdukes operated their own independent "Court Post" system, which had been recognized by Lamoral Claudius Franz's grandfather Lamoral of Taxis. After the Peace of Westphalia, some powerful Protestant rulers, such as the Electors of Brandenburg and Saxony, the Landgraves of Hesse-Kassel and the Dukes of Brunswick-Lüneburg, began setting up independent postal systems in their territories. Lamoral II Claudius Franz, the Imperial Postmaster General, tried in vain to counter this development. At a conference of Protestant rulers in Hildesheim in 1658, the rulers decided to a common approach towards the claims of the House of Taxis. Lamoral II Claudius Franz again argued that their postal systems were illegal under Rudolph's monopoly decree from 1597. However, he did not prevail and after lengthy negotiations, he had to accept the existence of competitors and he lost several postal routes to these new competitors. During another conference on postal issues in 1666, again in Hildesheim, a definitive demarcation of spheres of interest was agreed.

During his tenure, Lamoral II Claudius Franz was committed to strengthening the postal organization and meeting the needs to the individual post offices. He was an indefatigable letter writer. Thousands of drafts of his letters have been preserved in the Princely Thurn and Taxis Archive in Regensburg. He was also a tough negotiator. Elector Frederick William of Brandenburg complained in a letter to Emperor Leopold I: "... that the Count of Taxis should really be kept under control".

== Marriage and issue ==
He married on 6 February 1650 Countess Anna Franziska Eugenia of Hornes (d. 25 June 1693), the daughter of Count Philip Lamoral of Hornes and Houtekerke (d. 1654) and his wife, Princess Dorothée Jeanne d'Arenberg (d. 1665). From this marriage, he had the following children:

- Eugen Alexander (baptized 11 January 1652 – 21 February 1714), succeeded him as Postmaster General
- Inigo Lamoral (baptized 6 November 1653 – 1 October 1713), General of the Cavalry, married Countess Claudia Franziska Fugger von Nordendorg
- Franz Sigismund (30 January 1655 – 19 January 1710), Captain General and Governor of Liege, married Countess Anna-Hyacintha d'Ursel
- Genoveva Ernestina Maria (baptized 26 November 1657 – 1686), married Martin Gutierrez de los Rios, Captain of the Spanish guard
- Anton Alexander (baptized 3 July 1662 – 6 June 1683), soldier, killed in battle before Neuhäsel

These children died young:

- Philip Leopold (18 November 1650 – 10 June 1657)
- Unnamed son (1656–1656)
- Isabella Maria (baptized 3 September 1660 – November 1671)
- Maria Theresia (baptized 7 Mai 1663 – before 28 October 1673)

== Footnotes ==
Lamoral II Claudius Franz, Count of Thurn and Taxis Thurn und Taxis Born: 1621 Died: 13 September 1676
Preceded by Alexandrine	Postmaster General of the Holy Roman Empire; 1646-1676	Succeeded by Eugen Alexander
