= Eugen Alexander Franz, 1st Prince of Thurn and Taxis =

Prince of Thurn and Taxis (1652–1714)

Eugen Alexander Franz
- Prince of Thurn and Taxis
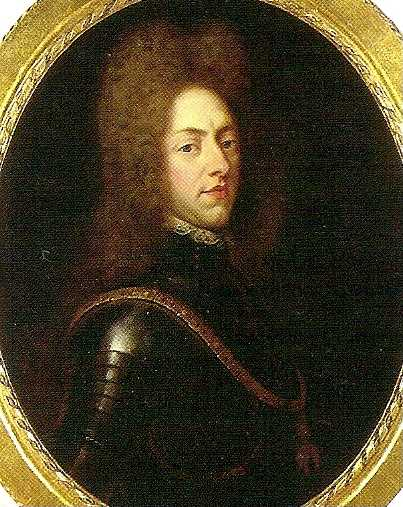

Count of Thurn and Taxis
- Period: 13 September 1676–1695
- Predecessor: Lamoral II Claudius Franz
- Successor: himself as Prince

Prince of Thurn and Taxis
- Period: 1695 – 21 February 1714
- Predecessor: himself as Count
- Successor: Anselm Franz
- Born: 11 January 1652 (date of baptism); Brussels, Spanish Netherlands (place of baptism)
- Died: 21 February 1714 (aged 62); Frankfurt am Main, Free Imperial City of Frankfurt, Holy Roman Empire
- Spouse: Princess Anna Adelheid of Fürstenberg-Heiligenberg; Countess Anna Augusta of Hohenlohe-Waldenburg-Schillingsfürst
- Issue: Countess Dorothea; Anselm Franz, 2nd Prince of Thurn and Taxis; Count Jakob Lamoral; Count Heinrich Franz; Countess Anna Franziska; Countess Eleonora Ferdinanda; Count Inigo Lamoral; Countess Anna Theresia; Countess Maria Elisabeth; Prince Lothar Franz; Prince Maximilian Philipp; Prince Philipp Lamoral; Princess Maria Josepha
Names
- German: Eugen Alexander Franz
- House: Thurn und Taxis
- Father: Lamoral II Claudius Franz, Count of Thurn and Taxis
- Mother: Countess Anna Franziska Eugenia of Horn

Eugen Alexander Franz, 1st Prince of Thurn and Taxis, full German name: Eugen Alexander Franz Fürst von Thurn und Taxis (baptized 11 January 1652 – 21 February 1714) was the first Prince of Thurn and Taxis, Postmaster General of the Kaiserliche Reichspost, and Head of the House of Thurn and Taxis from 13 September 1676 until his death.

== Early life ==
Eugen Alexander Franz was the second son of Lamoral II Claudius Franz, Count of Thurn and Taxis and his wife Countess Anna Franziska Eugenia of Horn. The date of his birth is unknown, but Eugen Alexander Franz was baptised on 11 January 1652 in Brussels.

== Postmaster General ==
After the death of his father, Eugen Alexander Franz succeeded to the positions of Postmaster General of the Imperial Reichspost and the Spanish Netherlands. In 1681, the last Habsburg King of Spain Charles II appointed Eugen Alexander Franz from a count to a prince, and Leopold I, Holy Roman Emperor made him an Imperial prince in 1695.

After the French occupation of the Spanish Netherlands during the War of the Spanish Succession, the new Spanish King Philip V, grandson of Louis XIV of France, deposed Eugen Alexander Franz as Post Master General of the Spanish Netherlands. In 1702, he moved his postal system's headquarters from Brussels to Frankfurt am Main where it originated.

== Marriage and issue ==
Eugen Alexander Franz was married twice. He married first to Princess Anna Adelheid of Fürstenberg-Heiligenberg, youngest daughter and child of Hermann Egon, Count of Fürstenberg-Heiligenberg and his wife Countess Franziska of Fürstenberg-Stühlingen. Eugen Alexander Franz and Anna Adelheid had the following children:

- Countess Dorothea of Thurn and Taxis (born and died in 1679)
- a son whose name is unknown (born and died in 1680)
- Anselm Franz, 2nd Prince of Thurn and Taxis (1681–1739) married Maria Ludovika Anna Franziska, Princess of Lobkowicz
- Count Jakob Lamoral of Thurn and Taxis (?-?)
- Count Heinrich Franz of Thurn and Taxis (born and died in 1682)
- Countess Anna Franziska of Thurn and Taxis (1683–1763) married Franz Ernst, Count and Altgrave of Salm-Reifferscheidt
- Countess Eleonora Ferdinanda of Thurn and Taxis (born and died in 1685)
- Count Inigo Lamoral Maria Felix Franz of Thurn and Taxis (1686–1717), soldier, died at siege of Belgrade.
- Countess Anna Theresia of Thurn and Taxis (born and died in 1689)
- Countess Maria Elisabeth of Thurn and Taxis (born and died in 1691)

After the death of his first wife, Eugen Alexander Franz married Countess Anna Augusta of Hohenlohe-Waldenburg-Schillingsfürst, daughter of Ludwig Gustav, Count of Hohenlohe-Waldenburg-Schillingsfürst and his second wife Anna Barbara von Schönborn. Eugen Alexander Franz and Anna Augusta had the following children:

- Prince Lothar Franz of Thurn and Taxis (1705–1712)
- Prince Maximilian Philipp of Thurn and Taxis (born and died in 1706)
- Prince Philipp Lamoral of Thurn and Taxis (born and died in 1708)
- Princess Maria Josepha of Thurn and Taxis (born and died in 1711)

== Honours ==
- Knight of the Austrian Order of the Golden Fleece

== Sources ==
- Wolfgang Behringer, Thurn und Taxis, Piper, München/Zürich 1990 ISBN 3-492-03336-9
- Martin Dallmeier, Quellen zur Geschichte des europäischen Postwesens 1501–1806, Teil II, Urkunden-Regesten, Verlag Michael Lassleben, Kallmünz 1977
- Martin Dallmeier, in: De post van Thurn und Taxis, La Poste des Tour et Tassis 1489–1794, Brüssel 1982
- Europäische Stammtafeln Band V, Haus Thurn und Taxis, Tafel 129 und 130

Eugen Alexander Franz, 1st Prince of Thurn and Taxis House of Thurn and Taxis Cadet branch of the House of Tassis Born: 1652 Died: 21 February 1714
German nobility
Preceded by Lamoral II Claudius Franz	Count of Thurn and Taxis; 13 September 1676–1695	Succeeded by himself as Prince
Preceded by himself as Count	Prince of Thurn and Taxis; 1695 – 21 February 1714	Succeeded by Anselm Franz
Postal offices
Preceded by Lamoral II Claudius Franz	Postmaster General of the Holy Roman Empire; 13 September 1676 – 21 February 1714	Succeeded by Anselm Franz
