= Perpetual Diet of Regensburg =

Imperial Diet of the HRE (1663–1806)

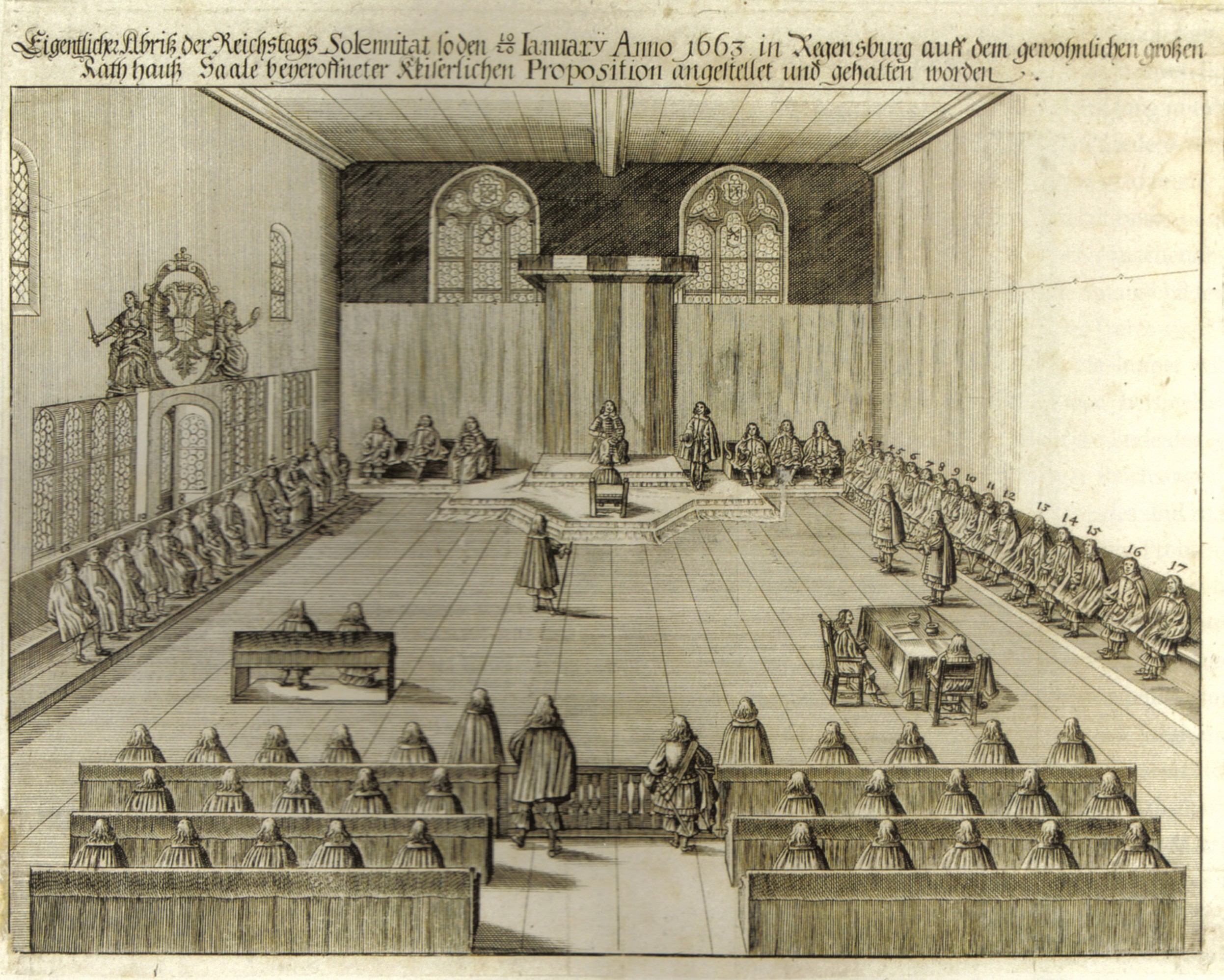
- The Perpetual Diet in Regensburg in 1663 (copper engraving)

Overview
- Legislative body: Imperial Diet
- Meeting place: Regensburg
- Term: 1663 – 1806

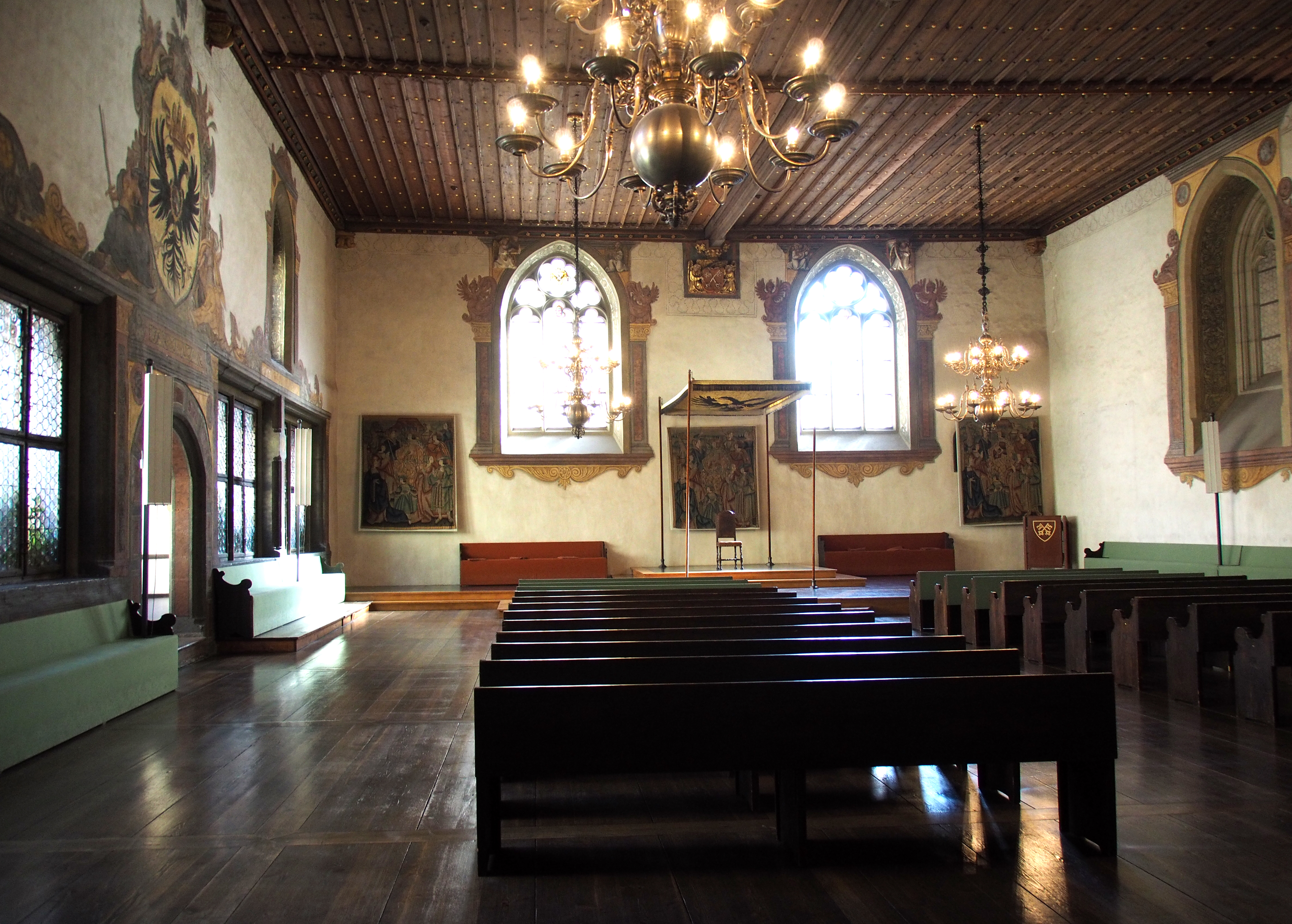
The meeting place of the Diet in the Old Town Hall of Regensburg, as pictured in 2016

The Perpetual Diet of Regensburg or the Eternal Diet of Regensburg, (Note: The diet is also referred to as the "Perpetual/Eternal Diet in Regensburg/Ratisbon" and the "Perpetual/Eternal Imperial Diet" or simply the "Perpetual/Eternal Diet".) (German: Immerwährender Reichstag) also commonly called in English the Perpetual Diet of Ratisbon, from the city's Latin name, was a session of the Imperial Diet (Reichstag) of the Holy Roman Empire that sat continuously from 1663 to 1806 in Regensburg in present-day Bavaria, Germany.

== History ==
Previously, the Diet had been convened in different cities but, beginning in 1594, it met only in the town hall in Regensburg. On 20 January 1663, the Diet convened to deal with threats from the Ottoman Empire (the Turkish Question). Since the Peace of Westphalia in 1648, the Holy Roman Emperor had been formally bound to accept all decisions made by the Diet. Hence, out of fear that the Emperor would disregard the Diet's role by not calling sessions, it never dissolved and became a perpetual diet. Therefore, no final report of its decisions, known as a Recess, could be issued, and that of the preceding diet, issued in 1654, was dubbed the Youngest Recess. From 1663 until the 1684 Truce of Ratisbon (a former name of Regensburg in English), the diet gradually developed into a permanent body.

In addition to envoys who represented the Imperial Estates in the Diet, Regensburg had around 70 representatives (Komitialgesandtern or Comitia) from foreign states. The Emperor was represented by a Principal Commissioner (Prinzipalkommissar), a position that accrued to the Thurn und Taxis family from 1748.

The last action of the Diet, on 25 March 1803, was the passage of the German Mediatisation, which reorganized and secularized the Empire. Following the approval of that final constitutional document, the Diet never met again and its existence ended with the dissolution of the Empire in 1806.

== List of imperial principal commissioners ==
Dates	Commissioner
1663–1668	Guidobald of Thun, Archbishop of Salzburg (1616–1668)
1668	David von Weißenwolf
1668–1685	Count Marquard II Schenk von Castell, Bishop of Eichstätt (1605–1685)
1685–1687	Count Sebastian of Pötting, Bishop of Passau (1628–1689)
1688–1691	Margrave Hermann of Baden-Baden (1628–1691)
1692–1700	Prince Ferdinand August of Lobkowitz, Duke of Sagan (1655–1715)
1700–1712	Cardinal John Philip of Lamberg, Bishop of Passau (1652–1712)
1712–1716	Prince Maximilian Karl of Löwenstein-Wertheim-Rochefort (1656–1718)
1716–1725	Cardinal Christian August of Saxe-Zeitz, Archbishop of Esztergom (Gran) and Primate of Hungary (1666–1725)
1726–1735	Prince Frobenius Ferdinand of Fürstenberg-Messkirch (1664–1741)
1735–1741	Prince Joseph William of Fürstenberg-Stühlingen (1699–1762)
1741–1745	Prince Alexander Ferdinand of Thurn and Taxis (1704–1773)
1745–1748	Prince Joseph William of Fürstenberg-Stühlingen (1699–1762)
1748–1773	Alexander Ferdinand of Thurn and Taxis (1704–1773) (2nd term)
1773–1797	Prince Karl Anselm of Thurn and Taxis (1733–1805)
1797–1806	Prince Karl Alexander of Thurn and Taxis (1770–1827)

== See also ==
- List of Reichstag participants (1792)
