= Janetto de Tassis =

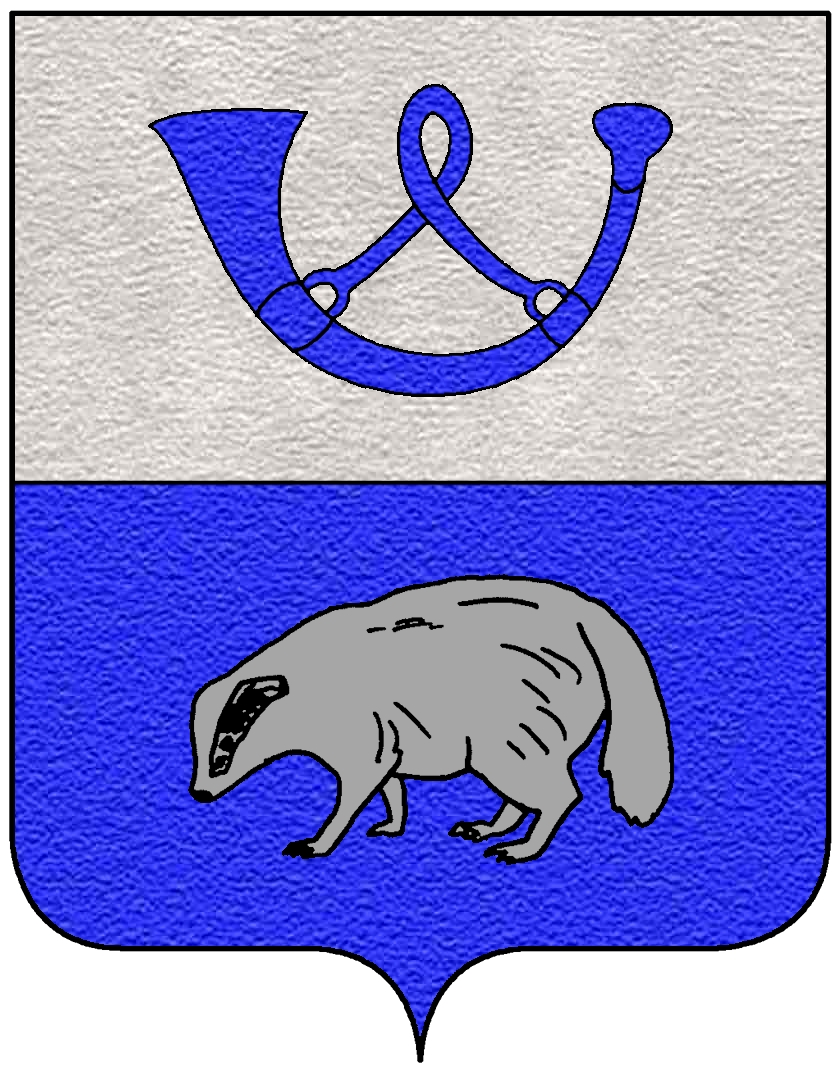
- Coat of arms of the Tasso family
- Born: 1450; Camerata Cornello, near Bergamo
- Died: c. 1518; Pisino, Istria
- Occupations: Courier, postmaster

Janetto de Tassis (1450 – 1517 or 1518) also Tasso, and also known as Johann Daxen, Jenne de Taschen was an Italian postmaster and courier. He came from the noble Italian family of Tasso, who were in the service of the Venetians and the Pope. After the takeover of Tyrol by Holy Roman Emperor Maximilian I in 1490, he entered Maximilian's service to organize postal and courier routes to Italy, France and the Burgundian Netherlands (Kaiserliche Reichspost). He served Maximilian from 1490 to 1506 as a master courier before retiring to his possessions in Istria. In 1508, after the Venetians conquered Istria, he sided with them to save his lands. He was confined in Pisino as a deserter upon Maximilian's reconquest of Istria in 1509. In 1515 he made his will in Pisino, and died there a few years later, probably around 1517 or 1518.

== Biography ==
=== Activity ===
He was a son of Alessandro de Tassis, who had made a name for himself with the organization of the Maestri dei Corrieri, the papal courier service. Since entering the service of Maximilian, De Tassis was procurator general of the family and society of Tassi (Italian: procuratore generale della famiglia e società di Tassi), which meant something like head of the family.

The first mention of Janetto de Tassis and the post office is in the Tiroler Raitbucher (Innsbruck account books) of the year 1489 with the date of the Friday after December 8:

Johannetn Daxen Obristen postmaister am Freitag nach Conceptionis Mariae

durch Waptistum (=Giovanni Battista) seinen Vettern (=Neffen, nephew)

zu notturft der post:auff sein Quittung 300 Gulden.

The given date is disputed by most postal historians, including Wolfgang Behringer, with various chronological arguments, mainly because Maximilian I did not take over Tyrol until March 1490.

According to the Raitbüchern, most of the postal payments went to De Tassis up to the beginning of 1492, after which the Innsbruck Court Chamber stopped making payments. In 1492 he received compensation from the Fuggers in Augsburg. From 1493/4 to 1498, De Tassis worked almost exclusively as a courier master, i.e. a leading organizer in the postal service. The Felleisen relays from Innsbruck to the various courts in the empire, on the other hand, were in charge of Sebastian Meurl until May 1499. Only the relays to Innsbruck and the Reichstag, paid for by Ludovico Sforza from Milan, continued to be organized by Janetto. Since there were renewed payment difficulties, Maximilian pledged toll revenues to his courier master De Tassis between 1494 and 1498.

=== The retreat into private life ===
In 1504 Maximilian I lent a castle and lands in Istria to De Tassis to pay off outstanding debts. He was invested of the castle Rachele in 1504, for his "service to the House of Habsburg in his capacity as postmaster". Initially, his nephew Giovanni Battista took over the administration of these properties in Castelnuovo (so-called Rachele, Rakalj) and Barban.

Through the mediation of Janetto, Gabriele de Tassis, a relative of his, became head of the Innsbruck post office in 1504. At first he worked exclusively with the Burgundian postmaster Francesco de Tassis, his brother, in Mechelen, organizing the so-called "Post of Flanders" between the court of Maximilian and that of Philip the Handsome in Mechelen and Brussels, but from 1505 he organized the first Felleisen postal courses for Maximilian, which he financed. From now on, De Tassis gradually withdrew from the postal and courier business. On 29 March 1505 Maximilian met Janetto in Hagenau, to organize with him a new postal route that would easily connect Innsbruck, Vienna and Budapest (then known as Ofen). He organized for this route a complex postal transport system, even for large loads. On 27 November 1506, he received from Maximilian I the sum of 1,363 gulden for the construction of a postal route from Konstanz to Mechelen.

After that, Janetto retired to his castle in Istria. As a result, Maximilian demanded the return of his nephew Giovanni Battista and made him his new master courier.

=== Imprisonment in Pisino and death ===
After Maximilian had proclaimed himself Emperor with the title of “Elected Emperor” in Trento on 4 February 1508 with the consent of the Pope, an eight-year struggle for northern Italy broke out. The main opponent was Venice. On 2 March 1508, the imperial army under Maximilian suffered a defeat. The Venetians conquered Gorizia, Trieste, Istria and Fiume and threatened Tyrol and Carinthia. Janetto de Tassis got caught between the fronts. After the Venetians conquered Istria in March 1508 and confiscated his possessions, he sided with Venice to save his lands. In a petition to the Venice Signoria he claimed to have been in the service of the Habsburgs for 20 years and asked for the return of his Istrian goods. Maximilian had him captured as a deserter during the reconquest of Istria, and De Tassis remained imprisoned in Pisino until his death. On 12 September 1515, having become in molesta et longa infermità he made a priest wrote his testament in Pisino. There are different statements in the literature about his date of death. He probably died two years later, at least before 8 September 1518.

Only in 1524, on the recommendation of Charles V, did De Tassis' heirs regain the right to dispose of his possessions in Venice.
