= Anselm Franz, 2nd Prince of Thurn and Taxis =

Prince of Thurn and Taxis (1681–1739)

Anselm Franz
- Prince of Thurn and Taxis
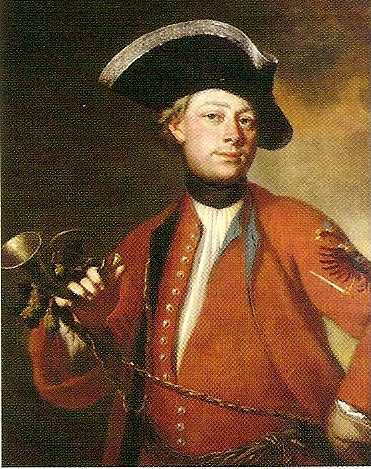
- Portrait by Petr Brandl, c. 1700–1714

Prince of Thurn and Taxis
- Period: 21 February 1714 – 8 November 1739
- Predecessor: Eugen Alexander Franz
- Successor: Alexander Ferdinand
- Born: 30 January 1681 (date of baptism); Brussels, Spanish Netherlands (place of baptism)
- Died: 8 November 1739 (aged 58); Brussels, Austrian Netherlands
- Spouse: Maria Ludovika Anna Franziska, Princess of Lobkowicz
- Issue: Alexander Ferdinand, 3rd Prince of Thurn and Taxis; Princess Maria Philippine Eleonore; Maria Augusta, Duchess of Württemberg; Prince Christian Adam Egon
Names
- German: Anselm Franz
- House: Thurn and Taxis
- Father: Eugen Alexander Franz, 1st Prince of Thurn and Taxis
- Mother: Princess Anna Adelheid of Fürstenberg-Heiligenberg

Anselm Franz, 2nd Prince of Thurn and Taxis, (30 January 1681 – 8 November 1739) was the second Prince of Thurn and Taxis, Postmaster General of the Imperial Reichspost, and Head of the House of Thurn and Taxis from 21 February 1714 until his death on 8 November 1739.

== Early life ==
Anselm Franz was the eldest child and son of Eugen Alexander Franz, 1st Prince of Thurn and Taxis and his wife Princess Anna Adelheid of Fürstenberg-Heiligenberg. The date of his birth is unknown, but Anselm Franz was baptised on 30 January 1681 in the Church of Our Lady of Victories at the Sablon in Brussels.

== Origin of the Postal Company ==
The Thurn & Taxis Postal operations go back to Omodeo Tasso (1245 est - 1309) who founded a Courrier Service in Cornello in the Italian Alps around 1290. The settlement of Cornello dei Tasso still exist. A Postal Museum, the Museo dei Tasso traces back the historic postal heritage.

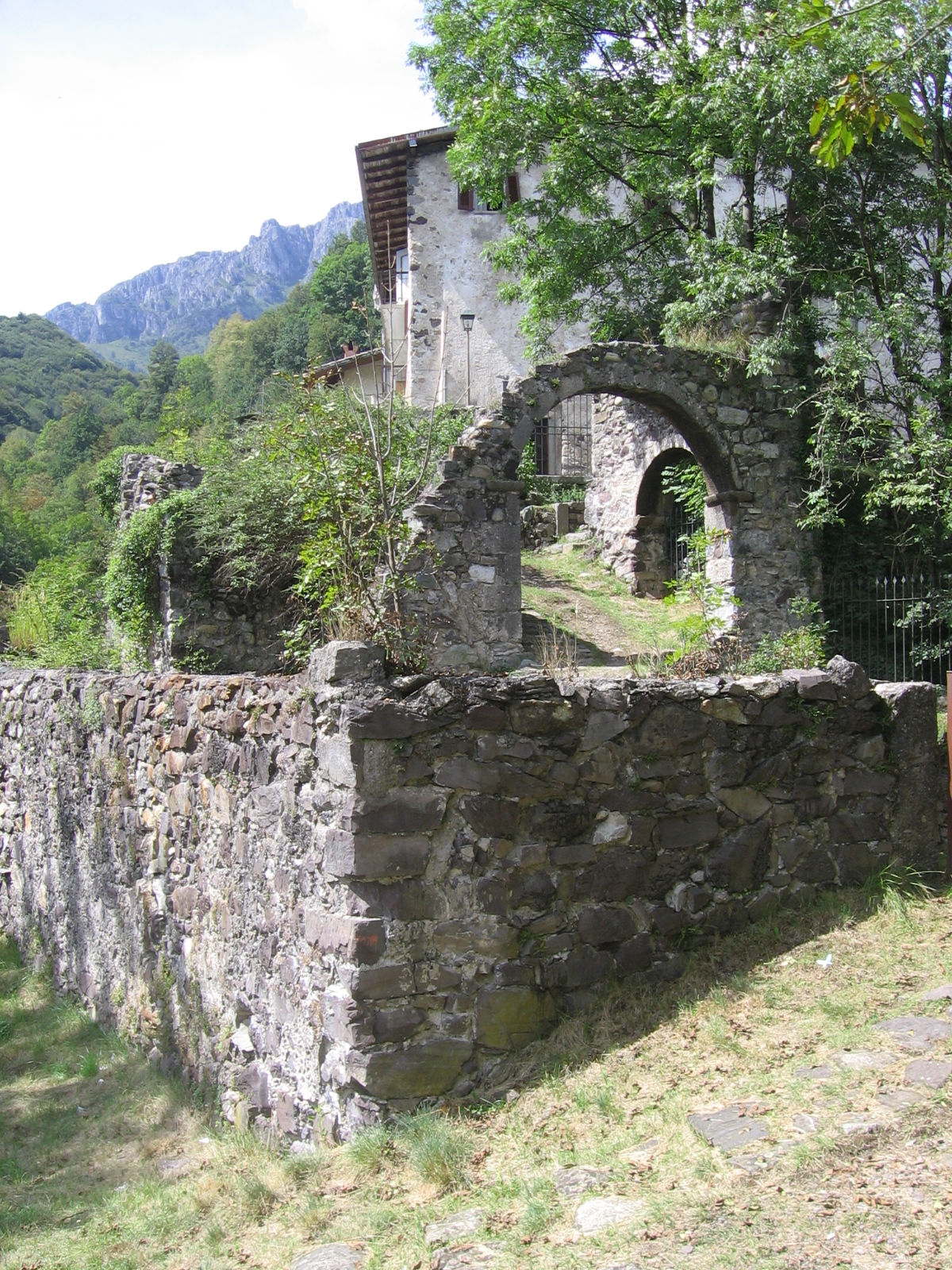
Cornello on the small Brembo River origin of the Thurn Taxis postal operations

== Postmaster General ==
Under his father, at the beginning of the War of the Spanish Succession the administration of the Imperial Reichspost was moved from Brussels to Frankfurt am Main. When his father died, Anselm Franz was appointed Postmaster General by Charles VI in 1715, and returned to the family's home in Brussels, but the city now had no significance for the Reichspost. He therefore moved back to Frankfurt am Main in 1724, where he bought a plot of land on which he later started construction of the Baroque Palais Thurn und Taxis in 1729. In 1725, he was able to lease the postal system of the Austrian Netherlands as a Habsburg fief. His move to Frankfurt was drawn out over several years, as the city council had some objections and in any case the construction of his palace took its time. From 1737 he lived in the still unfinished palace in Frankfurt, but then returned in 1739 to Brussels, where he died unexpectedly.

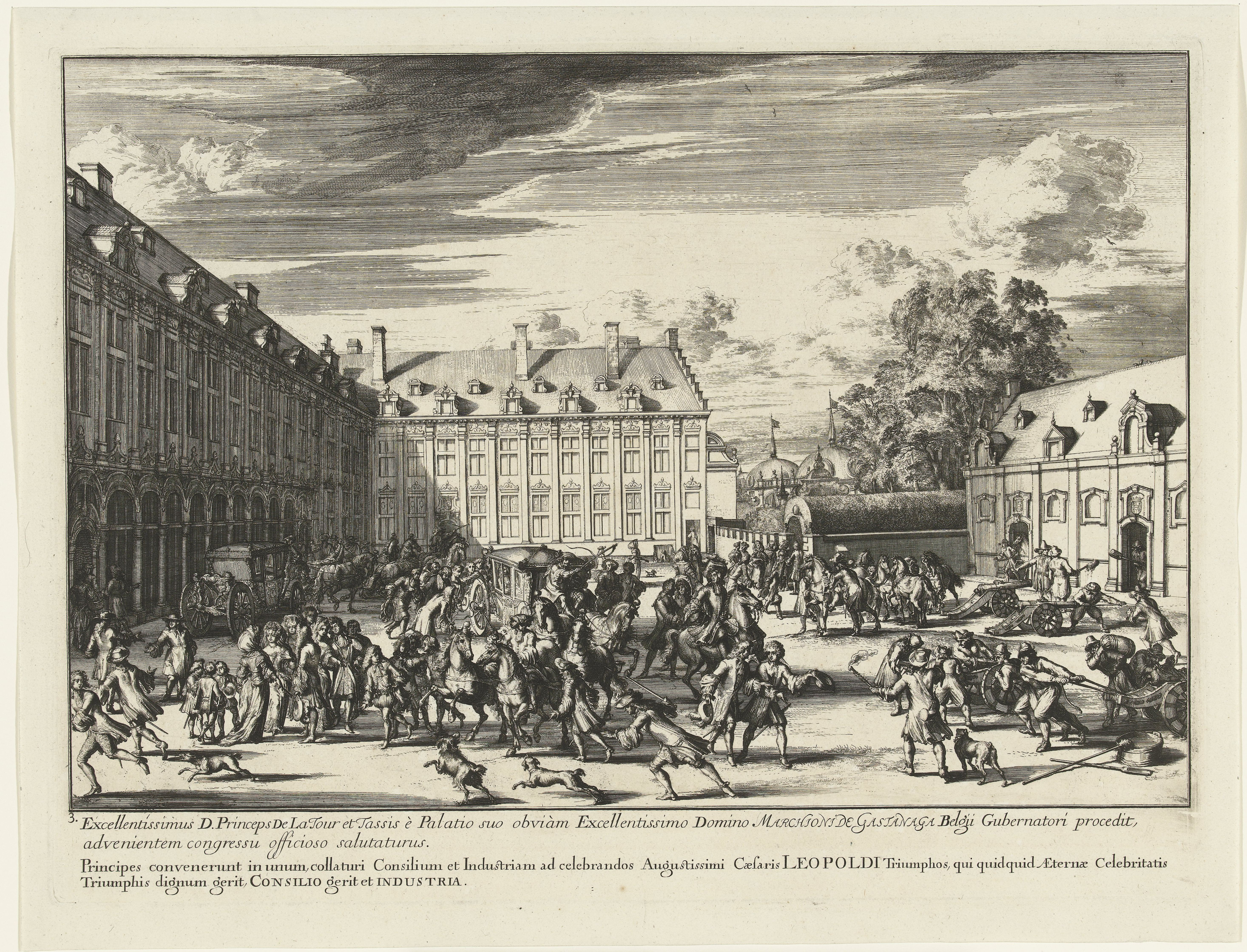
Drawing of the no longer existing Thurn & Taxis Postal Palace in Brussels

== Marriage and family ==
Anselm Franz married Czech noblewoman Princess Maria Ludovika Anna Franziska of Lobkowicz, daughter of Ferdinand August Leopold, Prince of Lobkowicz, Duke of Sagan and his wife Margravine Maria Anna Wilhelmine of Baden-Baden, on 10 January 1703. Franz Anselm and Maria Ludovika had four children:

- Alexander Ferdinand, 3rd Prince of Thurn and Taxis (1704–1773)
- Princess Philippine Eleonore Maria of Thurn and Taxis (1705–1706)
- Princess Maria Augusta of Thurn and Taxis (1706–1756)
- Prince Christian Adam Egon of Thurn and Taxis (1710–1745)

== Honours ==
- Knight of the Austrian Order of the Golden Fleece

== Sources ==
- Wolfgang Behringer (1990), Thurn und Taxis, Die Geschichte ihrer Post und ihrer Unternehmen (in German), München, Zürich: Piper, ISBN 3-492-03336-9
- Martin Dallmeier; Martha Schad (1996), Das Fürstliche Haus Thurn und Taxis, 300 Jahre Geschichte in Bildern (in German), Regensburg: Verlag Friedrich Pustet, ISBN 3-7917-1492-9
- Europäische Stammtafeln Band V

Anselm Franz, 2nd Prince of Thurn and Taxis House of Thurn and Taxis Cadet branch of the House of Tassis Born: 1681 Died: 8 November 1739
German nobility
Preceded by Eugen Alexander Franz	Prince of Thurn and Taxis; 21 February 1714 – 8 November 1739	Succeeded by Alexander Ferdinand
Postal offices
Preceded by Eugen Alexander Franz	Postmaster General of the Holy Roman Empire; 21 February 1714 – 8 November 1739	Succeeded by Alexander Ferdinand
