= Kaiserliche Reichspost =

Postal service of the Holy Roman Empire

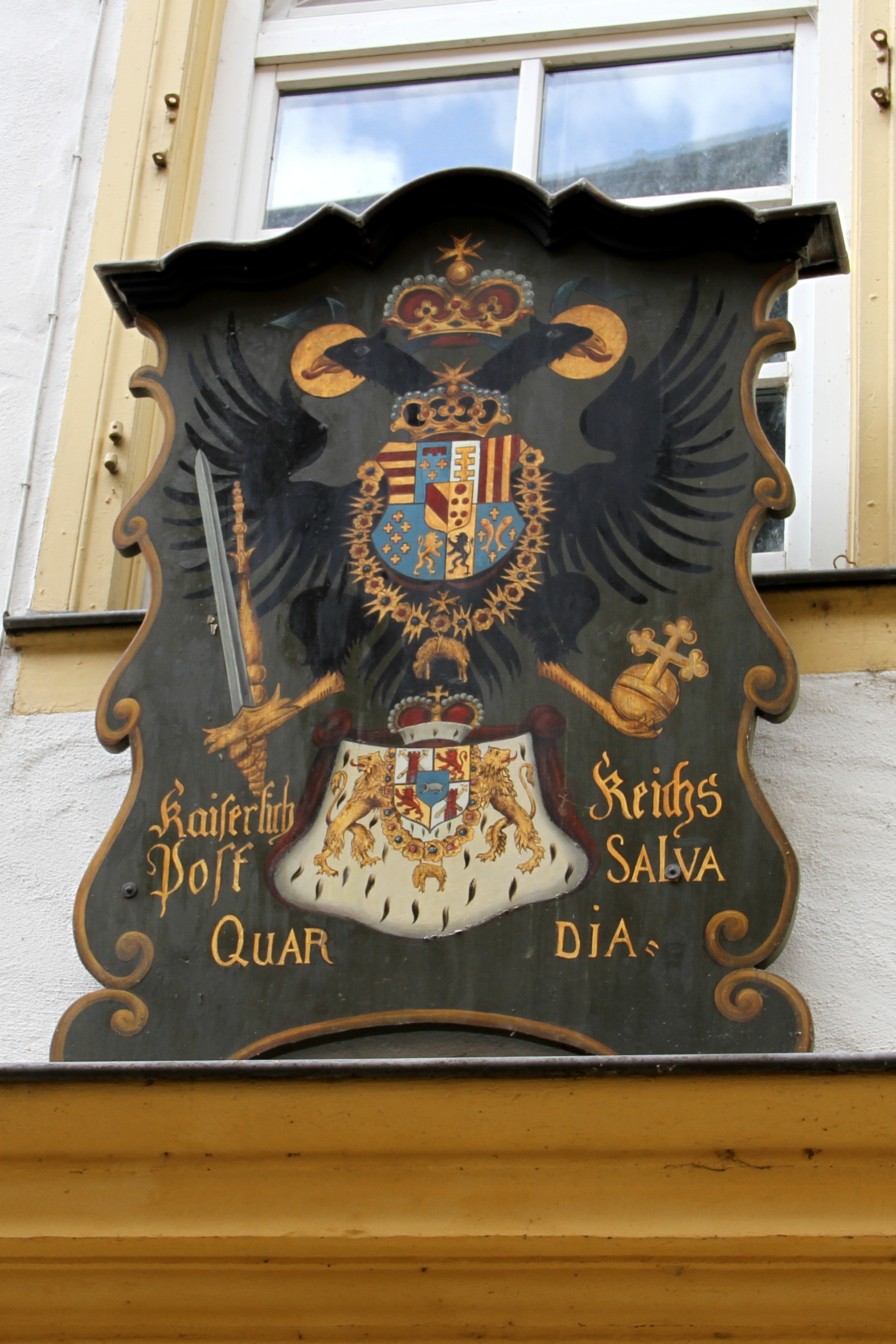
Kaiserlich Reichspost sign in Limburg

Kaiserliche Reichspost (German: [ˈʁaɪçsˌpɔst], Imperial Mail), originally named Niederländische Postkurs (Low Countries' postal route), was the name of the postal service of the Holy Roman Empire, founded in 1490. Often considered the world's first modern postal service, it initiated a revolution in communication in Europe.

== History ==
=== Background ===
In the late 15th and early 16th century, the Habsburg dynasty had managed to develop a transoceanic empire, on which it was said that "The sun never sets", but unlike the ancient Romans and Persians or their contemporary Chinese, Russians, Aztecs, or Incas, they lacked the financial capacity to maintain a postal system on their own. Other European governments tried to develop their own models as well, but efforts usually proved short-lived, as in the case Louis XI's ambitious project.

=== Development ===
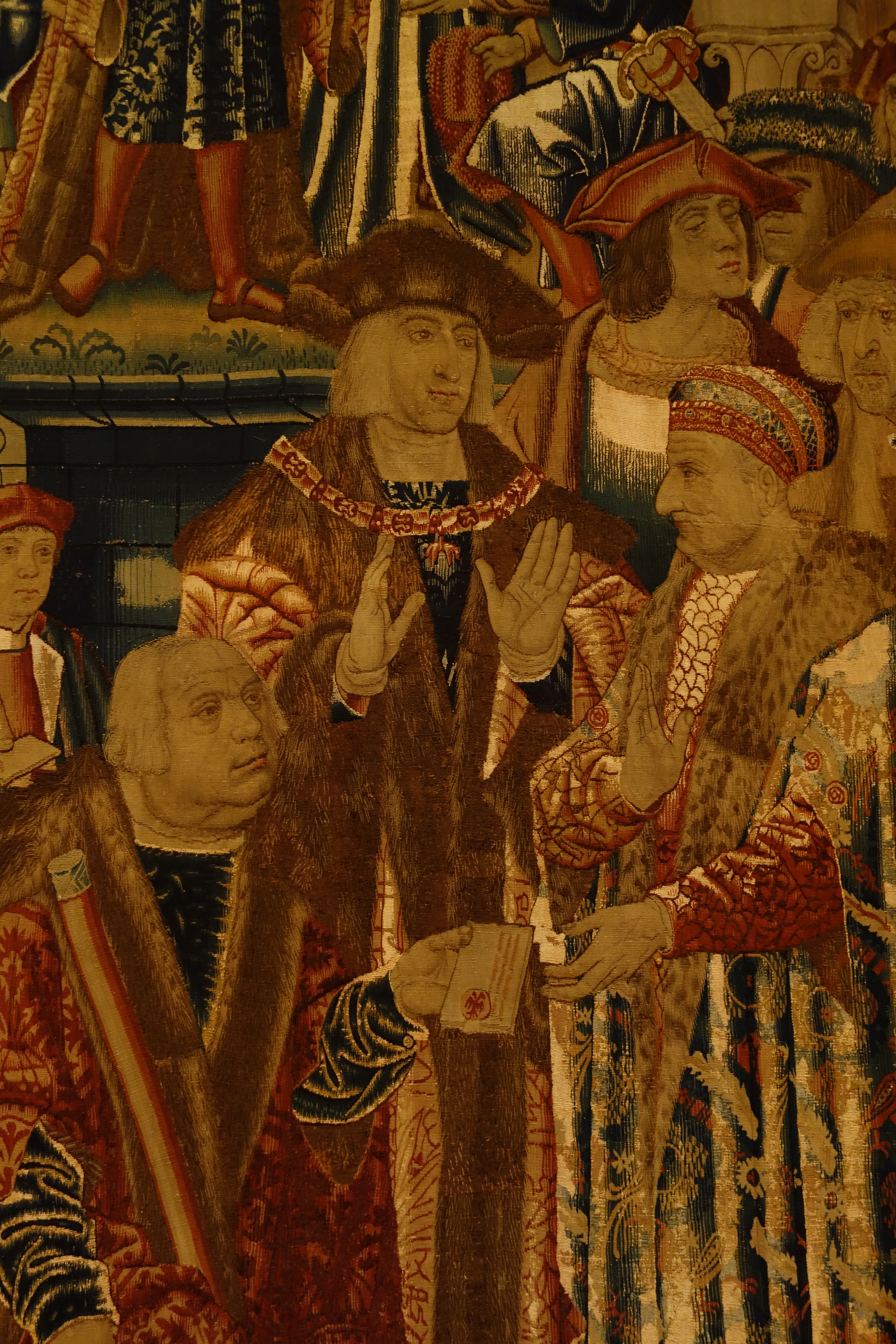
Franz von Taxis being bestowed with the postal rights by Frederick III according to Maximilian's arrangement.

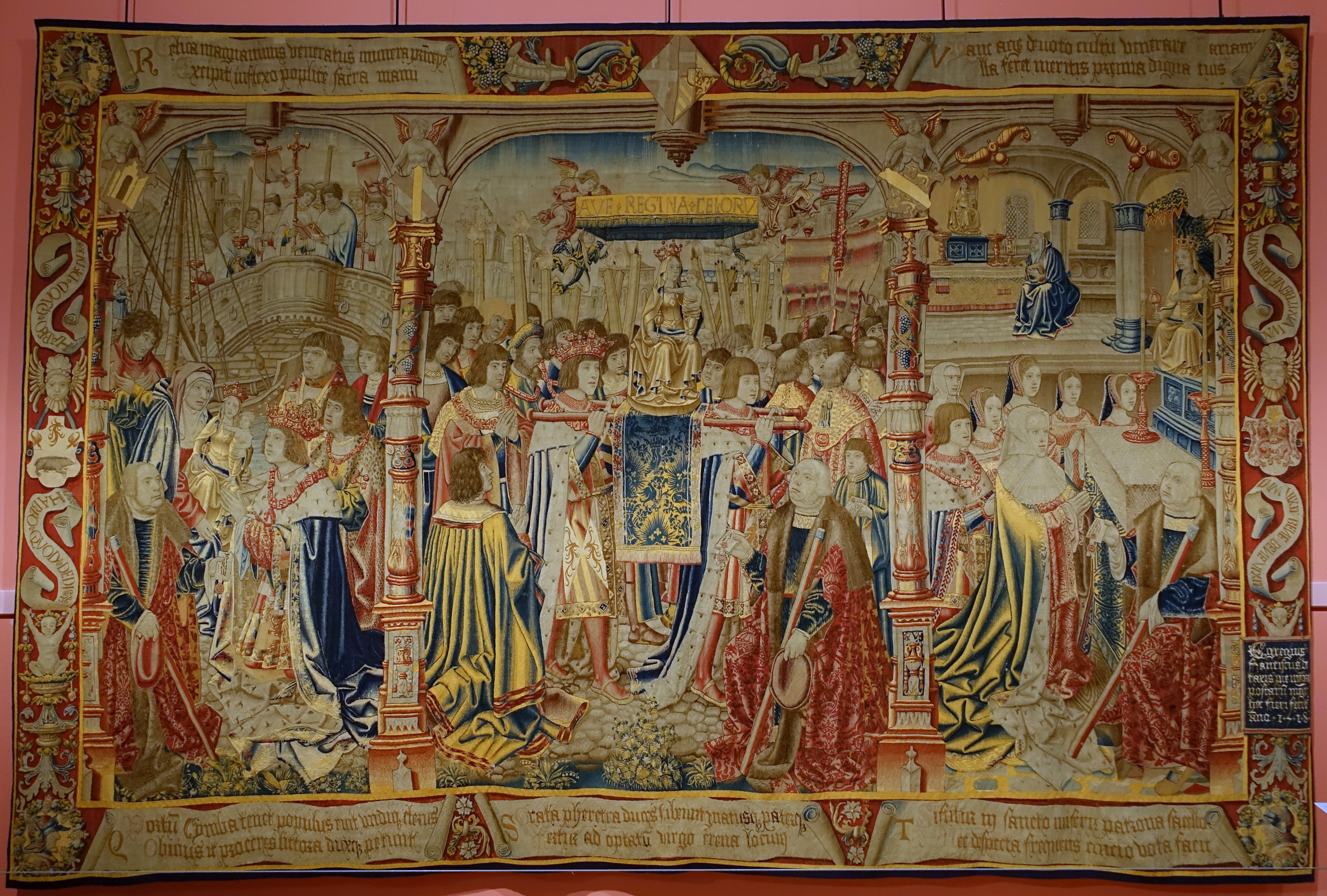
The kneeling figure wearing a crown on the left is Philip. Franz von Taxis appears as the kneeling figure(s) holding the signed letter. Charles V and his brother Ferdinand I, Holy Roman Emperor were carrying the palanquin.

Legend of Notre Dame du Sablon (or Our Lady of the Zavel) tapestries, commissioned by Franz von Taxis (1459–1517), circa 1518, with design attributed to Bernaert van Orley, featuring the important figures in the early development of the postal system.

It was founded by the brothers Janetto and Francesco Tasso (Franz von Taxis) together with Maximilian of Austria in 1495, on the basis of the pre-existing Italian models and the courier networks built by Frederick III and Charles the Bold. The Bergamascan Tasso family had built up postal routes throughout Italy since c. 1290 and Jannetto's uncle Ruggiero had worked for Frederick III since the mid-15th century.

After the marriage of Archduke Maximilian of Austria and Mary of Burgundy, to have a better line of communication to govern the Habsburgs' scattered territories, Maximilian commissioned the Taxis to organize the first postal line from Mechelen to Innsbruck. Maximilian's son Philip, as Duke of Burgundy and King of Castile, expanded the Habsburg postal system established by his father. In 1500, the centre of the system was transferred to Brussels by Franz von Taxis, whom Philip made his postmaster-general. At first, urged by his father, Philip tried to take over the system, but he realized that his bureaucrats were unable to run it efficiently. Thus he made an agreement (later renewed by Charles of Burgundy) with the Taxis that allowed them to operate unhampered by interference from the state, as long as they maintained standards in accordance with the Habsburgs' interests. On January 18, 1505, Philip unified communication between Germany, the Netherlands, France and Spain by adding stations in Granada, Toledo, Blois, Paris and Lyon. Charles of Burgundy, later Charles V, continued to develop the system after his father's death. Behringer notes that, "Whereas the status of private mail remains unclear in the treaty of 1506, it is obvious from the contract of 1516 that the Taxis company had the right to carry mail and keep the profit as long as it guaranteed the delivery of court mail at clearly defined speeds, regulated by time sheets to be filled in by the post riders on the way to their destination. In return, imperial privileges guaranteed exemption from local taxes, local jurisdiction, and military service. The terminology of the early modern communications system and the legal status of its participants were invented at these negotiations." He confirmed Jannetto's son Giovanni Battista as Postmaster General (chief et maistre general de noz postes par tous noz royaumes, pays, et seigneuries) in 1520. By Charles V's time, "the Holy Roman Empire had become the centre of the European communication(s) universe."

Augsburg benefitted majorly from the system. Even when the Habsburg empire began to extend to other parts of Europe, Maximilian's loyalty to Augsburg, where he conducted a lot of his endeavours, meant that the imperial city became "the dominant centre of early capitalism" of the sixteenth century, and "the location of the most important post office within the Holy Roman Empire".

The system quickly converged with the European trade system and an emerging market for news. According to Behringer, "During the reign of Emperor Maximilian, when private use of the imperial posts was still illegal, the terminuses of the first transcontinental post lines were already shifted from Innsbruck to Venice in the south, and from Brussels to Antwerp in the north. News arrived from all over the world in these towns, and this is where the communication and news businesses started to merge. And even more importantly, the Fuggers and other trading companies had their most important branches in these ports."

Confirmed by Emperor Rudolph II in 1595, the Imperial postal service remained a monopoly of the Thurn und Taxis family (officially hereditary from 1615 onwards) until it was terminated with the end of the Empire in 1806.

The Imperial Reichspost was first based in Mechelen, before being moved to Brussels in the Netherlands, from where the original ("Dutch") route led via Namur, Bastogne, Lieser, Wöllstein, Rheinhausen, and Augsburg to Innsbruck and Trento. It was also used to bypass the Kingdom of France in order to keep in touch with Habsburg Spain during times of hostility. Brussels was the side that organized and paid for the system.

Competing services were prohibited, although the Imperial cities and smaller principalities often developed their own communication system.

After the accession of Rudolph's brother Emperor Matthias in 1612, a second route was established from Cologne via Frankfurt, Aschaffenburg, and Nuremberg to Bohemia and later also to Leipzig and Hamburg. After the Thirty Years' War and the Peace of Westphalia, Postmaster General Count Lamoral II Claudius Franz von Thurn und Taxis and his successors had to deal with the establishment of separate postal agencies, mainly by the Protestant Imperial States of Northern German but also in several lands of the Habsburg monarchy, leading to long-lasting disputes over their range of authority. In the course of the War of the Spanish Succession, the Thurn und Taxis seat was relocated from Brussels to the Free City of Frankfurt in 1702.

Though the dynasty had sided with the Wittelsbach rival Charles VII in the War of the Austrian Succession, their services were indispensable, and Maria Theresa's husband Emperor Francis I officially re-implemented the Thurn und Taxis monopoly in 1746. Two years later, the postal authority moved to Regensburg, seat of the Imperial Diet. The family had accumulated extreme wealth; nonetheless, it was devastated by the Napoleonic Wars. The last Postmaster General, Prince Karl Alexander von Thurn und Taxis, lost his office with the Empire's dissolution on 6 August 1806, but his postal authority continued as the Frankfurt-based Thurn-und-Taxis Post until the unification of Germany.

== Structure ==
According to Barbara Stollberg-Rilinger, "The decisive innovative aspect of this system was the creation of postal stations where riders could change horses quickly, thus accelerating the speed with which they spread information. To consolidate the system further, Maximilian granted a monopoly over the post system to the noble family of Thurn and Taxis, which, in turn, made the system available to almost anyone by creating a system of fixed routes, timetables, and prices. The Imperial post system, together with the ever wider use of the printing press, brought about a veritable revolution in communication in the Empire and across Europe."

Gerhard Dohrn-van Rossum opines that the innovation lay with a combination of different elements – a setup in which nearly all known organizational means of conveying information were combined to give rise to the early modern postal system: post stations at regular intervals, changes of horses and couriers, fixed delivery times, acceleration through continuous transport, and—implicitly—the organizational framework of the state. This setup, created in 1490, is described in the chronicles of the city of Memmingen report:

In this year they began to establish the posts at the order of Maximilian I the Roman king, from Austria all the way to the Netherlands, France, and Rome. Everywhere one post was separated from another by five miles [38 kilometers] [...]

Other authors note that the notable feature of the system was that it was the first public-access postal system (mainly due to the financing problems): the mingling of private and government mails broke a threshold. It became open to private mail since the early sixteenth century, with fees being fixed.

== Influence and legacy ==
This was the first modern postal service in the world and initiated a revolution in communication in Europe.

Maximilian had intended that the system would serve the Habsburgs alone. But the initiative was emulated immediately (in a matter of months) by France and England, although initially they wanted to restrict the development of private mail. "The French postal network was soon denser than the imperial one, while Henry VII (r. 1485-1509) and subsequent Tudor monarchs remained content with a line of communication from Dover to London and from London to Berwick on the Scottish border." The Habsburg system gained in importance when Philip expanded it to Spain though. It became so successful that it would function until the end of the Holy Roman Empire. The system quickly became a Europe-wide, fee-based, regular and reliable service. The English system, established by Henry VIII in 1512, also had to begin to carry private mails partly to raise revenue and partly to allow the government to keep an eye on public communication. It became open to public use in 1635. Dewald comments, "Unlike in ancient Rome or China, no European ruler was able or willing to finance his or her own postal system." Under Gustavus Adolphus, the Swedish, who until this time had no such system of their own, emulated the Reichspost model too. This was why they called their communication services the Rijkspost.

The system's development facilitated the Habsburgs's control over their scattered territories, especially the financial centers in South Germany, North Italy, the Low Countries and Spain.

The Deutsche Post considers itself the continuation of the system. In 1990, they celebrated the 500th year of the Reichspost's establishment.

== See also ==
- Postage stamps and postal history of Germany
- Deutsche Post
- Deutsche Bundespost
- Cursus publicus
