= Fürstenberg-Stühlingen =

Coordinates: 47°44′44″N 8°26′46″E

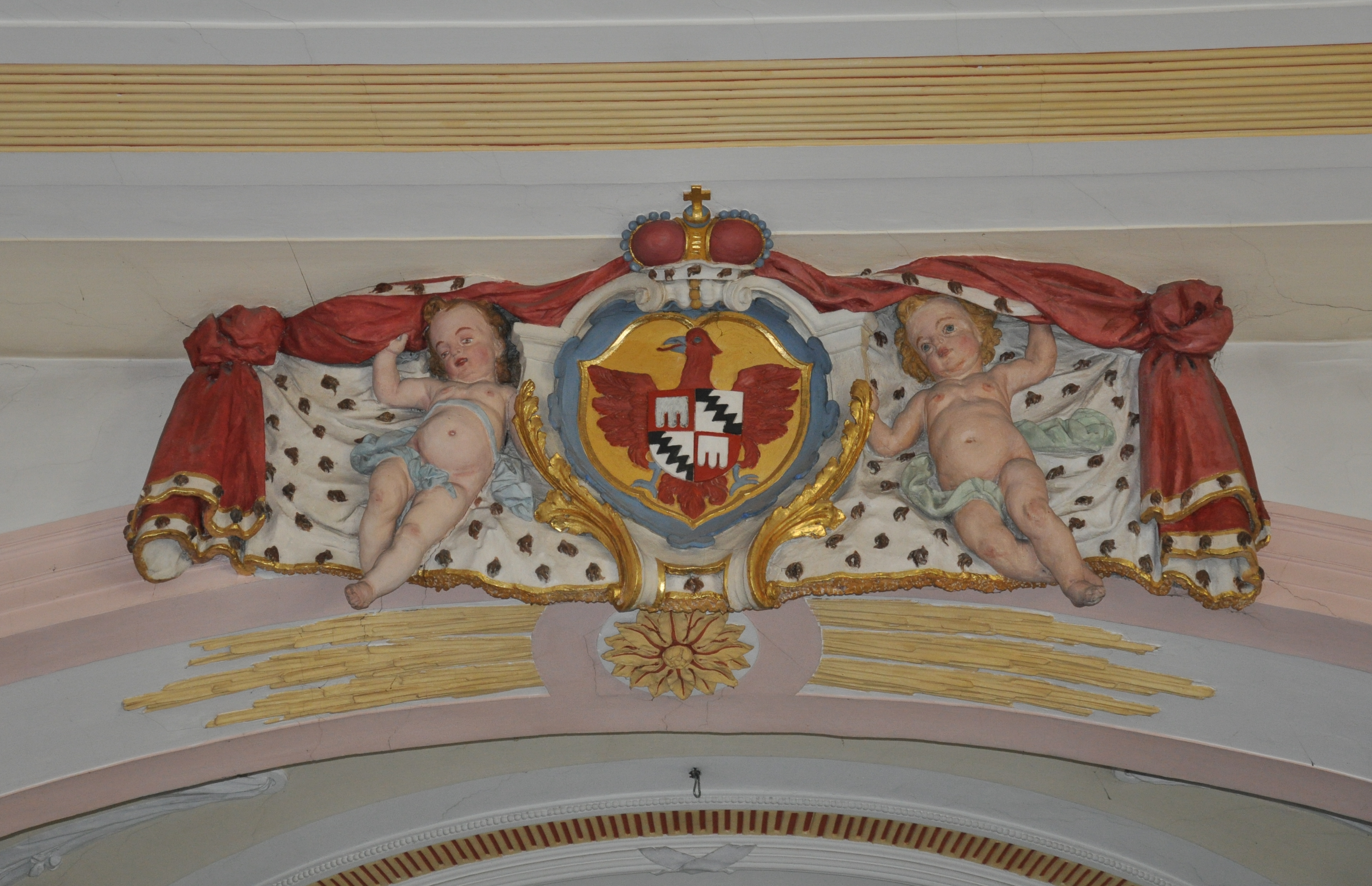
Fürstenberg-Stühlingen Coat of arms

Fürstenberg-Stühlingen was a German county during the Middle Ages. It was located in the territorial landgraviate of Stühlingen. It emerged as a partition of Fürstenberg-Blumberg in 1614. It was partitioned in 1704 between the sons of Count Prosper Ferdinand, with Fürstenberg-Fürstenberg going to Joseph William Ernest and Fürstenberg-Weitra going to his posthumous son, Louis Augustus Egon.

== Counts of Fürstenberg-Stühlingen ==
- Frederick Rudolf of Fürstenburg (1614–1655)
- Maximilian Francis (1655–1681)
- Anton Mary Frederick (1681–1689) with Prosper Ferdinand (1681–1704)
